= Vanamõisa =

Vanamõisa may refer to several places in Estonia:

- Vanamõisa, Kose Parish, village in Kose Parish, Harju County
- Vanamõisa, Saue Parish, village in Saue Parish, Harju County
- Vanamõisa, Hiiu County, village in Hiiumaa Parish, Hiiu County
- Vanamõisa, Jõgeva County, village in Jõgeva Parish, Jõgeva County
- Vanamõisa, Lääne-Viru County, village in Haljala Parish, Lääne-Viru County
- Vanamõisa, Pärnu County, village in Lääneranna Parish, Pärnu County
- Vanamõisa, Põlva County, village in Põlva Parish, Põlva County
- Vanamõisa, Muhu Parish, village in Muhu Parish, Saare County
- Vanamõisa, Saaremaa Parish, village in Saaremaa Parish, Saare County
- Vanamõisa, Valga County, village in Tõrva Parish, Valga County
- Vanamõisa, Viljandi County, village in Viljandi Parish, Viljandi County
- Vanamõisa, Võru County, village in Rõuge Parish, Võru County
- Valgu-Vanamõisa (known as Vanamõisa before 2017), village in Märjamaa Parish, Rapla County
- Vigala-Vanamõisa (known as Vanamõisa before 2017), village in Märjamaa Parish, Rapla County
