= Tõrasoo Nature Reserve =

Protected area in Estonia

- Interactive map of Tõrasoo Nature Reserve
- Location: Estonia
- Coordinates: 58°50′45″N 24°42′39″E
- Area: 3,306 ha (8,170 acres)
- Established: 2005

Tõrasoo Nature Reserve is a nature reserve which is located in Rapla County, Estonia.

The area of the nature reserve is 3306 ha.

The protected area was founded in 2005 to protect valuable habitat types and threatened species in Tõrasoo Bog and its surrounding areas in former Raikküla and Märjamaa Parish.
