= Männiku =

Männiku may refer to several places in Estonia:

- Männiku, Tallinn, a neighborhood of Tallinn
- Männiku, Haapsalu, a neighborhood of Haapsalu
- Männiku, Saku Parish, a village in Saku Parish, Harju County
- Männiku, Lääne County, a village in Martna Parish, Lääne County
- Männiku, Rapla County, a village in Märjamaa Parish, Rapla County
- Männiku, Saare County, a village in Saaremaa Parish, Saare County

== See also ==
- Männik, Estonian surname
