= Alaküla =

Alaküla may refer to:

== Places ==
- Alaküla, Pärnu County, village in Lääneranna Parish, Pärnu County, Estonia
- Alaküla, Rapla County, village in Märjamaa Parish, Rapla County, Estonia
- Alaküla, Tartu County, village in Kastre Parish, Tartu County, Estonia

== People with the surname ==
- Allan Alaküla (born 1968), Estonian journalist
- Ellen Alaküla (1927– 2011), Estonian actress

== See also ==
- Alakülä, village in Võru Parish, Võru County, Estonia
- Altküla (disambiguation)
