= Mõisamaa =

Mõisamaa may refer to several places in Estonia:

- Mõisamaa, Ida-Viru County, village in Toila Parish, Ida-Viru County
- Mõisamaa, Jõgeva County, village in Jõgeva Parish, Jõgeva County
- Mõisamaa, Lääne-Viru County, village in Väike-Maarja Parish, Lääne-Viru County
- Mõisamaa, Rapla County, village in Märjamaa Parish, Rapla County

== See also ==
- Mõisimaa, village in Lääneranna Parish, Pärnu County
