= Metsaääre =

Metsaääre may refer to several places in Estonia:

- Metsaääre, Pärnu County, village in Surju Parish, Pärnu County
- Metsaääre, Kehtna Parish, village in Kehtna Parish, Rapla County
- Metsaääre, Märjamaa Parish, village in Märjamaa Parish, Rapla County
- Metsaääre, Saare County, village in Leisi Parish, Saare County
