= Lokuta =

Lokuta may refer to several places in Estonia:

- Lokuta, Järva County, village in Türi Parish, Järva County
- Lokuta, Lääne-Viru County, village in Tapa Parish, Lääne-Viru County
- Lokuta, Kehtna Parish, village in Kehtna Parish, Rapla County
- Lokuta, Märjamaa Parish, village in Märjamaa Parish, Rapla County

== See also ==
- Lokuti, village in Saku Parish, Harju County
