= Käbiküla =

Käbiküla may refer to several places in Estonia:

- Käbiküla, Kehtna Parish, a village in Kehtna Parish, Rapla County
- Käbiküla, Märjamaa Parish, a village in Märjamaa Parish, Rapla County
