= Metsküla =

Metsküla may refer to several places in Estonia:

- Metsküla, Ida-Viru County, village in Alutaguse Parish, Ida-Viru County
- Metsküla, Pärnu County, village in Lääneranna Parish, Pärnu County
- Metsküla, Märjamaa Parish, village in Märjamaa Parish, Rapla County
- Metsküla, Rapla Parish, village in Rapla Parish, Rapla County
- Metsküla, Saare County, village in Saaremaa Parish, Saare County
- Metsküla, Viljandi County, village in Põhja-Sakala Parish, Viljandi County

== See also ==
- Metsaküla (disambiguation)
