= Keskküla =

Keskküla may refer to:

== Places in Estonia ==
- Keskküla, Lääne County, village in Lääne-Nigula Parish, Lääne County
- Keskküla, Rapla County, village in Märjamaa Parish, Rapla County

== People ==
- Ando Keskküla (1950–2008), Estonian artist

== See also ==
- Kesküla
