= Jõeääre =

Jõeääre may refer to several places in Estonia:

- Jõeääre, Pärnu County, village in Lääneranna Parish, Pärnu County
- Jõeääre, Rapla County, village in Märjamaa Parish, Rapla County

== See also ==
- Jõeäär, an Estonian surname
