= Altküla =

Altküla may refer to several places in Estonia:

- Altküla, Harju County, village in Lääne-Harju Parish, Harju County
- Altküla, Ida-Viru County, village in Toila Parish, Ida-Viru County
- Altküla, Pärnu County, village in Põhja-Pärnumaa Parish, Pärnu County
- Altküla, Rapla County, village in Märjamaa Parish, Rapla County

== See also ==
- Alaküla (disambiguation)
