= Pajaka Landscape Conservation Area =

Protected area in Estonia

- Location within Estonia
- Location: Estonia
- Coordinates: 59°03′30″N 24°24′00″E
- Area: 202 ha (500 acres)
- Established: 1958 (2006)

Pajaka

Pajaka Landscape Conservation Area is a nature park which is located in Rapla County, Estonia.

The area of the nature park is 202 ha.

The protected area was founded in 1958 to protect oak-spruce mixed forest at Hiie Farmstead (Märjamaa Parish). In 2006, the protected area was designated to the landscape conservation area.
