= Naari =

Naari may refer to:

- Naari (film), 1953 film
- Naari: The Women, 2025 film
- Nääri, a village in western Estonia
