= Sõtke =

Sõtke may refer to several places in Estonia:

- Sõtke, Narva-Jõesuu, village in Narva-Jõesuu, Ida-Viru County
- Sõtke, Rapla County, village in Märjamaa Parish, Rapla County
- Sõtke (river), river in Ida-Viru County
