= Aksel Kuuse =

Estonian high jumper

Personal information
- Nationality: Estonian
- Born: 18 September 1913 Sipa manor Estonia (now, Märjamaa Parish, Rapla County)
- Died: 27 April 1942 (aged 28)

Sport
- Sport: Athletics
- Event: High jump

Aksel Kuuse (18 September 1913 – 27 April 1942) was an Estonian athlete. He competed in the men's high jump at the 1936 Summer Olympics. He died in prison of war camp in the Soviet Union during World War II.
