= Saare Dolomiit-Väokivi =

Company based in Estonia

OÜ Saare Dolomiit-Väokivi
- Founded: 1967
- Headquarters: Tallinn, Estonia

OÜ Saare Dolomiit-Väokivi is an Estonian private limited company established in 1997. The company is active in the mining and processing of natural stone. Its headquarters are located in Tallinn and its factory is located on the island of Saaremaa.

Since 2007 the company uses trademark Reval Stone to market its products.

== History ==
The company's history can be dated back to as far as 1967 when the Saaremaa unit of factory "Eesti Dolomiit" ("Estonian Dolomite") was established. This makes the company one of the oldest miners and processors of limestone and dolomite in Estonia. In 1989 was established an Estonian-Canadian joint venture called "Saare Dolomiit - McIntosh Granite Corporation" which went bankrupt in 1994. This joint venture was the direct predecessor of the private limited company "Saare Dolomiit" established in 1997. From 2003 this company is called "OÜ Saare Dolomiit-Väokivi".

In 2015 the company's revenue was 1.86 million euros.

== Quarries ==
The quarries of "OÜ Saare Dolomiit-Väokivi" are located on Saaremaa island (Kaarma dolomite and Selgase dolomite), in Tallinn (Lasnamäe limestone) and near Märjamaa (Orgita dolomite).
