= Kilgi =

Kilgi may refer to several places in Estonia:

- Kilgi, Pärnu County, village in Lääneranna Parish, Pärnu County
- Kilgi, Rapla County, village in Märjamaa Parish, Rapla County
