= Lümandu =

Lümandu may refer to several places in Estonia:

- Lümandu, Kohila Parish, village in Kohila Parish, Rapla County
- Lümandu, Märjamaa Parish, village in Märjamaa Parish, Rapla County
