= Kasti, Rapla County =

Village in Estonia

Coordinates: 58°52′16″N 24°31′59″E

Kasti
- Village
- Interactive map of Kasti
- Country: Estonia
- County: Rapla County
- Parish: Märjamaa Parish
- Time zone: UTC+2 (EET)
  - Summer (DST): UTC+3 (EEST)

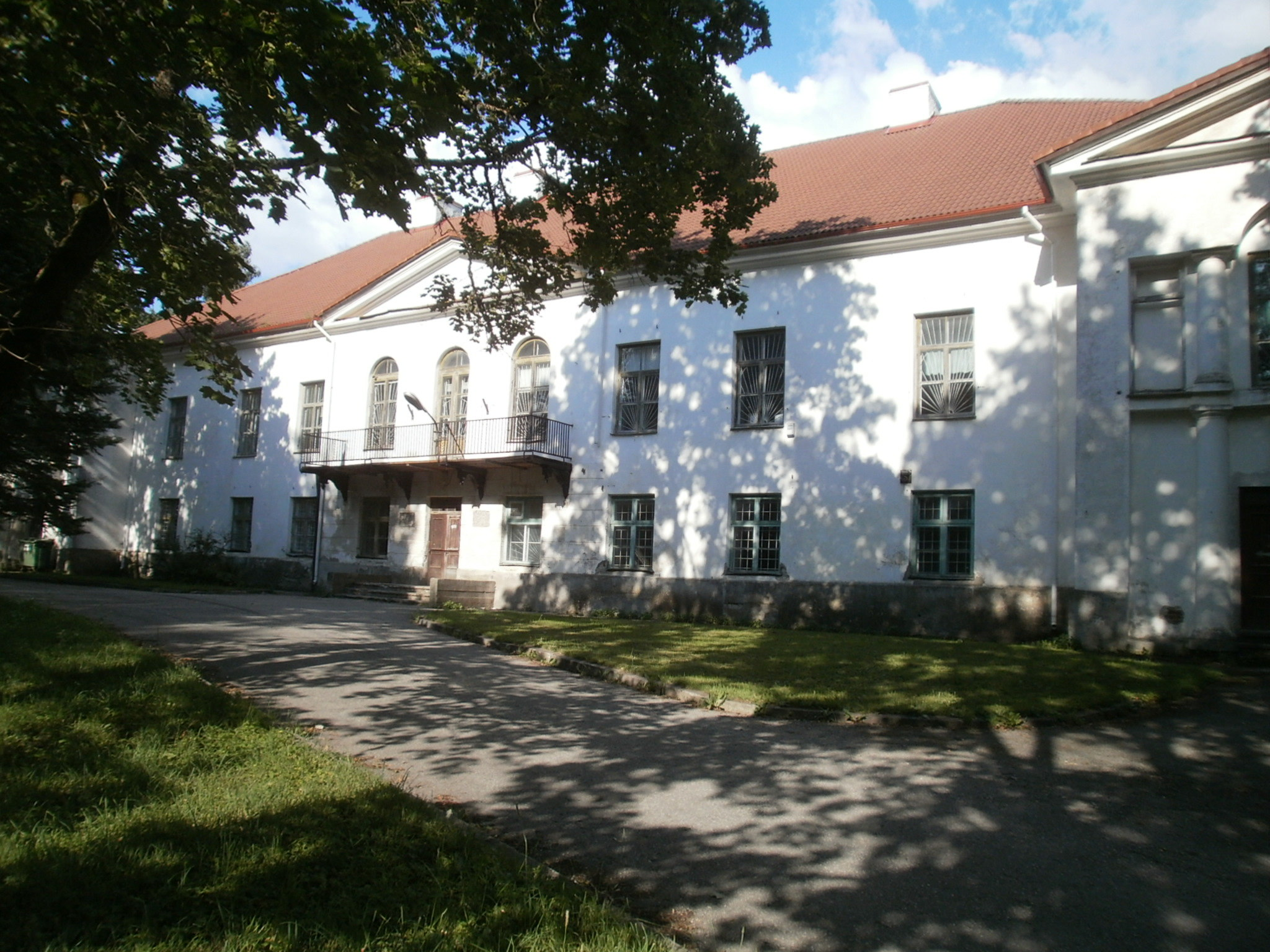
Kasti Manor.

Kasti is a village in Märjamaa Parish, Rapla County in western Estonia.
