= Ants Lauter =

Estonian actor, theatre director, and pedagogue

Ants Lauter (5 July [O.S. 23 June] 1894 – 30 October 1973) was an Estonian actor, theatre director and pedagogue, People's Artist of the USSR (1948). He was born in the parish of Velise within Veski, Wiek County, and died, aged 79, in Tallinn.

Since 1974 the Ants Lauter Award has been given to a young stage actor or theatre director.

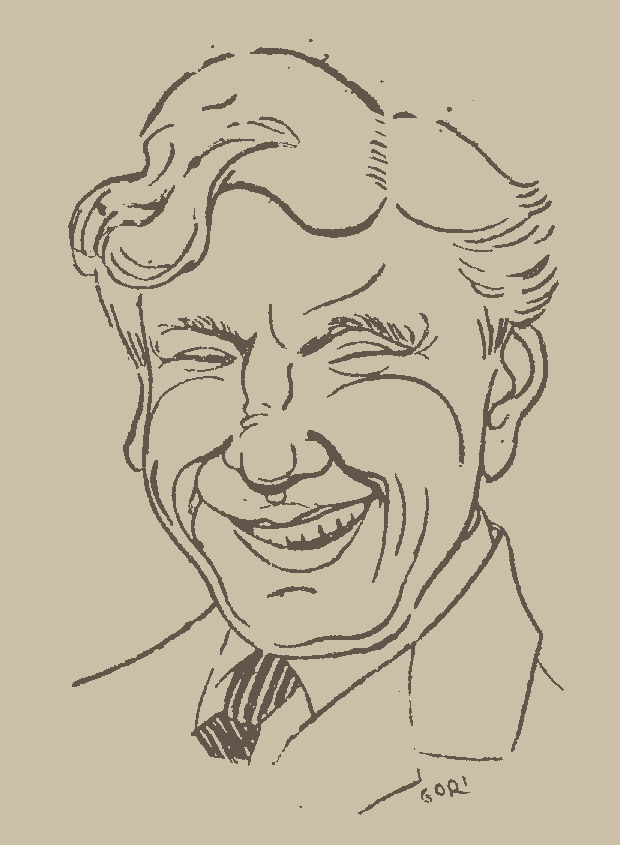
Pencil drawing of Ants Lauter by Gori, c. 1920

== Filmography ==
- 1924: Mineviku varjud as Kaljo, Olev's son
- 1936: VMV 6 as the captain of a smuggling vessel
- 1947: Life in the Citadel, episode
- 1951: Valgus Koordis
- 1955: Andruse õnn as Aruland
- 1956: The Rumyantsev Case
- 1958: Esimese järgu kapten
- 1959: Kutsumata külalised as Colonel Kikas
- 1964: Hamlet as the priest
- 1965: Mäeküla piimamees as Baron von Kremer
- 1968: Dead Season
- 1968: Far in the West as the grandfather
- 1968: Mehed ei nuta as the managing director
- 1969: Must nagu mina
- 1969: Posol Sovetskogo Soyuza
- 1969: Viimne reliikvia / The Last Relic as the old man
- 1970: King Lear, episode
- 1970: Kolme katku vahel as Mr. Henrik Claesson Horn
- 1970: Tuuline rand, episode
- 1970: Valge laev, episode
