= Suurküla, Rapla County =

Village in Estonia

Coordinates: 58°53′49″N 24°31′28″E

Suurküla
- Village
- Interactive map of Suurküla
- Country: Estonia
- County: Rapla County
- Parish: Märjamaa Parish
- Time zone: UTC+2 (EET)
  - Summer (DST): UTC+3 (EEST)

Suurküla is a village in Märjamaa Parish, Rapla County, in western Estonia.
