= Sulu, Rapla County =

Village in Estonia

Coordinates: 58°49′36″N 24°29′38″E

Sulu
- Village
- Interactive map of Sulu
- Country: Estonia
- County: Rapla County
- Parish: Märjamaa Parish
- Time zone: UTC+2 (EET)
  - Summer (DST): UTC+3 (EEST)

Sulu is a village in Märjamaa Parish, Rapla County in western Estonia.
