= Eberhard Vogdt =

Estonian sailor

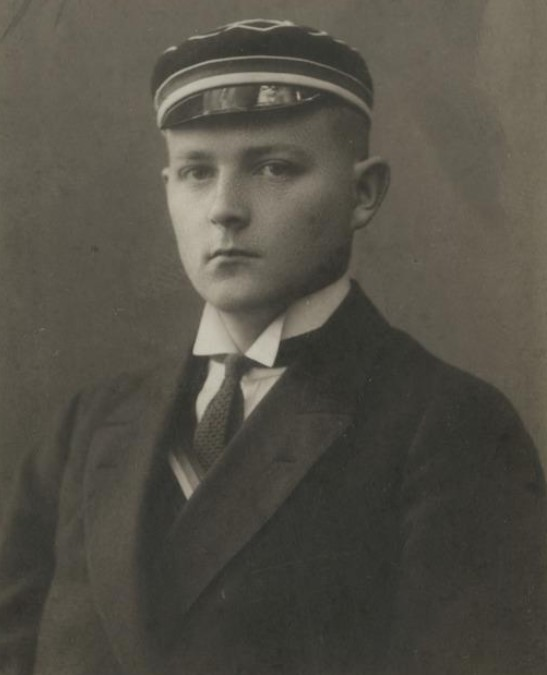
- 1920

Personal information
- Full name: Eberhard Konrad Roman Vogdt
- Born: 27 July [O.S. 14 July] 1902 Kohatu, Governorate of Estonia
- Died: 9 February 1964 (aged 61) Oberaula, West Germany

Sailing career
- Sport: Sailing
Medal record
Sailing
Representing Estonia
Olympic Games
Bronze medal – third place	1928 Amsterdam	6 metre class

Eberhard Konrad Roman Vogdt (27 July [O.S. 14 July] 1902 in Kohatu, Governorate of Estonia – 9 February 1964 in Oberaula, West Germany) was an Estonian sailor who competed in the 1928 Summer Olympics.

In 1928 he was a crew member of the Estonian boat Tutti V which won the bronze medal in the 6 metre class.
