= Luiste =

Village in Estonia

Coordinates: 58°50′52″N 24°12′51″E

- Village
- Interactive map of Luiste
- Country: Estonia
- County: Rapla County
- Parish: Märjamaa Parish
- Time zone: UTC+2 (EET)
  - Summer (DST): UTC+3 (EEST)

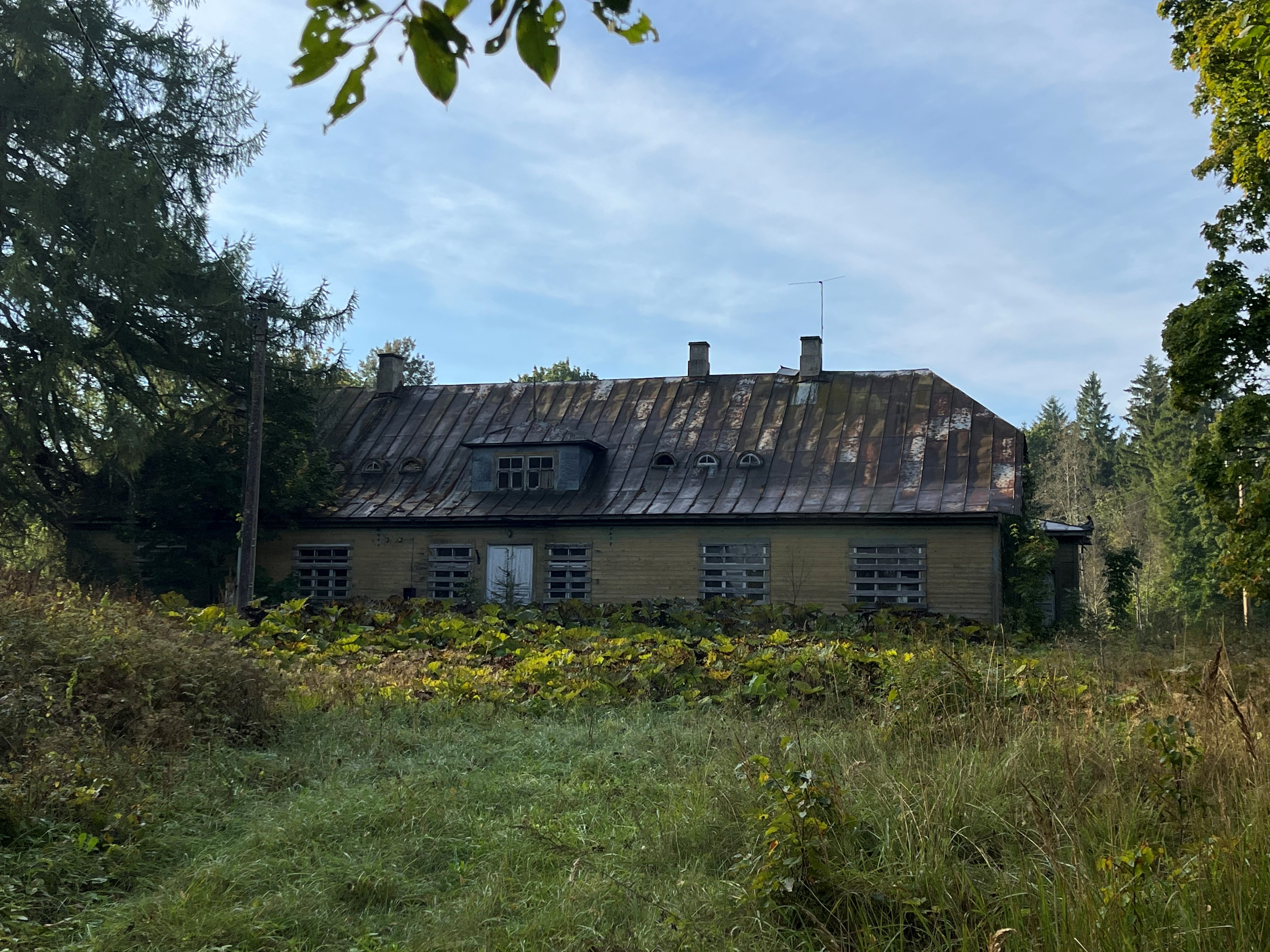
Luiste manor house in September 2024

Luiste (German: Luist) is a village in Märjamaa Parish, Rapla County in western Estonia.
