= Lestima =

Village in Estonia

- Village
- Location in Estonia
- Coordinates: 59°03′15″N 024°28′34″E
- Country: Estonia
- County: Rapla County
- Parish: Märjamaa Parish
- Time zone: UTC+2 (EET)
  - Summer (DST): UTC+3 (EEST)

Lestima is a village in Märjamaa Parish, Rapla County in western Estonia, on the right (east) bank of the Teenuse River.
