= Kaguvere =

Village in Estonia

- Village
- Location in Estonia
- Coordinates: 58°49′59″N 024°19′12″E
- Country: Estonia
- County: Rapla County
- Parish: Märjamaa Parish
- Time zone: UTC+2 (EET)
  - Summer (DST): UTC+3 (EEST)

Kaguvere is a village in Märjamaa Parish, Rapla County in western Estonia, north of the Teenuse River.
