= Purku =

Village in Estonia

Coordinates: 58°53′N 24°47′E

- Village
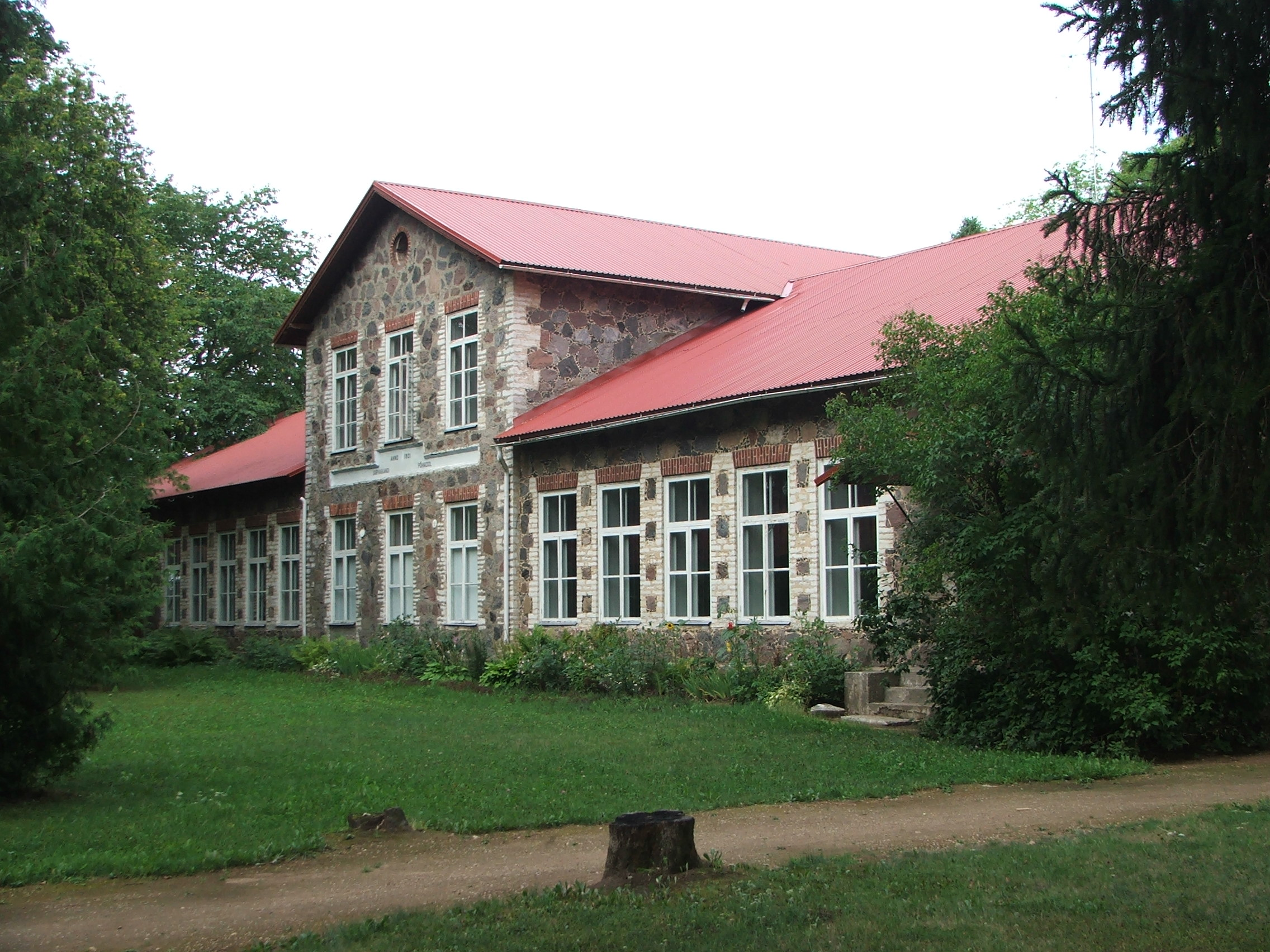
- Purku primary school
- Interactive map of Purku
- Country: Estonia
- County: Rapla County
- Parish: Rapla Parish
- Time zone: UTC+2 (EET)
  - Summer (DST): UTC+3 (EEST)

Purku is a village in Rapla Parish, Rapla County in northwestern Estonia. Between 1991 and 2017 (until the administrative reform of Estonian municipalities) the village was located in Raikküla Parish.

Purku population is estimated at 177 in 2021.
