= Nurtu-Nõlva =

Village in Estonia

Coordinates: 58°46′N 24°36′E

- Village
- Interactive map of Nurtu-Nõlva
- Country: Estonia
- County: Rapla County
- Parish: Märjamaa Parish
- Time zone: UTC+2 (EET)
  - Summer (DST): UTC+3 (EEST)

Nurtu-Nõlva is a village in Märjamaa Parish, Rapla County in western Estonia. As of the 2011 census, the population was 22.
