= Vigala-Vanamõisa =

Village in Estonia

Coordinates: 58°43′52″N 24°18′09″E

- Village
- Interactive map of Vigala-Vanamõisa
- Country: Estonia
- County: Rapla County
- Parish: Märjamaa Parish
- Time zone: UTC+2 (EET)
  - Summer (DST): UTC+3 (EEST)

Vigala-Vanamõisa (Vanamõisa until 2017) is a village in Märjamaa Parish, Rapla County in western Estonia.
