= Paisumaa =

Village in Estonia

Coordinates: 58°49′N 24°40′E

- Village
- Interactive map of Paisumaa
- Country: Estonia
- County: Rapla County
- Parish: Märjamaa Parish

Population (2005)
  - Total: 8
- Time zone: UTC+2 (EET)
  - Summer (DST): UTC+3 (EEST)

Paisumaa is a village in Märjamaa Parish, Rapla County in western Estonia.
