= Leevre =

Village in Estonia

Coordinates: 58°59′N 24°12′E

- Village
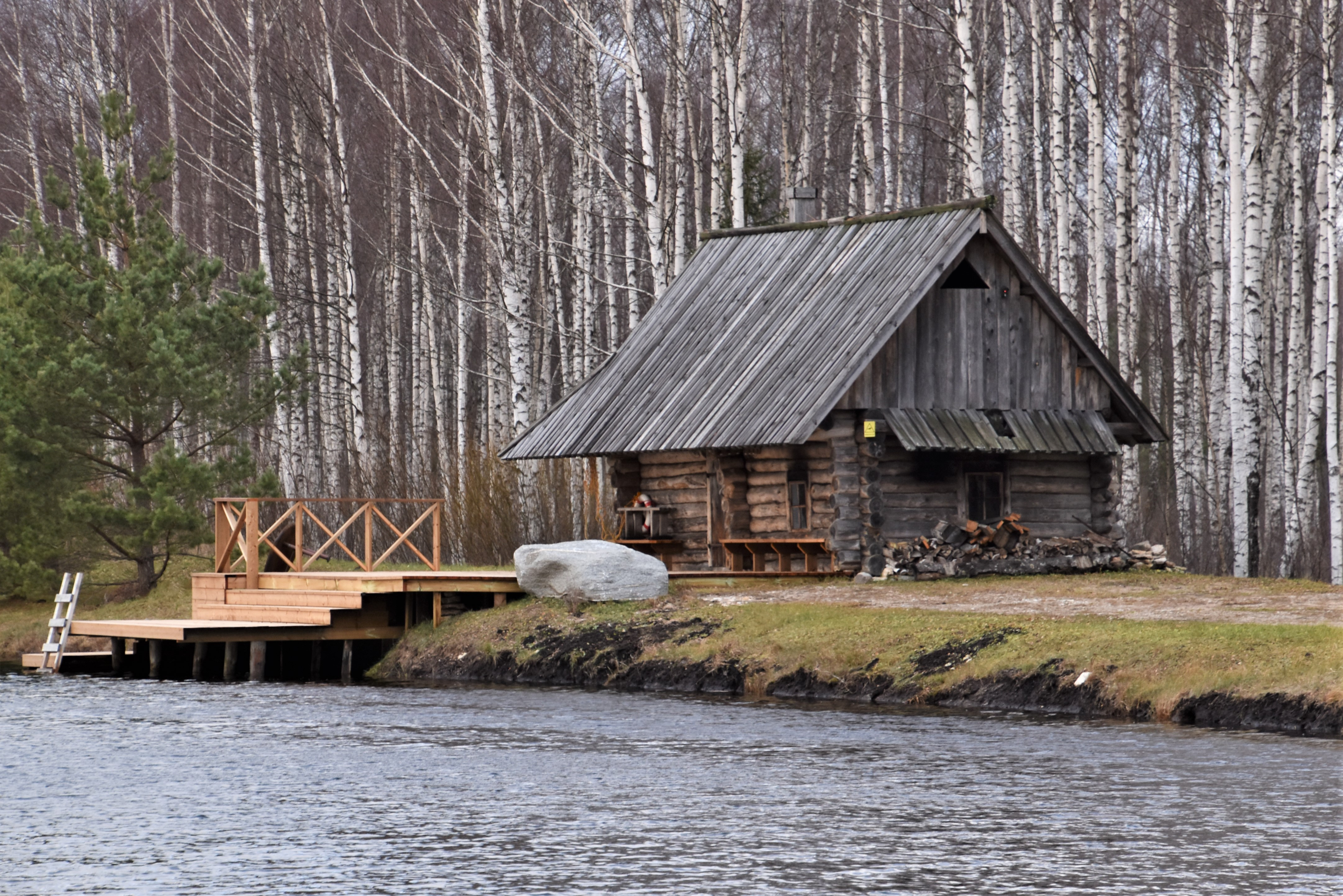
- Smoke sauna in Leevre village
- Interactive map of Leevre
- Country: Estonia
- County: Rapla County
- Parish: Märjamaa Parish
- Time zone: UTC+2 (EET)
  - Summer (DST): UTC+3 (EEST)

Leevre (German: Lewer) is a village in Märjamaa Parish, Rapla County in western Estonia.
