= Pühatu =

Village in Estonia

Coordinates: 58°56′N 24°32′E

- Village
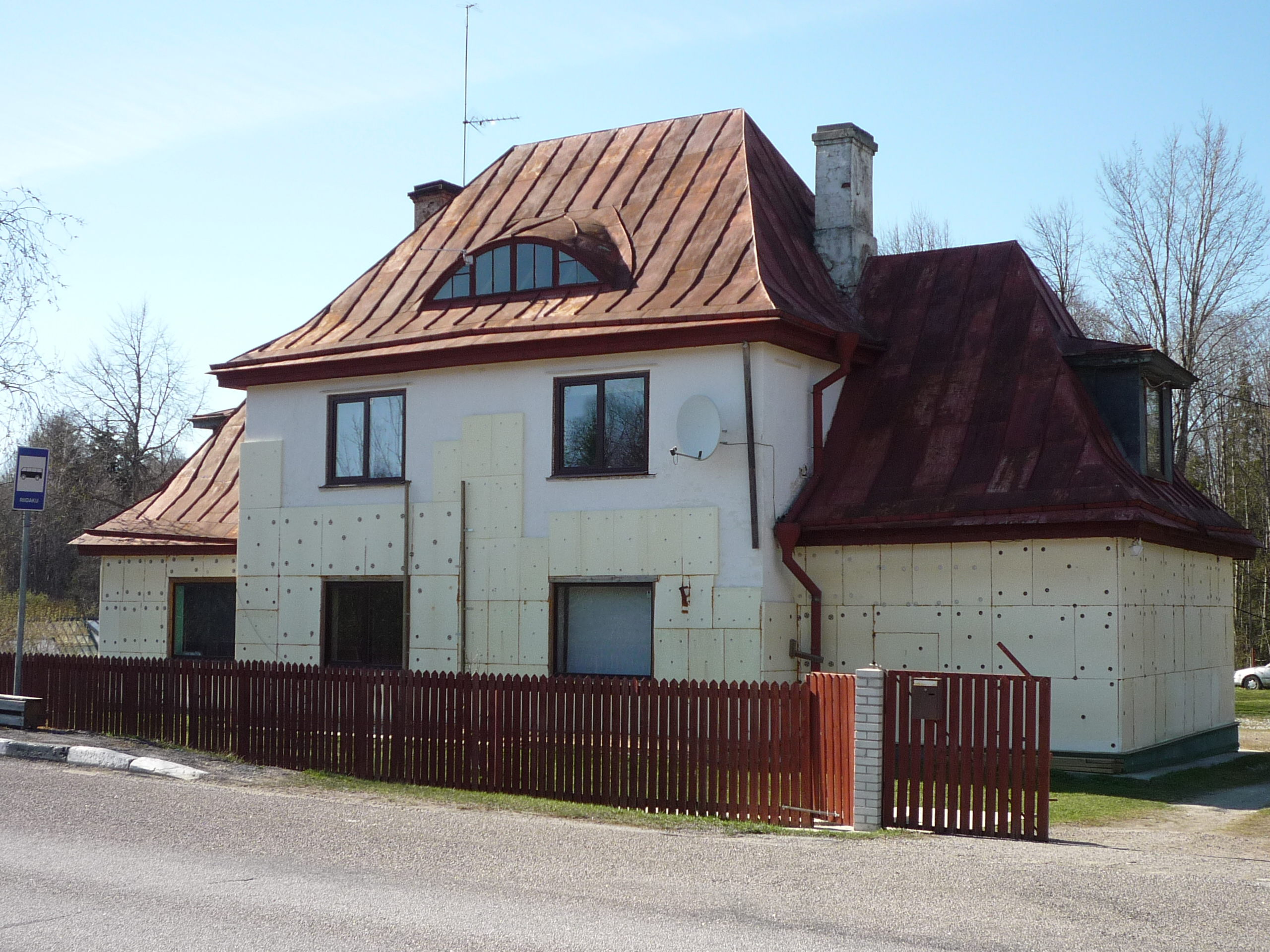
- Former railway station
- Interactive map of Pühatu
- Country: Estonia
- County: Rapla County
- Parish: Märjamaa Parish
- Time zone: UTC+2 (EET)
  - Summer (DST): UTC+3 (EEST)

Pühatu is a village in Märjamaa Parish, Rapla County in northwestern Estonia. Between 1991 and 2017 (2017 marks the administrative reform of Estonian municipalities) the village was located in Raikküla Parish.
