= Kesküla =

Family name

Kesküla is an Estonian surname. Notable people with the surname include:

- Aleksander Kesküla (1882–1963), politician and revolutionary
- Kalev Kesküla (1959–2010), writer and journalist
- Kert Kesküla (1975–2011), basketball player

== See also ==
- Keskküla (disambiguation)
