= Jõeäär =

Family name

Origin
- Language: Estonian
- Meaning: "riverside"
- Region of origin: Estonia

Other names
- Variant form: Jõeääre

Jõeäär is an Estonian language toponymic surname meaning "riverside". As of 1 January 2021, 80 men and 75 women in Estonia have the surname Jõeäär. Jõeäär is ranked as the 1,121st most common surname for men in Estonia, and 1,381st for women. The surname Jõeäär is most common in Saare County, where 7.74 per 10,000 inhabitants of the county bear the surname.

Notable people bearing the surname Jõeäär include:

- Aleksander Jõeäär (1890–1959), politician and lawyer
- Gert Jõeäär (born 1987), road bicycle racer
