= Tolli =

Village in Estonia

Coordinates: 58°51′N 24°20′E

- Village
- Interactive map of Tolli
- Country: Estonia
- County: Rapla County
- Parish: Märjamaa Parish
- Time zone: UTC+2 (EET)
  - Summer (DST): UTC+3 (EEST)

Tolli (German: Pargenthal) is a village in Märjamaa Parish, Rapla County in western Estonia.
