= Mänd =

Family name

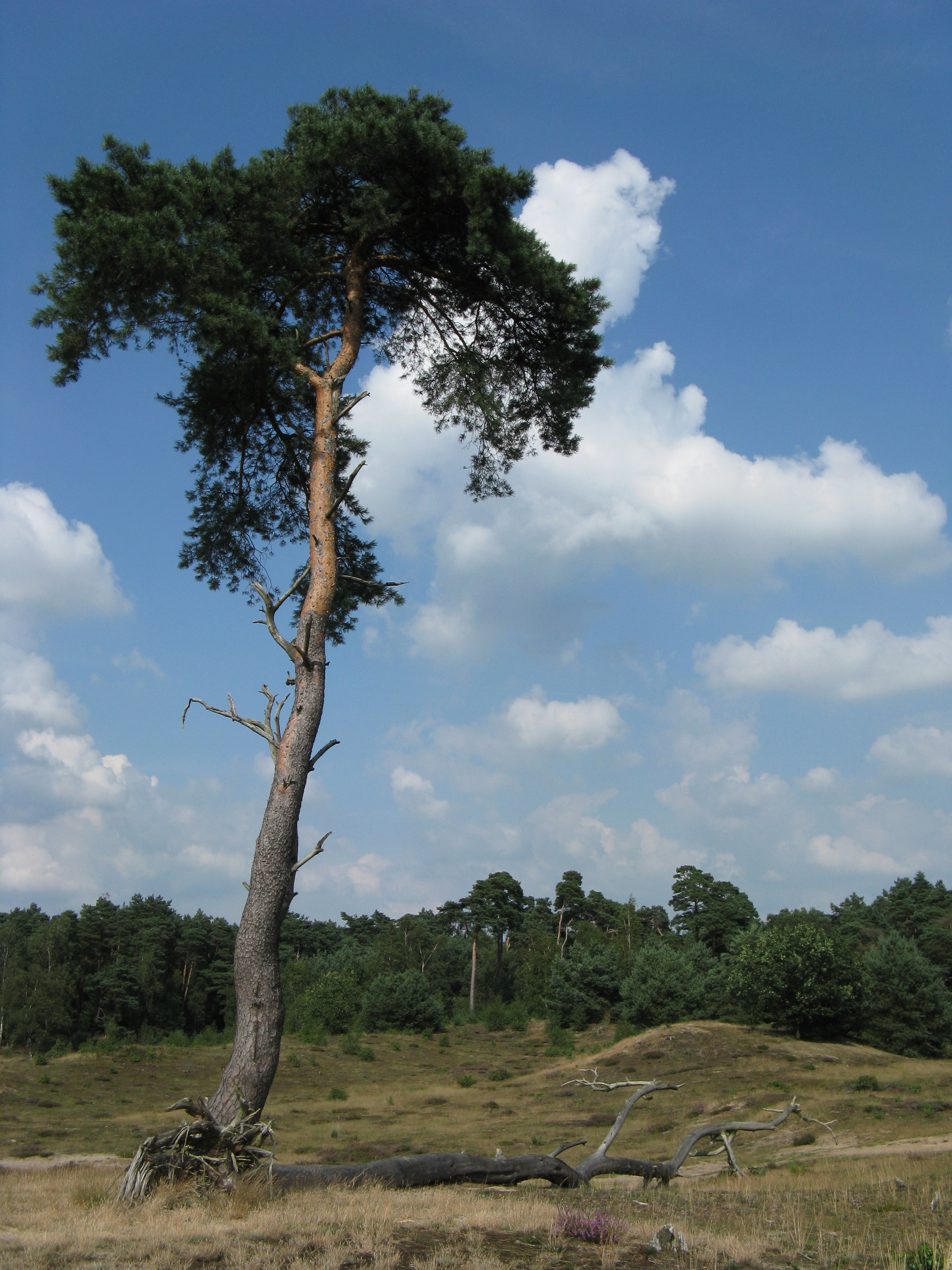

Origin
- Language: Estonian
- Meaning: Pine
- Region of origin: Estonia

Mänd is a common surname in Estonia (meaning pine), and may refer to:

- Ahti Mänd (born 1958), politician
- Heljo Mänd (1926–2020), children's writer
- Raivo Mänd (1954–2026), zoologist
- Tarmo Mänd (born 1950), politician

== See also ==
- Männik
