= Purga, Estonia =

Village in Estonia

Coordinates: 59°01′06″N 24°24′04″E

Purga
- Village
- Interactive map of Purga
- Country: Estonia
- County: Rapla County
- Parish: Märjamaa Parish
- Time zone: UTC+2 (EET)
  - Summer (DST): UTC+3 (EEST)

Purga is a village in Märjamaa Parish, Rapla County in western Estonia.
