= Kõrvetaguse =

Village in Estonia

Coordinates: 58°58′N 24°32′E

- Village
- Interactive map of Kõrvetaguse
- Country: Estonia
- County: Rapla County
- Parish: Märjamaa Parish
- Time zone: UTC+2 (EET)
  - Summer (DST): UTC+3 (EEST)

Kõrvetaguse (German: Körwentack) is a village in Märjamaa Parish, Rapla County in northwestern Estonia. Between 1991–2017 (until the administrative reform of Estonian municipalities) the village was located in Raikküla Parish.
