= Käriselja =

Village in Estonia

Coordinates: 58°48′N 24°32′E

- Village
- Interactive map of Käriselja
- Country: Estonia
- County: Rapla County
- Parish: Märjamaa Parish
- Time zone: UTC+2 (EET)
  - Summer (DST): UTC+3 (EEST)

Käriselja is a village in Märjamaa Parish, Rapla County in western Estonia.
