= Veski, Rapla County =

Village in Estonia

Coordinates: 58°47′25″N 24°31′56″E

Veski
- Village
- Interactive map of Veski
- Country: Estonia
- County: Rapla County
- Parish: Märjamaa Parish
- Time zone: UTC+2 (EET)
  - Summer (DST): UTC+3 (EEST)

Veski is a village in Märjamaa Parish, Rapla County in western Estonia.

Actor, theatre director and pedagogue Ants Lauter (1894–1973) was born in Veski.
