= Mõraste =

Village in Estonia

Coordinates: 58°54′N 24°19′E

- Village
- Interactive map of Mõraste
- Country: Estonia
- County: Rapla County
- Parish: Märjamaa Parish
- Time zone: UTC+2 (EET)
  - Summer (DST): UTC+3 (EEST)

Mõraste is a village in Märjamaa Parish, Rapla County in western Estonia. It is located on the bank of the Kasari River
