= Russalu =

Village in Estonia

Coordinates: 59°01′N 24°23′E

- Village
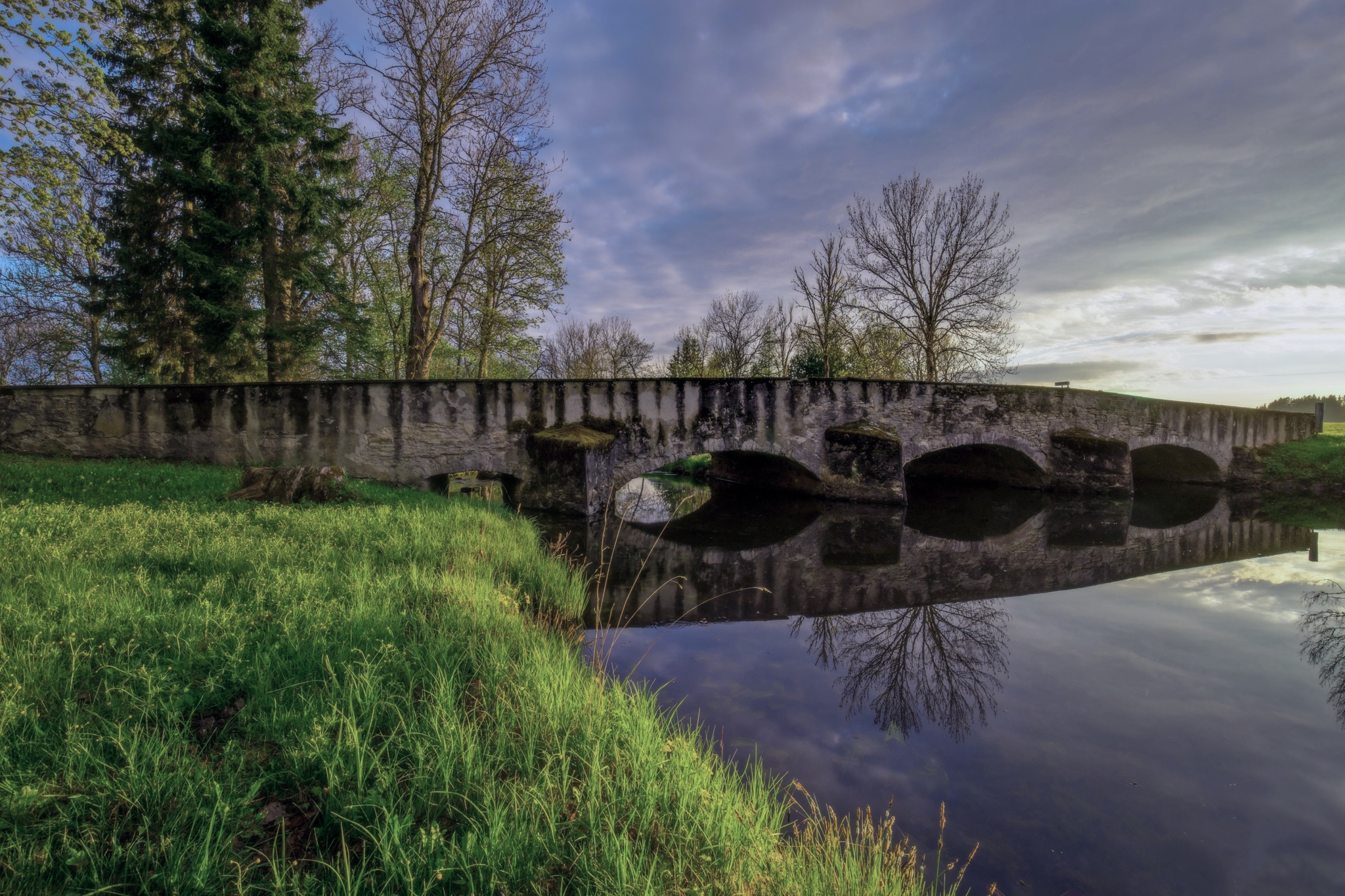
- Russalu manor bridgle over the Kasari River
- Interactive map of Russalu
- Country: Estonia
- County: Rapla County
- Parish: Märjamaa Parish
- Time zone: UTC+2 (EET)
  - Summer (DST): UTC+3 (EEST)

Russalu is a village in Märjamaa Parish, Rapla County in western Estonia.
