= Napanurga =

Village in Estonia

Coordinates: 59°02′N 24°23′E

- Village
- Interactive map of Napanurga
- Country: Estonia
- County: Rapla County
- Parish: Märjamaa Parish
- Time zone: UTC+2 (EET)
  - Summer (DST): UTC+3 (EEST)

Napanurga is a village in Märjamaa Parish, Rapla County in western Estonia.
