= Raela =

Village in Estonia

Coordinates: 58°57′N 24°46′E

- Village
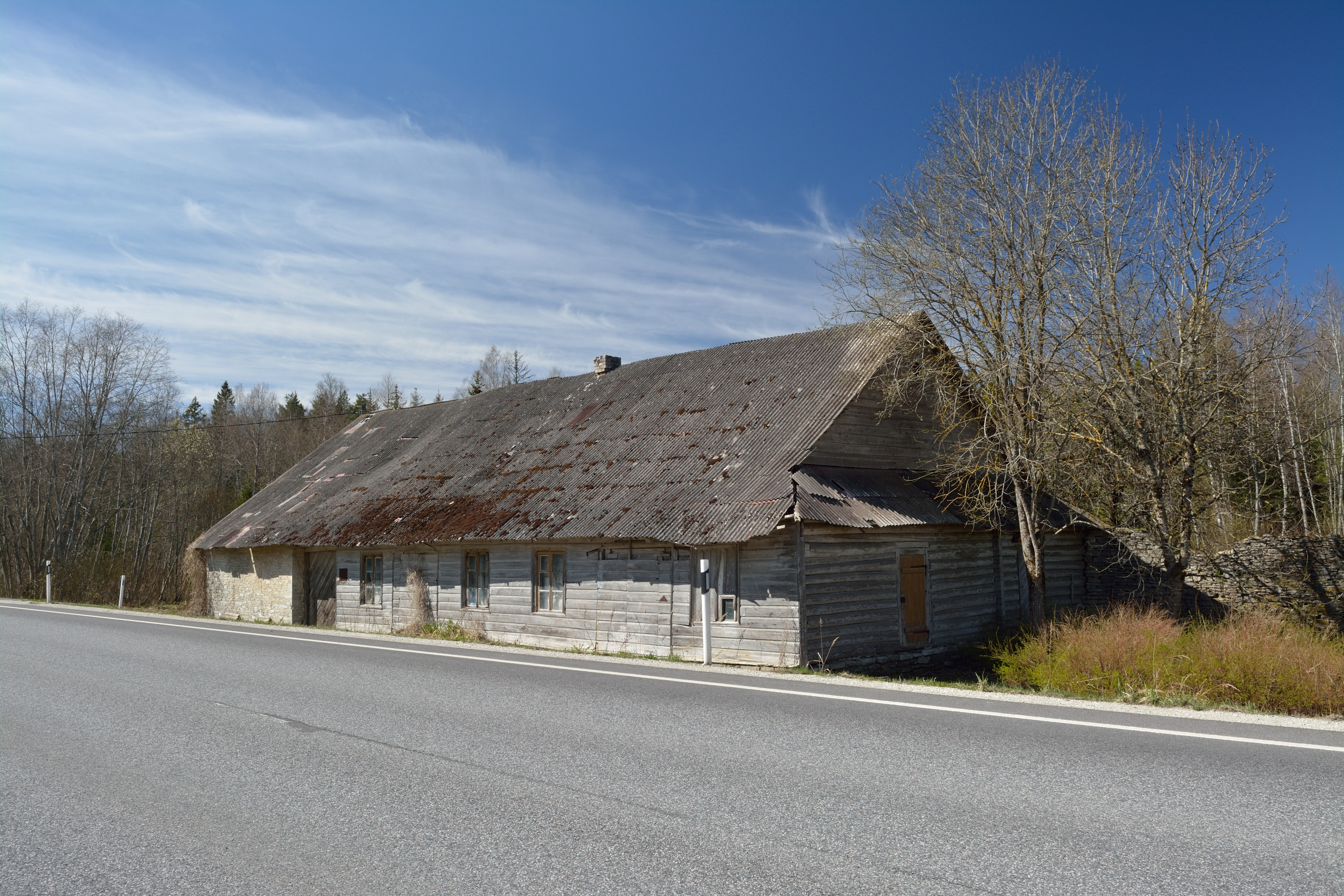
- Interactive map of Raela
- Country: Estonia
- County: Rapla County
- Parish: Rapla Parish
- Time zone: UTC+2 (EET)
  - Summer (DST): UTC+3 (EEST)

Raela is a village in Rapla Parish, Rapla County in northwestern Estonia. Between 1991 and 2017 (until the administrative reform of Estonian municipalities) the village was located in Raikküla Parish.
