= Päädeva =

Village in Estonia

Coordinates: 58°56′16″N 24°26′36″E

- Village
- Interactive map of Päädeva
- Country: Estonia
- County: Rapla County
- Parish: Märjamaa Parish
- Time zone: UTC+2 (EET)
  - Summer (DST): UTC+3 (EEST)

Päädeva (German: Pedua) is a village in Märjamaa Parish, Rapla County in western Estonia.
