= Aravere =

Village in Estonia

Coordinates: 58°45′35″N 24°28′15″E

- Village
- Interactive map of Aravere
- Country: Estonia
- County: Rapla County
- Parish: Märjamaa Parish

Population (2005)
  - Total: 11
- Time zone: UTC+2 (EET)
  - Summer (DST): UTC+3 (EEST)

Aravere is a village in Märjamaa Parish, Rapla County in western Estonia.
