= Männik =

Family name

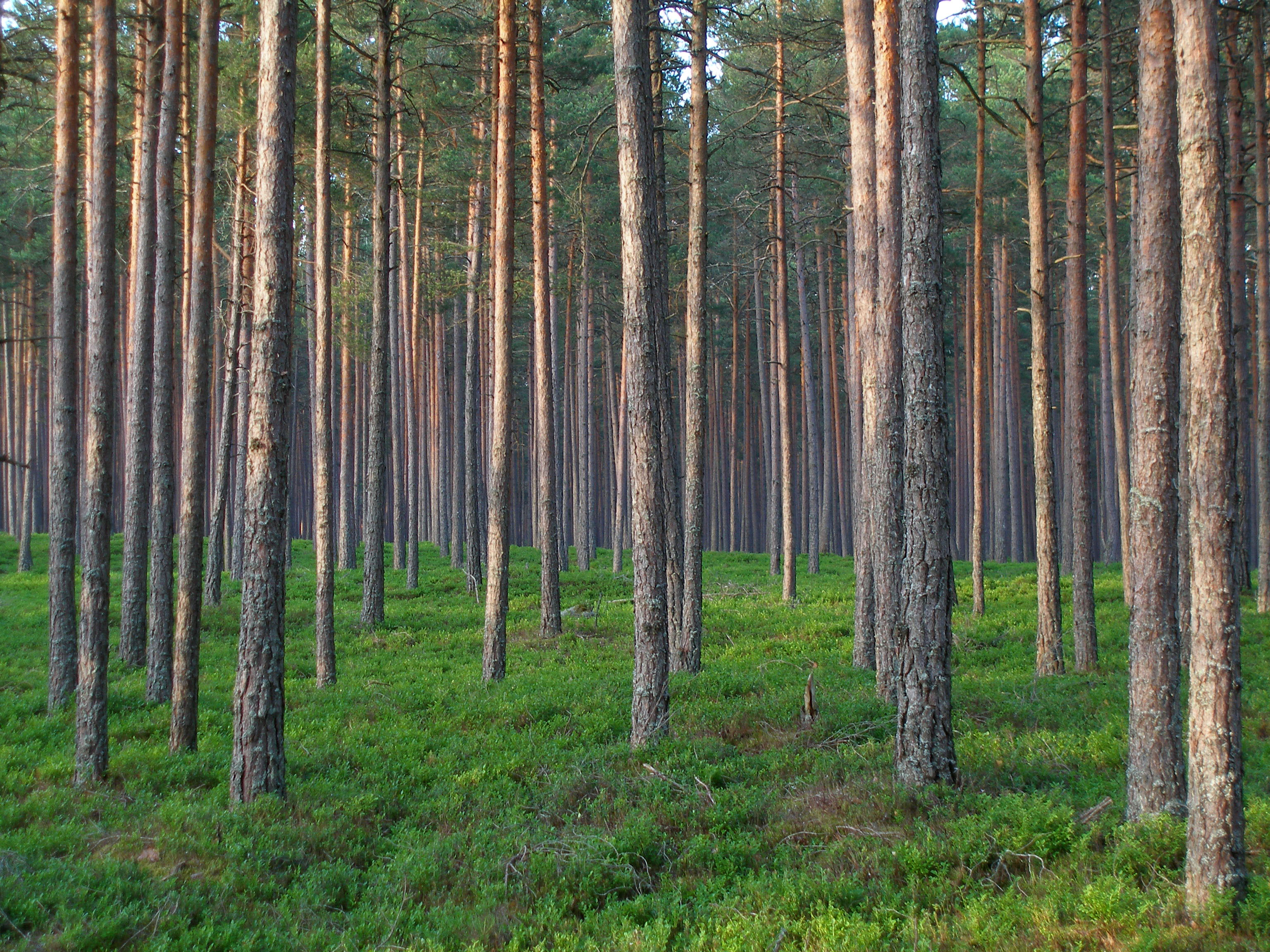
- Pine forest in Estonia.

Origin
- Language: Estonian
- Meaning: Pine forest
- Region of origin: Estonia

Other names
- Variant form: Mänd

Männik is an Estonian surname (meaning "pine forest"), and may refer to:

- Aarne Männik (born 1947), composer
- Eduard Männik (1906–1966), writer
- Jaanus Männik (born 1951), politician
- Priit Männik (born 1948), jurist

== See also ==
- Mänd
- Männiku (disambiguation)
