= Metsaküla =

Metsaküla may refer to several places in Estonia:

- Metsaküla, Hiiu County, village in Hiiumaa Parish, Hiiu County
- Metsaküla, Järva County, village in Türi Parish, Järva County
- Metsaküla, Jõgeva County, village in Mustvee Parish, Jõgeva County
- Metsaküla, Lääne County, village in Haapsalu City, Lääne County
- Metsaküla, Häädemeeste Parish, village in Häädemeeste Parish, Pärnu County
- Metsaküla, Põhja-Pärnumaa Parish, village in Põhja-Pärnumaa Parish, Pärnu County
- Metsaküla, Saaremaa Parish, village in Saaremaa Parish, Saare County
- Metsaküla, Viljandi County, village in Mulgi Parish, Viljandi County
- Kõruse-Metsaküla (formerly Metsaküla), village in Saaremaa Parish, Saare County
- Lussu (formerly Metsaküla), village in Saaremaa Parish, Saare County

== See also ==
- Metsküla (disambiguation)
