= Valli, Estonia =

Village in Estonia

Valli
- Village
- Location within Estonia
- Coordinates: 58°53′N 24°46′E
- Country: Estonia
- County: Rapla County
- Parish: Rapla Parish

Population (2006)
  - Total: 72
- Time zone: UTC+2 (EET)
  - Summer (DST): UTC+3 (EEST)

Valli is a village in Rapla Parish, Rapla County in northwestern Estonia. Between 1991–2017 (until the administrative reform of Estonian municipalities) the village was located in Raikküla Parish.
