= Ülejõe, Märjamaa Parish =

Village in Estonia

Coordinates: 58.99705°N 24.54810°E

Ülejõe
- Village
- Interactive map of Ülejõe
- Country: Estonia
- County: Rapla County
- Parish: Märjamaa Parish
- Time zone: UTC+2 (EET)
  - Summer (DST): UTC+3 (EEST)

Ülejõe is a village in Märjamaa Parish, Rapla County, in western Estonia.
