= Valgu, Rapla County =

Village in Estonia

Coordinates: 58°48′53″N 24°35′39″E

Valgu
- Village
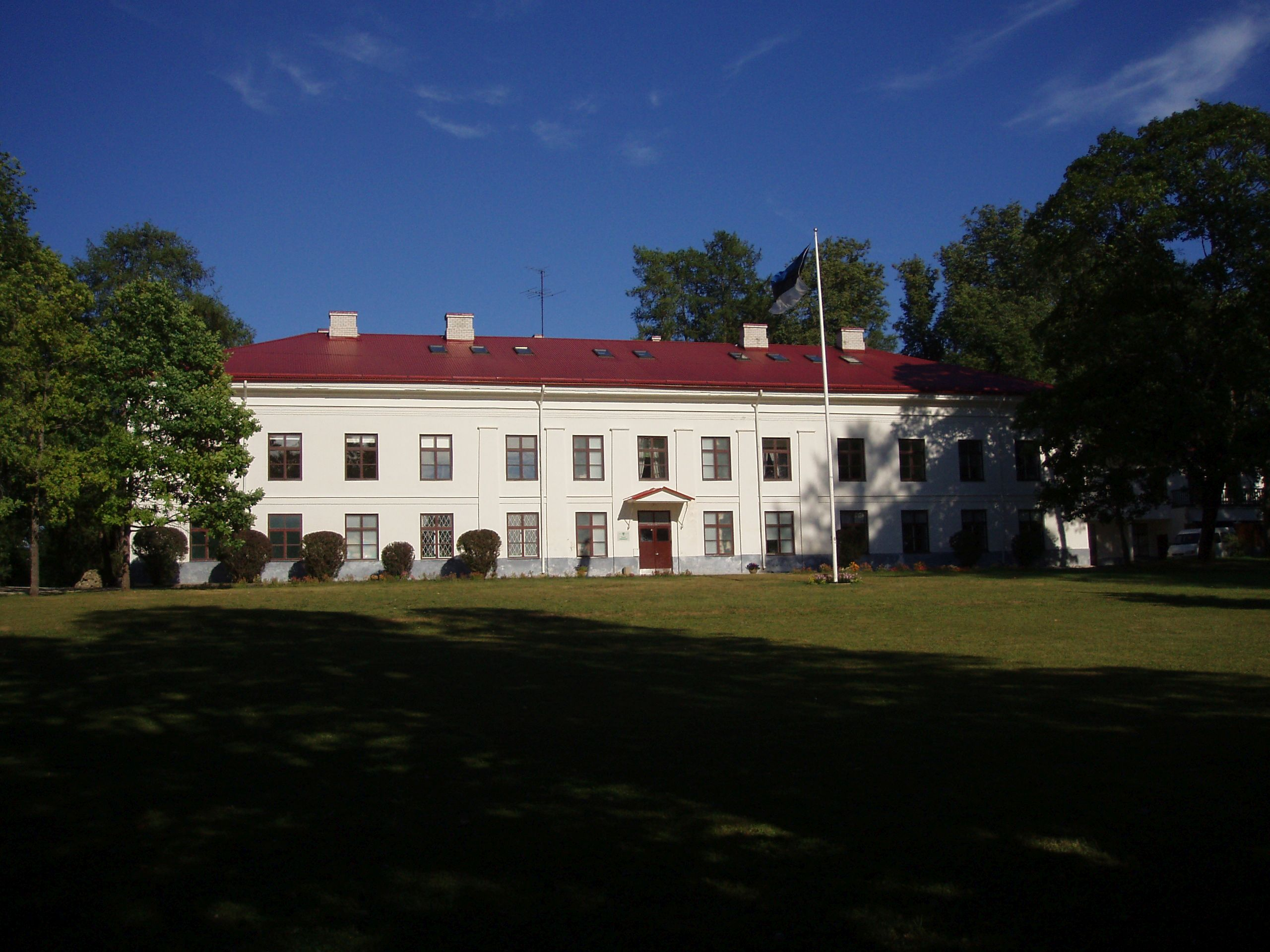
- Valgu knight's manor
- Interactive map of Valgu
- Country: Estonia
- County: Rapla County
- Parish: Märjamaa Parish

Population (2020)
  - Total: 233
- Time zone: UTC+2 (EET)
  - Summer (DST): UTC+3 (EEST)

Valgu (German: Walck) is a village in Märjamaa Parish, Rapla County in western Estonia.
