= Nurme, Rapla County =

Village in Estonia

Coordinates: 58°44′06″N 24°35′20″E

Nurme
- Village
- Interactive map of Nurme
- Country: Estonia
- County: Rapla County
- Parish: Märjamaa Parish
- Time zone: UTC+2 (EET)
  - Summer (DST): UTC+3 (EEST)

Nurme is a village in Märjamaa Parish, Rapla County in western Estonia. As of 2021, it has a population of 42.
