= Teenuse =

Village in Estonia

Coordinates: 58°49′N 24°13′E

- Village
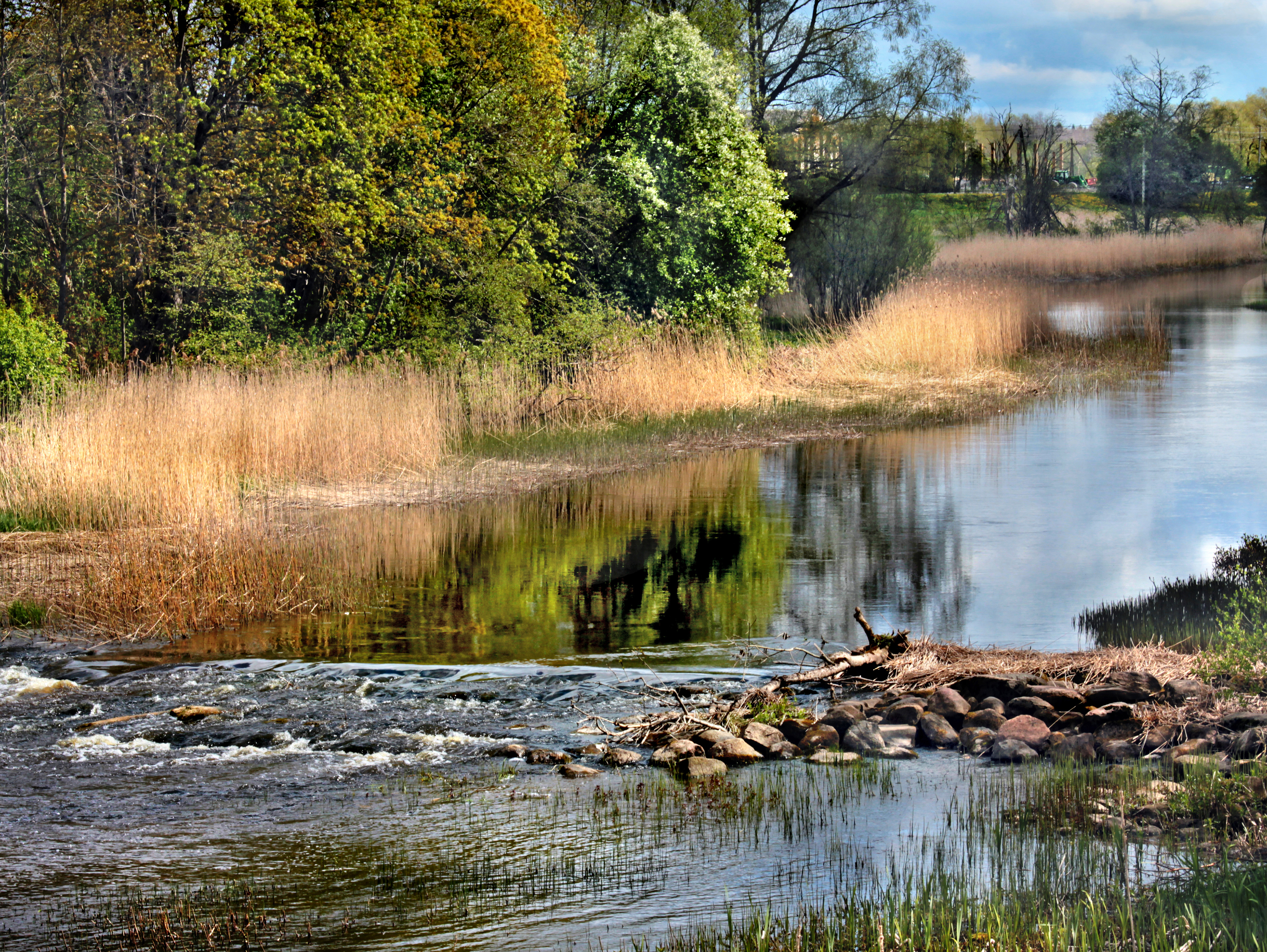
- The Kasari River passing through Teenuse
- Interactive map of Teenuse
- Country: Estonia
- County: Rapla County
- Parish: Märjamaa Parish
- Time zone: UTC+2 (EET)
  - Summer (DST): UTC+3 (EEST)

Teenuse (German: Stenhusen) is a village in Märjamaa Parish, Rapla County, in western Estonia.
