= Keskküla, Rapla County =

Village in Estonia

Coordinates: 58°47′19″N 24°28′46″E

Keskküla
- Village
- Interactive map of Keskküla
- Country: Estonia
- County: Rapla County
- Parish: Märjamaa Parish
- Time zone: UTC+2 (EET)
  - Summer (DST): UTC+3 (EEST)

Keskküla is a village in Märjamaa Parish, Rapla County in western Estonia.

== Name ==
Keskküla was attested in written sources as Keskyll in 1712 and Keskül in 1798; in addition, the villagers Keskell Ado, Kesküll Hindrich, and Kesküll May (referring to men belonging to Velise Manor) were attested in 1726. The name literally means 'middle village'.
