= Kohatu, Rapla County =

Village in Estonia

Kohatu
- Village
- Location in Estonia
- Coordinates: 58°57′55″N 24°17′02″E
- Country: Estonia
- County: Rapla County
- Parish: Märjamaa Parish
- Time zone: UTC+2 (EET)
  - Summer (DST): UTC+3 (EEST)

Kohatu (German: Kohhat) is a village in Märjamaa Parish, Rapla County in western Estonia.
