= Raikküla Parish =

Former municipality of Estonia

Coordinates: 58°56′N 24°46′E

Raikküla Parish Raikküla vald
- Former municipality of Estonia
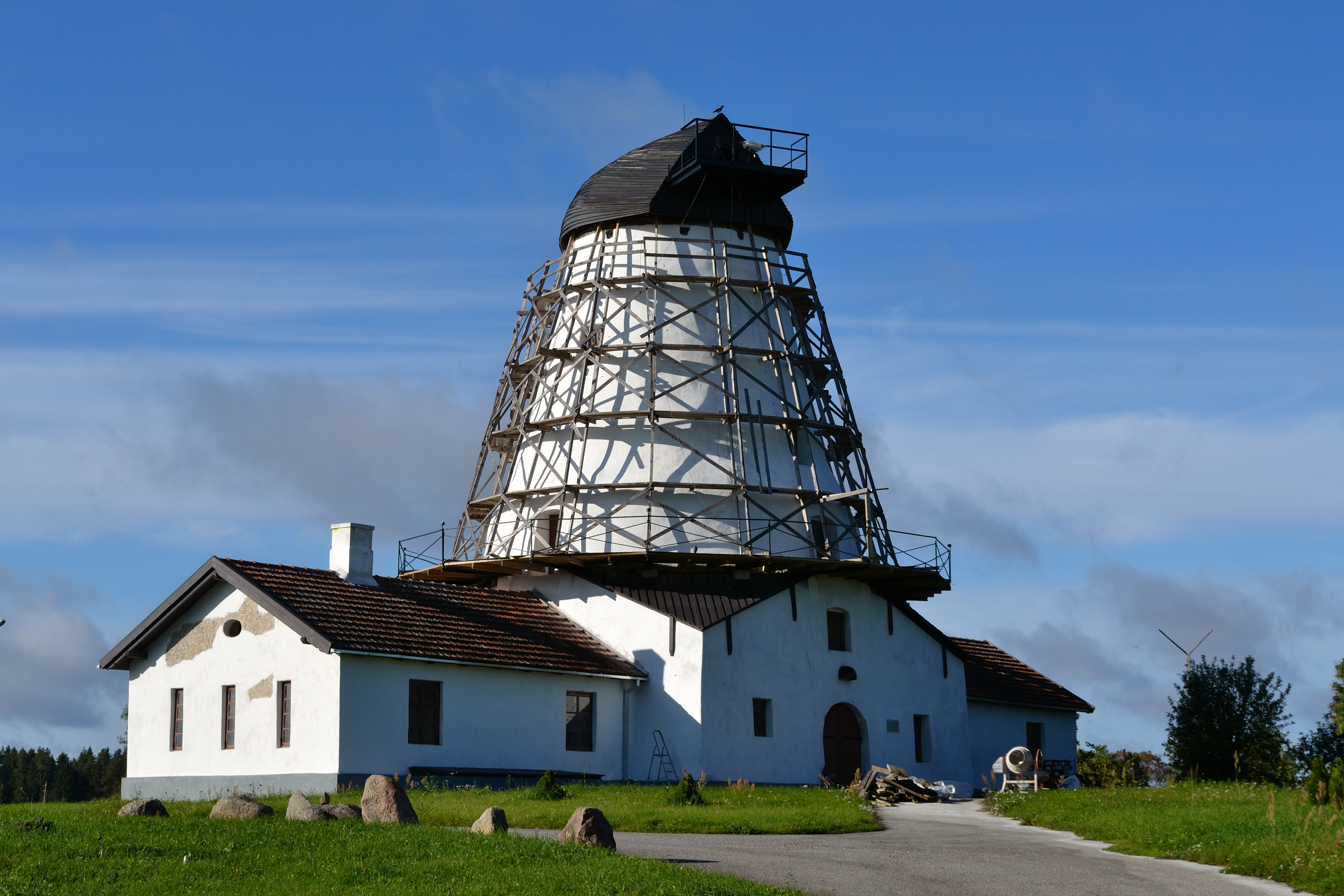
- Järvakandi windmill

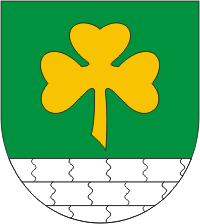
- Flag Coat of arms

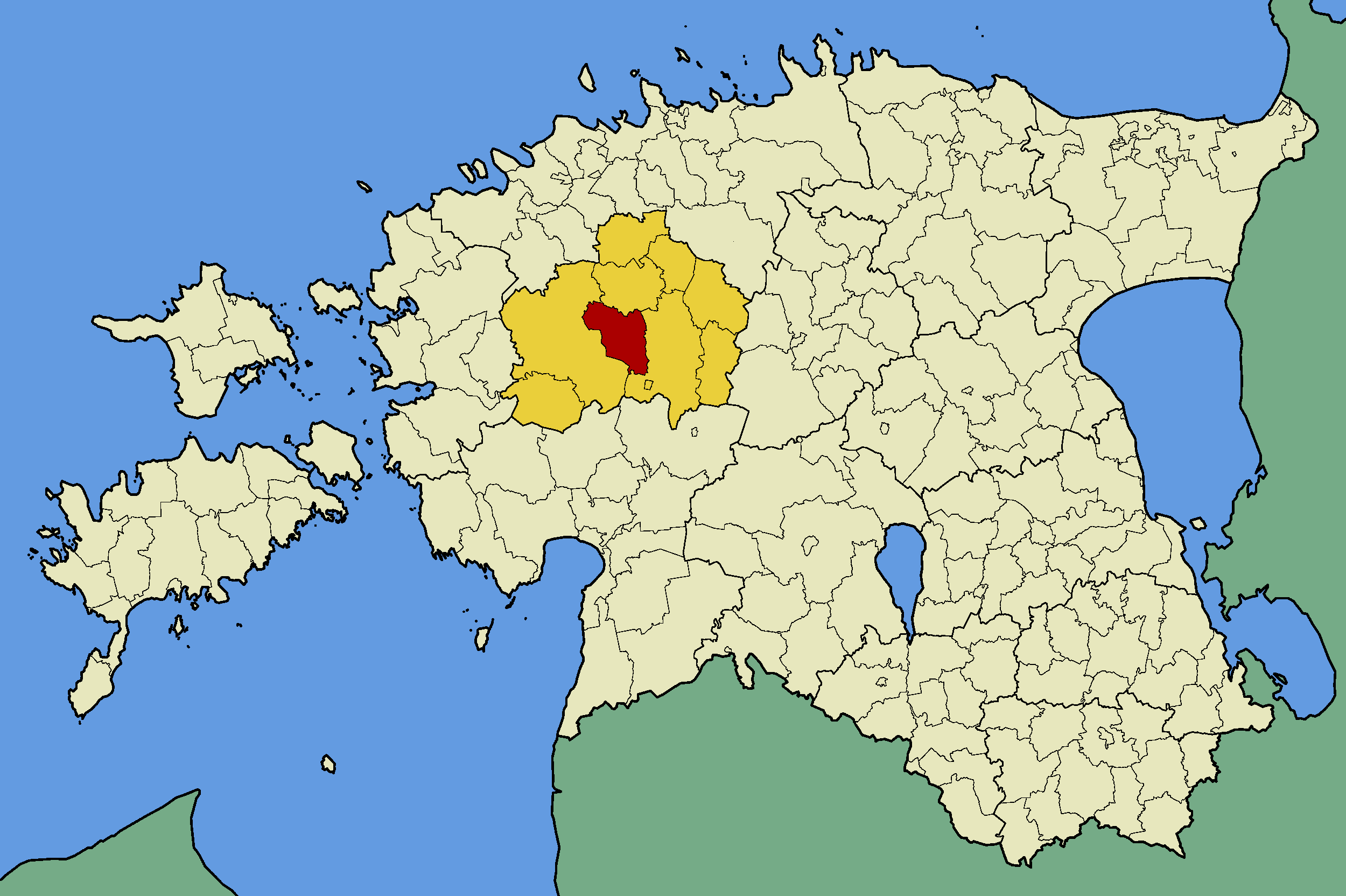
- Raikküla Parish within Rapla County.
- Country: Estonia
- County: Rapla County
- Administrative centre: Tamme

Area
  - Total: 224.2 km^{2} (86.6 sq mi)

Population (01.01.2006)
  - Total: 1,754
  - Density: 7.823/km^{2} (20.26/sq mi)
- Website: www.raikkyla.ee

Raikküla Parish (Estonian: Raikküla vald) was an Estonian municipality located in Rapla County. It had a population of 1,754 (as of 1 January 2006) and an area of 224.2 km^{2}.

== Settlements ==
Villages

Jalase - Kaigepere - Keo - Koikse - Kõrvetaguse - Lipa - Lipametsa - Loe - Lõpemetsa - Metsküla - Nõmmemetsa - Nõmmküla - Põlma - Pühatu - Purku - Raela - Raikküla - Riidaku - Tamme - Ummaru - Vahakõnnu - Valli
