= Metsküla, Rapla Parish =

Village in Estonia

Coordinates: 58°52′06″N 24°38′04″E

Metsküla
- Town
- Interactive map of Metsküla
- Country: Estonia
- County: Rapla County
- Parish: Rapla Parish
- Time zone: UTC+2 (EET)
  - Summer (DST): UTC+3 (EEST)

Metsküla is a village in Rapla Parish, Rapla County in northwestern Estonia. Between 1991–2017 (until the administrative reform of Estonian municipalities) the village was located in Raikküla Parish.

The village is located in the central-eastern part of Rapla County, near the Vigala River and close to the borders with Järva County and Harju County.
