= Metsküla, Märjamaa Parish =

Village in Estonia

Coordinates: 58°51′47″N 24°34′43″E

Metsküla
- Village
- Interactive map of Metsküla
- Country: Estonia
- County: Rapla County
- Parish: Märjamaa Parish
- Time zone: UTC+2 (EET)
  - Summer (DST): UTC+3 (EEST)

Metsküla is a village in Märjamaa Parish, Rapla County in western Estonia.
