= Orgita =

Village in Estonia

- Location within Estonia
- Coordinates: 58°55′43″N 24°25′44″E
- Country: Estonia
- County: Rapla County
- Time zone: UTC+2 (EET)

Orgita (German: Rosenthal) is a settlement in Märjamaa Parish, Rapla County in western Estonia.
