= Altküla, Rapla County =

Village in Estonia

Altküla
- Village
- Location within Estonia
- Coordinates: 58°52′04″N 24°29′38″E
- Country: Estonia
- County: Rapla County
- Parish: Märjamaa Parish
- Time zone: UTC+2 (EET)
  - Summer (DST): UTC+3 (EEST)

Altküla is a village in Märjamaa Parish, located in Rapla County in western Estonia.
