= Käbiküla, Märjamaa Parish =

Village in Estonia

Coordinates: 59°04′58″N 24°28′43″E

Käbiküla
- Village
- Interactive map of Käbiküla
- Country: Estonia
- County: Rapla County
- Parish: Märjamaa Parish
- Time zone: UTC+2 (EET)
  - Summer (DST): UTC+3 (EEST)

Käbiküla is a village in Märjamaa Parish, Rapla County in western Estonia.
