= Valgu-Vanamõisa =

Village in Estonia

Coordinates: 58°50′18″N 24°35′05″E

- Village
- Interactive map of Valgu-Vanamõisa
- Country: Estonia
- County: Rapla County
- Parish: Märjamaa Parish
- Time zone: UTC+2 (EET)
  - Summer (DST): UTC+3 (EEST)

Valgu-Vanamõisa (Vanamõisa until 2017) is a village in Märjamaa Parish, Rapla County in western Estonia.
