= Kilgi, Rapla County =

Village in Estonia

Coordinates: 58°47′15″N 24°27′38″E

Kilgi
- Village
- Interactive map of Kilgi
- Country: Estonia
- County: Rapla County
- Parish: Märjamaa Parish
- Time zone: UTC+2 (EET)
  - Summer (DST): UTC+3 (EEST)

Kilgi is a village in Märjamaa Parish, Rapla County in western Estonia.
