= Sipa, Estonia =

Village in Estonia

Coordinates: 58°54′46″N 24°17′47″E

Sipa
- Village
- Interactive map of Sipa
- Country: Estonia
- County: Rapla County
- Parish: Märjamaa Parish
- Time zone: UTC+2 (EET)
  - Summer (DST): UTC+3 (EEST)

Sipa (German: Sipp) is a village in Märjamaa Parish, Rapla County in western Estonia.
