= Mõisamaa, Rapla County =

Village in Estonia

Coordinates: 58°52′56″N 24°32′16″E

Mõisamaa
- Village
- Interactive map of Mõisamaa
- Country: Estonia
- County: Rapla County
- Parish: Märjamaa Parish
- Time zone: UTC+2 (EET)
  - Summer (DST): UTC+3 (EEST)

Mõisamaa (German: Moisama) is a village in Märjamaa Parish, Rapla County in western Estonia.
