= Märjamaa Parish =

Municipality of Estonia (2017)

Coordinates: 58°54′14″N 24°25′50″E

Märjamaa Parish Märjamaa vald
- Municipality of Estonia
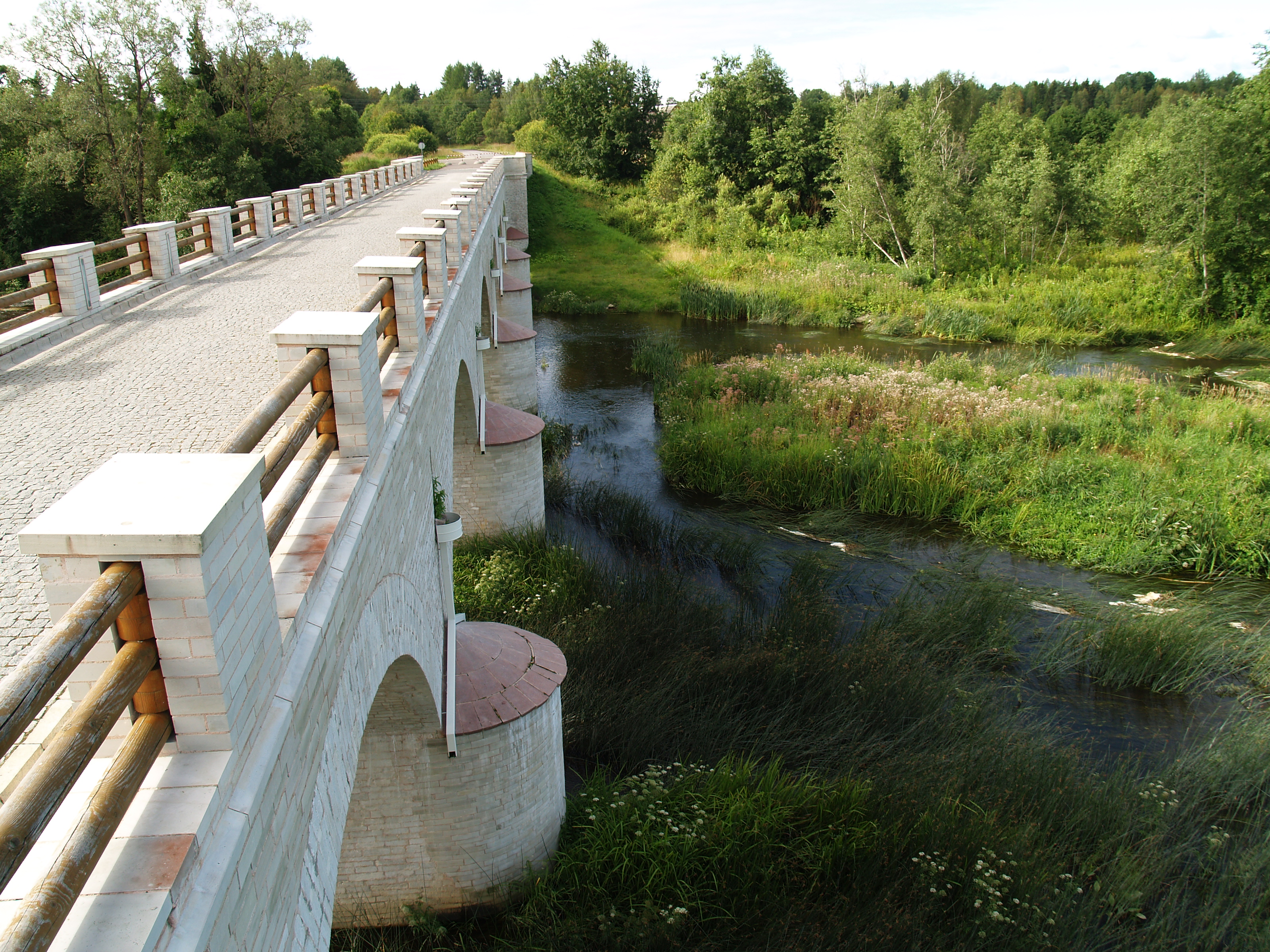
- Konuvere bridge

- Flag Coat of arms

- Märjamaa Parish within Rapla County.
- Country: Estonia
- County: Rapla County
- Administrative centre: Märjamaa

Area
  - Total: 1,164 km^{2} (449 sq mi)

Population (2019)
  - Total: 7,535
  - Density: 6.473/km^{2} (16.77/sq mi)
- ISO 3166 code: EE-503
- Website: www.marjamaa.ee

Märjamaa Parish (Estonian: Märjamaa vald) is an Estonian municipality located in Rapla County. It had a population of 7,015 (as of November 2012) and an area of 1,164 km^{2} (336.54 mi^{2}). Märjamaa Parish was the biggest municipality in Estonia by area.

In 2017 it was merged with Vigala Parish and three villages from Raikküla Parish to form a new parish (also named Märjamaa Parish).

== Settlements ==
Borough

Märjamaa

Villages

Alaküla - Altküla - Aravere - Aruküla - Haimre - Hiietse - Inda - Jaaniveski - Jõeääre - Käbiküla - Kaguvere - Kangru - Käriselja - Kasti - Keskküla - Kiilaspere - Kilgi - Kirna - Kohatu - Kohtru - Koluta - Konuvere - Kõrtsuotsa - Kõrvetaguse - Kunsu - Laukna - Leevre - Lestima - Lokuta - Loodna - Luiste - Lümandu - Maidla - Mäliste - Männiku - Metsaääre - Metsküla - Mõisamaa - Moka - Mõraste - Nääri - Naistevalla - Napanurga - Nõmmeotsa - Nurme - Nurtu-Nõlva - Ohukotsu - Ojaäärse - Orgita - Päädeva - Paaduotsa - Paeküla - Paisumaa - Pajaka - Põlli - Pühatu - Purga - Rangu - Rassiotsa - Riidaku - Ringuta - Risu-Suurküla - Russalu - Sipa - Sõmeru - Sooniste - Soosalu - Sõtke - Sulu - Suurküla - Teenuse - Tolli - Ülejõe - Urevere - Vaimõisa - Valgu - Valgu-Vanamõisa - Vana-Nurtu - Varbola - Velise - Velisemõisa - Velise-Nõlva - Veski - Vilta - Võeva

== Religion ==
The population of Märjamaa parish is predominantly secular, with 81.9% of the population identifying as unaffiliated. Among those who do associate with a faith, 12% identify as Lutheran, 1.1% identify as Orthodox, while other Christian denominations make up 0.03% of the population. 4.9%, follows other religions or did not specify their religious affiliation.

== Notable people ==
- Paul von Rennenkampf (1854 in Konuvere – 1918), a Baltic German nobleman and general of the Imperial Russian Army
- Ants Laikmaa (1866 in Araste – 1942), painter, he brought impressionism home, a co-founder of the Estonian National Museum
- Mihkel Aitsam (1877 in Sääla – 1953), writer, journalist, and local historian.
- Anton Uesson (1879 in Haimre – 1942), politician and engineer, Deputy Mayor of Tallinn, 1919 to 1934
- Marta Lepp (1883 in Varbola – 1940), writer, editor, educator, and political and religious leader.
- Jaan Kruus (1884 in Sooniste – 1942), Estonian Major general
- Eberhard Vogdt (1902 in Kohatu – 1964), sailor in the 6 metre class in the 1928 Summer Olympics, which won the bronze medal
- Aksel Kuuse (1913 in Sipa – 1942), high jumper, competed in the 1936 Summer Olympics
- Tiina Kaalep (born 1964 in Vana-Vigala), journalist, broadcaster, and media manager.
- Tarvi Thomberg (born 1982 in Vana-Vigala), men's light heavyweight, Greco-Roman wrestler, competed at the 2004 Summer Olympics
