= Käbiküla, Kehtna Parish =

Village in Estonia

Coordinates: 58°54′56″N 24°51′27″E

Käbiküla
- Village
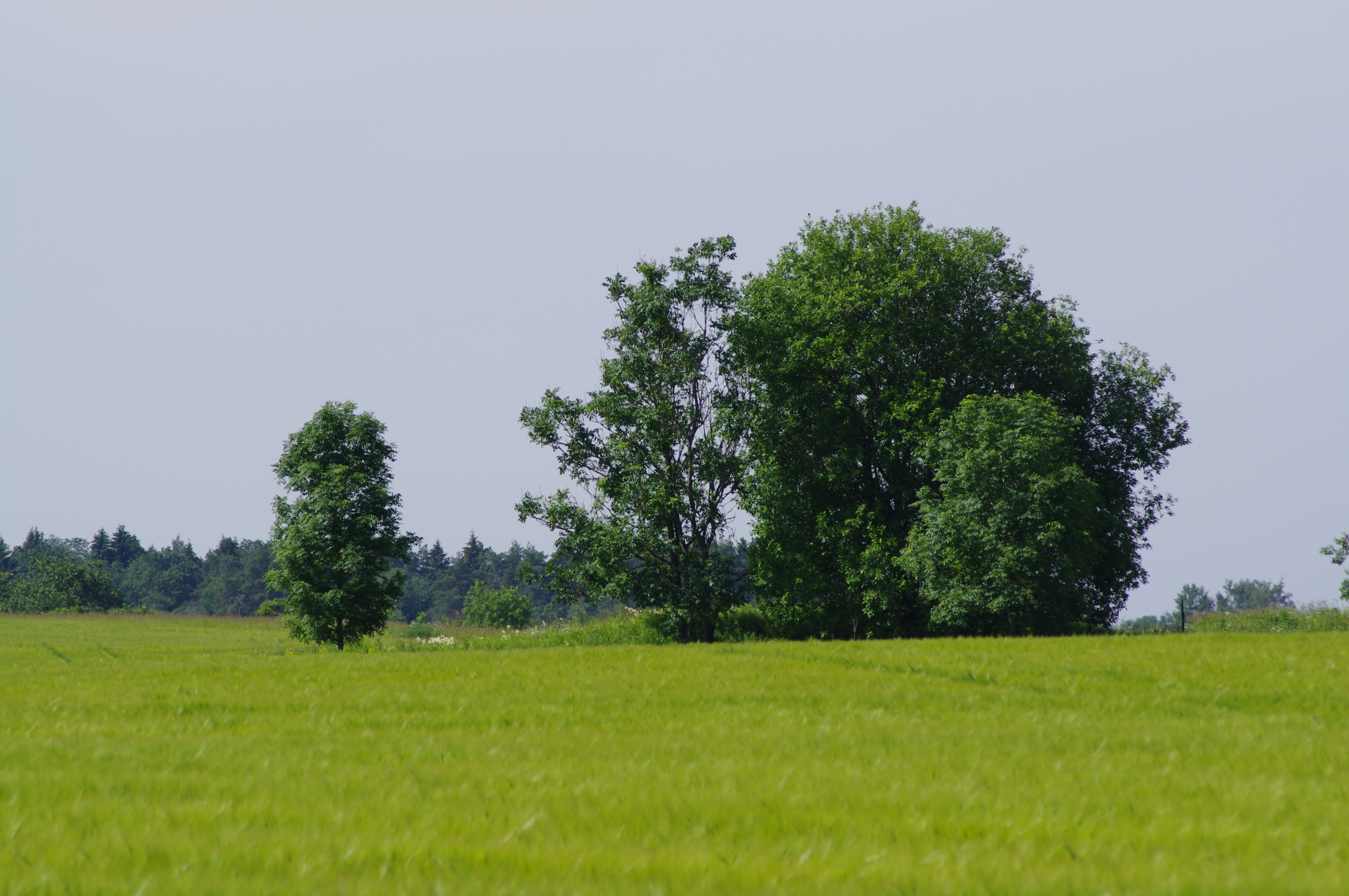
- Interactive map of Käbiküla
- Country: Estonia
- County: Rapla County
- Parish: Kehtna Parish
- Time zone: UTC+2 (EET)
  - Summer (DST): UTC+3 (EEST)

Käbiküla is a village in Kehtna Parish, Rapla County in northern-central Estonia.
