= Kabala, Rapla County =

Village in Estonia

Coordinates: 58°55′41″N 24°39′09″E

Kabala
- Village
- Interactive map of Kabala
- Country: Estonia
- County: Rapla County
- Parish: Rapla Parish
- Time zone: UTC+2 (EET)
  - Summer (DST): UTC+3 (EEST)

Kabala is a village in Rapla Parish, Rapla County in northwestern Estonia.

Kabala Manor is located in Kabala village.

== Gallery ==
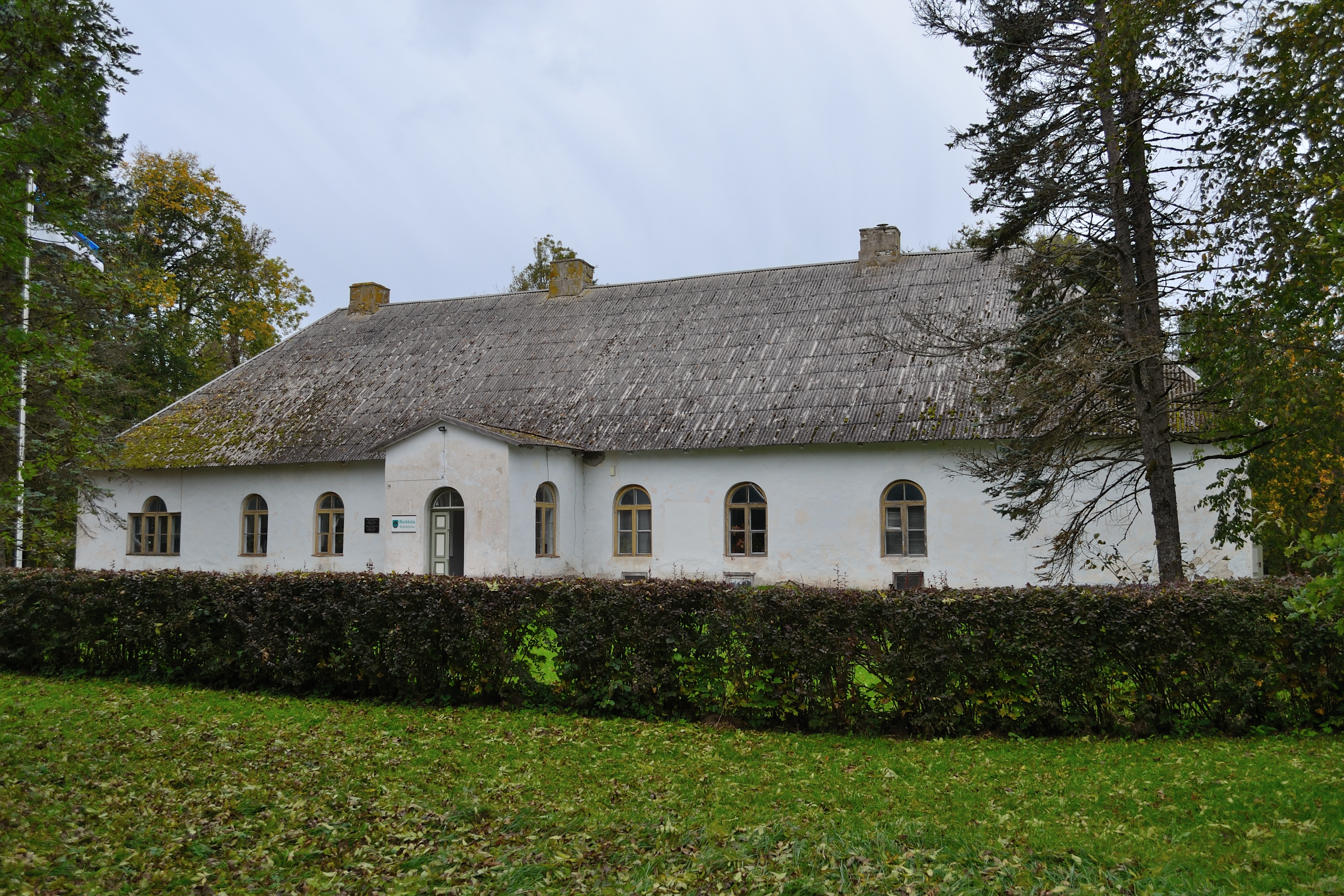
Kabala Manor, main building

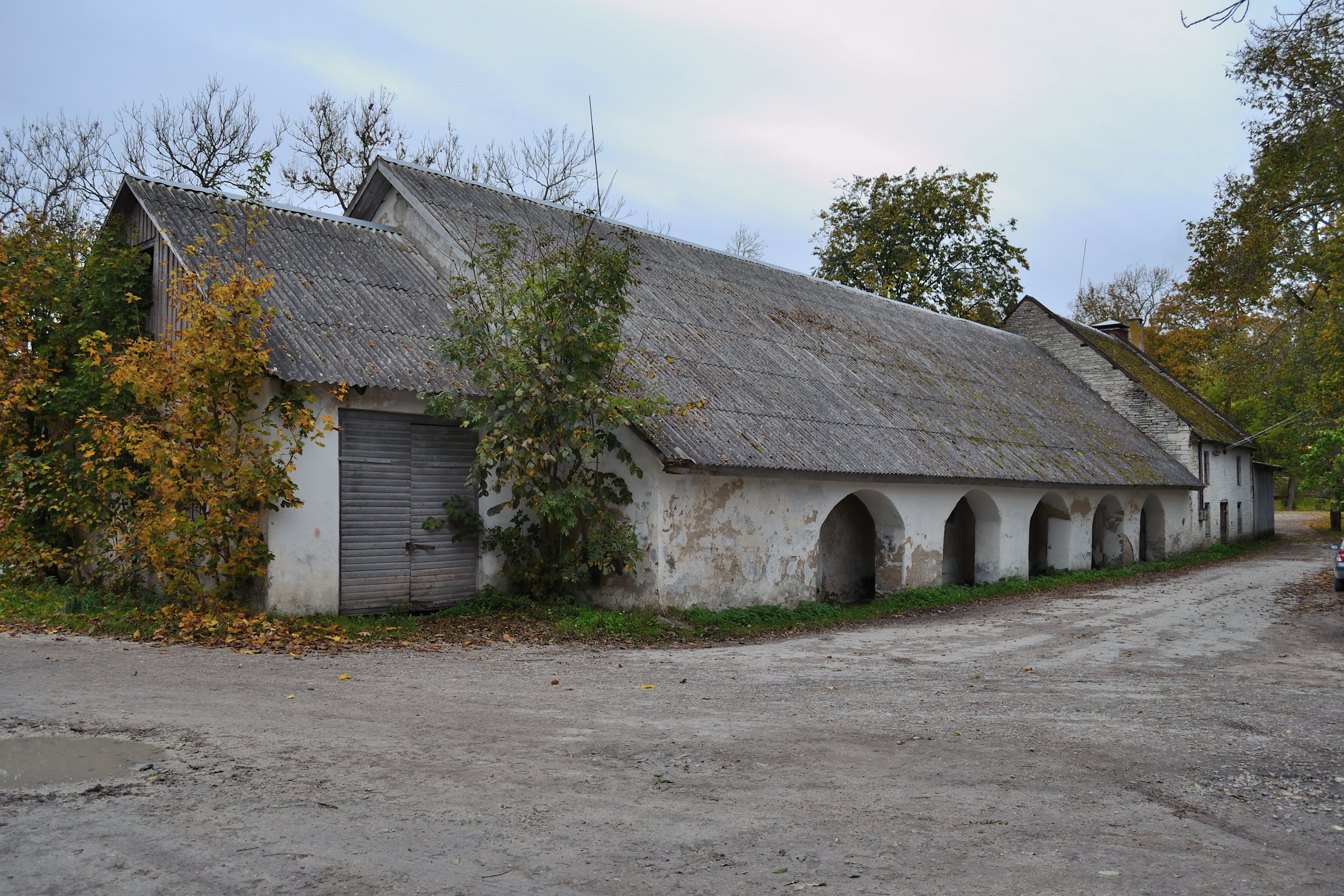
Kabala manor granary-dryer

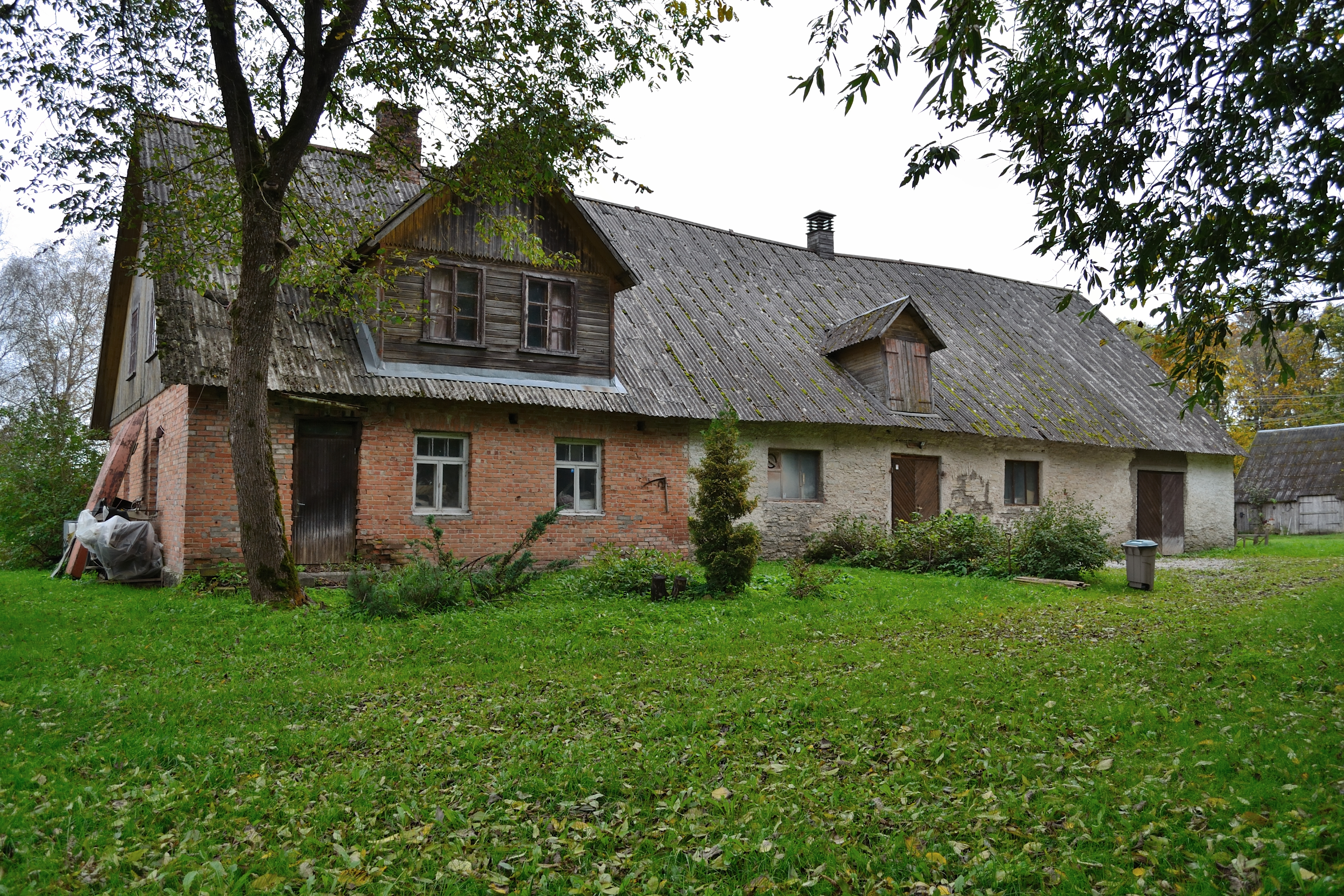
Kabala manor cattle barn

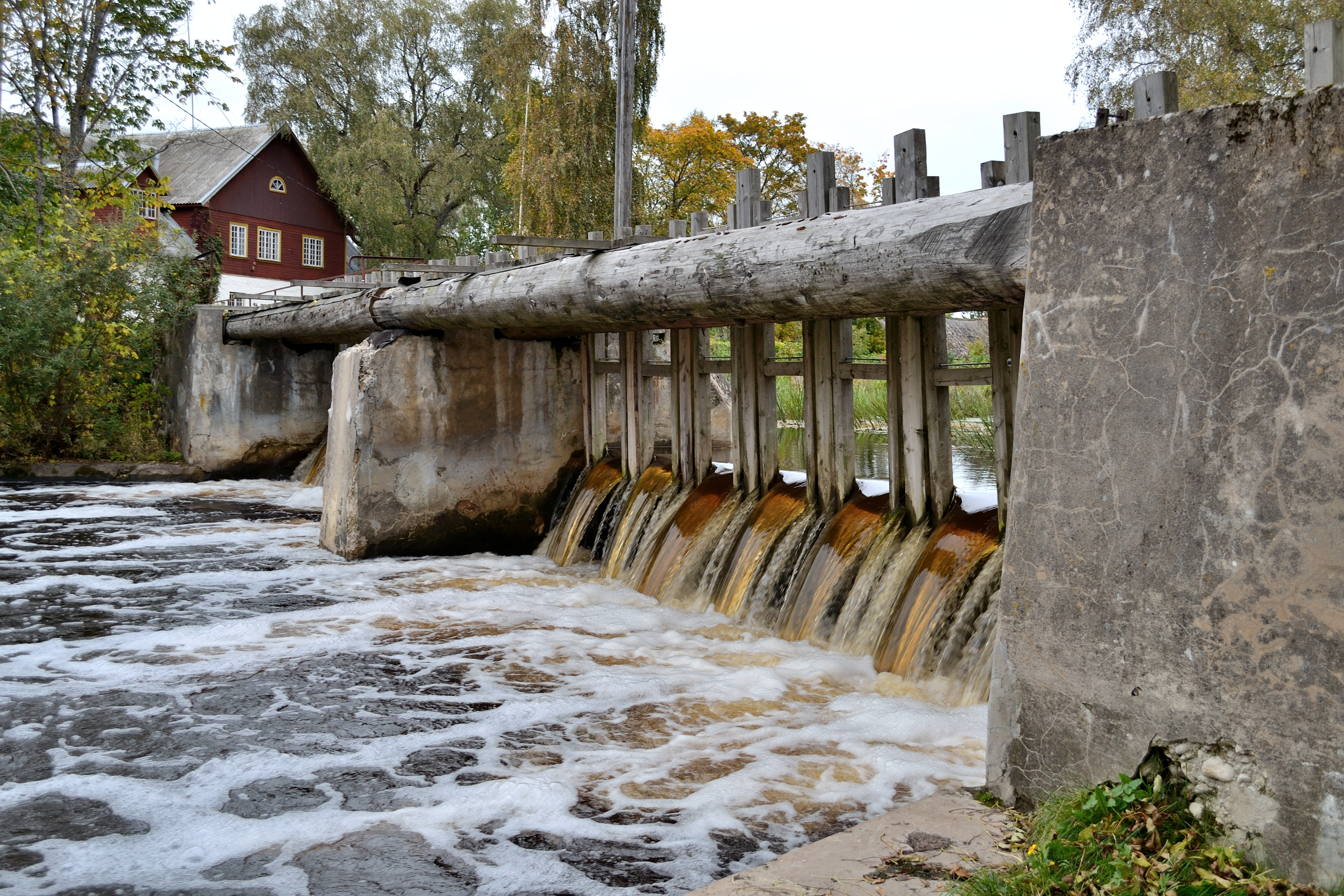
Dam of Kabala watermill

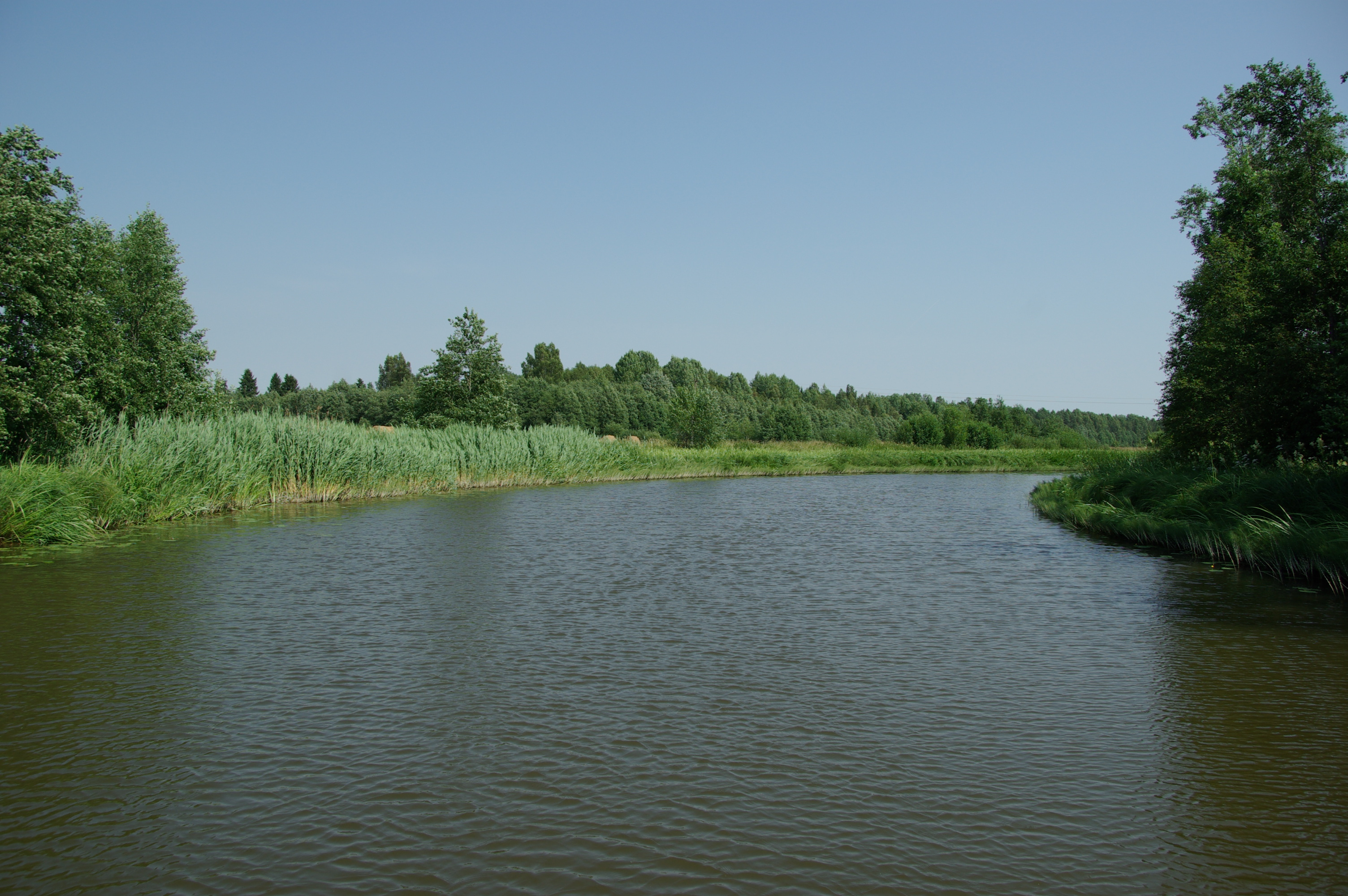
Vigala River in Tamme.
