= Mahtra sõda =

Book by Eduard Vilde

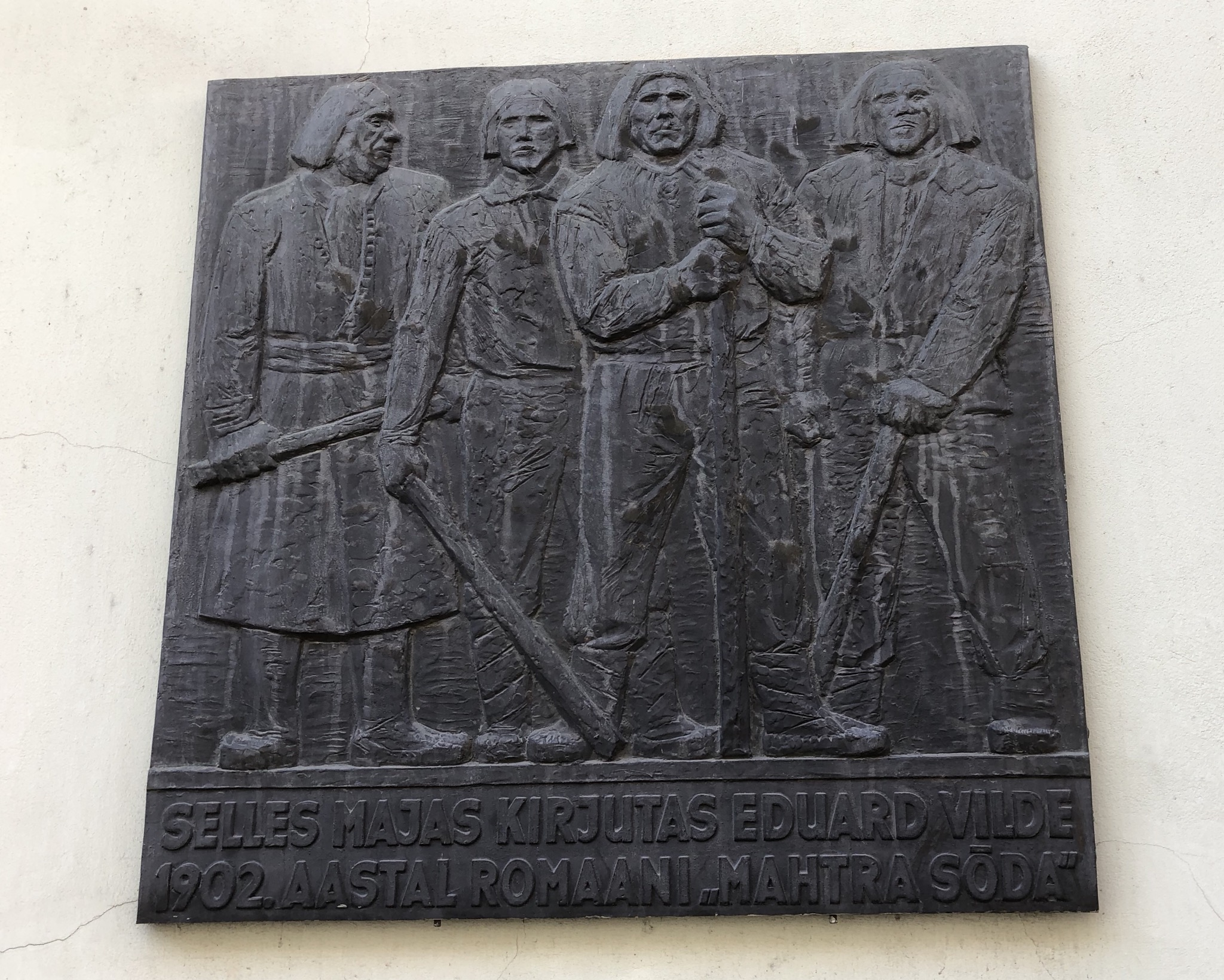
- Memorial plaque at Nunne 7 in Tallinn, where Eduard Vilde wrote Mahtra sõda
- Author: Eduard Vilde
- Language: Estonian
- Publisher: J. H. Wahtrik
- Publication date: 1902
- Publication place: Estonia
- Media type: Print

Mahtra sõda (The Mahtra War) is a 1902 novel by Eduard Vilde. It is the first part of a trilogy of historical novels about the peasant movements of the 1900s. The second work of the trilogy is Kui Anija mehed Tallinnas käisid (When Anija's Men Went to Tallinn, 1903), and the third part is Prohvet Maltsvet (Prophet Maltsvet, 1905–1908).

The novel is about the peasant insurgency known as the Mahtra War. The uprising took place from May to July 1858 at Mahtra Manor in the former Juuru Parish.

== Writing and publication ==
Vilde engaged in extensive research before writing the novel, working through historical works and archival sources. In addition, he used the manuscript memoires of Hans Tertsius and the reminiscences of people recorded in Juuru. The novel was first published in Teataja as a story in installments for almost five months in 1902. It was mostly written during the nighttime hours because during the day Vilde was busy with editorial work. "The printing house's courier would take the next installment of the manuscript, to be published that evening, from me early in the morning, and the last lines were often still wet," the author later recalled.

Mahtra sõda was first published in book form in 1902 by J. H. Wahtrik in Tallinn. The novel has been reprinted 13 times, most recently in 2009 in the Eesti lugu (Estonian Story) book series published by Eesti Päevaleht. The novel has been translated into Russian, Latvian, Hungarian, German, Finnish, Ukrainian, and Esperanto.

== Adaptations and events ==
The feature film Mahtra sõda, with a screenplay written and repeatedly revised by Paul Rummo from 1955 to 1958, was planned by Tallinnfilm with a premiere scheduled for mid-summer 1959. However, production of the film was halted due to censorship.

On May 30 and 31, 2008, to mark the 150th anniversary of the Mahtra War, the entire novel was recited without pausing in front of the Atla-Eeru Inn in Juuru. The readers included various actors (Elle Kull, Tõnu Aav, etc.) and 90 other readers of various ages and from various places. The reading was directed by Ago-Endrik Kerge, the artist Liina Pihlak, and the composer and actress Viive Ernesaks.
