= Atla-Eeru Inn =

Former inn in Estonia

Coordinates: 59.057229°N 24.973051°E

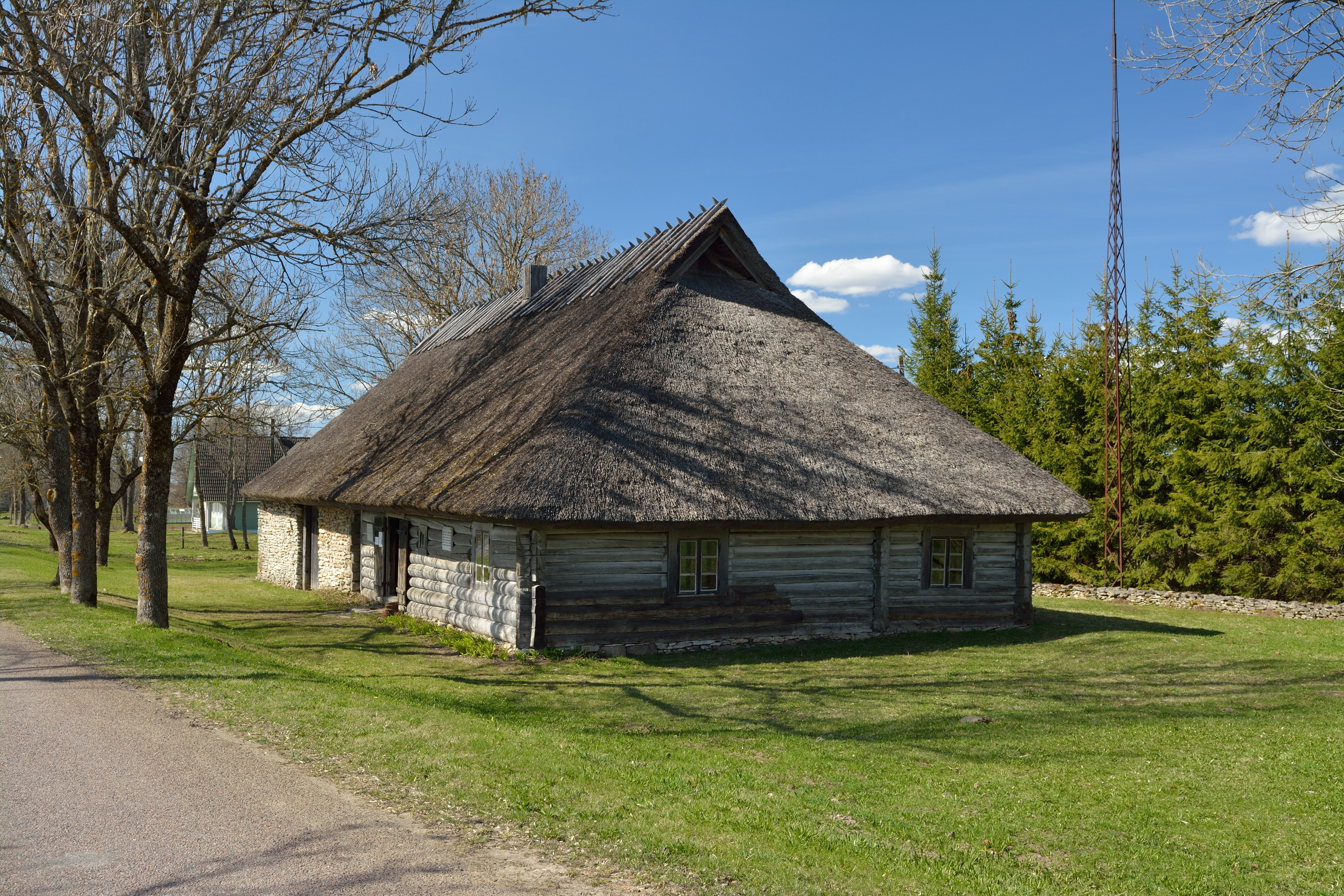
The Atla-Eeru Inn

The Atla-Eeru Inn (Estonian: Atla-Eeru kõrts) is a former inn in Juuru, Rapla Parish, Rapla County, Estonia. The inn building has been recognized as a national cultural monument.

The building was built as a log house in 1811 and converted into an inn in 1841.

During the Mahtra War, the Atla-Eeru Inn became a place where several gatherings of decisive importance took place. Here, by the light of a splinter lamp, the peasants of Atla and Mahtra studied the new Peasants' Law, which was the impetus for the protest. Early on they morning of June 2, 1858, several groups of peasants gathered at the inn, and together they headed to Mahtra. It was here, after the uprising, that the wounded were given first aid.

In 1958, the Atla-Eeru Inn was purchased for the Mahtra Peasant Museum.
