= Viktor Meister =

Estonian agronomist and economist (1925–2018)

Viktor Meister (18 October 1925 (Pirgu, Estonia) – 4 August 2018), was an Estonian agronomist and economist.

He studied at Juuru primary school in Härgla, and graduated from Vana-Vigala School of Agriculture in 1946, in 1947 in the Ancient Victory Technical Culture Technicum, and in 1966 as an agronomist of the Estonian University of Life Sciences.

He worked as an agronomist of the Habaja Sovkhoz (state farm) in 1948–1951, as Director of the Põdra sovkhoz between in 1951 and 1961, Director of Adavere Näidissovhoosi 1961–1980, V.I. Lenin's name Director of the Adavere Näidissovhoos 1980–1986 and Economist 1986–1990.

From 1962–1966 he was a member of the Supreme Soviet of the USSR. Member of the Central Committee of the ECB and member of the Committee on Budgets of the Supreme Soviet of the Estonian SSR.

During the Singing revolution, he was the leader of the Popular Front in the Jõgeva County.

== Awards ==
- 1966: Order of Lenin
- 1972: Agronomist of the Estonian SSR
- 1975: Order of the October Revolution
- 2002: Order of the White Star
