= Paul Rummo =

Estonian writer

Paul Rummo (14 July 1909 Kalbu, Kehtna Parish, Kreis Harrien – 28 March 1981) was an Estonian poet, playwright, and literary critic.

From 1948 to 1949, Rummo was the chief editor for the publishing house Ilukirjandus ja Kunst (Fiction and Art). Before 1958, he held several positions, including the head of Estonia Theatre. From 1955 to 1958, Rummo wrote and repeatedly revised the screenplay for the feature film Mahtra sõda (The Mahtra War). Production of the film was halted due to censorship and it was never released. In 1967, Rummo completed the anthology Eesti luule (Estonian Poetry).

His son is the writer Paul-Eerik Rummo.

== Works ==
- 1946: Võitlev kodumaa (The Fighting Homeland), poetry collection
- 1950: Rahva võim, poetry collection
- 1952: Katkukülvajad, poetry collection
- 1955: Veerev kivi (Rolling Stone), poetry collection
- 1961: Proloog ja poeemid, poetry collection
- 1969: Katkenud lõng, poetry collection
- 1979: Matkalaul, poetry collection
