= Lake Järlepa =

Lake in Estonia

- Järlepa järv (Estonian)
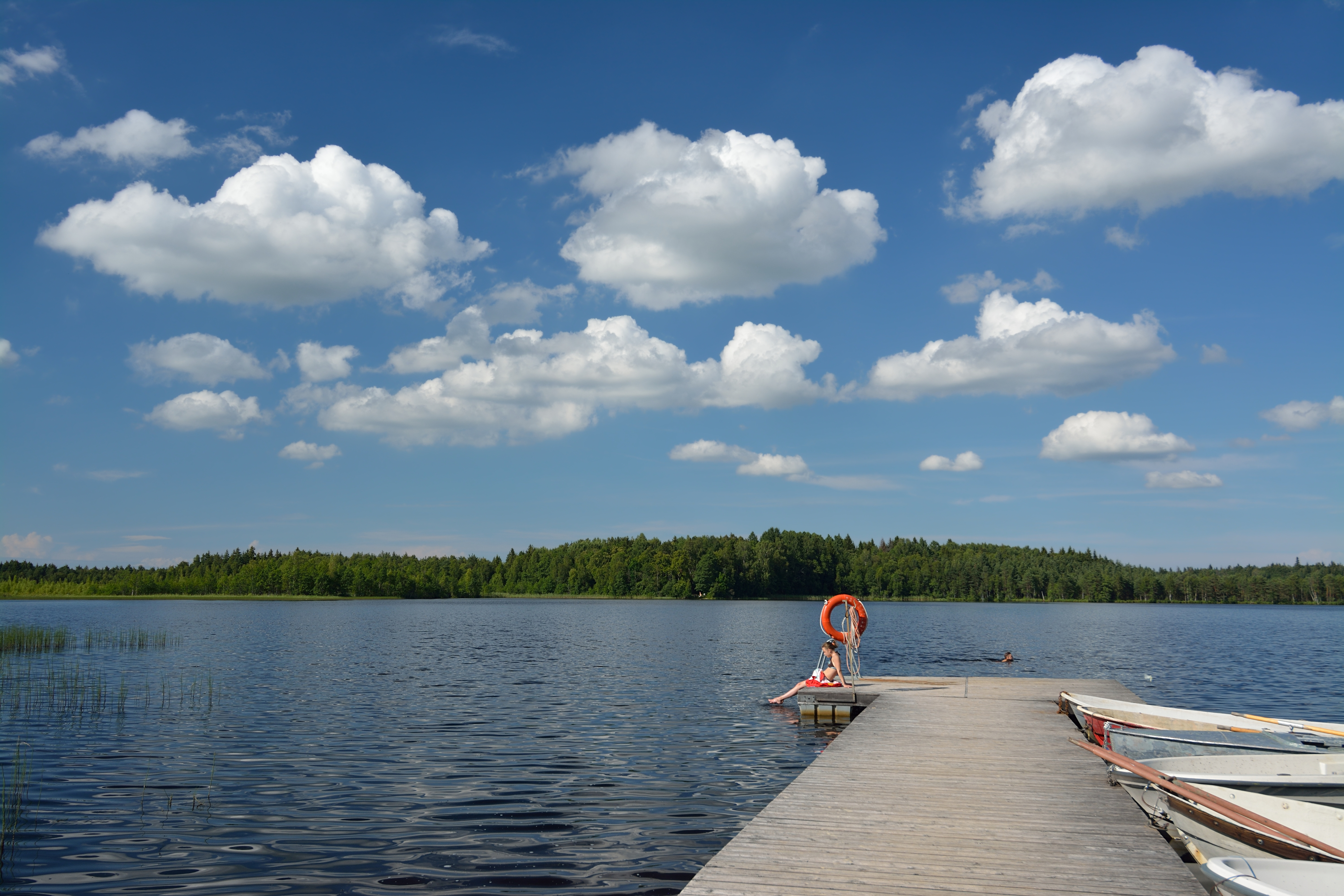

- Location within Estonia
- Location: Rapla Parish, Rapla County, Estonia
- Coordinates: 59.1444°N 24.9333°E
- Basin countries: Estonia
- Max. length: 1,470 meters (4,820 ft)
- Surface area: 45.4 hectares (112 acres)
- Average depth: 1.2 meters (3 ft 11 in)
- Max. depth: 3.3 meters (11 ft)
- Water volume: 622,000 cubic meters (22,000,000 cu ft)
- Shore length^{1}: 4,550 meters (14,930 ft)
- Surface elevation: 64.4 meters (211 ft)
- ^{1} Shore length is not a well-defined measure.

Lake Järlepa (Estonian: Järlepa järv, also Suur-Järlepa järv) is a lake in Estonia. It is part of the village of Järlepa in Rapla Parish, Rapla County. The lake belongs to the Mahtra Nature Reserve.

== Physical description ==
The lake has an area of 45.4 hectares (112 acres). The lake has an average depth of 1.2 meters (3 ft 11 in) and a maximum depth of 3.3 meters (11 ft). It is 1,470 meters (4,820 ft) long, and its shoreline measures 4,550 meters (14,930 ft). It has a volume of 622,000 cubic meters (22,000,000 cu ft).
