= Maidla, Rapla Parish =

Village in Estonia

Maidla
- Village
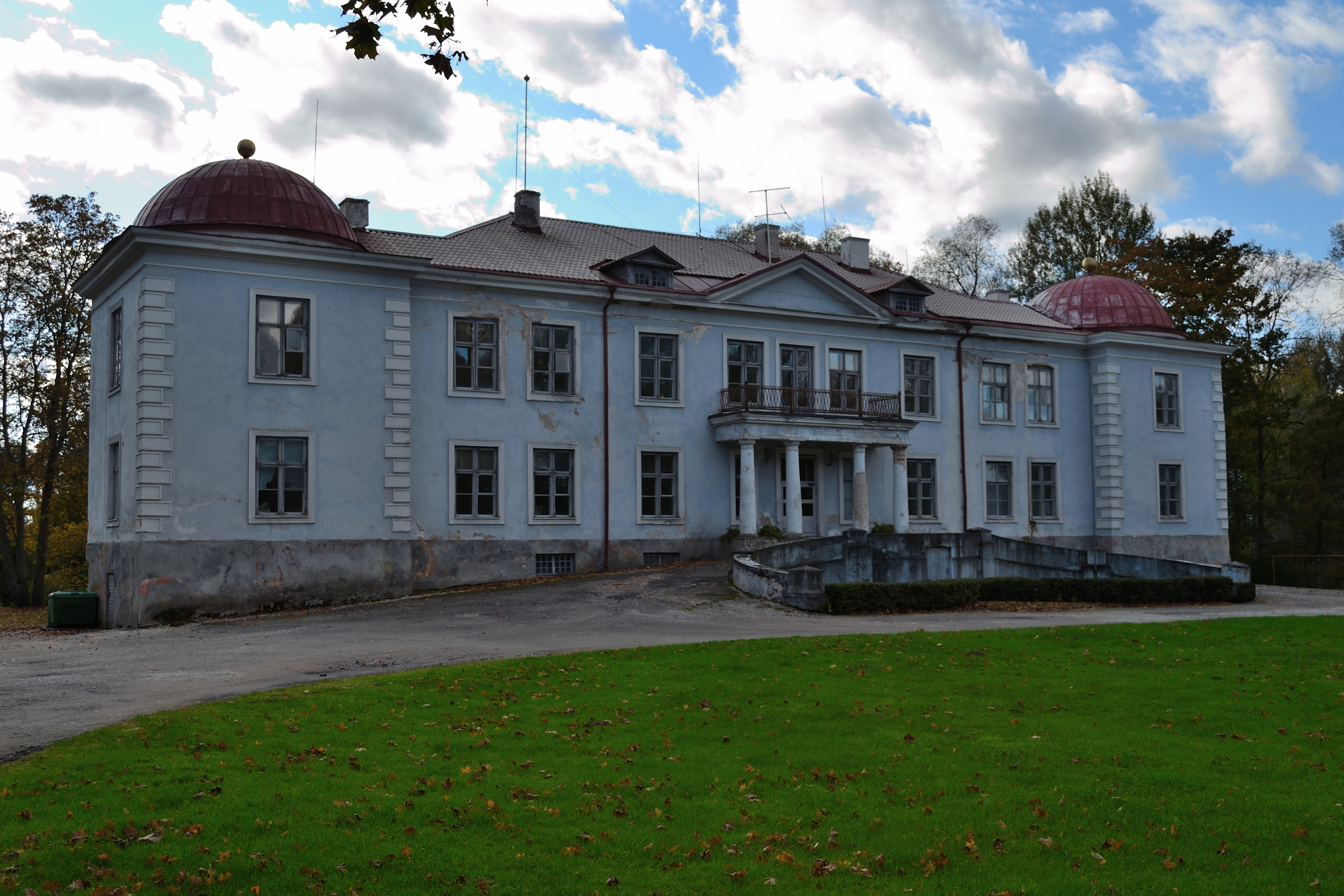
- Maidla manor main building

- Location in Estonia
- Coordinates: 59°03′00″N 24°53′00″E
- Country: Estonia
- County: Rapla County
- Parish: Rapla Parish
- Time zone: UTC+2 (EET)
  - Summer (DST): UTC+3 (EEST)

Maidla is a village in Rapla Parish, Rapla County in northwestern Estonia. Between 1991 and 2017 (until the administrative reform of Estonian municipalities) the village was located in Juuru Parish.

== Maidla manor ==
Maidla (German: Maidel) manor has a history that goes back to at least 1452. During the Middle Ages, there was a fortified manor or a small castle on the site, parts of which has been incorporated into the eastern tower of the current, later building. The current building dates from the second half of the 18th century, while it received its current look during a reconstruction in the early part of the 19th century. The interior is characterised by its 19th-century decoration such as a well-preserved neo-renaissance coffered ceiling.

The estate has belonged to several local Baltic German aristocratic families throughout its history, notably the Taube, von Fersen and von Maydell families. After the land reform of 1919, the manor was given by the Estonian state to Richard Gustav Borgelin the commander of the Danish volunteers in the Estonian War of Independence, as a reward for his services to the country. Since the 1950s, it has been an orphanage.

Apart from the main manor house, the former estate incorporates several still surviving outbuildings, such as stables and servants' quarters. An artificial lake forms a backdrop to the building at the rear.

== See also ==
- List of palaces and manor houses in Estonia
