= Mahtra Nature Reserve =

Protected area in Estonia

- Location within Estonia
- Location: Estonia
- Nearest city: Juuru
- Coordinates: 59°08′N 25°00′E
- Area: 7,610 ha (18,800 acres)
- Established: 1959

Mahtra Nature Reserve is a nature reserve which is located in Harju County, Estonia.

The area of the nature reserve is 7610 ha.

The protected area was founded in 1959 to protect Järlepa Manor Park with the lake. In 1964 also Amassaare Hill was taken under protection.
