= Atla, Rapla County =

Village in Estonia

Atla
- Village
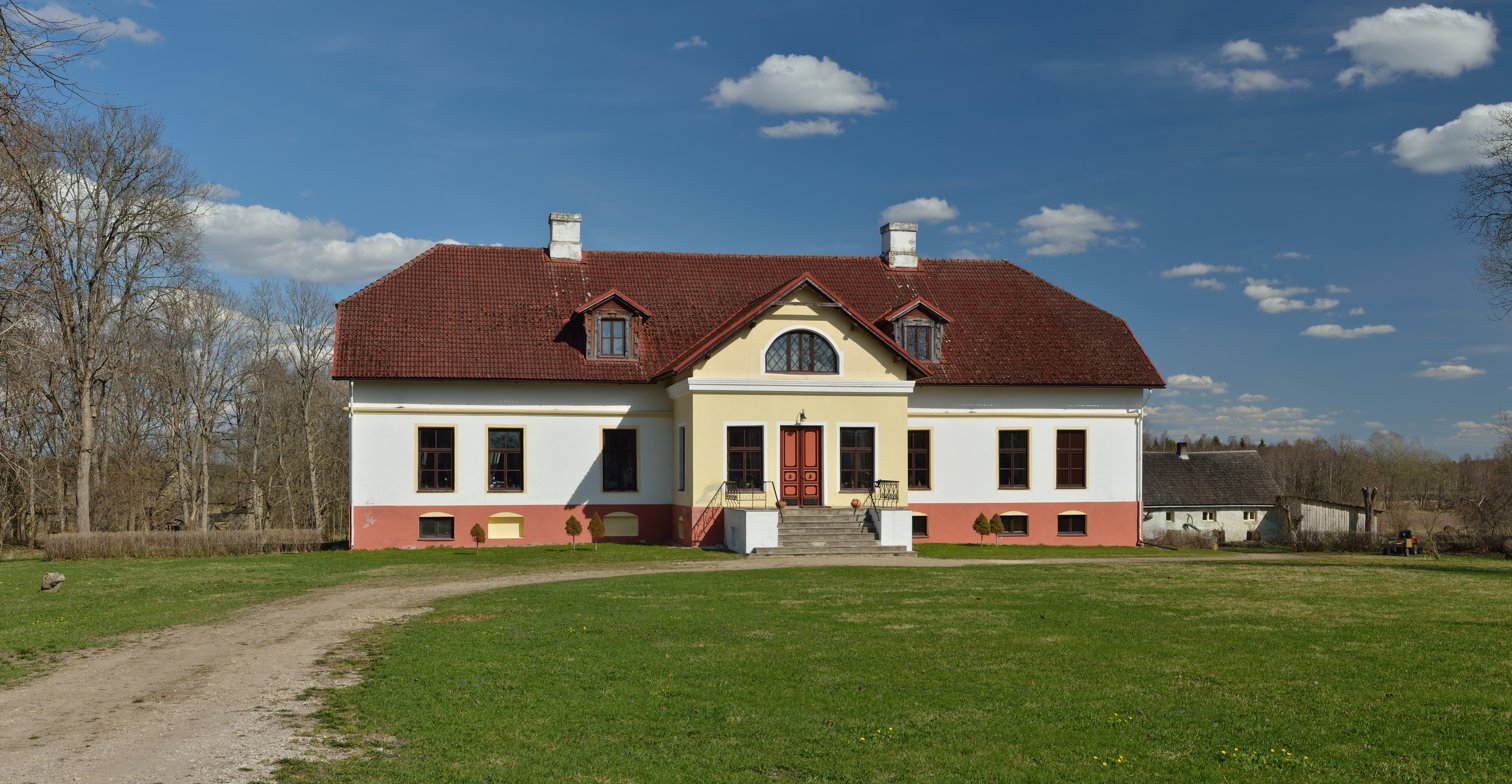
- Atla manor main building

- Location in Estonia
- Coordinates: 59°03′13″N 25°00′27″E
- Country: Estonia
- County: Rapla County
- Municipality: Rapla Parish
- First mentioned: 1422

Population (2011 Census)
  - Total: 81

Atla (German: Attel) is a village in Rapla Parish, Rapla County, Estonia. It is located about 13 km (8 mi) northeast of the town of Rapla, just east of Juuru and 6 km (4 mi) northwest of Kaiu, by road no. 14 (the road from Kose to Purila). As of the 2011 census, the village's population was 81. Between 1991 and 2017 (until the administrative reform of Estonian municipalities), the village was located in Juuru Parish.

Atla Manor was first mentioned as Groß-Attel in 1422, when it belonged to Hannes van Treyden. In the 16th and 17th centuries, the manor belonged to the Dücker family. After the Great Northern War, it was owned by the Maydells and the Helffreichs. From 1873 to its dispossession in 1919, the Barlöwens lived there. Nowadays a private pottery workshop is located in the manor.
