= Juuru Parish =

Former municipality of Estonia

Coordinates: 59°3′52″N 24°57′1″E

Juuru Parish Juuru vald
- Former municipality of Estonia
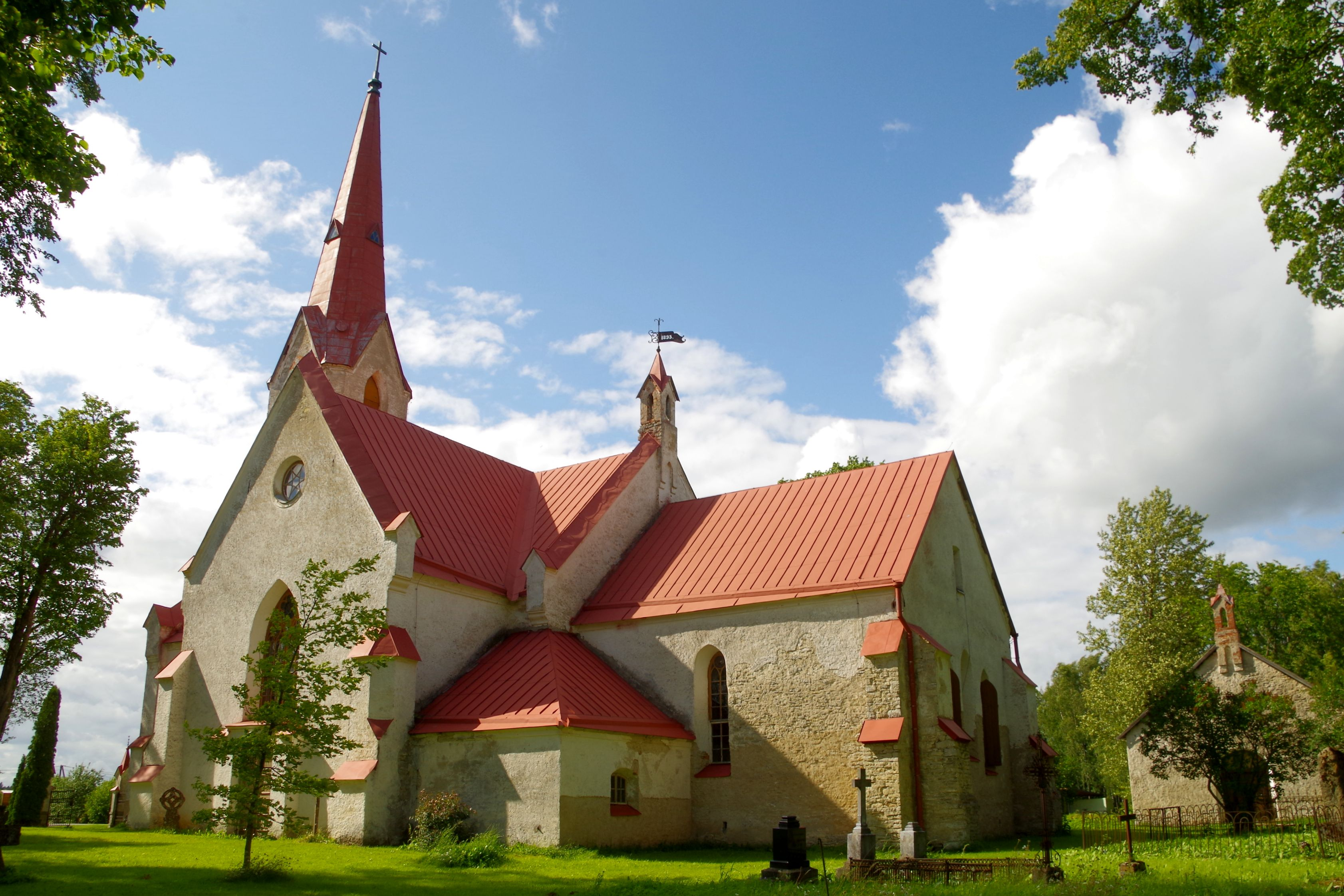
- Juuru church

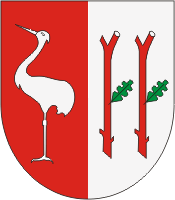
- Flag Coat of arms

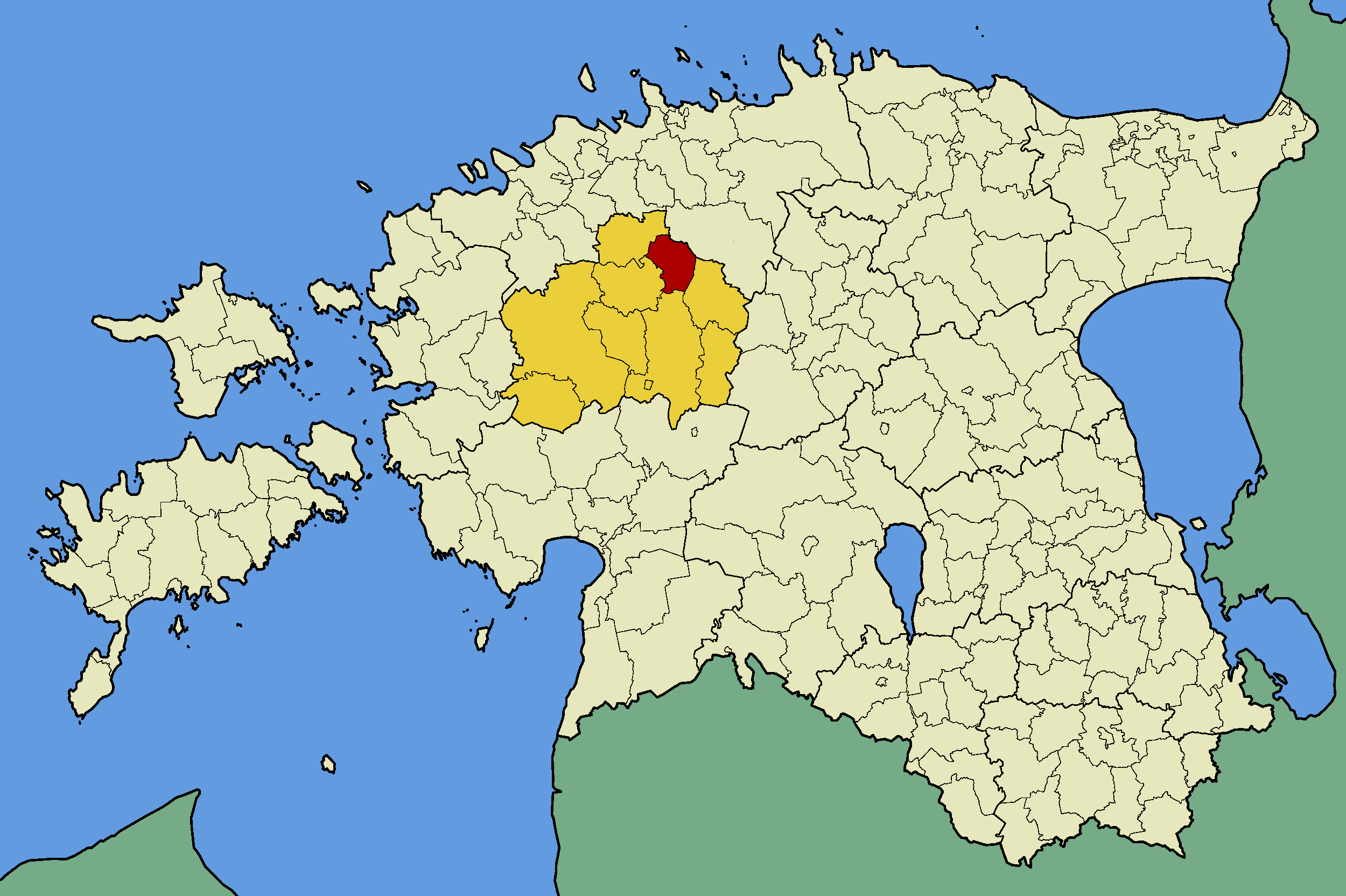
- Juuru Parish within Rapla County
- Country: Estonia
- County: Rapla County
- Administrative centre: Juuru

Area
  - Total: 152.4 km^{2} (58.8 sq mi)

Population (31.03.2006)
  - Total: 1,627
  - Density: 10.68/km^{2} (27.65/sq mi)
- Website: www.juuru.ee

Juuru Parish (Estonian: Juuru vald) is a former Estonian municipality located in Rapla County. It had a population of 1,627 (as of 31 March 2006) and an area of 152.4 km².

In 2017, Juuru Parish was merged into Rapla Parish.

== Settlements ==
Juuru Parish has one small borough (Juuru, with 597 inhabitants) and 14 villages: Atla, Härgla, Helda, Hõreda, Jaluse, Järlepa, Kalda, Lõiuse, Mahtra, Maidla, Orguse, Pirgu, Sadala, and Vankse.

== Gallery ==
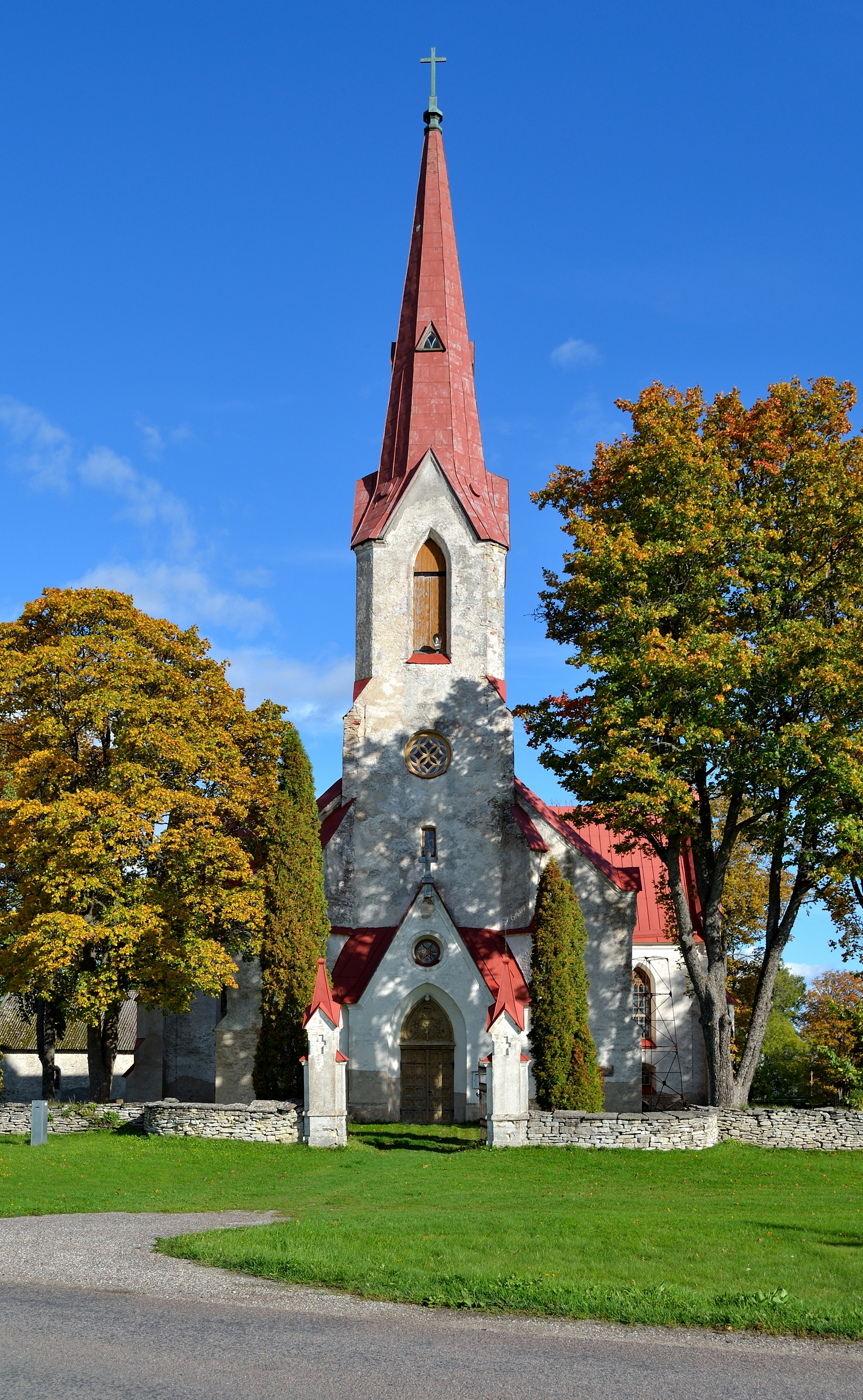
Juuru Church

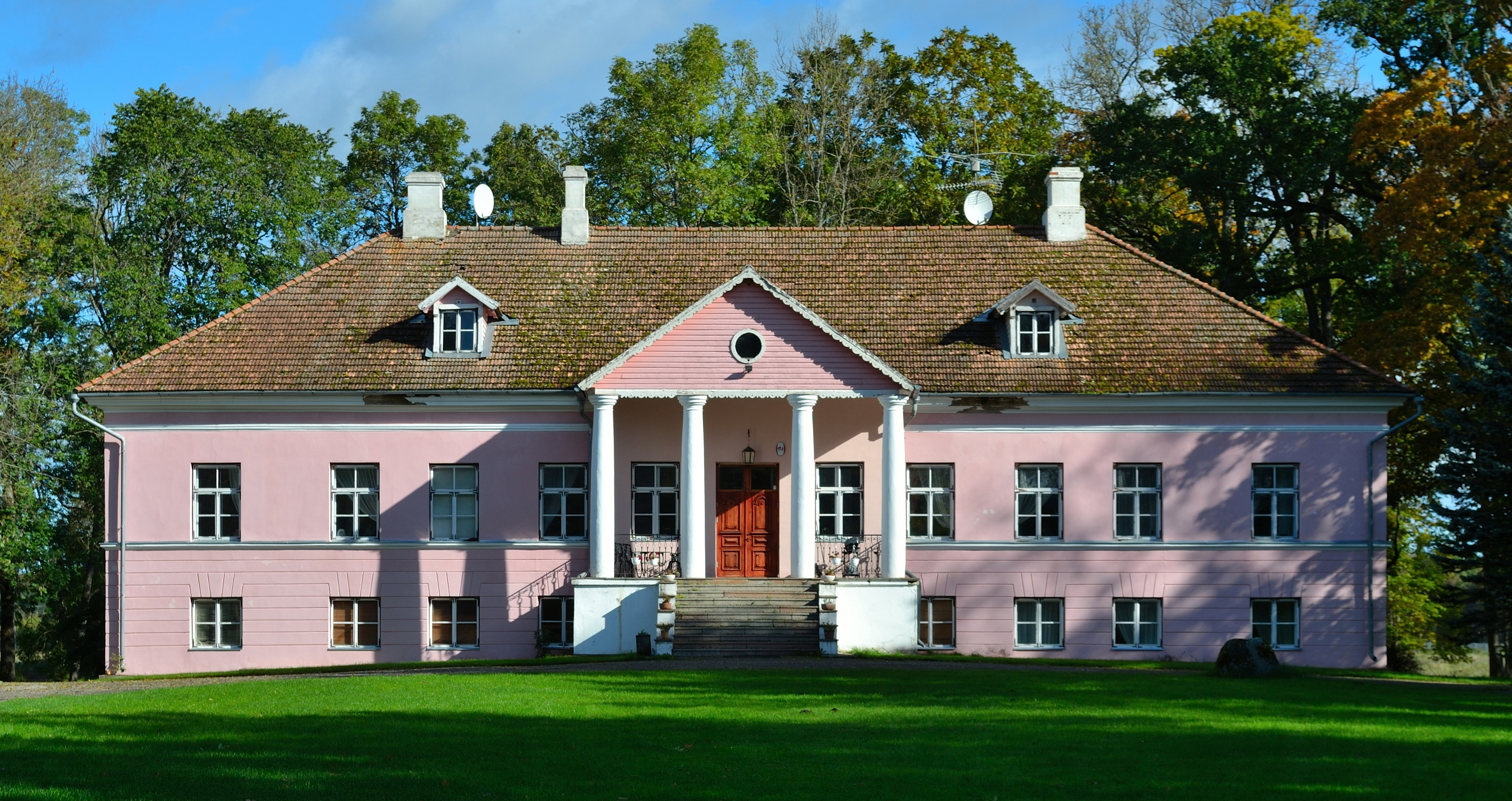
Järlepa Manor

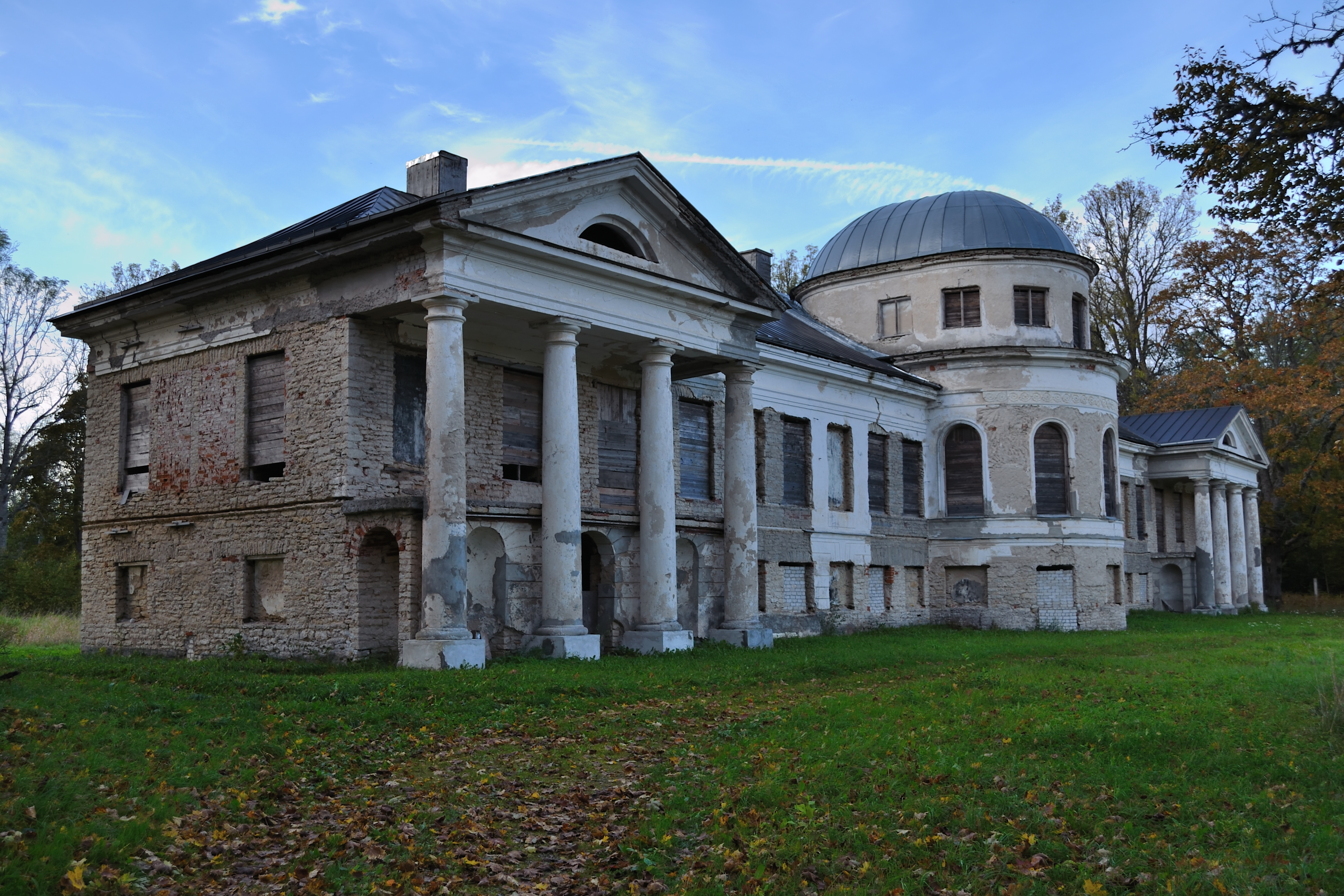
Hõreda Manor

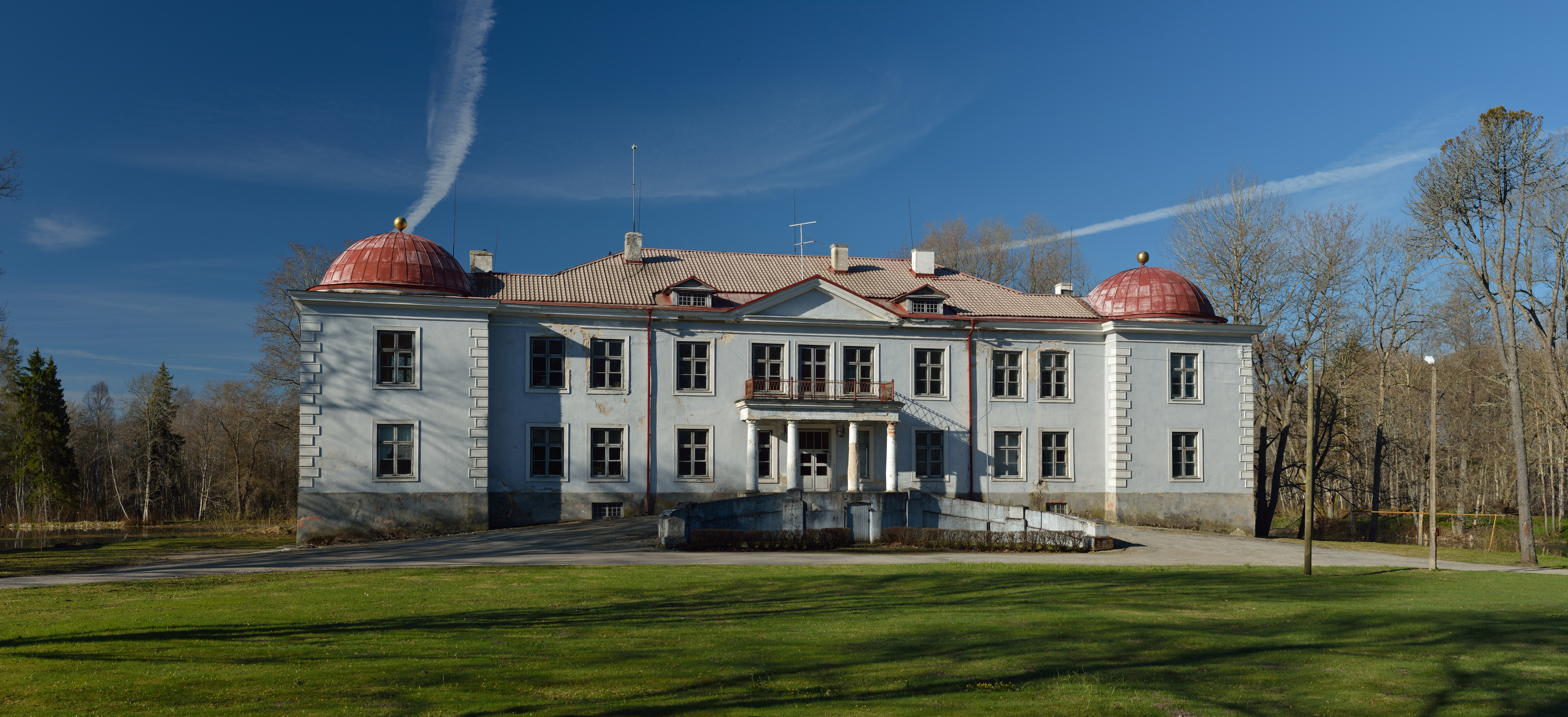
Maidla Manor

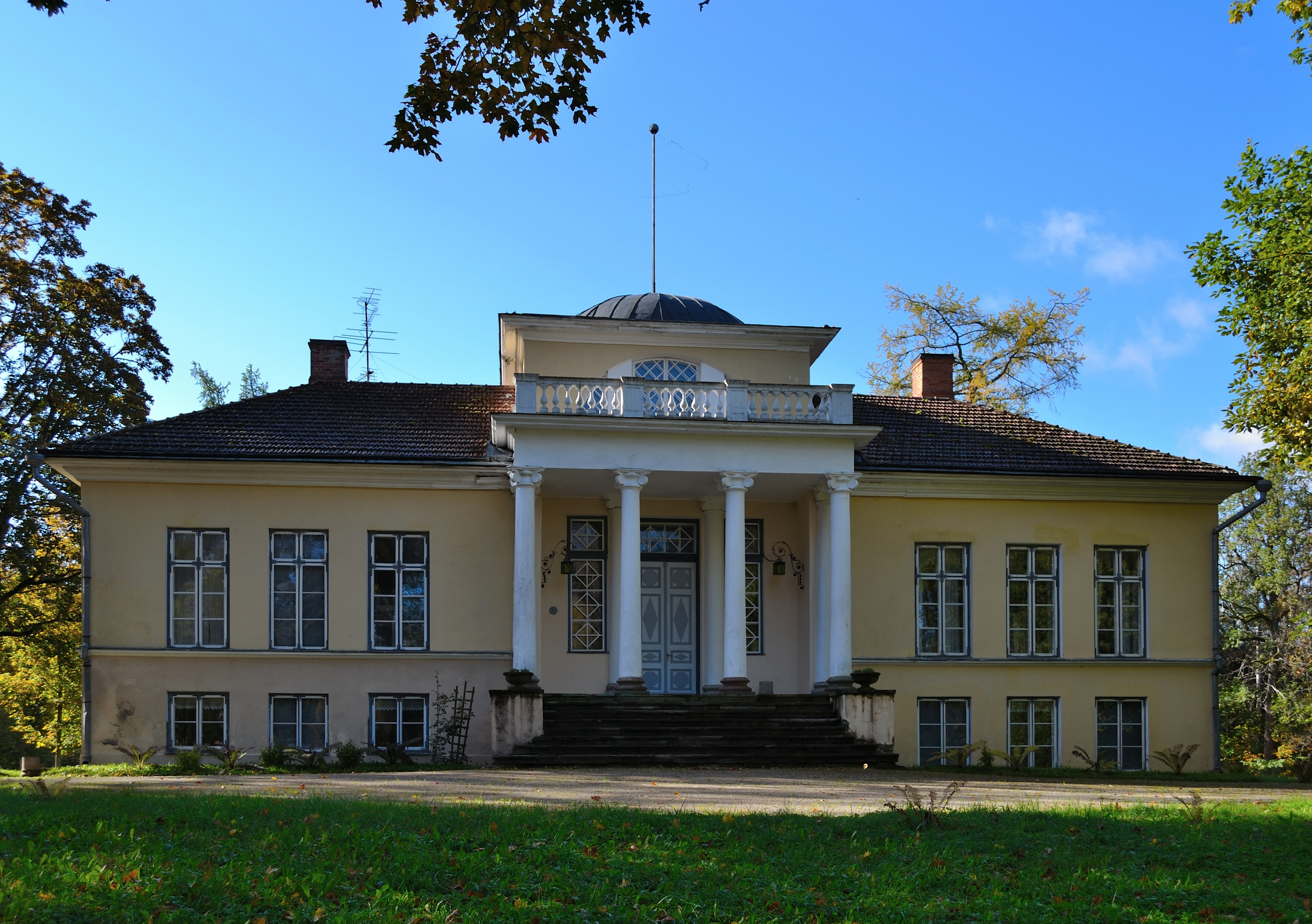
Pirgu Manor

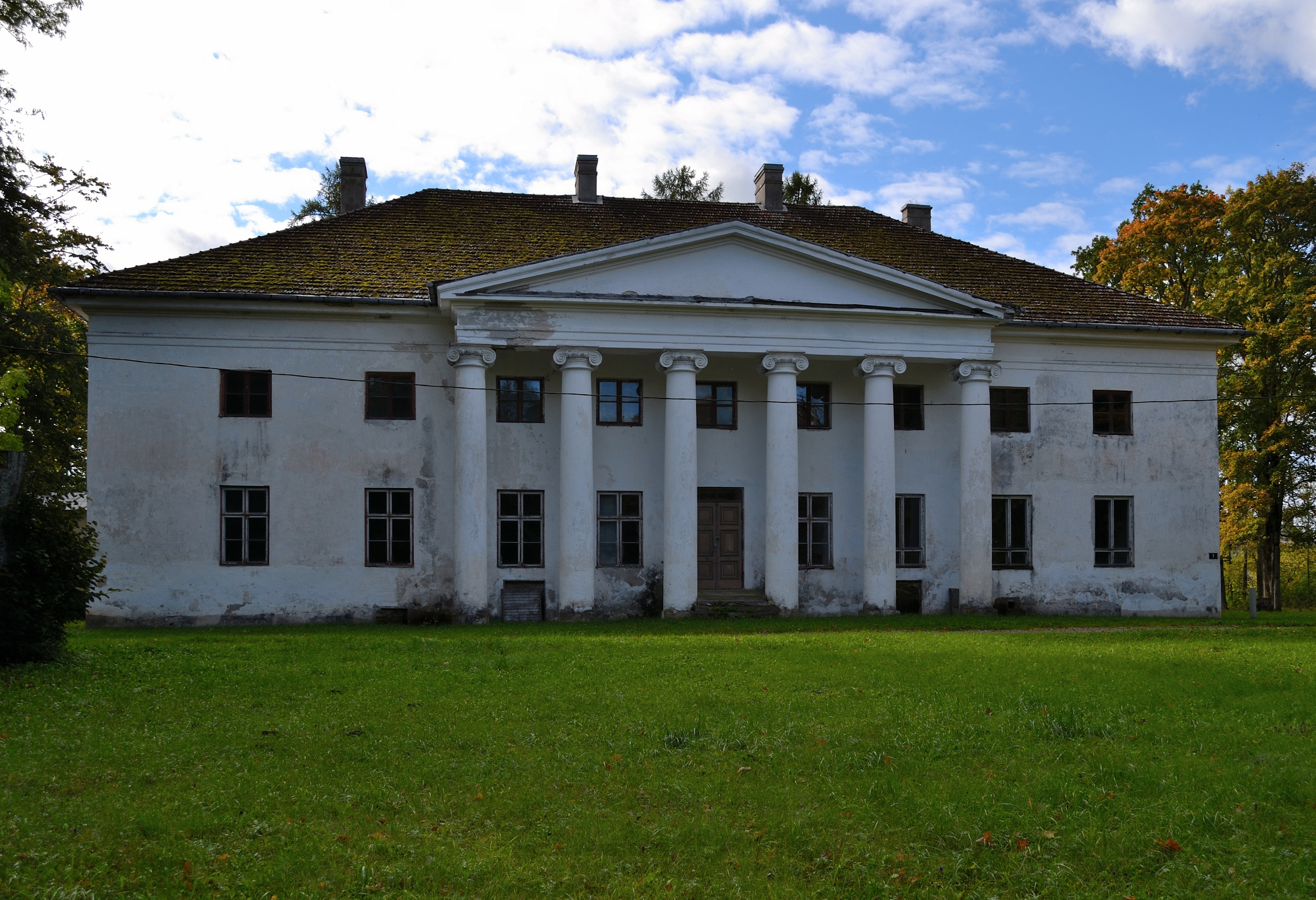
Härgla Manor

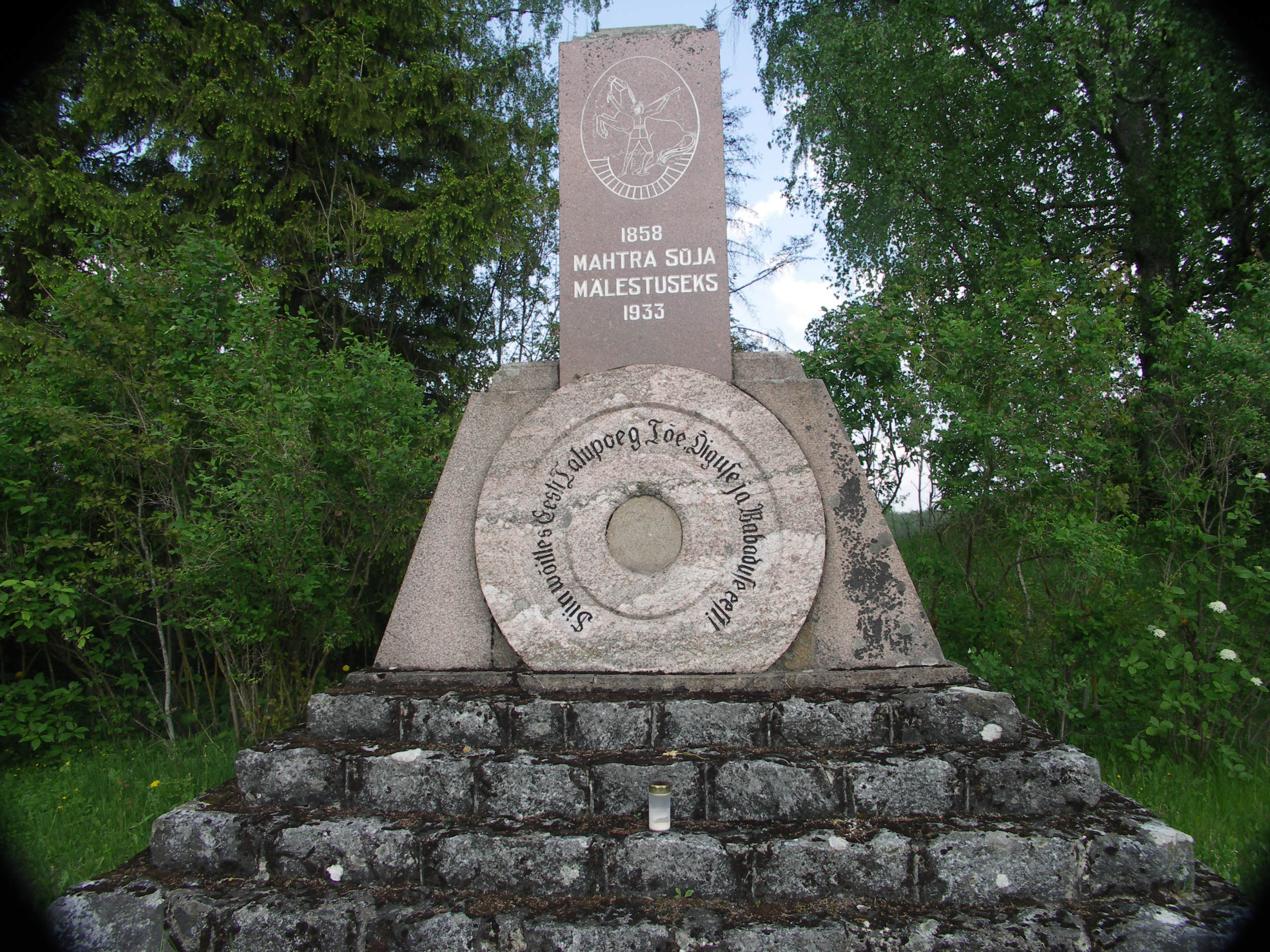
Monument to those fallen in the Mahtra War
