= Musta mantliga mees =

Book by Eduard Vilde

- Author: Eduard Vilde
- Language: Estonian
- Publisher: K. Busch
- Publication date: 1886
- Publication place: Estonia
- Media type: Print

Musta mantliga mees (The Man in the Black Coat) is a novel written by Eduard Vilde in 1883 and published in 1886. It deals with social criticism. The story begins with the sentence: "A heavy hand was placed on his shoulder, a low voice said, 'You are a murderer!'"

== Characters ==
- Dr. Anton Meding: the Man in the Black Coat
- Count Edvin Palmer: the owner of Elvita Manor
- Countess Dorothea Palmer: the wife of Edwin Palmer, mother of Laura and Armand
- Lady Laura Palmer: Edvin Palmer's 19-year-old daughter
- Armand Palmer: the Palmers' sickly 10-year-old son
- Leib Jochel: the Jewish usurer that lusts after Count Palmer's daughter Laura, whom he wishes to marry
- Albert Palmer: the previous owner of Elvita Manor, older brother of Edvin Palmer, who bequeaths Elvita Manor to Edvin
- Baron Hugo von Lammerheim: the new owner of the neighboring estate of the Palmers
