= Sirje Endre =

Estonian journalist, politician, and entrepreneur

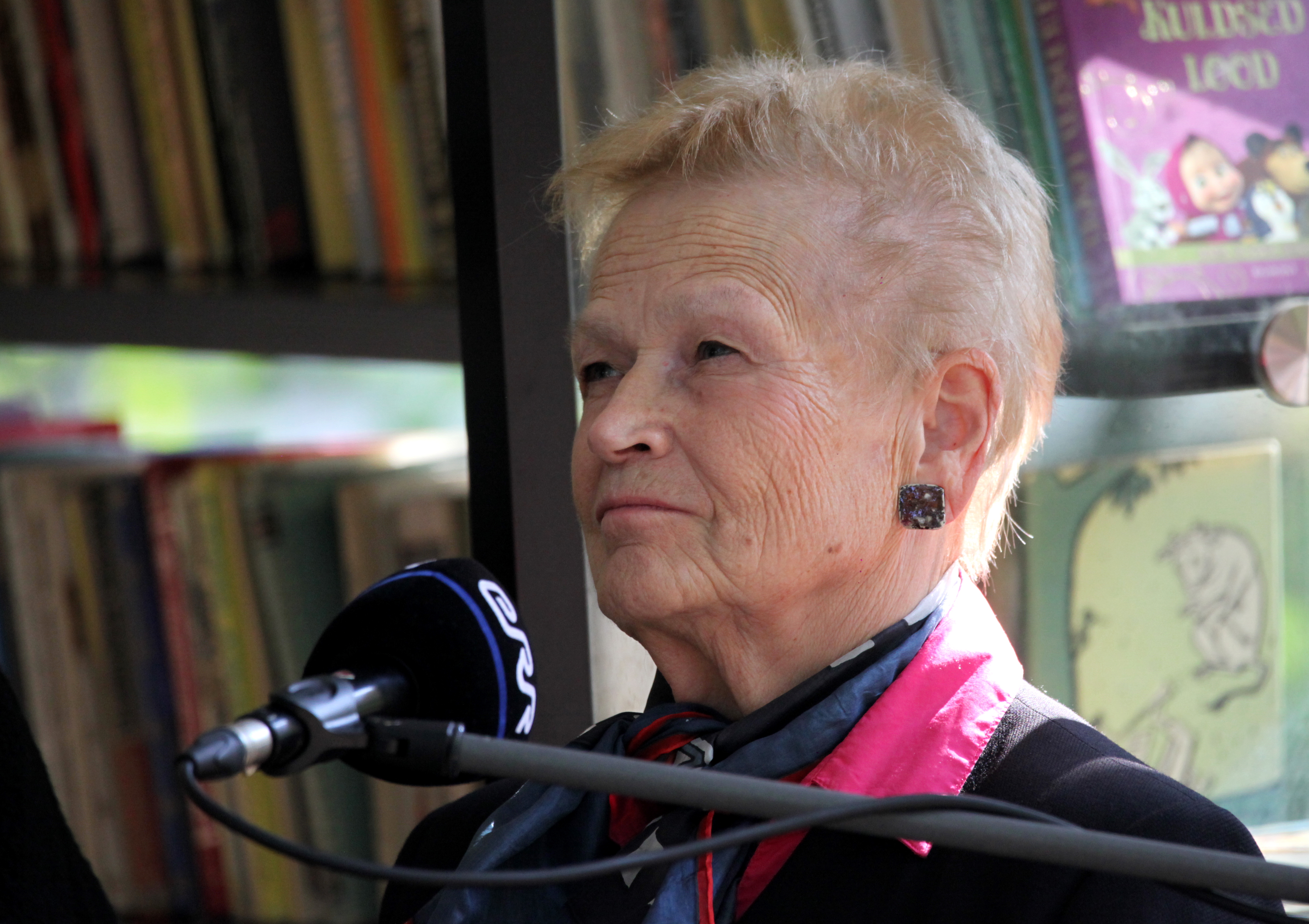
Sirje Endre at the annual Literary Street festival 2021 in Tallinn, Estonia

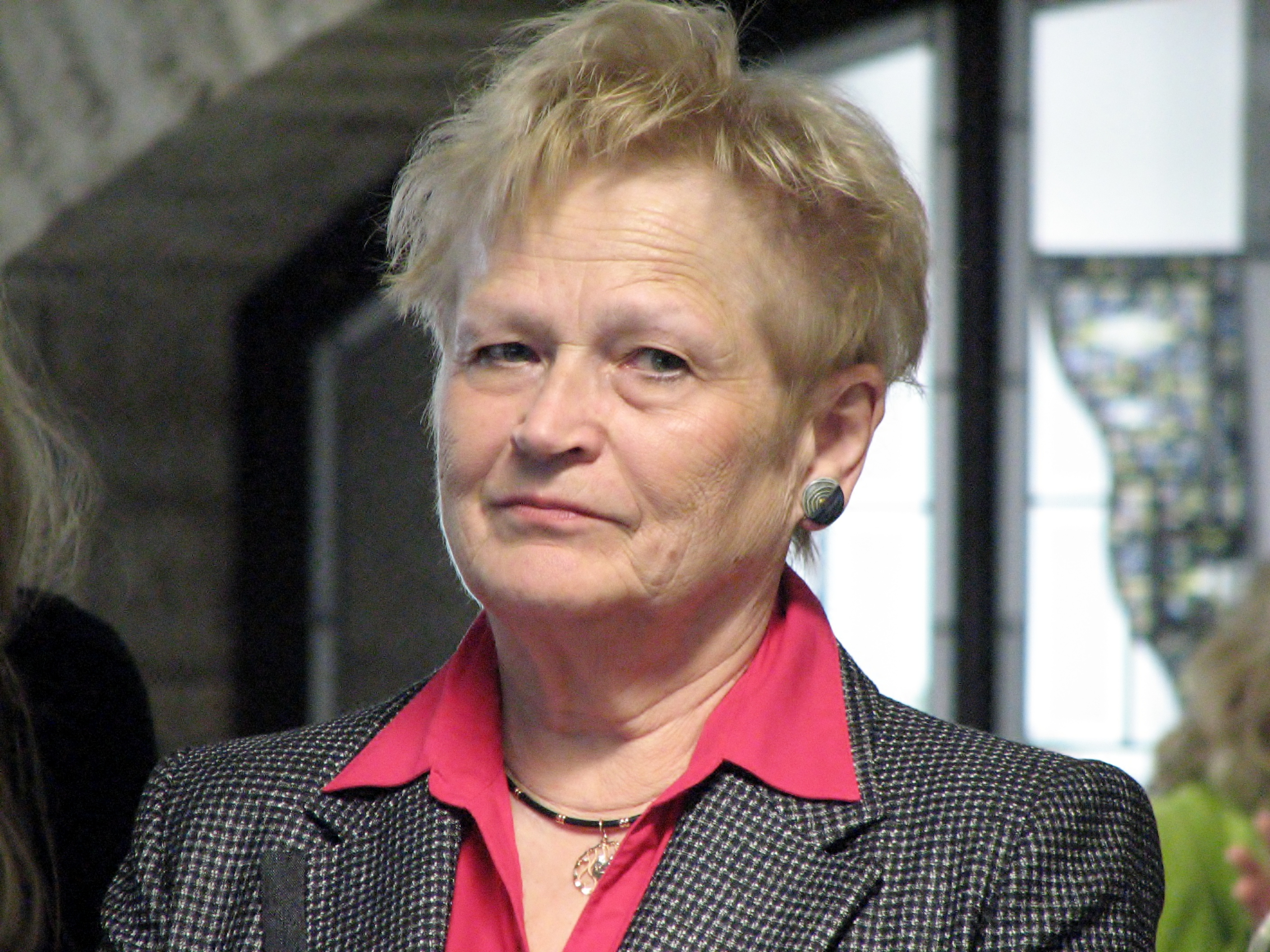
Sirje Endre

Sirje Endre (born 22 February 1945 in Juuru) is an Estonian journalist, politician and entrepreneur. She was a member of IX Riigikogu.

She has been a member of Pro Patria Union. She is a member of Isamaa and Res Publica Union. In the years 1968–1990, he was a member of the CPSU and was the first secretary of the ELKNÜ TRÜ Committee (during the Komsomol position).
