= Sadala, Rapla County =

Village in Estonia

Sadala
- Village
- Location in Estonia
- Coordinates: 59°07′00″N 24°53′51″E
- Country: Estonia
- County: Rapla County
- Municipality: Rapla Parish
- Official village: 2010

Area
  - Total: 3.85 km^{2} (1.49 sq mi)

Population (01.02.2010)
  - Total: 10
  - Density: 2.6/km^{2} (6.7/sq mi)

Sadala is a village in Rapla Parish, Rapla County, Estonia. It has an area of 385 hectares and a population of 10 (as of 1 February 2010). Between 1991 and 2017 (until the administrative reform of Estonian municipalities) the village was located in Juuru Parish.

Sadala village was detached from Lõiuse and Järlepa villages in 2010.
