= Hõreda =

Village in Estonia

- Village
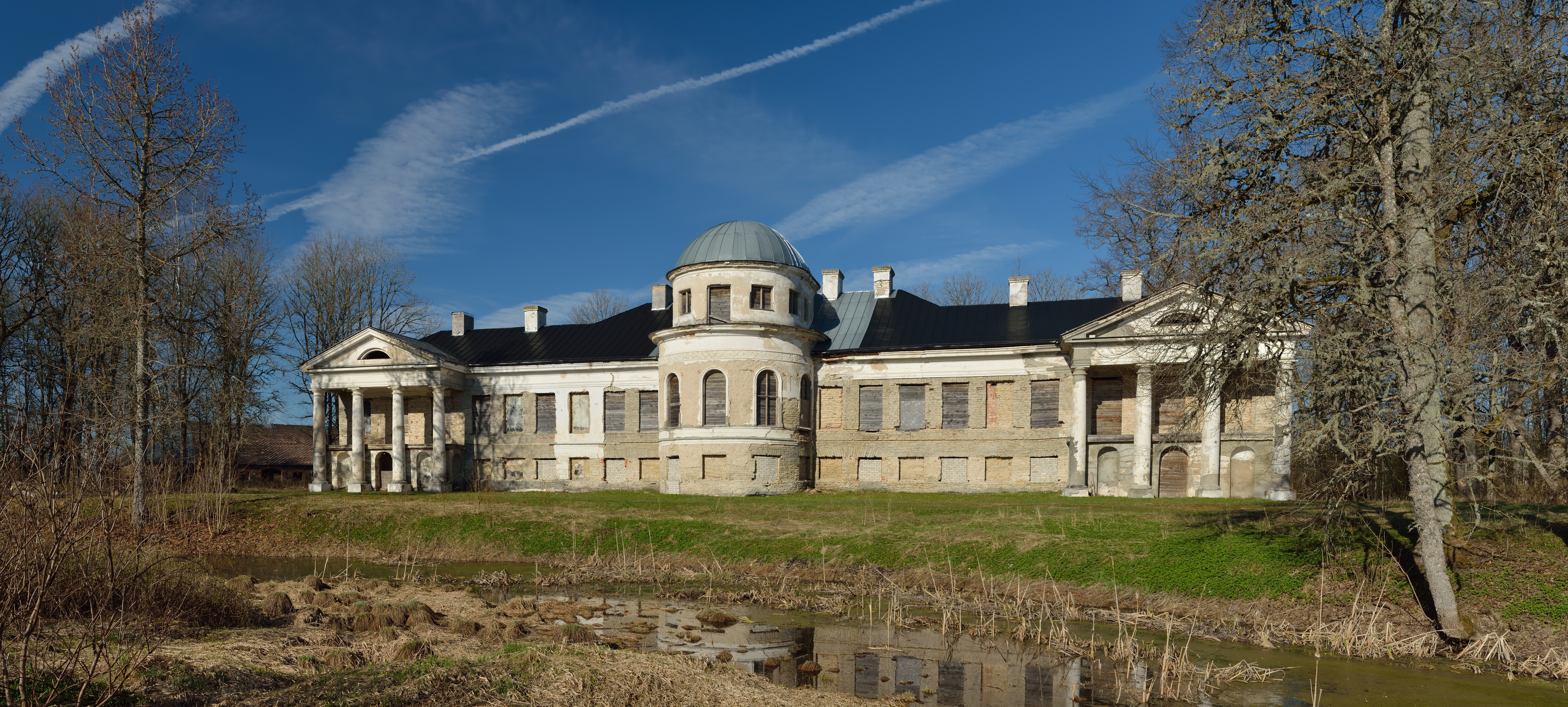
- Hõreda Manor

- Location in Estonia
- Coordinates: 59°01′19″N 24°55′11″E
- Country: Estonia
- County: Rapla County
- Municipality: Rapla Parish

Area
  - Total: 4.21 km^{2} (1.63 sq mi)

Population (01.02.2010)
  - Total: 39
  - Density: 9.3/km^{2} (24/sq mi)

Hõreda (German: Hördel) is a village in Rapla Parish, Rapla County in northwestern Estonia. It has an area of 421 ha and a population of 39 (as of 1 February 2010).

Between 1991–2017 (until the administrative reform of Estonian municipalities) the village was located in Juuru Parish. In 2010 Helda village was detached from the lands of Hõreda.

Actor Jaan Rekkor was born and raised in Hõreda.
