= Orguse, Rapla County =

Village in Estonia

Coordinates: 59°02′13″N 24°57′11″E

Orguse
- Village
- Interactive map of Orguse
- Country: Estonia
- County: Rapla County
- Parish: Rapla Parish
- Time zone: UTC+2 (EET)
  - Summer (DST): UTC+3 (EEST)

Orguse is a village in Rapla Parish, Rapla County in northwestern Estonia. Between 1991 and 2017 (until the administrative reform of Estonian municipalities) the village was located in Juuru Parish.
