= Kalda, Rapla County =

Village in Estonia

Kalda
- Village
- Location in Estonia
- Coordinates: 59°06′32″N 24°53′04″E
- Country: Estonia
- County: Rapla County
- Municipality: Rapla Parish
- Official village: 2010

Area
  - Total: 0.53 km^{2} (0.20 sq mi)

Population (01.02.2010)
  - Total: 10
  - Density: 19/km^{2} (49/sq mi)

Kalda is a village in Rapla Parish, Rapla County, Estonia. It has an area of 53 ha (130 acres) and a population of 10 (as of 1 February 2010).

Between 1991 and 2017 (until the administrative reform of Estonian municipalities) the village was located in Juuru Parish. Kalda village was detached from Härgla in 2010.
