= Mahtra Peasant Museum =

Museum in Estonia

- Mahtra Talurahvamuuseum
- Established: 1970
- Location: Muuseumi 1, Juuru, Rapla Parish, 79401 Rapla County, Estonia
- Coordinates: 59°3′26″N 24°57′56″E
- Type: Rural history museum
- Director: Jaanus Plaat
- Website: mahtramuuseum.ee

The Mahtra Peasant Museum (Estonian: Mahtra Talurahvamuuseum) is located in Rapla Parish in Rapla County, Estonia. It is a national institution of the Estonian Ministry of Culture and a national museum.

In its charter, the main objectives of the museum are as follows: "to collect, study, and preserve information and objects of cultural value relating to the history and culture of Rapla County, and to make it available to the public for the purposes of research, education, and general interest."

The museum has its origins in an exhibition on the 90th anniversary of the Mahtra War that was held in Juuru Middle School (Estonian: Juuru Mittieelikus Keskskool). In 1958, on the centennial of the Mahtra War, a museum room was opened in the Juuru Cultural Center. The museum was founded in 1967 and was officially opened in 1970.
