= Lõiuse =

Village in Estonia

- Village
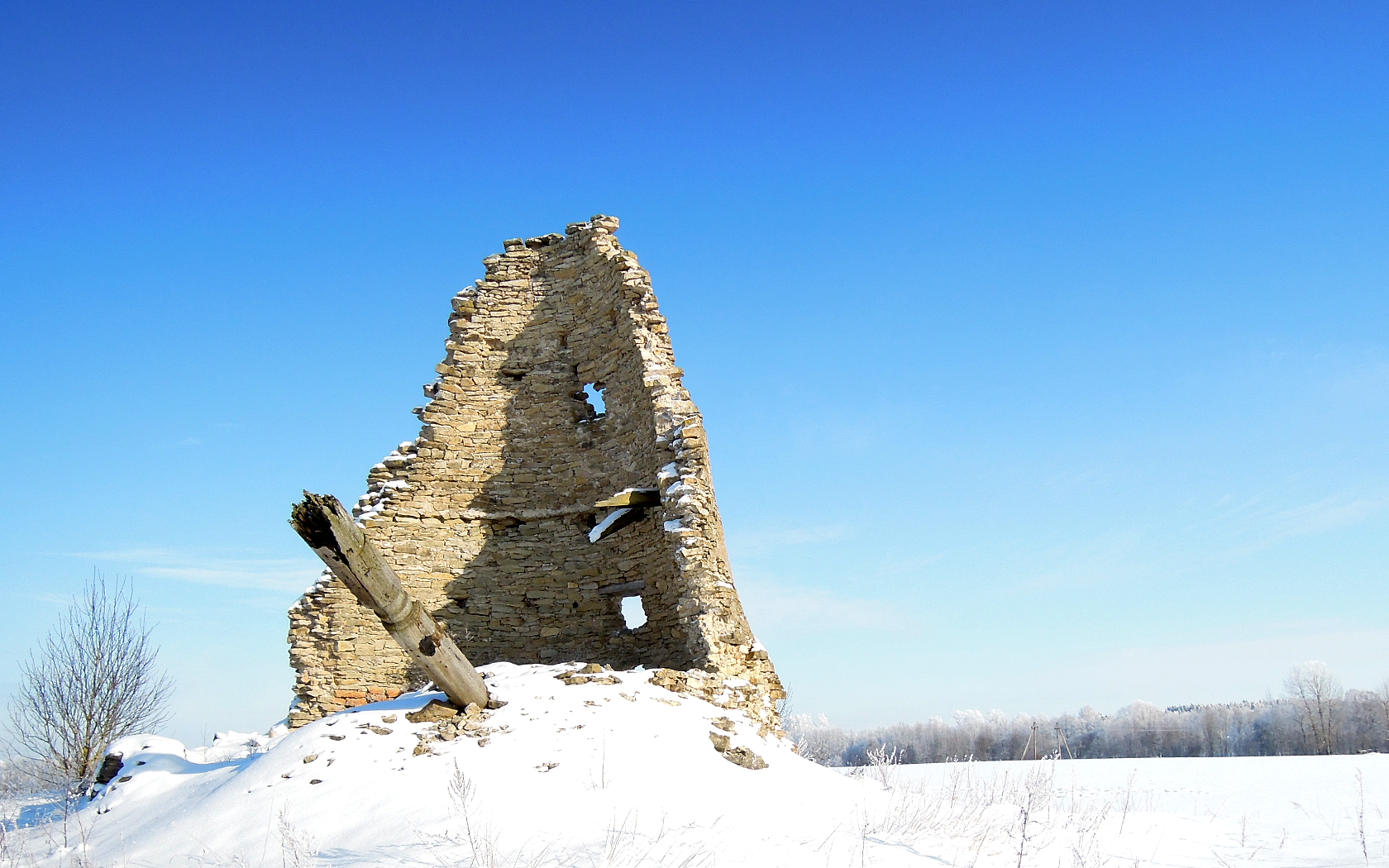
- Ruins of Lõiuse windmill.

- Location in Estonia
- Coordinates: 59°07′14″N 24°52′50″E
- Country: Estonia
- County: Rapla County
- Municipality: Rapla Parish
- First mentioned: 1241

Area
  - Total: 13.48 km^{2} (5.20 sq mi)

Population (01.02.2010)
  - Total: 108
  - Density: 8.01/km^{2} (20.8/sq mi)

Lõiuse is a village in Rapla Parish, Rapla County in northwestern Estonia. It has an area of 13.48 km² and a population of 108 (as of 1 February 2010).

Lõiuse was first mentioned in 1241 as Leus village in the Danish Census Book.

Between 1991–2017 (until the administrative reform of Estonian municipalities) the village was located in Juuru Parish. In 2010 Sadala village was detached from the lands of Lõiuse and Järlepa villages.
