= Richard Gustav Borgelin =

Danish military officer

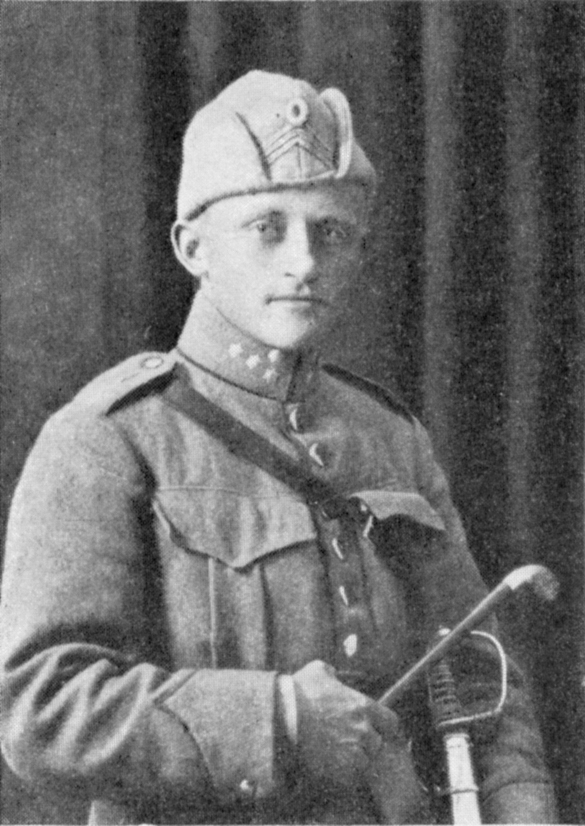
- Richard Gustav Borgelin
- Born: 10 February 1887; Herning, Denmark
- Died: 8 December 1966 (aged 79); Copenhagen, Denmark
- Burial place: Kalvehave, Denmark; 54°59′53.14″N 12°8′37.51″E
- Military career
- Allegiance: Denmark; Estonia
- Rank: Captain; Kolonelleitnant (1919)
- Units: Danish-Baltic Auxiliary Corps (1919); White Russian Northwest Army (1919); Estonian Army (1919–1922)
- Conflicts: Estonian War of Independence; Latvian War of Independence; Russian Civil War
- Awards: Cross of Liberty I/2 and II/3 (1920); Cross of the Eagle 3rd Class with Swords (1930); Order of Lāčplēsis 3rd Class (1922) Order of St. Vladimir 4th Class with Swords (Northwest Army); Order of St. Anna 2nd Class with Swords (Northwest Army)

Captain Richard Gustav Borgelin (10 February 1887 – 8 December 1966) was a Danish officer and company commander of the Danish-Baltic Auxiliary Corps (DBAC) in 1919 during the Estonian and Latvian War of Independence.

Borgelin attended and successfully ended his education at the Royal Danish Military Academy in 1909. In 1919, when Borgelin was officer of the reserve and in charge of the Second Regiment Corporal School at the Værløse Camp in northern Zealand, he was given the offer of becoming company commander of a combat unit consisting of 200 men. In the spring of 1919, Borgelin and his Compagnie Borgelin arrived in Estonia with 12 Danish officers, 12 Danish junior officers and 189 Danish privates. The company participated in the Estonian and Latvian War of Independence under Estonian army command until 1 September 1919, when the contract expired and the company was disbanded.

Borgelin and seven other Danes were awarded the Latvian military Order of Lāčplēsis of third class. In gratitude for his services to the Estonian state, Borgelin was granted Maidla manor in Estonia.

During World War II, Borgelin enlisted as an Abwehr agent for Germany after the occupation of Denmark. After the war, he was sentenced to 18 months in prison for collaboration.

== Awards and decorations ==
Cross of Liberty (I/2 and II/3 class)
Order of the Cross of the Eagle (3rd Class with Swords)
Order of Lāčplēsis (3rd class)
Order of St. Vladimir (4th class)
Order of St. Anna (2nd class with Swords)
