= Helda =

Village in Estonia

- Village
- Location in Estonia
- Coordinates: 59°01′46″N 24°55′47″E
- Country: Estonia
- County: Rapla County
- Municipality: Rapla Parish
- Official village: 2010

Area
  - Total: 5.45 km^{2} (2.10 sq mi)

Population (01.02.2010)
  - Total: 43
  - Density: 7.9/km^{2} (20/sq mi)

Helda is a village in Rapla Parish, Rapla County, Estonia. It's located about 8 km northeast of the town of Rapla. It has an area of 545 ha and a population of 43 (as of 1 February 2010).

Between 1991–2017 (until the administrative reform of Estonian municipalities) the village was located in Juuru Parish. Helda village was detached from Hõreda village in 2010.
