= Järlepa =

Village in Estonia

- Village
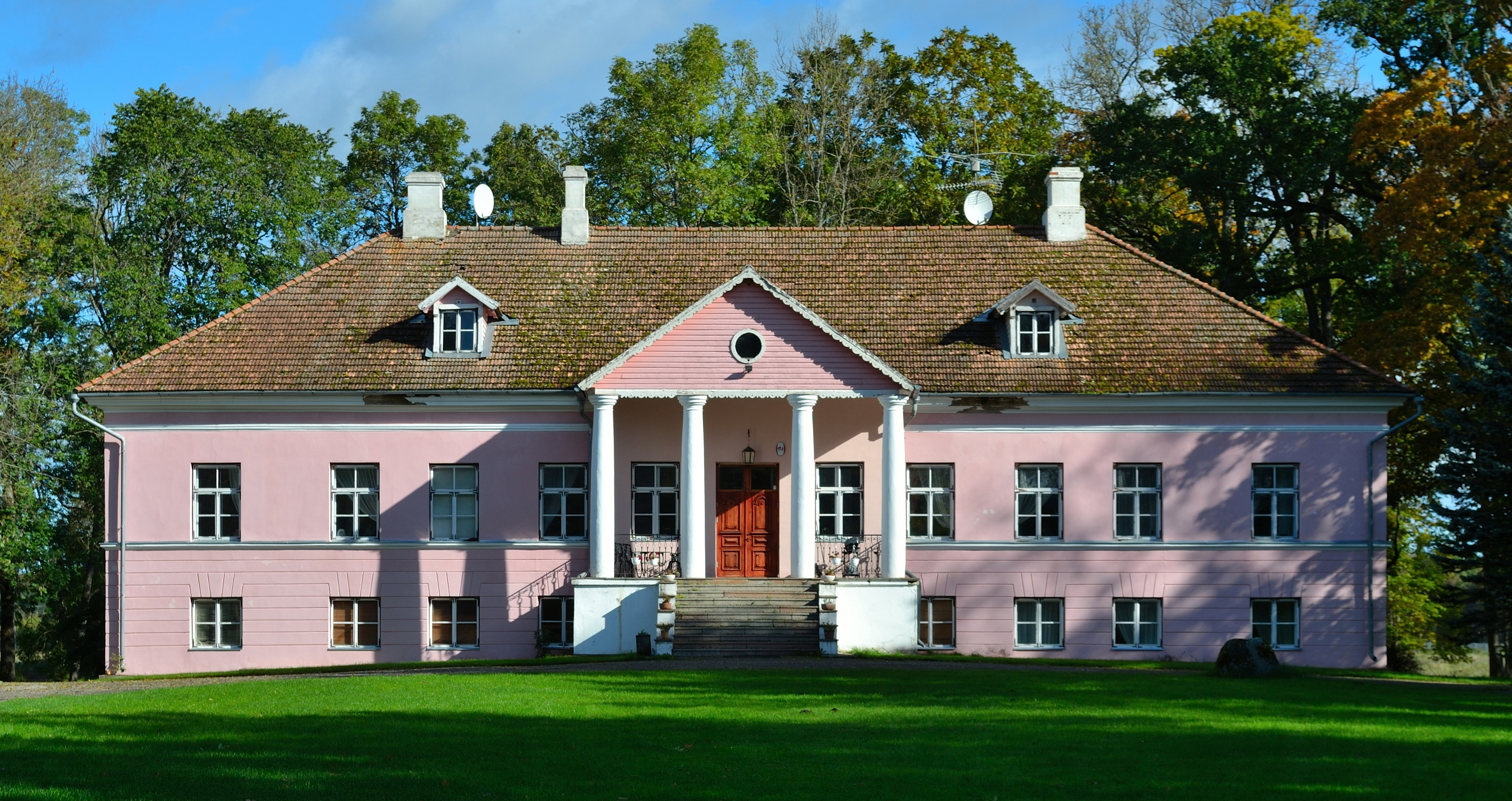
- Main building of Järlepa Manor

- Location in Estonia
- Coordinates: 59°08′11″N 24°55′38″E
- Country: Estonia
- County: Rapla County
- Municipality: Rapla Parish

Area
  - Total: 10.02 km^{2} (3.87 sq mi)

Population (1 February 2010)
  - Total: 206
  - Density: 20.6/km^{2} (53.2/sq mi)

Järlepa is a village in Rapla Parish, Rapla County, Estonia. It has an area of 10.02 km^{2} (3.87 sq mi) and a population of 206 (as of 1 February 2010).

Between 1991–2017 (until the administrative reform of Estonian municipalities) the village was located in Juuru Parish. In 2010 Sadala village was detached from the lands of Järlepa and Lõiuse villages.

== Järlepa manor ==
Järlepa (German: Jerlep) was founded after 1688. The present building was erected in 1804 in a classicist style. It was devastated during the uprising in 1905 but later restored. During the Soviet occupation of Estonia, the manor house was used as the office of a collective farm. The most famous resident of the manor was dramatist August von Kotzebue, who acquired the estate in 1804. During his time, a small theatre was put up at the estate, and Kotzebue's plays were often performed.

== See also ==
- Järlepa Lake
- List of palaces and manor houses in Estonia
