= Pirgu =

Village in Estonia

- Village
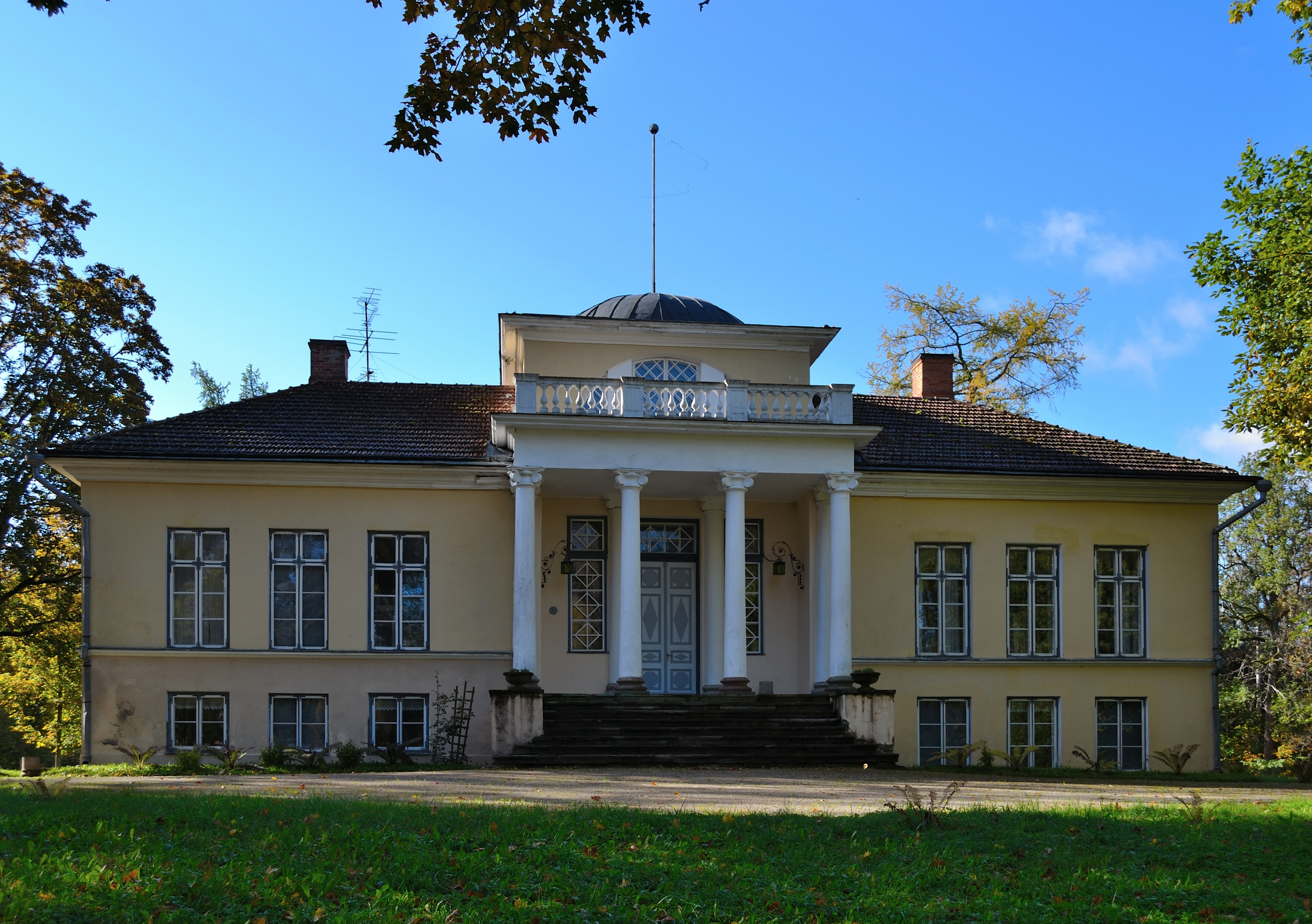
- Pirgu Manor

- Location in Estonia
- Coordinates: 59°07′00″N 24°50′00″E
- Country: Estonia
- County: Rapla County
- Parish: Rapla Parish
- Time zone: UTC+02:00 (EET)
  - Summer (DST): UTC+03:00 (EEST)

Pirgu is a village in Rapla Parish, Rapla County in northwestern Estonia. Between 1991–2017 (until the administrative reform of Estonian municipalities) the village was located in Juuru Parish.

== Pirgu manor ==
Pirgu (German: Pirk) estate was formed in 1662, when the lands were separated from Angerja castle estate. Subsequently, it has belonged to various Baltic German families. The last local aristocratic landowner was forced to leave the estate following the sweeping confiscations of land enacted during the Estonian land reform of 1919. Following this, the manor house fell into disrepair and by the 1980s was reduced to ruins. At the initiative of six local farms, restoration works were undertaken in 1987, and the manor house restored to its earlier appearance (which it originally received sometime after 1819). It is a classicist building, with a four-columned Ionic portico dominating the front façade.
