= Danish-Baltic Auxiliary Corps =

Danish military unit in Estonia (1919)

- Dansk-Baltisk Auxiliær Corps
- The insignia of Borgelin Company
- Active: 26 March 1919
- Disbanded: 1 September 1919
- Country: Denmark
- Allegiance: Estonia
- Type: Infantry
- Size: 213 volunteers
- Part of: 2nd Division
- Garrison/HQ: Tartu
- Nickname: Det Danske Frivillige Korps
- Colors: Gray and White
- March: "Björneborgarnas marsch"
- Mascot: Røv (Corps Dog)
- Engagements: Estonian war of independence Latvian War of Independence

Commanders
- Corps Commander: Iver de Hemmer Gudme
- Company Commander: Richard Gustav Borgelin

Insignia
- War flag

Danish-Baltic Auxiliary Corps (Danish: Dansk-Baltisk Auxiliær Corps, DBAC) was a Danish company of military volunteers, established 1919 as a non-governmental initiative to help in the Estonian and Latvian war of independence. It was originally planned to send several companies to help, but due to the success of war, only one company was sent, Compagnie Borgelin. The company consisted of approximately 200 men with Captain Iver de Hemmer Gudme as corps commander and Captain Richard Gustav Borgelin as company commander.

== History ==
DBAC left on th 26 March 1919 for Hanko in Finland on board the Finnish ship M/S Merkur.

DBAC was contracted by the Estonian Army and participated on its side in the months of May to August 1919 during the Estonian War of Independence and the Latvian War of Independence. During the months of May and June DBAC conducted a 200 kilometres (120 mi) long push from Võru in southern Estonia to Jēkabpils in Latvia, and ultimately the Daugava River, to cut off the Bolshevik's eastern supply lines.

After the successful campaign, the DBAC was pulled back to Estonia, since interfering political conflicts between Baltische Landeswehr and the Latvian Army was not part of the contract. At the end of July 1919 DBAC was sent to a section of the eastern front between Ostrov and Porkhov in the Russian Pskov Governorate, which turned out to be a bloody experience and costly to the corps (four dead, twenty wounded and four prisoners of war). On 2 September 1919, the Danish-Baltic Auxiliary Corps marched through Tallinn to their ship Kalevipoeg, in a victory parade with over 1000 Estonian soldiers, Johan Laidoner and Otto Strandman participating.

On 22 June 2013, a memorial for the Danish volunteers was revealed in Estonia.
