= Mahtra =

Village in Estonia

- Village
- Location in Estonia
- Coordinates: 59°05′16″N 25°00′52″E
- Country: Estonia
- County: Rapla County
- Municipality: Rapla Parish

Population (01.01.2010)
  - Total: 92

Mahtra (German: Machters) is a village in Rapla Parish, Rapla County, Estonia. It has a population of 92 (as of 1 January 2010). Between 1991 and 2017 (until the administrative reform of Estonian municipalities) the village was located in Juuru Parish.

In 1858 a peasant insurgency called the Mahtra War took place at the Mahtra Manor.
