= Härgla =

Village in Estonia

- Village
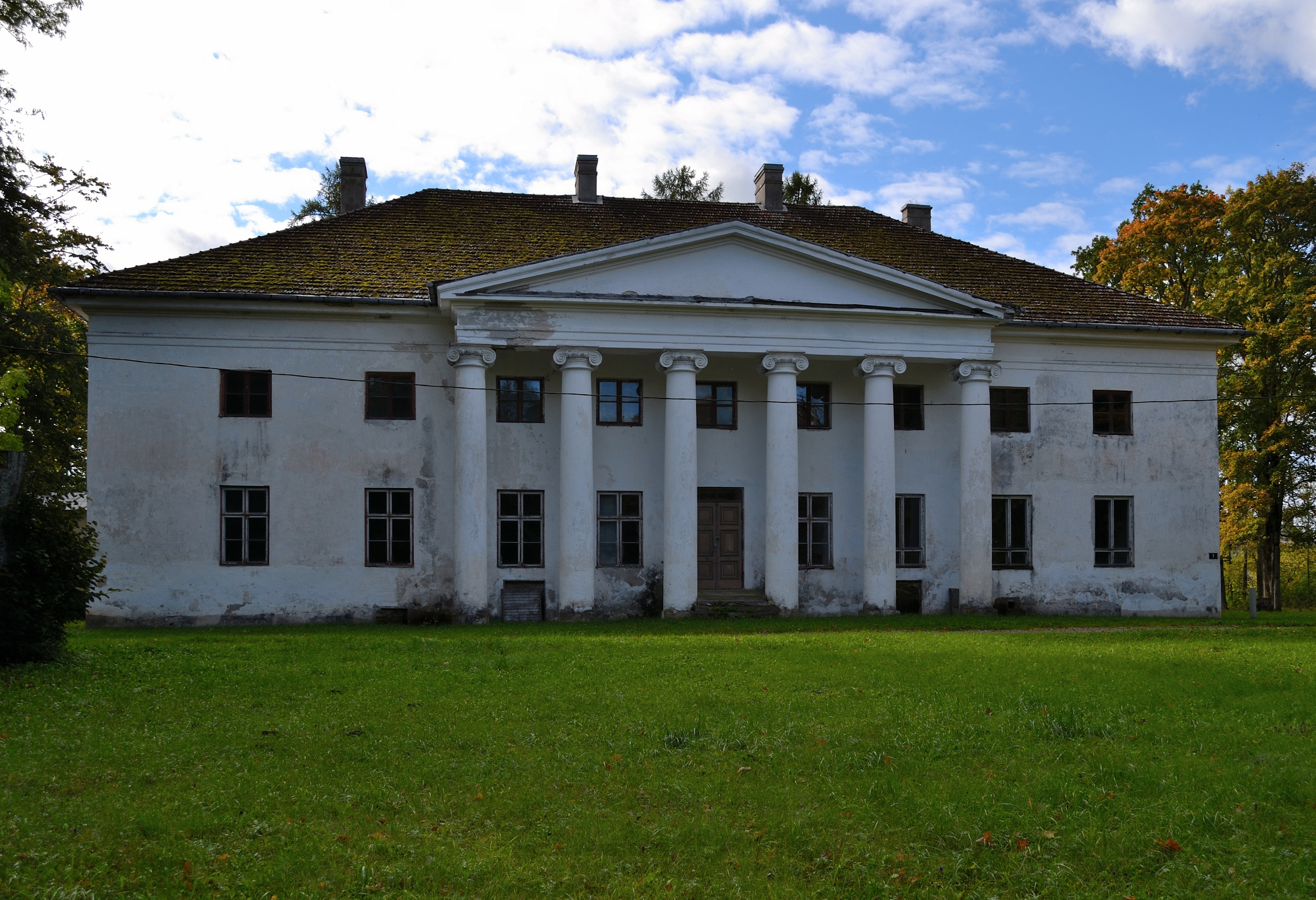
- Härgla manor main building

- Location in Estonia
- Coordinates: 59°06′01″N 24°54′36″E
- Country: Estonia
- County: Rapla County
- Municipality: Rapla Parish
- First mentioned: 1241

Area
  - Total: 12.35 km^{2} (4.77 sq mi)

Population (01.02.2010)
  - Total: 68
  - Density: 5.5/km^{2} (14/sq mi)

Härgla (also known as Härgküla) is a village in Rapla Parish, Rapla County, Estonia. It has an area of 12.35 km² and a population of 68 (as of 1 February 2010).

Between 1991–2017 (until the administrative reform of Estonian municipalities) the village was located in Juuru Parish. In 2010 Kalda village was detached from the lands of Härgla.

== Härgla manor ==
Härgla manor (German: Herkül) is mentioned in written sources for the first time in 1516. The current building originally dates from the 1780s but has been extensively rebuilt. The façade is dominated by the large ionic portico. Remaining interior details are mostly late 19th century.

== See also ==
- List of palaces and manor houses in Estonia
