= Eduard Vilde =

Estonian writer and politician

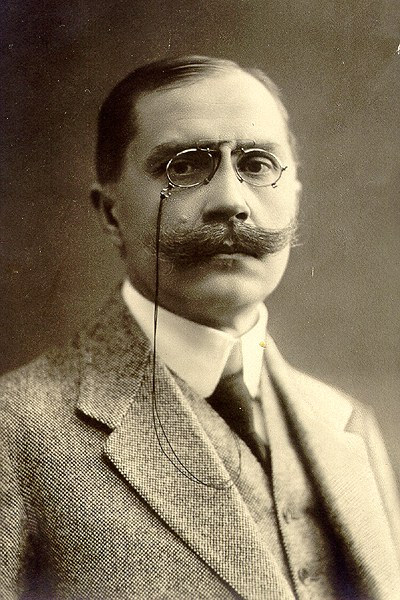
- Vilde in 1911
- Born: 4 March [O.S. 20 February] 1865; Poidifer, Kreis Wierland, Governorate of Estonia, Russian Empire (present-day Pudivere, Väike-Maarja Parish, Lääne-Viru County)
- Died: 26 December 1933 (aged 68); Tallinn, Estonia
- Occupation: Writer
- Writing career
- Period: 1880–1933

Signature
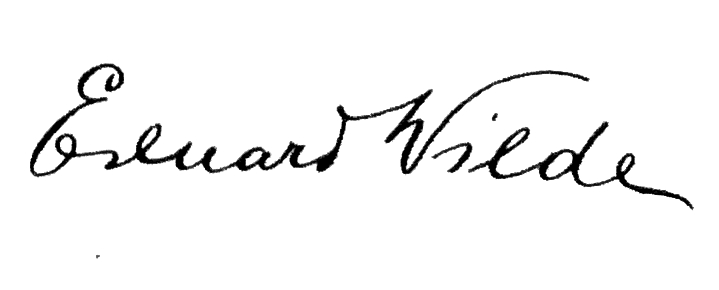

Eduard Vilde (4 March [O.S. 20 February] 1865 – 26 December 1933) was an Estonian writer, a pioneer of critical realism in Estonian literature, and a diplomat. He was the author of classics such as The War in Mahtra and The Milkman from Mäeküla. He was one of the most revered figures in Estonian literature and is generally credited as being the country's first professional writer.

== Life and career ==
Vilde grew up on the farm where his father worked. In 1883, he began working as a journalist. He spent a great deal of his life traveling abroad and he lived for some time in Berlin in the 1890s, where he was influenced by materialism and socialism. His writings were also guided by the realism and naturalism of the French writer Émile Zola (1840–1902). In addition to being a prolific writer, he was also an outspoken critic of Tsarist rule and of the German landowners. Following the founding of the Republic of Estonia in 1918, he was a member of the Estonian Constituent Assembly. He later served as an ambassador in Berlin for several years, and spent the last years of his life editing and revising an enormous volume of his collected works. After his death in 1933, he became the first person to be interred at Metsakalmistu, in the Pirita district of Tallinn.

== Works ==
- Musta mantliga mees (1886)
- Kuhu päike ei paista (1888)
- Kõtistamise kõrred (1888)
- Karikas kihvti (1893)
- "Linda" aktsiad (1894)
- Külmale maale (1896)
- Raudsed käed (1898)
- Mahtra sõda (1902)
- Kui Anija mehed Tallinnas käisid (1903)
- Prohvet Maltsvet (1905–1908)
- Jutustused (1913)
- Mäeküla piimamees (1916)
- Tabamata ime (1912)
- Pisuhänd (1913)
- Side (1917)
- Rahva sulased (unfinished, Looming 1934/1–3)
- story Jobu
- Minu esimesed triibulised

== Gallery ==
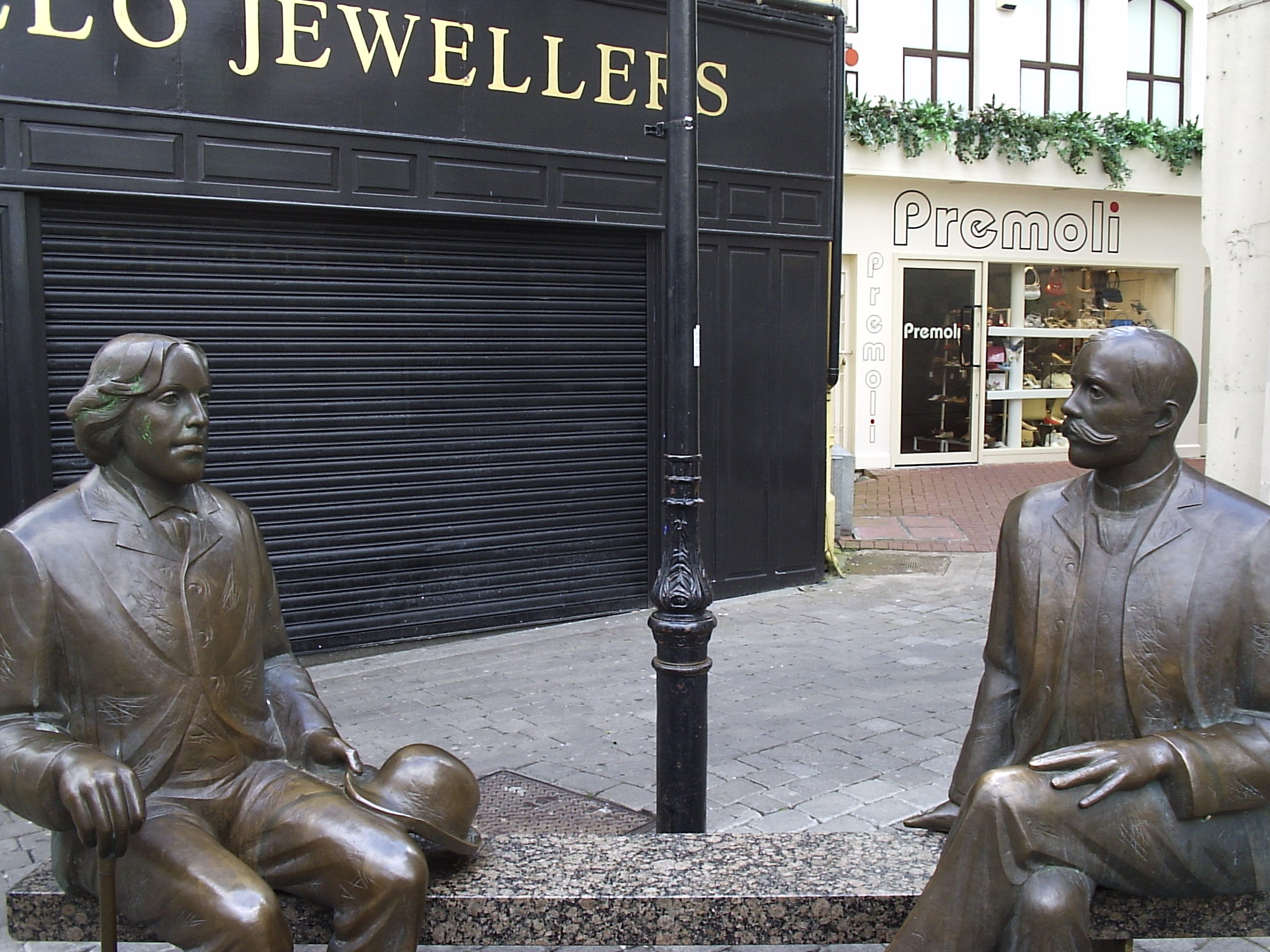
Statues of Oscar Wilde and Eduard Vilde in Galway. The original of this sculpture is located in Tartu.

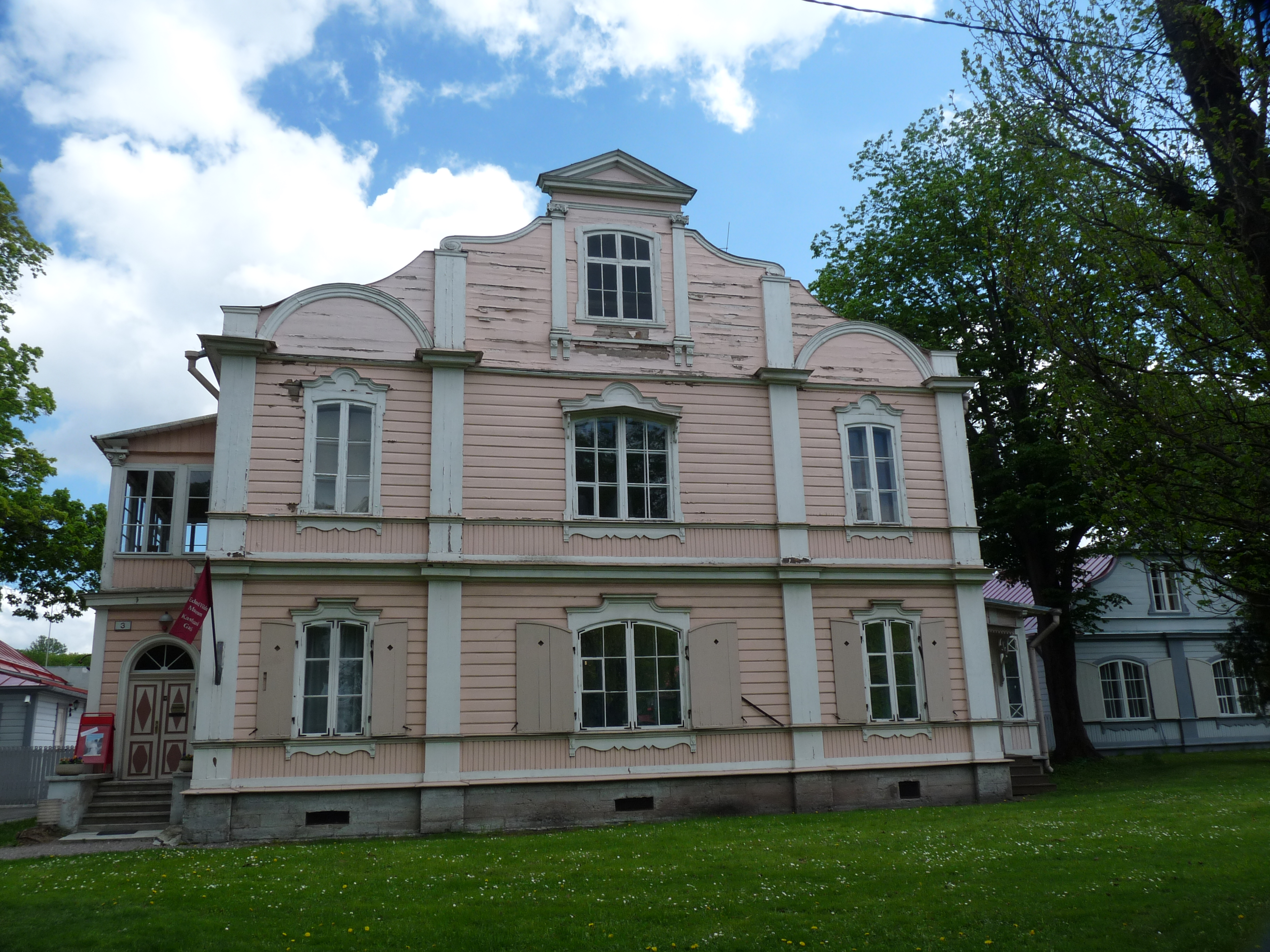
House in Kadriorg, where Eduard Vilde lived from 1927 to 1933

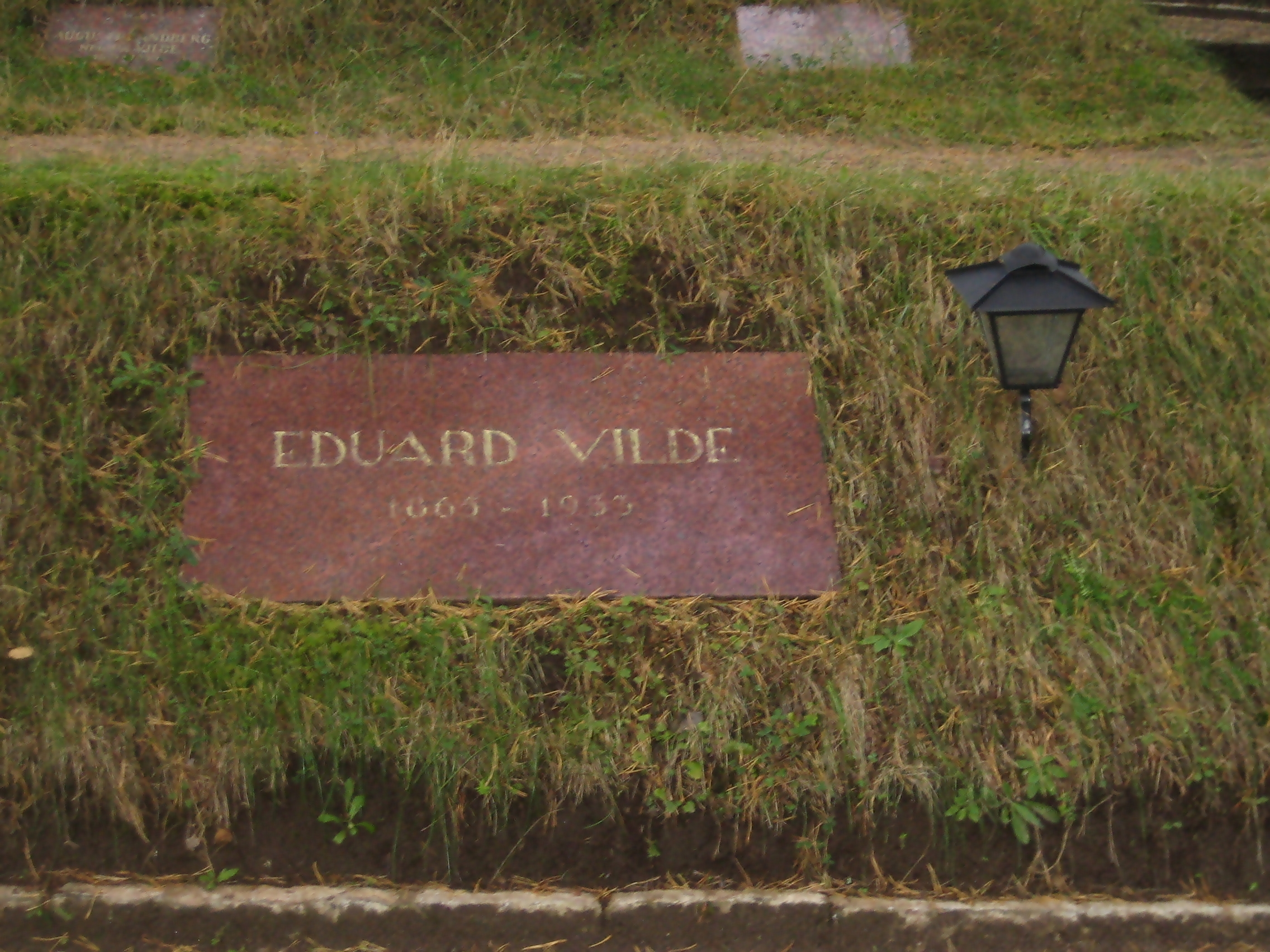
Grave of Eduard Vilde at Tallinn's Forest Cemetery

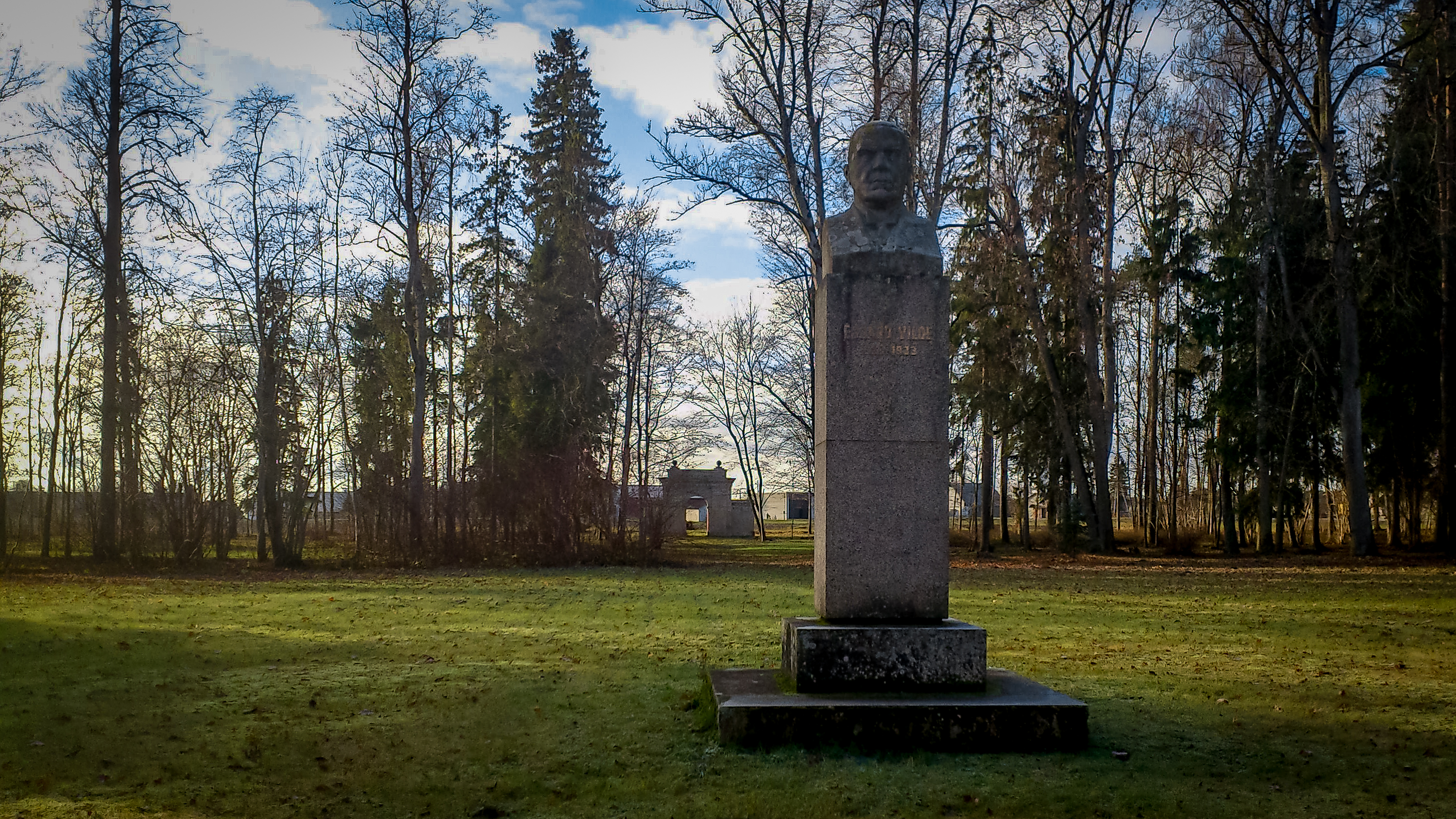
Monument of Vilde in the park at Muuga Manor

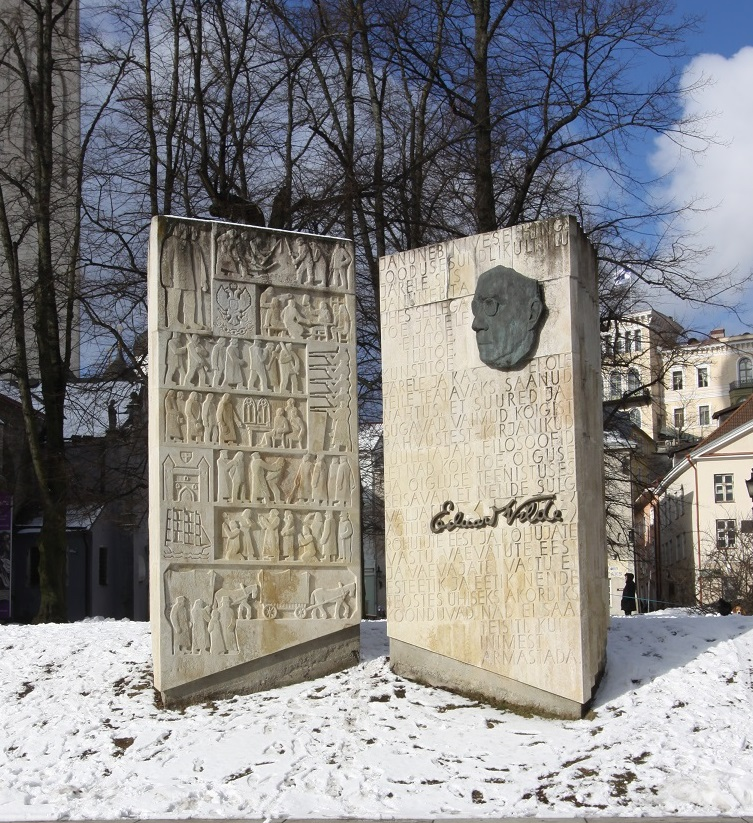
Memorial to Vilde in Tallinn
