= Mahtra War =

1858 peasant revolt in Estonia

- Part of Peasant unrest in the Russian Empire
- Date: May–July 1858
- Location: Mahtra, Estonia, Russian Empire
- Result: Russian authorities suppress the revolt

Parties
Russian Empire	Estonian peasants of Mahtra Manor

Lead figures
Russian military authorities	Peasant leaders of Mahtra Manor

Casualties and losses
1 officer killed 13 soldiers wounded	7 killed in the conflict 14 wounded 3 later died of their wounds

Casualties
- Arrested: 65 peasants tried by court martial
- 44 death sentences were commuted to corporal punishment; 35 of those sentenced were subsequently exiled to Siberia. The remaining 21 defendants were released.

The Mahtra War (Estonian: Mahtra sõda) was a peasant revolt at Mahtra Manor in Estonia, then part of the Russian Empire, from May to July 1858. The uprising was a response to tensions surrounding the implementation of new peasant regulations and the obligations imposed on the local peasantry.

The revolt was suppressed by Russian military forces. Fourteen peasants were wounded and seven were killed during the fighting, while three others later died from their wounds. On the government side, 13 soldiers were wounded and one officer was killed. Following the revolt, 65 peasants were tried by a court martial in Tallinn. Fourteen were initially sentenced to death, but Baltic governor-general Alexander Arkadyevich Suvorov later commuted the sentences of 44 defendants to corporal punishment; 35 of those sentenced were subsequently exiled to Siberia, while the remaining 21 defendants were released.

The Mahtra War became one of the best-known examples of peasant resistance in nineteenth-century Estonia. The conflict reflected wider tensions between Estonian peasants, the Baltic German landowning elite, and the authorities of the Russian Empire during the period of peasant emancipation and administrative reform. Its suppression and the subsequent punishment of the participants became an important episode in the history of Estonian peasant movements.

== Historical context ==
In the Governorate of Estonia, serfdom was abolished in 1816 (in comparison, in the whole Russian Empire it was abolished in 1861); however, the land was not redistributed among the peasants and corvée labor was preserved (until 1876). The March 19, 1856 manifesto of Tsar Alexander II spoke about further agrarian reforms, but the implementation was slow, and this sparked unrest, including the Mahtra revolt.

The events significantly influenced the work of the committees working on emancipation of the serfs in Russia.

== In culture ==
- Mahtra Peasant Museum (Estonian: Mahtra Talurahvamuuseum) ,
- Eduard Vilde, Mahtra sõda (The Mahtra War), historical novel (1902; Russian translation: Эдуард Вильде, Война в Махтра, 1950, Tallinn, publisher: Художественная литeратура и искусство)
- Anatoli Garshnek, "Mahtra sõda" (The Mahtra War) (1958), cantata
