= Juuru =

Small borough in Estonia

- Small borough
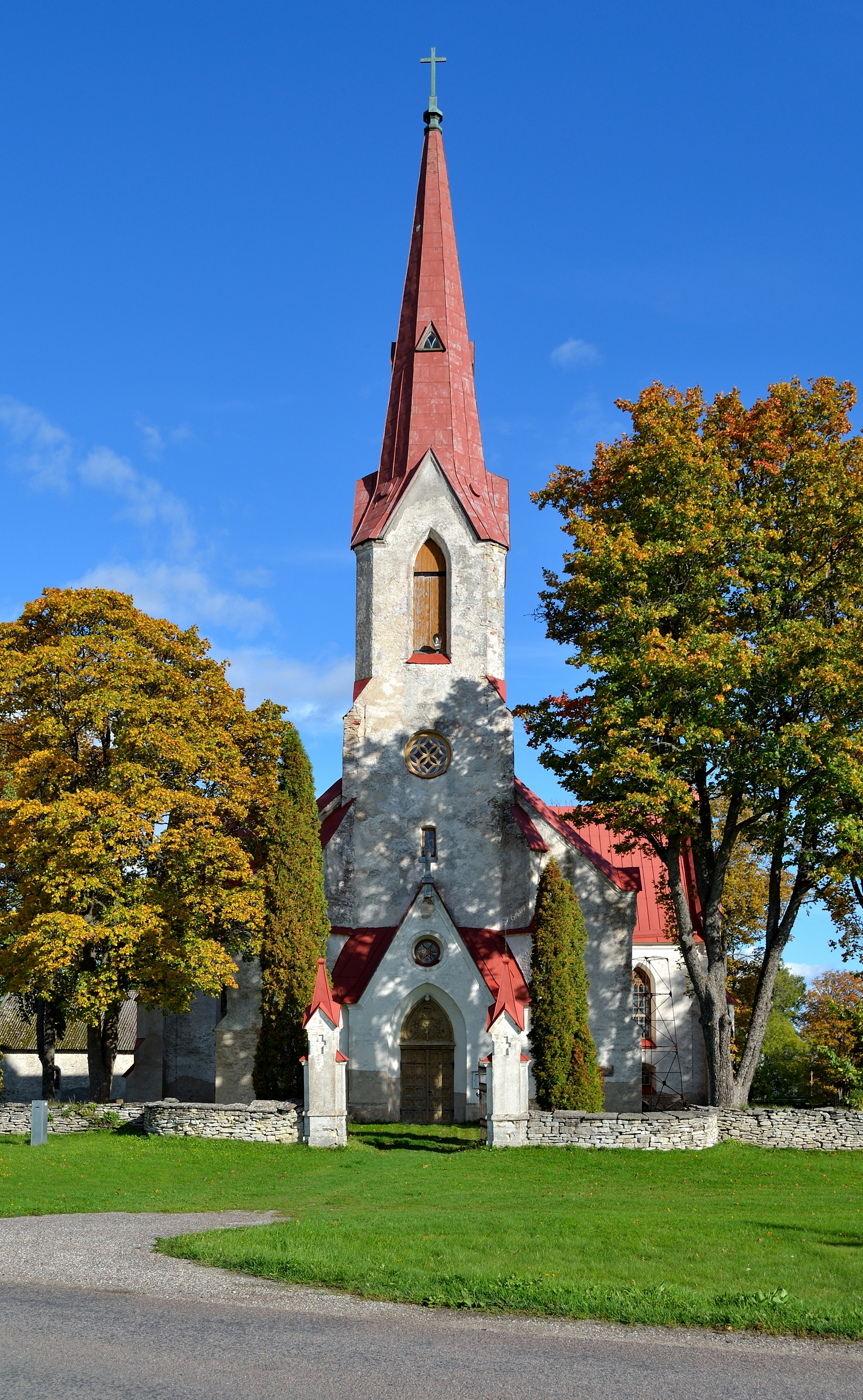
- Juuru Church

- Location in Estonia
- Coordinates: 59°03′38″N 24°57′22″E
- Country: Estonia
- County: Rapla County
- Municipality: Rapla Parish

Juuru (German: Jörden) is a small borough (Estonian: alevik) in Rapla Parish, Rapla County, Estonia. From 1991 until 2017 (until the administrative reform of Estonian local governments), Juuru was the administrative center of Juuru Parish.

The school in Juuru is named after the writer Eduard Vilde. The school was a high school until 2014. The Atla-Eeru Inn, which played a role in the Mahtra War of 1858, is located in Juuru.

== Notable people ==
- Sirje Endre (born 1945), journalist and former politician, born in Juuru

== Gallery ==
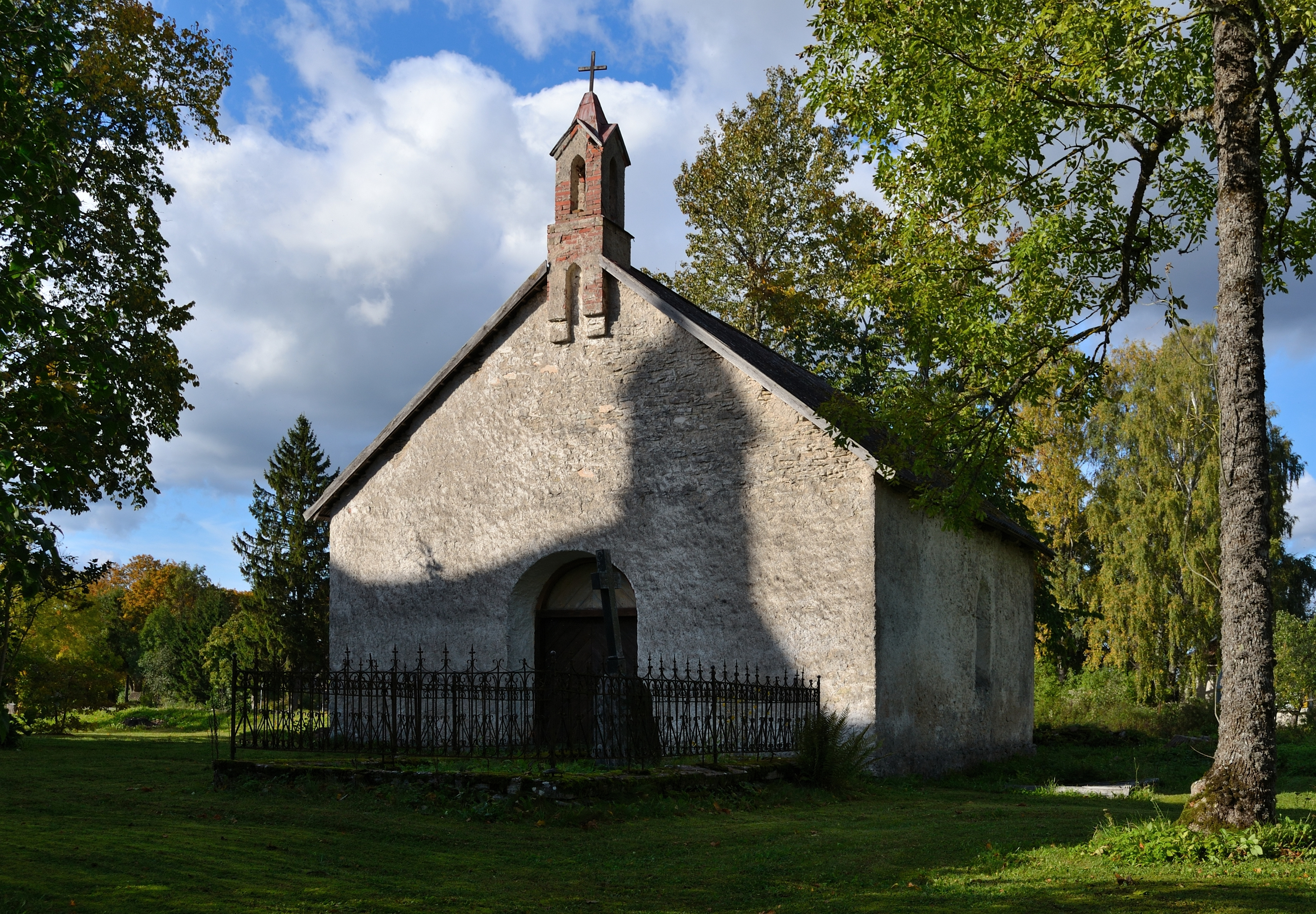
Chapel in Juuru churchyard

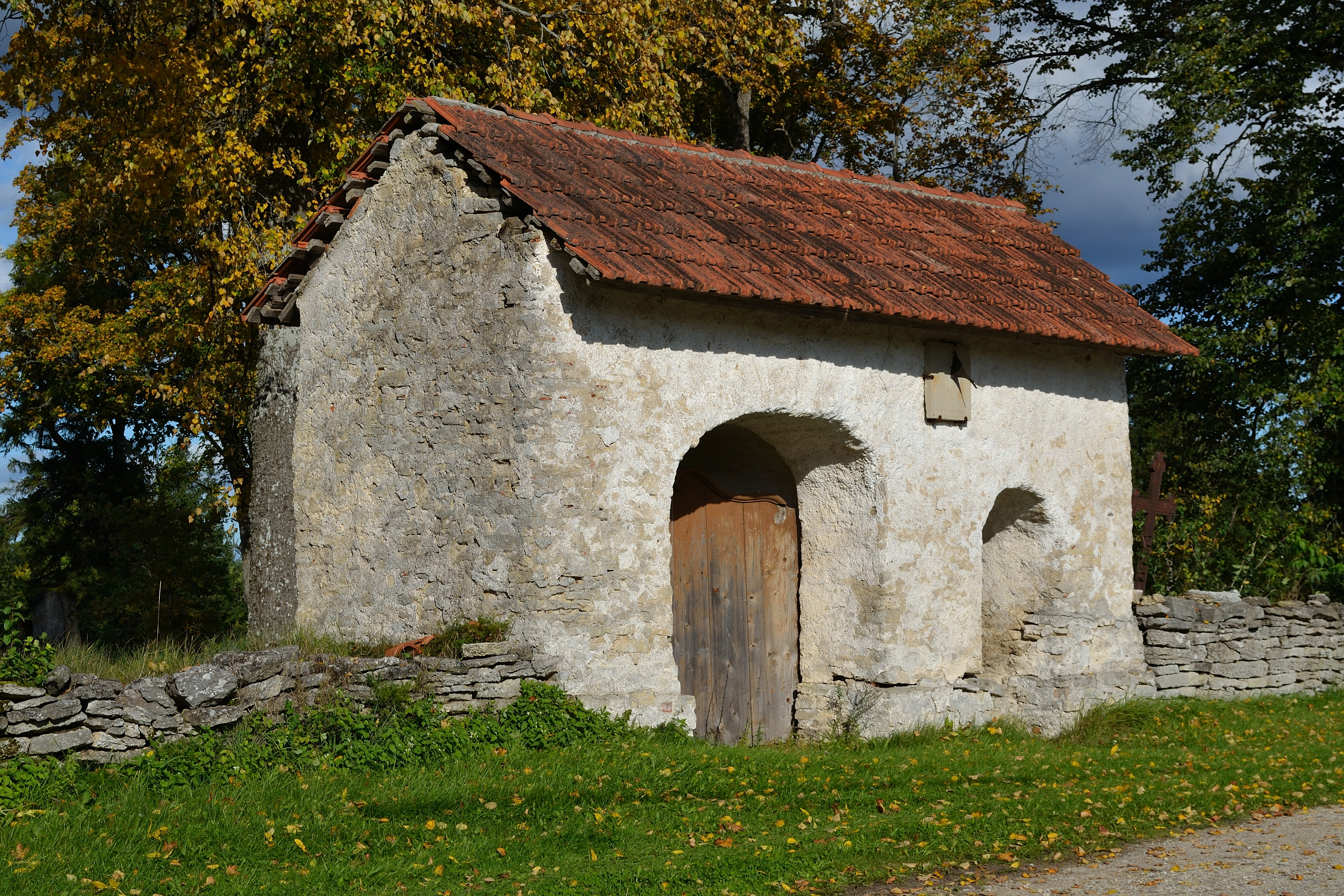
A gate with a sundial on the churchyard wall

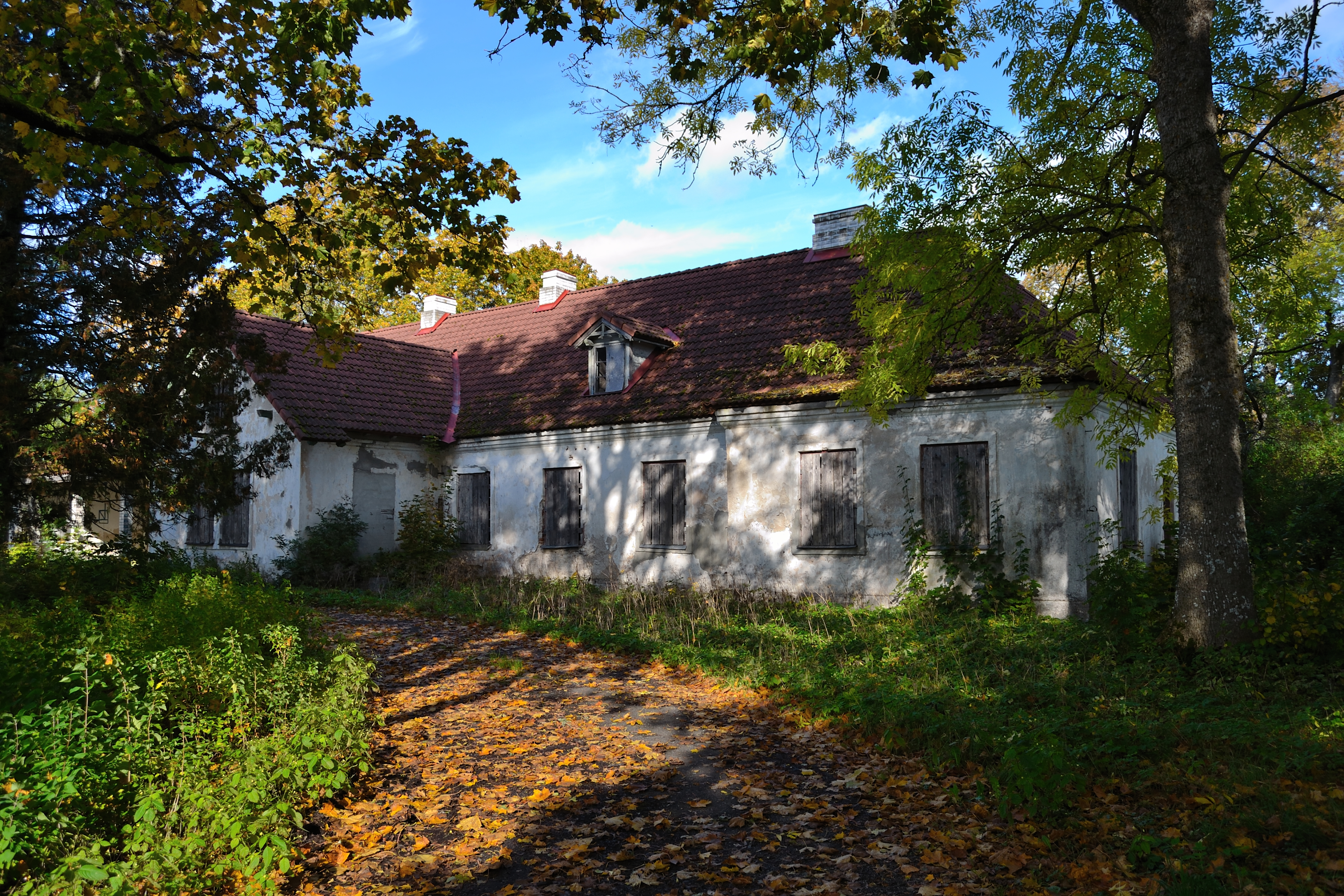
Main building of Juuru Manor

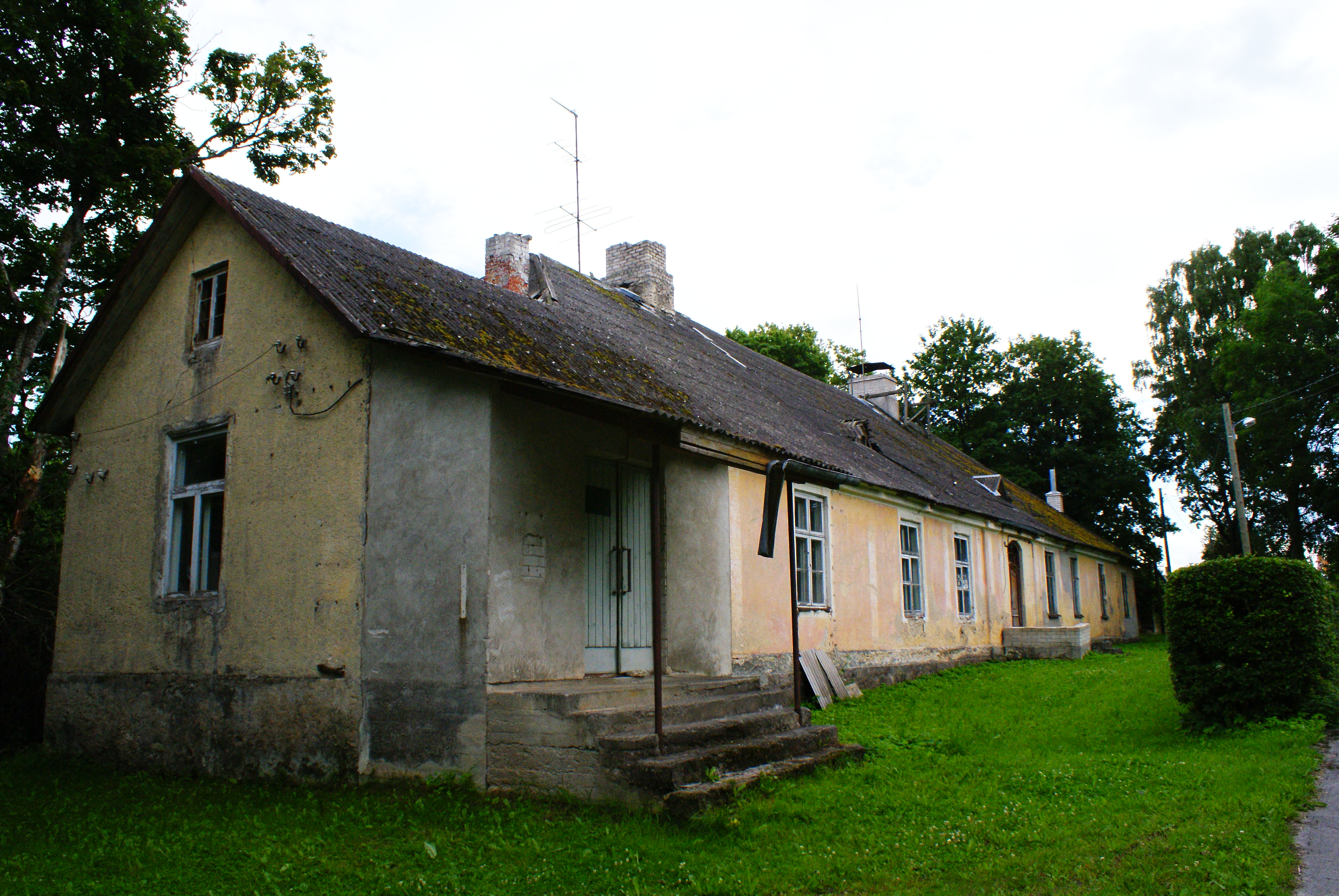
Juuru rectory
