= Uusküla, Rapla County =

Village in Estonia

Coordinates: 59°00′N 24°48′E

Uusküla
- Village
- Interactive map of Uusküla
- Country: Estonia
- County: Rapla County
- Parish: Rapla Parish
- Time zone: UTC+2 (EET)
  - Summer (DST): UTC+3 (EEST)

Uusküla is a village in Rapla Parish, Rapla County in northwestern Estonia. Rapla Cemetery is located in Uusküla.

== Name ==
Uusküla was attested in written sources as Usekulle in 1409, Husekull in 1410, and Udenküll in 1725. The name literally means 'new village'. It is hypothesized that the village was created after the establishment of Alu Manor to the northwest and the loss of the village at that site, and that the name refers to a new substitute village.

== Notable people ==
Notable people that were born or lived in Uusküla include the following:

- Otto Tief (1889–1976), politician, lawyer, and military commander, born in Uusküla

== Gallery ==
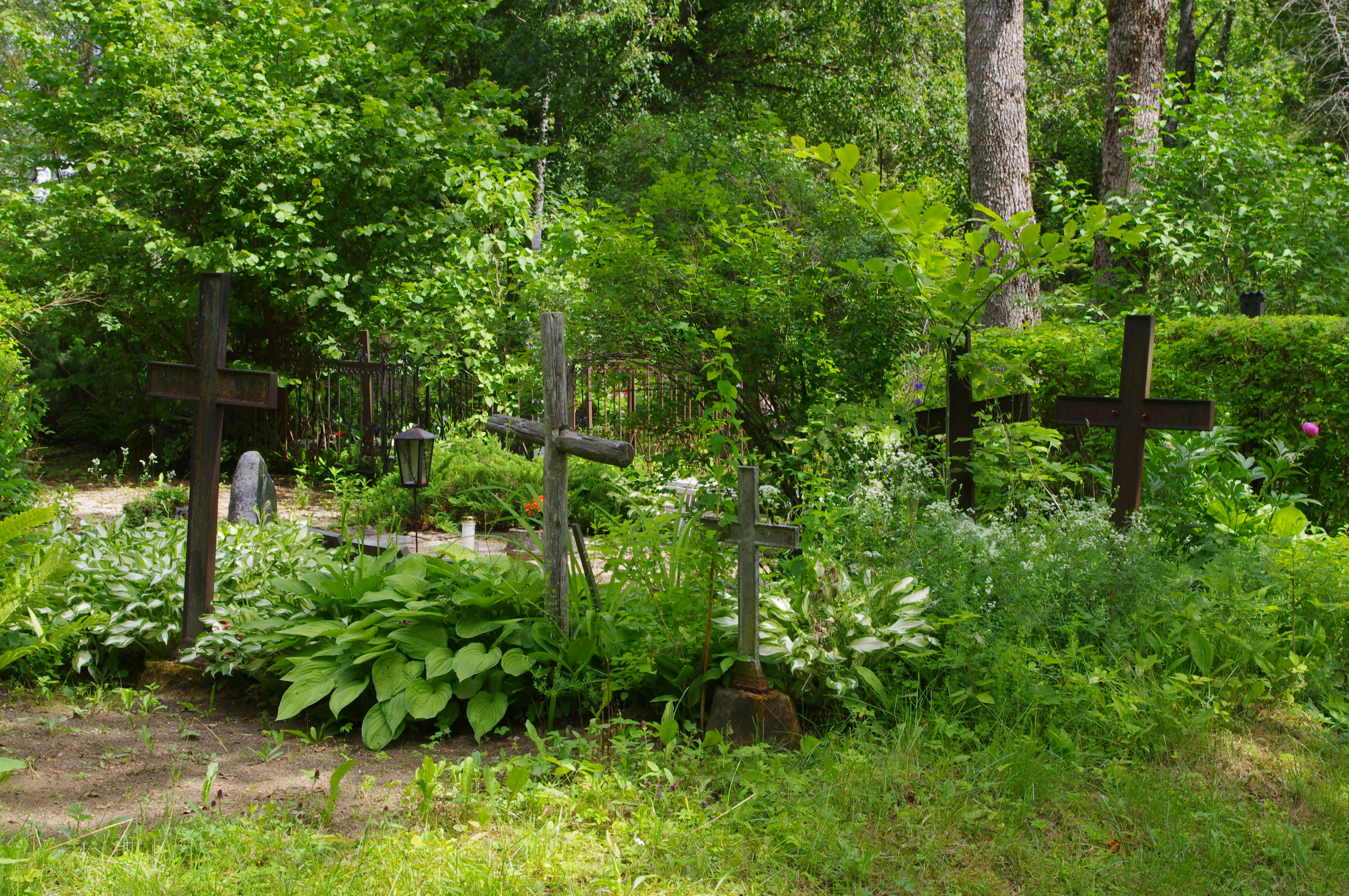
Rapla cemetery

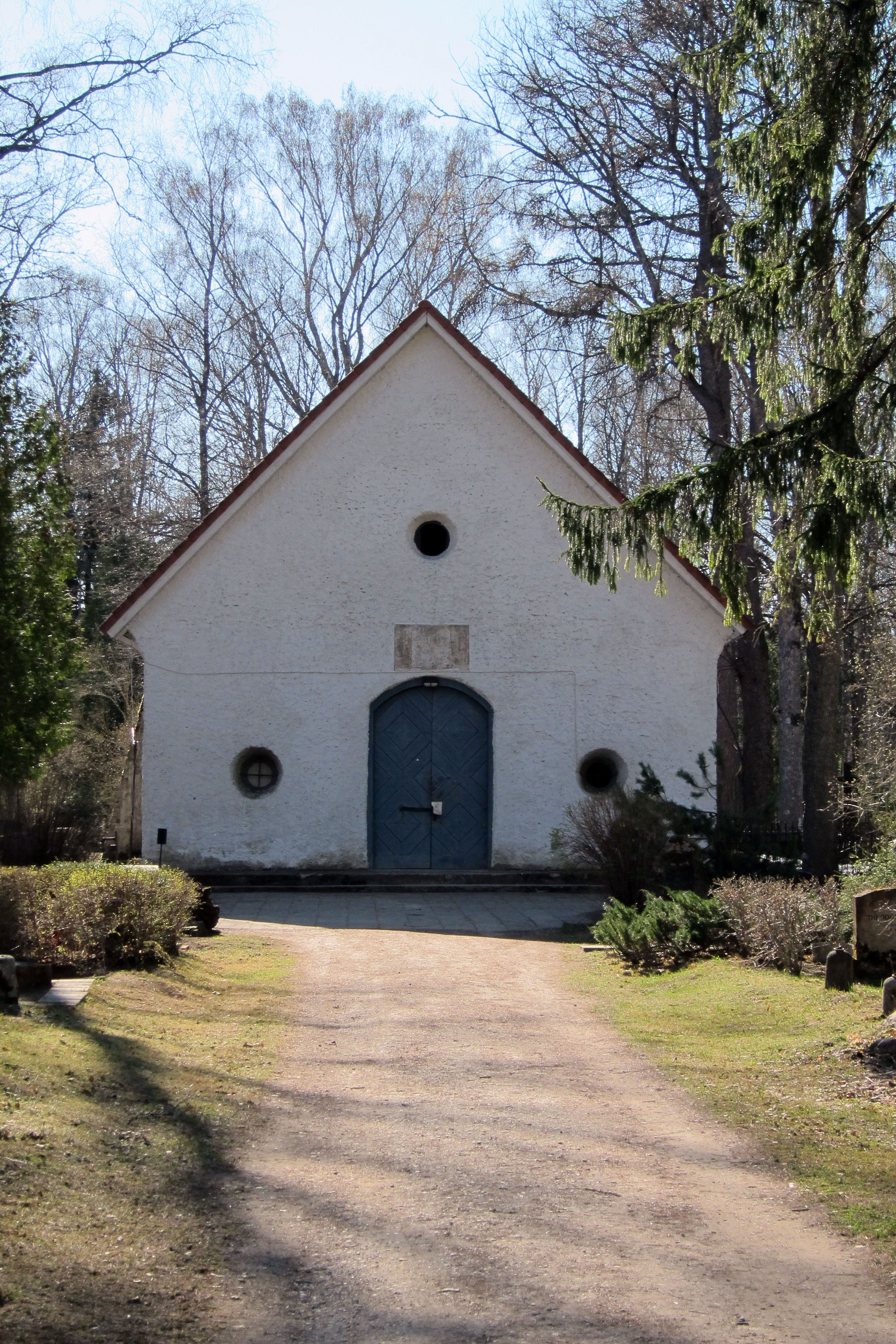
Chapel in the cemetery

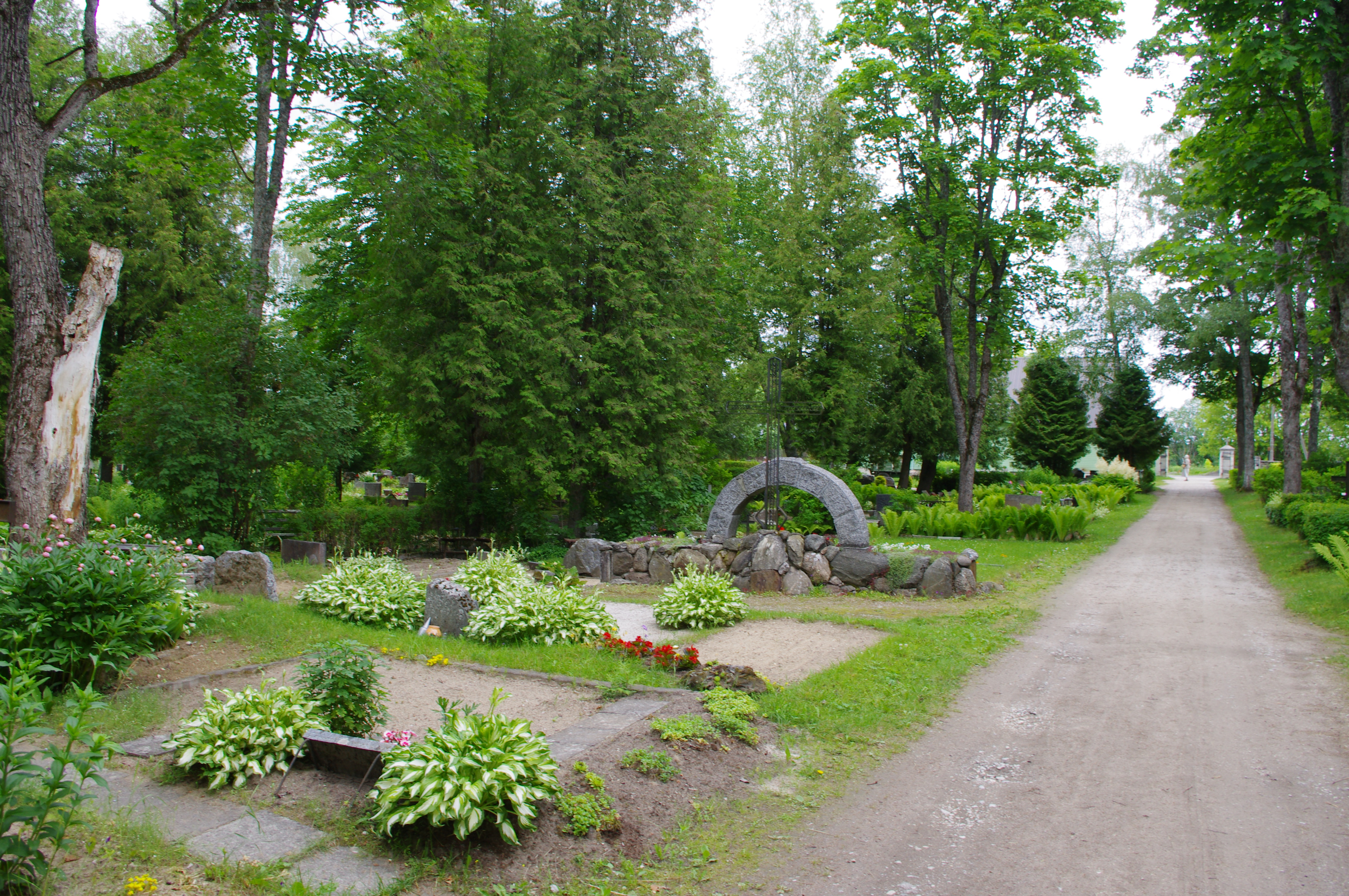
Grave of World War II victims
