= Oola, Estonia =

Village in Estonia

Coordinates: 59°03′N 24°53′E

Oola
- Village
- Interactive map of Oola
- Country: Estonia
- County: Rapla County
- Parish: Rapla Parish
- Time zone: UTC+2 (EET)
  - Summer (DST): UTC+3 (EEST)

Oola is a village in Rapla Parish, Rapla County in northwestern Estonia.
