= Väljataguse =

Väljataguse may refer to several places in Estonia:

- Väljataguse, Järva County, a village in Türi Parish, Järva County
- Väljataguse, Jõgeva County, a village in Põltsamaa Parish, Jõgeva County
- Väljataguse, Rapla County, a village in Rapla Parish, Rapla County
