= Koigi, Rapla County =

Village in Estonia

Coordinates: 59°04′20″N 24°45′36″E

Koigi
- Village
- Interactive map of Koigi
- Country: Estonia
- County: Rapla County
- Parish: Rapla Parish
- Time zone: UTC+2 (EET)
  - Summer (DST): UTC+3 (EEST)

Koigi is a village in Rapla Parish, Rapla County in northwestern Estonia.
