= Mällu =

Village in Estonia

- Village
- Interactive map of Mällu
- Coordinates: 59°00′N 24°40′E
- Country: Estonia
- County: Rapla County
- Parish: Rapla Parish
- Time zone: UTC+2 (EET)
  - Summer (DST): UTC+3 (EEST)

Mällu is a village in Rapla Parish, Rapla County in northwestern Estonia.
