= Seli-Nurme =

Village in Estonia

- Village
- Location within Estonia
- Coordinates: 59.061987489177085°N 24.733295189994003°E
- Country: Estonia
- County: Rapla County
- Parish: Rapla Parish
- Time zone: UTC+2 (EET)
  - Summer (DST): UTC+3 (EEST)

Seli-Nurme is a village in Rapla Parish, Rapla County in northwestern Estonia.
