= Kodila =

Village in Estonia

Coordinates: 59°02′24″N 24°40′22″E

- Village
- Interactive map of Kodila
- Country: Estonia
- County: Rapla County
- Parish: Rapla Parish
- Time zone: UTC+2 (EET)
  - Summer (DST): UTC+3 (EEST)

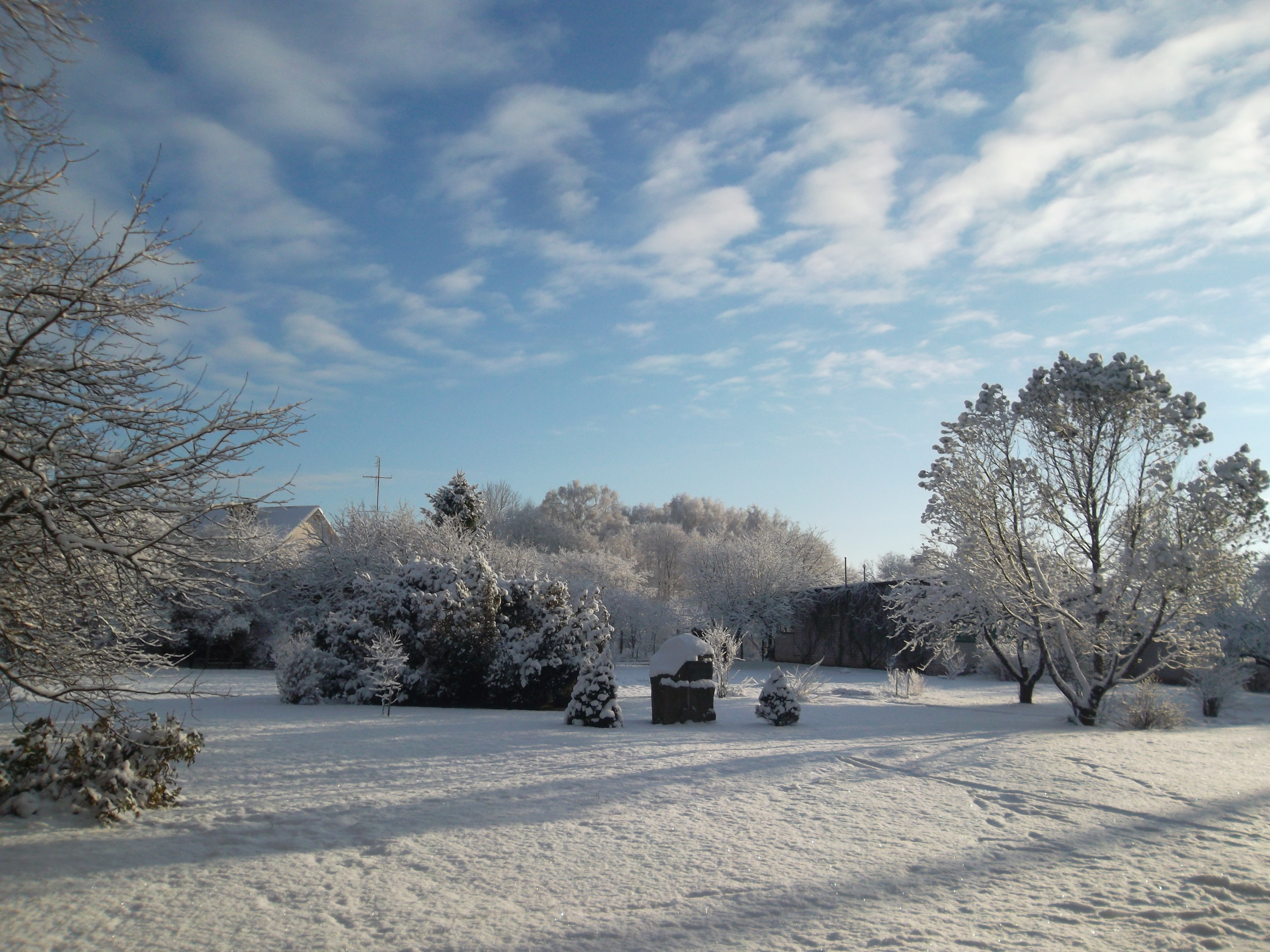
Winter in the village of Kodila

Kodila is a village in Rapla Parish, Rapla County in northwestern Estonia.
