= Ülejõe, Rapla Parish =

Village in Estonia

Coordinates: 59.01006°N 24.84329°E

Ülejõe
- Village
- Interactive map of Ülejõe
- Country: Estonia
- County: Rapla County
- Parish: Rapla Parish
- Time zone: UTC+2 (EET)
  - Summer (DST): UTC+3 (EEST)

Ülejõe is a village in Rapla Parish, Rapla County in northwestern Estonia.

The village lies roughly 45 mi (or 73 km) South-East of Tallinn, the Estonian capital.
