= Raka, Rapla County =

Village in Estonia

Coordinates: 59°03′31″N 24°41′15″E

Raka
- Village
- Interactive map of Raka
- Country: Estonia
- County: Rapla County
- Parish: Rapla Parish
- Time zone: UTC+2 (EET)
  - Summer (DST): UTC+3 (EEST)

Raka is a village in Rapla Parish, Rapla County in northwestern Estonia.
