= Nõmme, Rapla County =

Village in Estonia

Coordinates: 59°02′23″N 24°51′55″E

Nõmme
- Village
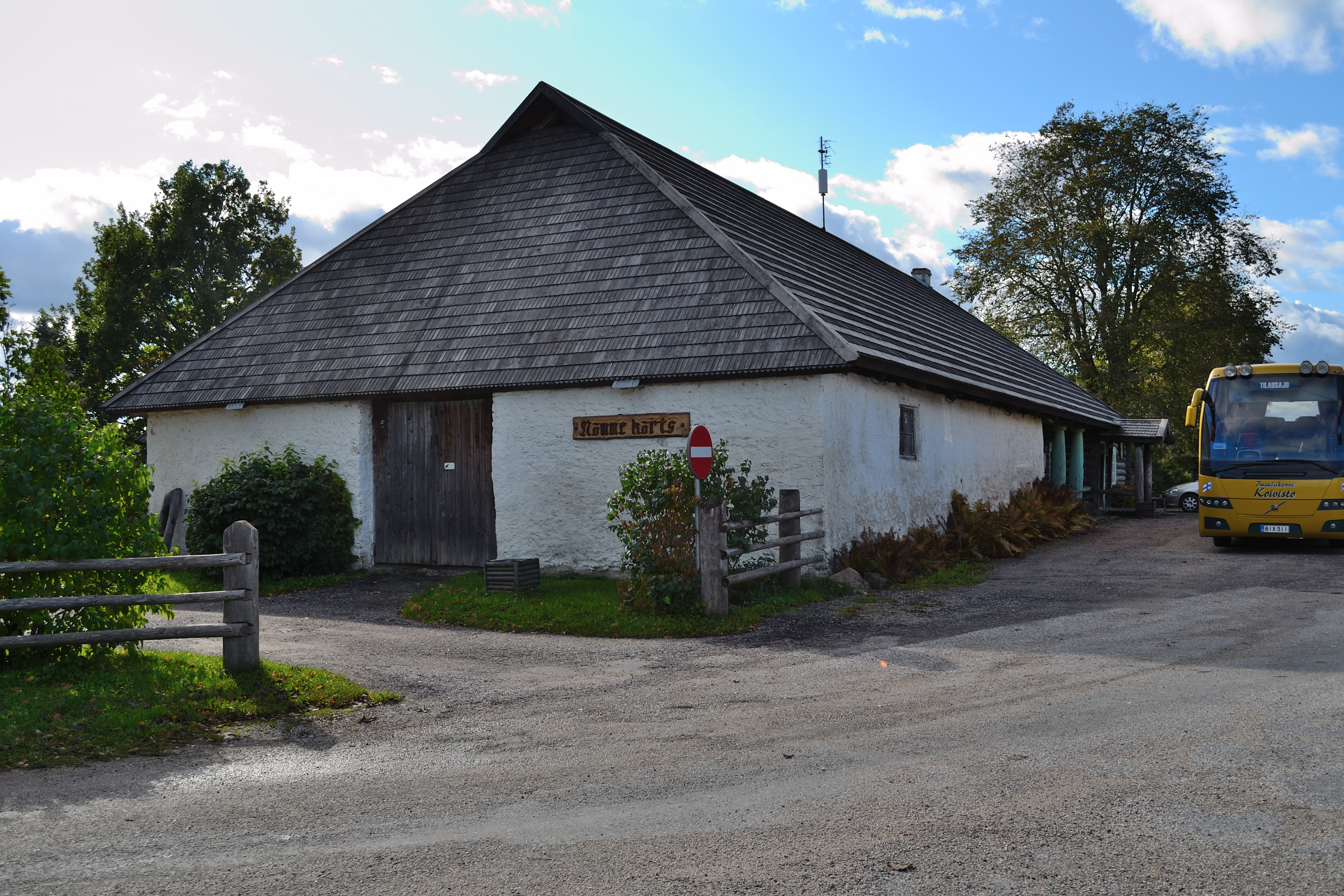
- Nõmme tavern from the beginning of 19th century.
- Interactive map of Nõmme
- Country: Estonia
- County: Rapla County
- Parish: Rapla Parish
- Time zone: UTC+2 (EET)
  - Summer (DST): UTC+3 (EEST)

Nõmme is a village in Rapla Parish, Rapla County in northwestern Estonia.

== Name ==
Nõmme is probably named after the Nõmme tavern, which was attested in historical sources as Nöme in 1798. Ultimately, the name comes from the common noun nõmm (genitive: nõmme) 'heath, moor, moorland', referring to the local geography.
