= Palamulla =

Village in Estonia

Coordinates: 59°01′N 24°39′E

- Village
- Interactive map of Palamulla
- Country: Estonia
- County: Rapla County
- Parish: Rapla Parish
- Time zone: UTC+2 (EET)
  - Summer (DST): UTC+3 (EEST)

Palamulla is a village in Rapla Parish, Rapla County in northwestern Estonia.
