= Juula, Rapla County =

Village in Estonia

Coordinates: 58°58′39″N 24°48′51″E

Juula
- Village
- Interactive map of Juula
- Country: Estonia
- County: Rapla County
- Parish: Rapla Parish
- Time zone: UTC+2 (EET)
  - Summer (DST): UTC+3 (EEST)

Juula is a village in Rapla Parish, Rapla County in northwestern Estonia.
