= Villem Kapp =

Estonian composer

- Born: 7 September 1913; Suure-Jaani, Governorate of Livonia, Russian Empire
- Died: 24 March 1964 (aged 50); Tallinn, then part of Estonian SSR, Soviet Union

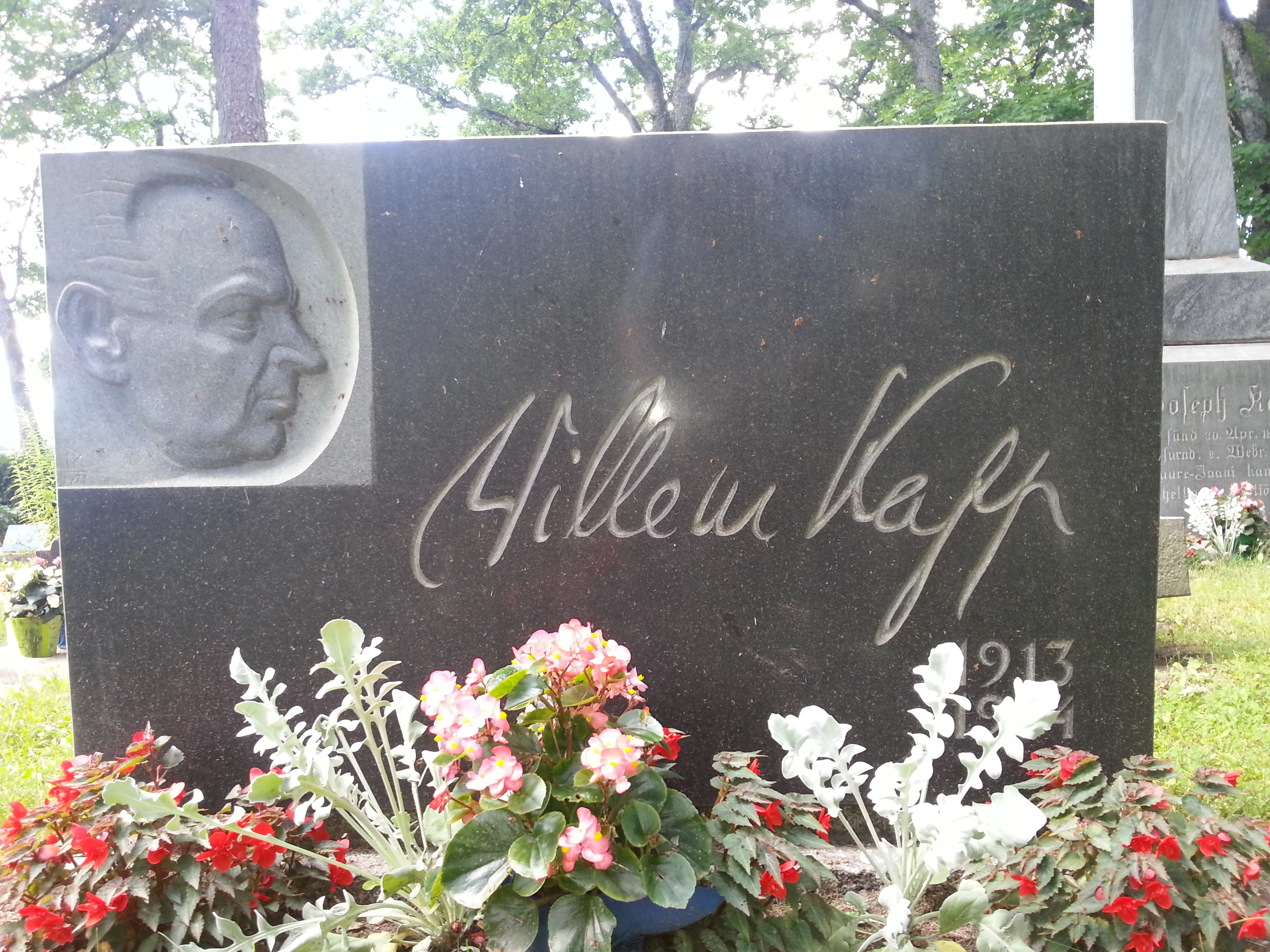
Villem Kapp's grave stone.

Villem Kapp (7 September 1913 – 24 March 1964) was an Estonian composer, organist and music teacher.

== Life ==
Born in Suure-Jaani, in the Governorate of Livonia of the Russian Empire (now Estonia), Villem Kapp was the son of Hans Kapp who was a sacristan, teacher and choir director.

Villem Kapp graduated in 1938, having studied organ with August Topman and again in 1944 having studied composition with Heino Eller. In addition, Kapp studied with his uncle Artur Kapp at the Tallinn Conservatory.

From 1938 Kapp was the organist in Tartu where he ran many famous choirs. After World War II he worked mainly as a composer and taught composition at the State Conservatory of Tallinn from 1944 until his untimely death in 1964. His students included Helmut Rosenvald, Lembit Veevo, Ülo Vinter, Veljo Tormis, Harri Otsa and others.

Villem Kapp's works are characterized by rich melodies and he is strongly connected to the national romantic movement. In 1950, Kapp was awarded the State Prize of the Estonian SSR and, in 1963, he was awarded the People's Artist of the Estonian Soviet Socialist Republic.

In 1971 a museum was opened in Suure-Jaani dedicated to the life and work of the Kapp family musicians, including Kapp, his uncle Artur Kapp and his cousin Eugen Kapp.

== Works ==
Incomplete List:

- Ööpoeem (for Symphony Orchestra, 1942)
- Põhjarannik (Heroic Choral Poem, 1958)
- Lembitu (Opera, 1961) - Perhaps Kapp's Magnum Opus; An historical opera based on Estonia's fight for independence in the 13th century, including the Battle of St. Matthew's Day and the eponymous Estonian elder of Sakala County and military leader. The ancient Sakala County included the areas where Kapp grew up, so the themes were particularly close to his heart.
- Kevadele (Cantata, 1963)

In addition to these, Kapp also wrote two symphonies (In 1947 and 1955), as well as more than sixty choral and solo songs.

== Partial discography ==
- Symphony No. 2 - on "Baltic Voyage: Heroic Symphonies From Estonia", Neeme Järvi and the BBC Philharmonic Orchestra.
- Elegie - on "Silent Moods", Juha Kangas and the Ostrobothnian Chamber Orchestra.
- Põhjarannik - on "Neeme Jarvi: 70th Birthday Jubilee", Neeme Järvi, Kristjan Järvi, Estonian National Male Choir & Symphony Orchestra.

== Bibliography ==
- Helga Tõnson: Villem Kapp. Tallinn 1967
