= Alu-Metsküla =

Village in Estonia

Coordinates: 59°02′N 24°45′E

- Village
- Interactive map of Alu-Metsküla
- Country: Estonia
- County: Rapla County
- Parish: Rapla Parish

Population (2011)
  - Total: 36
- Time zone: UTC+2 (EET)
  - Summer (DST): UTC+3 (EEST)

Alu-Metsküla is a village in Rapla Parish, Rapla County in northwestern Estonia.
