= Kalevi =

Kalevi may refer to

- Kalevi (mythology), an ancient Finnish and Estonian ruler, known from the Finnish epic Kalevala and Estonian epic Kalevipoeg.
- Kalevi, Estonia, a village in Estonia
- Kalevi (given name), a Finnish and Estonian given name (including a list of people with the name)
