= Ridaküla, Rapla County =

Village in Estonia

Coordinates: 59°01′09″N 24°50′10″E

Ridaküla
- Village
- Interactive map of Ridaküla
- Country: Estonia
- County: Rapla County
- Parish: Rapla Parish
- Time zone: UTC+2 (EET)
  - Summer (DST): UTC+3 (EEST)

Ridaküla is a village in Rapla Parish, Rapla County in northwestern Estonia.
