= Seli, Rapla County =

Village in Estonia

Seli
- Village
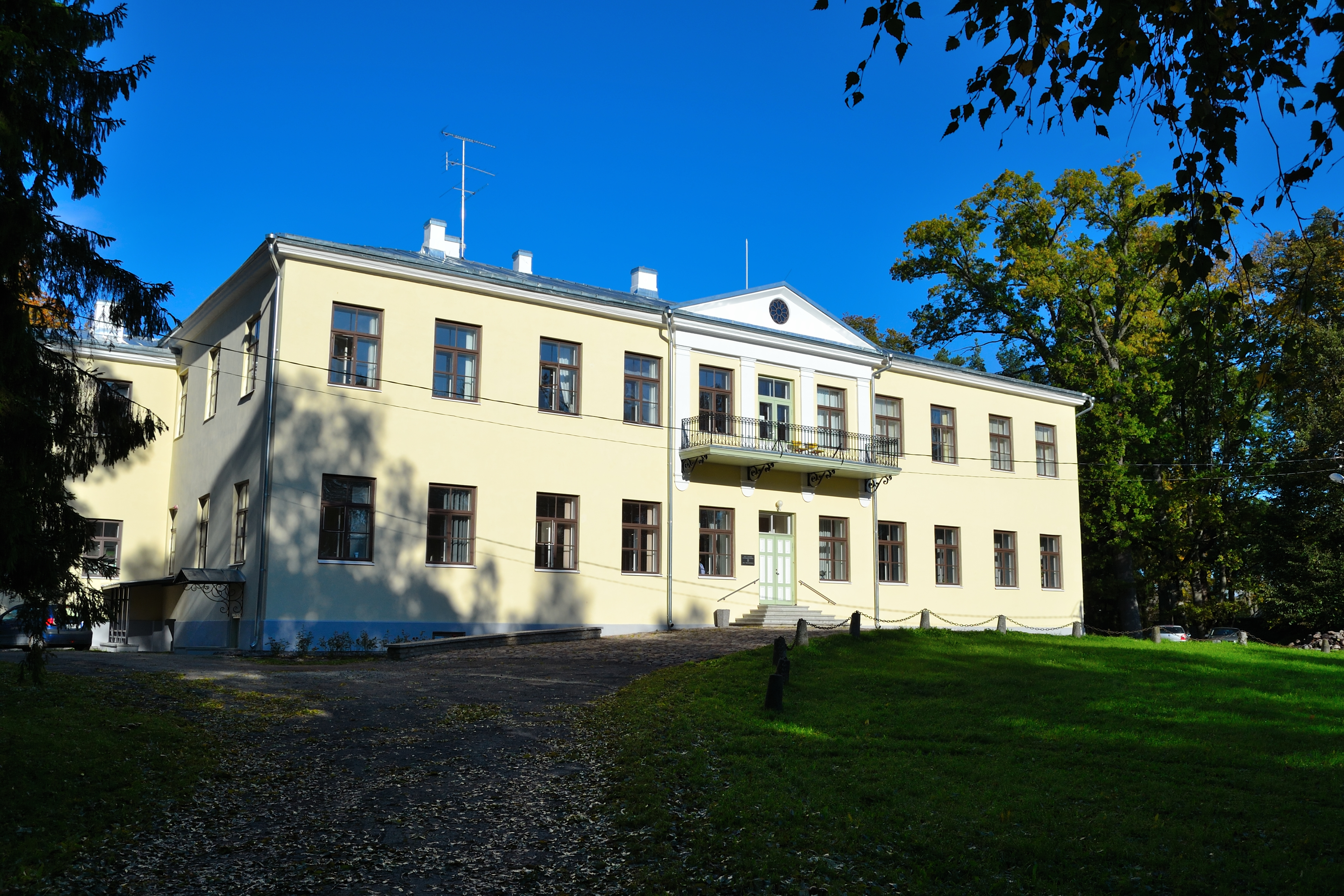
- Seli manor

- Location in Estonia
- Coordinates: 59°06′14″N 24°49′16″E
- Country: Estonia
- County: Rapla County
- Parish: Rapla Parish
- Time zone: UTC+2 (EET)
  - Summer (DST): UTC+3 (EEST)

Seli is a village in Rapla Parish, Rapla County in northwestern Estonia.

== Seli Manor ==
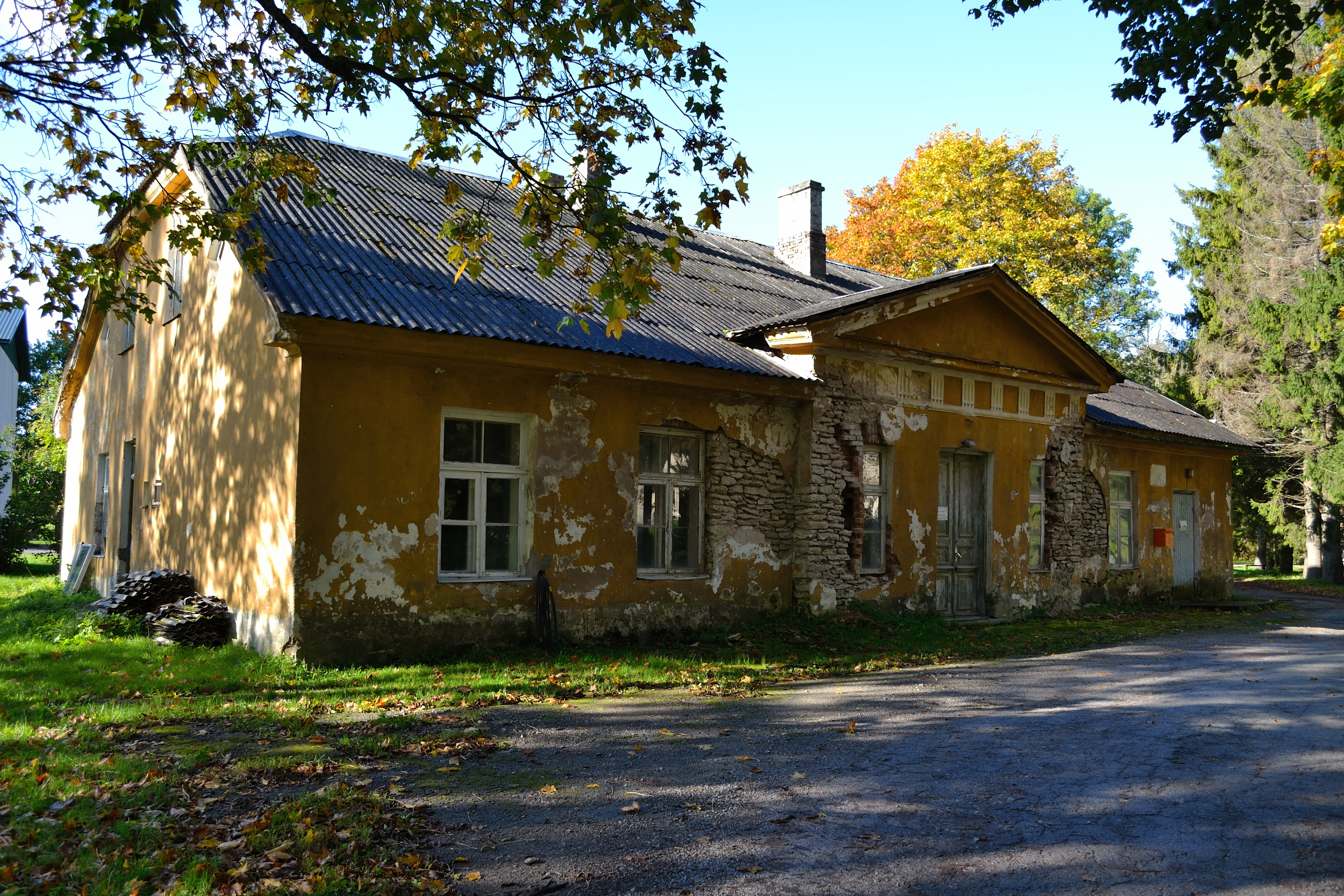
The steward's house, Seli manor.

Seli estate (German: Sellie) traces its history back to 1474, when it belonged to the Bridgettine convent of Pirita, near Tallinn. Later it became the property of Baltic noble families. During its later history, starting from the 20th century the building has housed various hospital institutions. The present building was originally built as a baroque manor in the 18th century. The wings were added around 1830, and at the end of the 19th century, balconies and changes to the façade were added. During the revolution of 1905, rioters burnt the house down and subsequently it received new, eclecticist interiors. During the Soviet occupation of Estonia, the decorated interiors were once again destroyed. Apart from the main building, several noteworthy outbuildings remain.

== See also ==
- List of palaces and manor houses in Estonia
