= Röa, Rapla County =

Village in Estonia

Coordinates: 59°06′05″N 24°48′01″E

Röa
- Village
- Interactive map of Röa
- Country: Estonia
- County: Rapla County
- Parish: Rapla Parish
- Time zone: UTC+2 (EET)
  - Summer (DST): UTC+3 (EEST)

Röa is a village in Rapla Parish, Rapla County, Estonia.
