= Tuti =

Tuti may refer to:

== Places ==
- Tuti, Estonia, a village
- Tuti, Sistan and Baluchestan, Iran
- Tuti, South Khorasan, Iran, a village
- Tuti District, Peru
- Tuti Island, Sudan

== People ==
- Tuti Indra Malaon (1939-1989), Indonesian actress, dancer and lecturer born Pudjiastuti Suratno
- Tuti Yusupova (1880?-2015), Uzbekistani claimed to be the longest-lived person ever
- Yuichi Tsuchiya (born 1979), Japanese actor nicknamed "Tuti"
