= Kuusiku-Nõmme =

Village in Estonia

Coordinates: 58°58′52″N 24°41′40″E

- Village
- Interactive map of Kuusiku-Nõmme
- Country: Estonia
- County: Rapla County
- Parish: Rapla Parish
- Time zone: UTC+2 (EET)
  - Summer (DST): UTC+3 (EEST)

Kuusiku-Nõmme is a village in Rapla Parish, Rapla County in northwestern Estonia.
