= Artur Kapp =

Estonian composer (1878–1952)

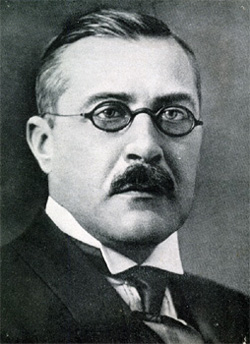
Artur Kapp

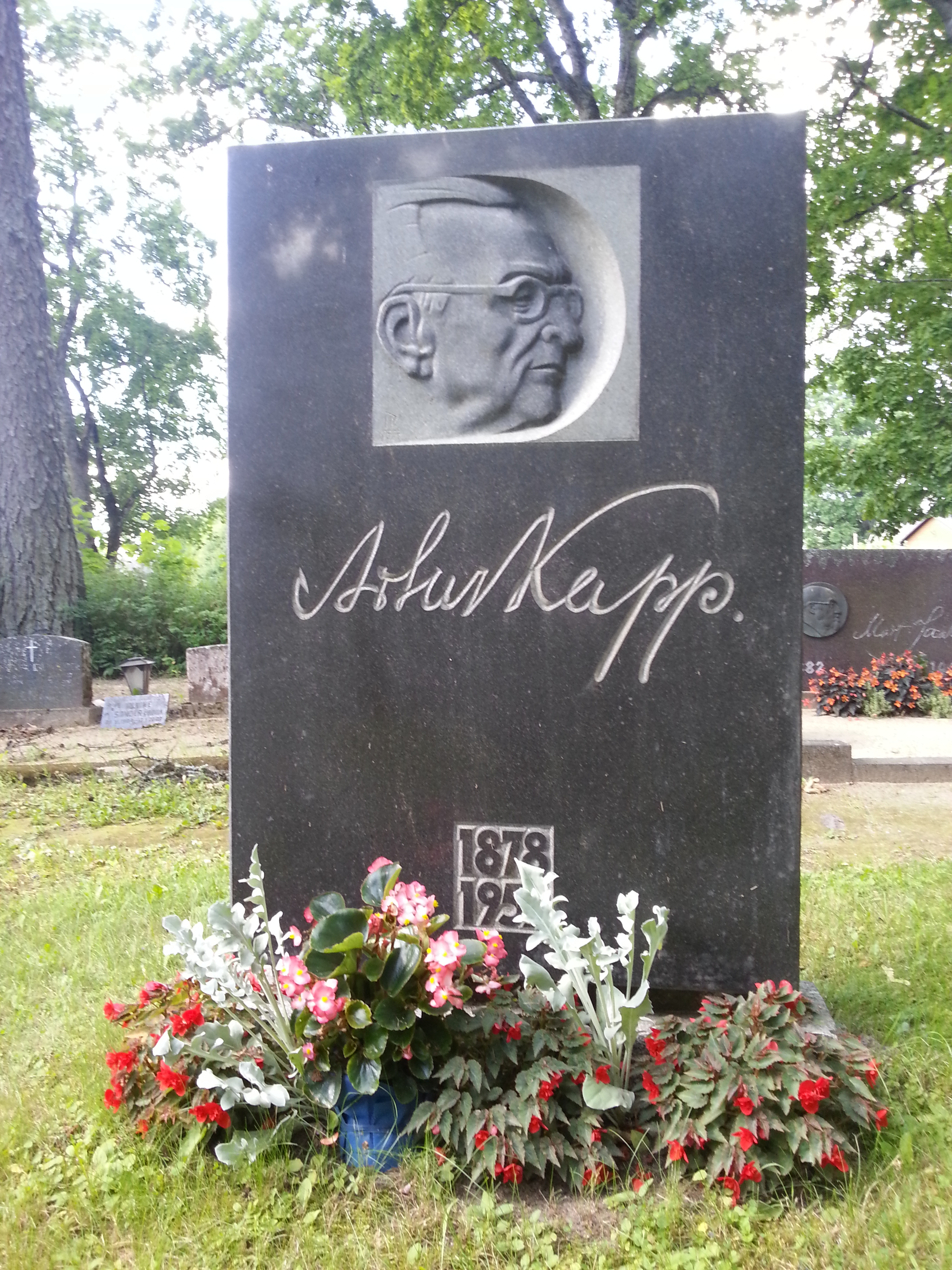
Artur Kapp's gravestone

Artur Kapp (28 February 1878 – 14 January 1952) was an Estonian composer.

== Early life and career ==
Born in Suure-Jaani, Estonia, then part of the Governorate of Livonia, Russian Empire, he was the son of Joosep Kapp, who was also a classically trained musician. Kapp began his musical career studying organ at the Saint Petersburg Conservatory as a student of both Louis Homilius and composition with Nikolai Rimsky-Korsakov in 1891. Kapp graduated from the Conservatory in 1900 as a composer and from 1904 until 1920 worked as a music director in the southern Russian city of Astrakhan, then returning to Estonia as a professor and conductor at the Tallinn Conservatory where he counted among his students such future notable Estonian composers as Evald Aav, Edgar Arro, Gustav Ernesaks, Helen Tobias-Duesberg, Riho Päts and Enn Võrk. He is, along with Rudolf Tobias (1873-1918), generally considered to be one of the founders of Estonian symphonic music.

Kapp's son Eugen (1908–1996) and nephew Villem (1913–1964) became notable composers as well, having studied at the Tallinn Conservatory under direction of the elder Kapp.

Some of Kapp's most enduring works are the 1899 overture Don Carlos and the 1900 cantata Paradiis ja Peri ("Paradise and Peri"), both of which are large scale works that prominently feature the organ. He is possibly best recalled for his oratorio Hiiob ("Job") and Metsateel ("On A Road Through The Woods"), a piece for solo voice. Kapp's work is abundant and diverse and covers many classical genres. He wrote five symphonies, five concertos, overtures, four orchestral suites, in addition to the above.

After the Soviet invasion of Estonia during World War II, Kapp was forced to resign his position as a composer and retired to Suure-Jaani. He died there in 1952 at the age of 73. His professional career spanned more than five decades. His last two major works were the overture "To the Party" (1947), the Symphony No. 4 (dedicated to the 30th anniversary of the Soviet Young Communist League, 1948), and the Symphony (Cantata-Symphony) No. 5 (Peace Symphony).

== Legacy ==
In 1998, the annual Suure-Jaani Music Days festival was founded to celebrate Artur Kapp's musical legacy, as well as that of his sons and fellow composer Mart Saar (1882-1963), who was also from the area. The Festival is organized by the Eesti Kontsert in conjunction with the town of Suure-Jaani and the International Artur Kapp Society. The venues for performances include Lutheran and Orthodox churches, the Kapp Museum, and the song festival stage.

== External links/Sources ==
- The International Arthur Kapp Society
- Eesti Muusika Infokeskus/Estonian Music Information Center
- Eesti Muusika Festivald - Suure-Jaani Music Days
