= Rapla Parish =

Municipality of Estonia (2017)

Coordinates: 59°0′25″N 24°47′34″E

Rapla Parish Rapla vald
- Municipality of Estonia
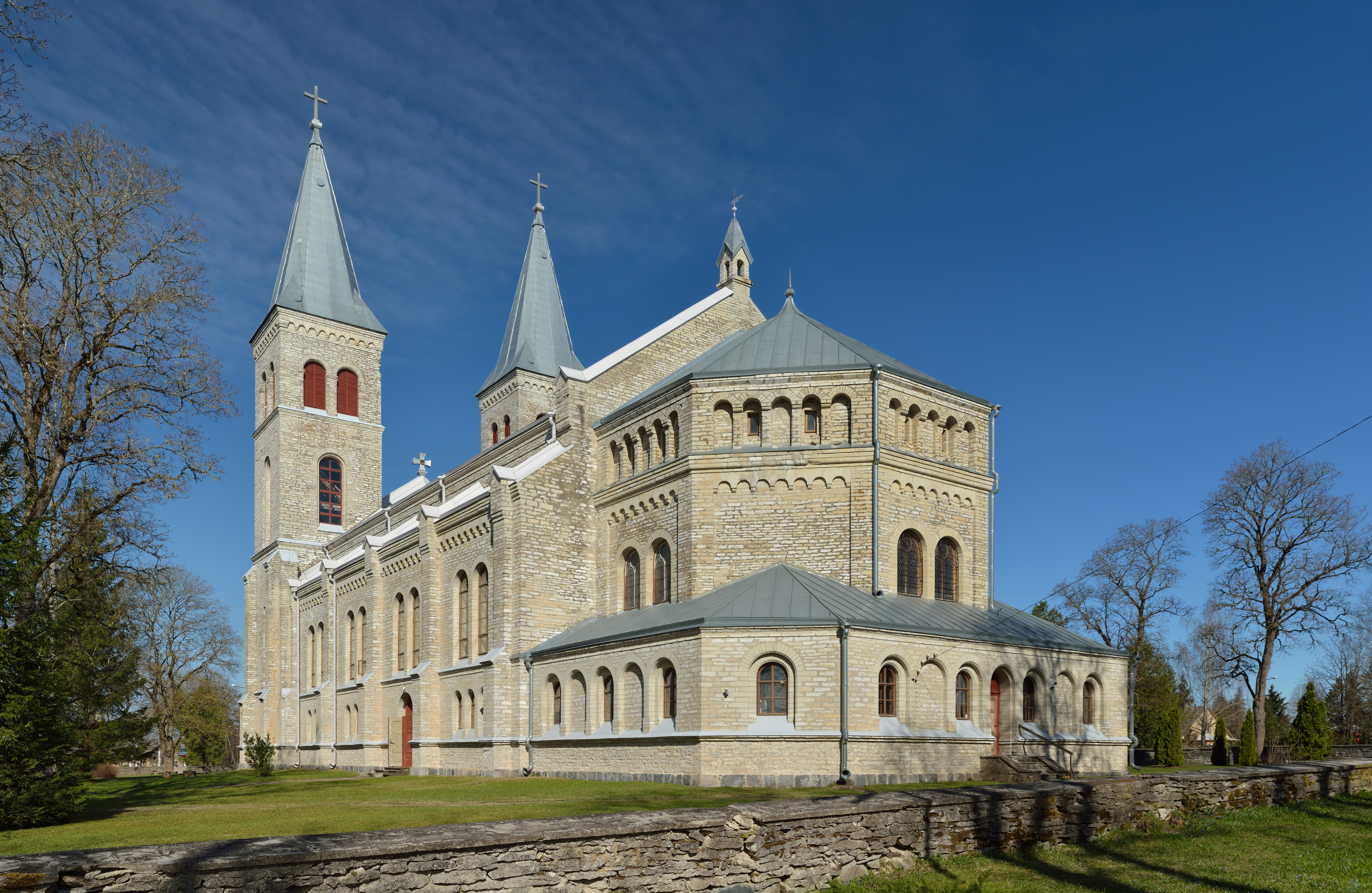
- Rapla Maria Magdalena Lutheran Church

- Flag Coat of arms

- Rapla Parish within Rapla County
- Country: Estonia
- County: Rapla County
- Administrative centre: Rapla

Area
  - Total: 859 km^{2} (332 sq mi)

Population (01.01.2019)
  - Total: 13,193
  - Density: 15.4/km^{2} (39.8/sq mi)
- ISO 3166 code: EE-668
- Website: www.rapla.ee

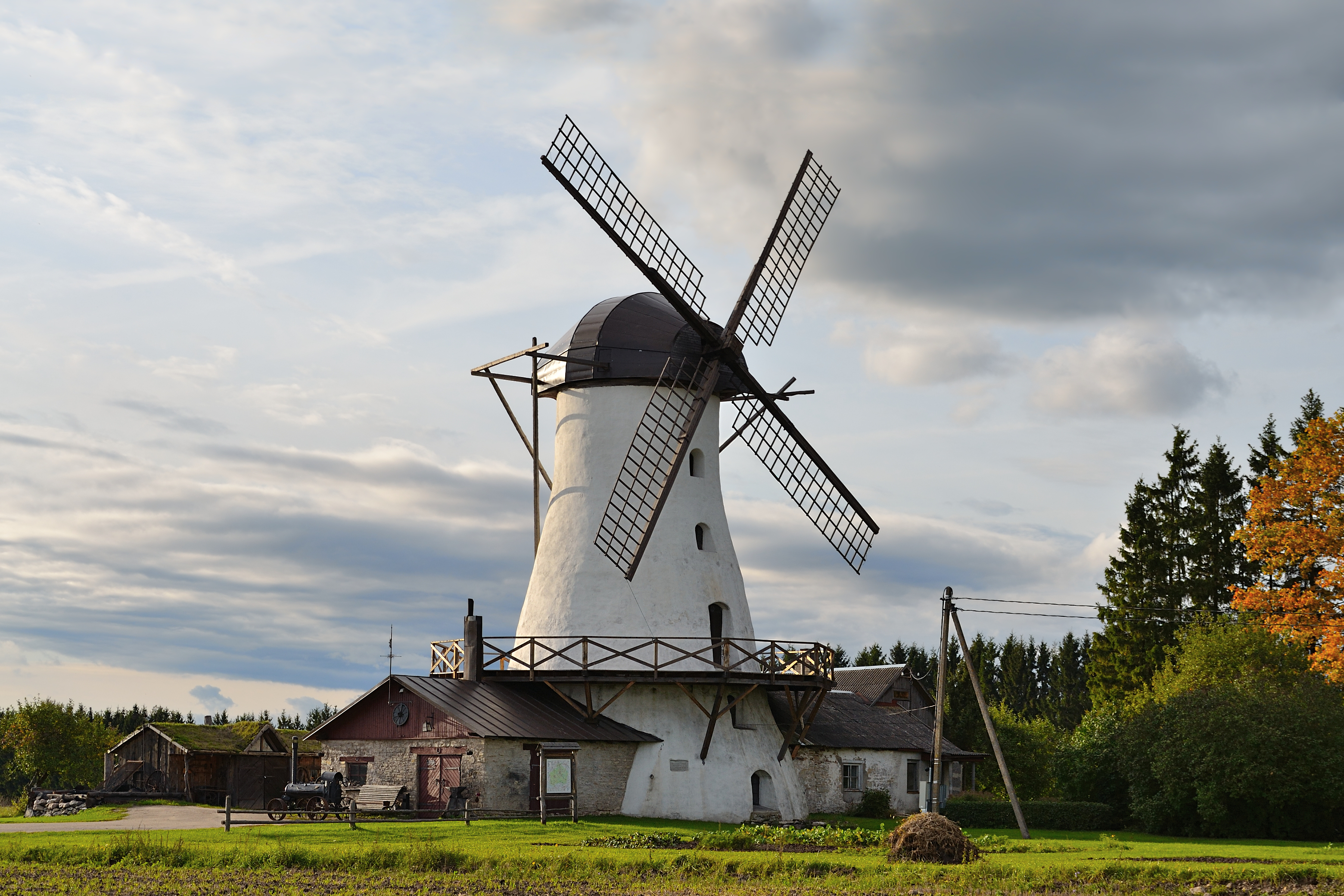
Windmill in Valtu village

Rapla Parish (Estonian: Rapla vald) is an Estonian municipality located in Rapla County. It has a population of 13,193 (as of 1 January 2019) and an area of 859 km^{2}.

== Settlements ==
Town

Rapla

Small boroughs

Alu - Hagudi - Kaiu - Kuusiku

Villages

Äherdi - Alu-Metsküla - Aranküla - Atla - Hagudi - Helda - Hõreda - Iira - Jalase - Jaluse - Järlepa - Juula - Juuru - Kabala - Kaigepere - Kalda - Kalevi - Karitsa - Kasvandu - Kelba - Keo - Kodila - Kodila-Metsküla - Koigi - Koikse - Kõrgu - Kuimetsa - Kuku - Kuusiku-Nõmme - Lipa - Lipametsa - Lipstu - Loe - Lõiuse - Lõpemetsa - Mahlamäe - Mahtra - Maidla - Mällu - Metsküla - Mõisaaseme - Nõmme - Nõmmemetsa - Nõmmküla - Oblu - Oela - Ohulepa - Oola - Orguse - Palamulla - Pirgu - Põlliku - Põlma - Purila - Purku - Raela - Raikküla - Raka - Ridaküla - Röa - Sadala - Seli - Seli-Nurme - Sikeldi - Sulupere - Suurekivi - Tamsi - Tapupere - Tolla - Toomja - Tõrma - Tuti - Ülejõe - Ummaru - Uusküla - Vahakõnnu - Vahastu - Väljataguse - Valli - Valtu - Vana-Kaiu - Vankse - Vaopere

== Religion ==
The majority of the residents of the Rapla parish 84.1% are religiously unaffiliated. Among those residents who do associate with a religion, 10.8% identify as Lutheran. The Orthodox community constitutes 1.7%, while other Christian denominations make up 1.7% of the population. A smaller segment of the population, 0.7%, follows other religions, while 1.0% of individuals did not specify their religious affiliation.

== International relations ==
=== Twin towns — sister cities ===
- Nurmijärvi, Finland

== Notable people ==
- Adam Johann von Krusenstern (1770 in Hagudi – 1846), a Baltic German, Russian admiral and explorer.
- August Topman (1882 in Lõpemetsa – 1968), composer and organist; one of the founders of Tallinn Higher Music School and taught there, 1923 to 1950
- Anton Starkopf (1889 in Röa – 1966), sculptor, one of the founders of the Pallas Art School and taught there, 1919 to 1940
- Otto Tief (1889 in Uusküla – 1976), military commander and lawyer; acting Prime Minister of Estonia for 4 days in 1944
- Uku Masing (1909 in Lipa– 1985), polymath, philosopher, theologian, poet, writer, folklorist and linguist
- Anton Raadik (1917 in Raikküla – 1999), middleweight boxer of the 1940s and 1950s
- Viktor Meister (1925 in Pirgu – 2018), agronomist and economist, member of Supreme Soviet of the Soviet Union, 1962–1966
- Raul Meel (born 1941 in Jalase), an avant-garde artist, did painting, sculpture, installation and performance art
- Liivi Erm (born 1953 in Raikküla), sport shooter and Estonian Athlete of the Year in 1976
- Andres Uibo (born 1956 in Kivi-Vigala), organist, composer and music producer
- Kairi Himanen (born 1992 in Raikküla), footballer who played over 300 games and 81 for Estonia women
