= Hagudi (village) =

Village in Estonia

Coordinates: 59°03′30″N 24°51′28″E

- Village
- Interactive map of Hagudi
- Country: Estonia
- County: Rapla County
- Parish: Rapla Parish

Population (2011 Census)
  - Total: 95
- Time zone: UTC+2 (EET)
  - Summer (DST): UTC+3 (EEST)

Hagudi (German: Haggud) is a village in Rapla Parish, Rapla County in northwestern Estonia. As of the 2011 census, the settlement's population was 95.
