= Kodila-Metsküla =

Village in Estonia

Coordinates: 59°02′52″N 24°43′14″E

- Village
- Interactive map of Kodila-Metsküla
- Country: Estonia
- County: Rapla County
- Parish: Rapla Parish
- Time zone: UTC+2 (EET)
  - Summer (DST): UTC+3 (EEST)

Kodila-Metsküla is a village in Rapla Parish, Rapla County in northwestern Estonia.
