= Helen Tobias-Duesberg =

Estonian-American composer

- Born: 11 June 1919; Suure-Jaani, Estonia
- Died: 4 February 2010 (aged 90); Savannah, Georgia, U.S.
- Education: Tallinn Conservatory
- Occupation: Composer
- Spouse: Wilhelm Duesberg
- Children: 1
- Parent(s): Rudolf Tobias, Louise Tobias (née Vilde)
- Relatives: 4 siblings, including Silvia Tobias

Helen Tobias-Duesberg (11 June 1919 – 4 February 2010) was an Estonian-American composer.

== Life ==
Helen Tobias was born in Suure-Jaani, Estonia on 11 June 1919. Tobias was the youngest daughter of Estonian composer, Rudolf Tobias, born seven months after his death. She studied music composition at the Tallinn Conservatoire, which is now known as the Estonian Academy of Music and Theatre, under Artur Kapp and Heino Eller. She graduated from the Conservatoire as an organist in 1943. She later studied at the Berlin University of Music under the composer Hermann Grabner and the organist Fritz Heitmann.

During World War II, she met her future husband, William Duesberg, a journalist who was repeatedly imprisoned for writing stories critical of Adolf Hitler. Shortly after the war, Duesberg died of a heart attack in a Stuttgart courtroom while preparing to testify against several Nazi war criminals.

Tobias-Duesberg moved to the United States from Estonia, which was then part of the Soviet Union, in 1951. She began composing music and performing at several churches in New York City. She composed chamber, vocal and symphonic pieces, the most famous of which may be Requiem, which was composed for orchestra, mixed choir and soloists. During the Civil Rights Movement, she played the organ at Friendship Baptist Church in Harlem when the Rev. Martin Luther King Jr. served as a guest preacher.

Meanwhile, she composed violin and cello sonatas, string quartets, song cycles, concertos, and a wide range of choral works. Her compositions have been performed on major concert stages in the U.S., Canada, and Europe as well as the Aspen, Ravinia and Spoleto festivals.

During a cultural backlash against classical music in the 1960s and 1970s, American conductor Leonard Bernstein described Tobias-Duesberg as a female composer who "dares to be original and musical at the same time, while all the men run around writing intellectual cacophony."

Helen Tobias-Duesberg died in Savannah, Georgia, on 4 February 2010, aged 90.

== Selected works ==
Orchestral

- Ballaade orkestrile (Ballade on Estonian and Carelian Folktunes) for orchestra

Concertante

- Concert Piece for cello and chamber orchestra

Chamber music

- Koraal-prelüüdid for violin, cello and piano
- Sextet for brass
- Sonata for violin and piano
- Sonata in G for cello and piano
- String Quartet No. 2
- Trio for violin, flute and piano
- Trio in C for violin, viola (or cello) and piano

Piano

- Classical Suite
- Parafraas eesti rahvalaulude viisidele (Prelude on Estonian Folksongs)
- 4 Preludes

Vocal

- Sa tulid nagu päikene for voice and piano

Choral

- Missa brevis for mixed chorus and keyboard accompaniment
- Psalm 102 for mixed chorus and organ
- Requiem for female chorus and keyboard accompaniment
- Vaimulik õhtu-muusika (Sacred Evening Service) for mixed chorus, baritone, soprano and organ
