= Alu, Estonia =

Borough in Estonia

Alu
- Small borough
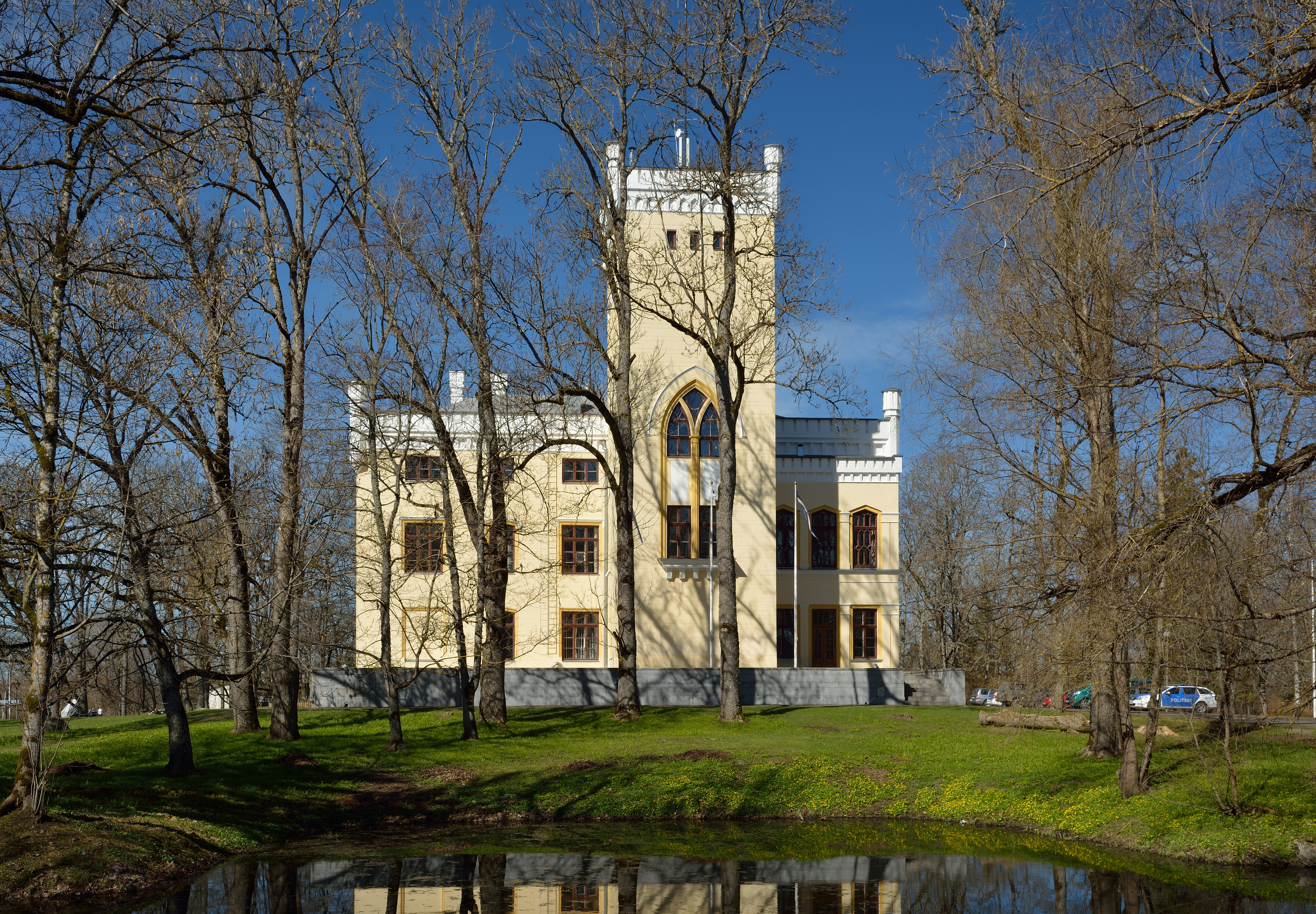
- Alu Manor

- Location in Estonia
- Coordinates: 59°01′25″N 24°45′51″E
- Country: Estonia
- County: Rapla County
- Municipality: Rapla Parish
- First mentioned: 1241

Population
  - Total: c. 950

Alu is a small borough (Estonian: alevik) in Rapla Parish, Rapla County, Estonia. It is located about 3 km (2 mi) northwest of the town of Rapla. Alu has a population of c. 950.

Alu was first mentioned in 1241 as Alafæ village in the Danish Census Book.

== Alu manor ==
Alu Manor was first mentioned in 1409 as Alven (later known as Allo). The present main building, designed by Paul Friedrich Wilhelm Alisch, is one of the best examples of Neo-Gothic style in Estonia. The building is surrounded by an 11 ha park with seven ponds. After the dispossession from 1923 to 1955 a local grammar school operated in the main building. Since 1999 it houses a training centre for the Estonian Defence League.

== Notable people ==
- Magnus Gabriel Bernhard von Brevern (1825–1878), Baltic German military commander who served under the Russian Empire at the Russo-Turkish War.
- Priit Võigemast (born 1980), Estonian film, television and stage actor

== See also ==
- List of palaces and manor houses in Estonia
