= Felix Moor =

Estonian actor and speech teacher

Felix Moor (12 April 1903, Suure-Jaani – 15 May 1955, Tallinn) was an Estonian actor and speech teacher. He was the first Estonian radio reporter.

1924 he finished Estonian Drama Studio Theatre school (Estonian: Draamastuudio teatrikool).

1925-1927 he was actor at Drama Studio Theatre. 1927-1944 he was Estonian Radio reporter.

After World War II he was related to the first live broadcasts at Estonia Radio.
