= Valtu =

Village in Estonia

- Village
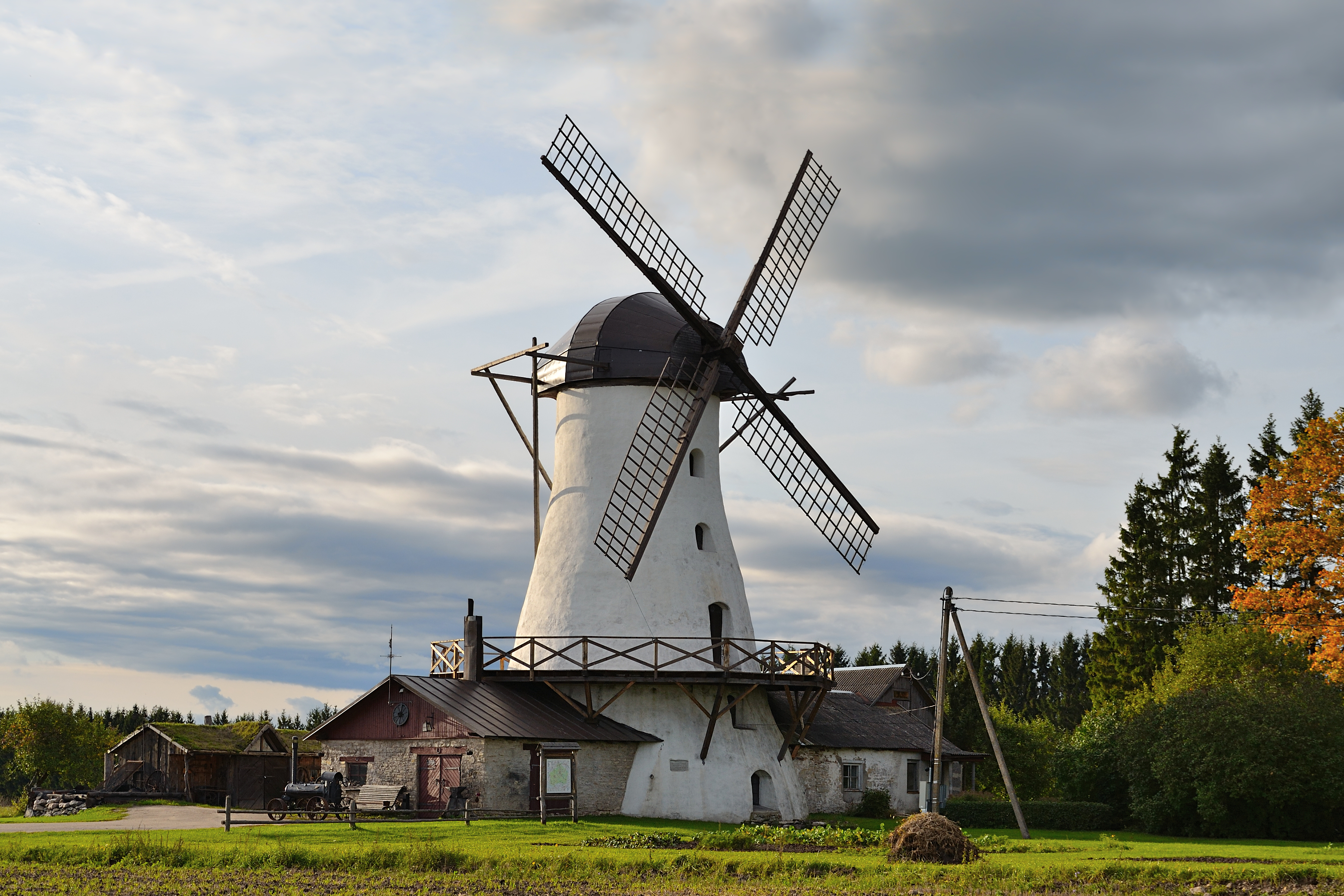
- Windmill in Valtu village

- Location within Estonia
- Coordinates: 58°59′N 24°51′E
- Country: Estonia
- County: Rapla County
- Parish: Rapla Parish

Population (2011)
  - Total: 218
- Time zone: UTC+2 (EET)
  - Summer (DST): UTC+3 (EEST)

Valtu (German: Waldau) is a village in Rapla Parish, Rapla County in northwestern Estonia.

Valtu Manor (in Swedish Waldau, in Estonian Valtu mõis) is a ruined and partially rebuilt manor in Valtu. The first record of the manor was in 1412. From 1588-1828 the Tiesenhausen family owned the manor and it was later owned by families named Stackelberg, Ungern von Sternberg, and Meidel. During this time it was considered to be a work of classic Estonian architecture.

The main building was burned during the Revolution of 1905. Its ruins were destroyed, but several outbuildings have been restored. A Dutch windmill built about 1815 on the site and the Manor are officially listed as part of Estonia's cultural heritage.
