= Tuti, Estonia =

Village in Estonia

Coordinates: 59°00′N 24°46′E

Tuti
- Village
- Interactive map of Tuti
- Country: Estonia
- County: Rapla County
- Parish: Rapla Parish
- Time zone: UTC+2 (EET)
  - Summer (DST): UTC+3 (EEST)

Tuti is a village in Rapla Parish, Rapla County in northwestern Estonia.
