= Kalevi, Estonia =

Village in Estonia

Coordinates: 59°02′04″N 24°46′30″E

Kalevi
- Village
- A stone grave in Kalevi
- Interactive map of Kalevi
- Country: Estonia
- County: Rapla County
- Parish: Rapla Parish
- Time zone: UTC+2 (EET)
  - Summer (DST): UTC+3 (EEST)

Kalevi is a village in Rapla Parish, Rapla County in northwestern Estonia. Its estimated population is about 75 residents as of the 2021 census.
