= Eugen Kapp =

Estonian composer (1908–1996)

- Born: 26 May [O.S. 13 May] 1908; Astrakhan, Russian Empire
- Died: October 29, 1996 (aged 88); Tallinn, Estonia
- Occupations: Composer; teacher

Eugen Kapp (Note: Estonian: Eugen Kapp; Russian: Эуген Артурович Капп, romanized: Eugen Arturovich Kapp) (26 May [O.S. 13 May] 1908 – 29 October 1996) was an Estonian composer and music educator. Characterized by simple harmonies, march rhythms and an appealing melodic style, his music is reflective upon the musical ideas favoured by the Stalinist regime of the 1940s and 1950s. He is best remembered today for his contribution to Russian opera.

Born in Astrakhan, in the Astrakhan Governorate of the Russian Empire, Kapp was the son of Artur Kapp, also a composer and teacher. His first cousin was the composer, organist and music teacher Villem Kapp. Kapp studied under his father at the Tallinn Conservatory and graduated from there in 1931. Four years later he joined the adjunct faculty at the Conservatory where he taught music theory and composition. He won the Stalin Prize in 1946 for his opera Tasuleegid (‘Fire of Revenge’). In 1947 he was appointed a full professor at the Conservatory, acting as rector from 1952 to 1964. Several of Kapp's students, such as Eino Tamberg, went on to have successful careers. From 1948 to 1965, Kapp served as chairman of the Estonian Composers' Union. In 1950 he was awarded a Stalin Prize for another opera, Vabaduse laulik ("Bard of Freedom"), followed by a third prize in 1952 for the ballet Kalevipoeg. Kapp died in Tallinn, Estonia in 1996.

== Operas ==
- Tasuleegid (Flames of Revenge) (1945)
- Vabaduse laulik (1950)
- Talvemuinasjutt (1959)
- Tabamatu (1961)
- Assol (1965)
- Rembrandt (1975)
- An Unseen Wonder (1983)

== Awards ==
- People's Artist of the USSR
- Three Stalin Prizes second degree (1946, 1949, 1952)
