= Suure-Jaani =

Town in Estonia

- Town
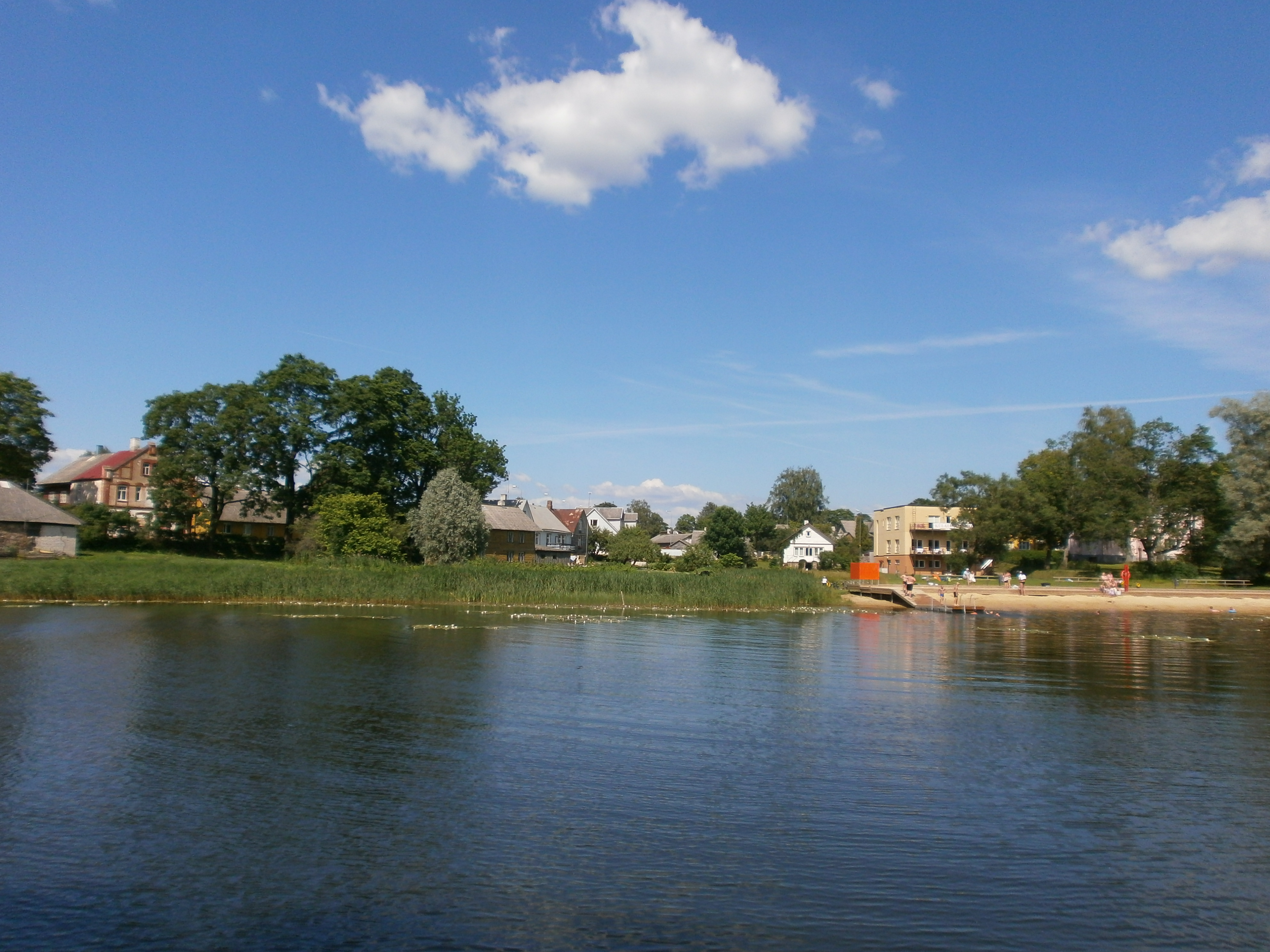

- Location in Estonia
- Coordinates: 58°32′N 25°28′E
- Country: Estonia
- County: Viljandi County
- Municipality: Põhja-Sakala Parish

Area
  - Total: 2.22 km^{2} (0.86 sq mi)

Population (2024)
  - Total: 1,168
  - Rank: 43rd
- Time zone: UTC+2 (EET)
  - Summer (DST): UTC+3 (EEST)

Suure-Jaani is a town in the northern part of the county of Viljandimaa in Põhja-Sakala rural municipality, 25 kilometres north of the town of Viljandi. Until 2017, Suure-Jaani was the administrative centre of Suure-Jaani rural municipality.

== History ==
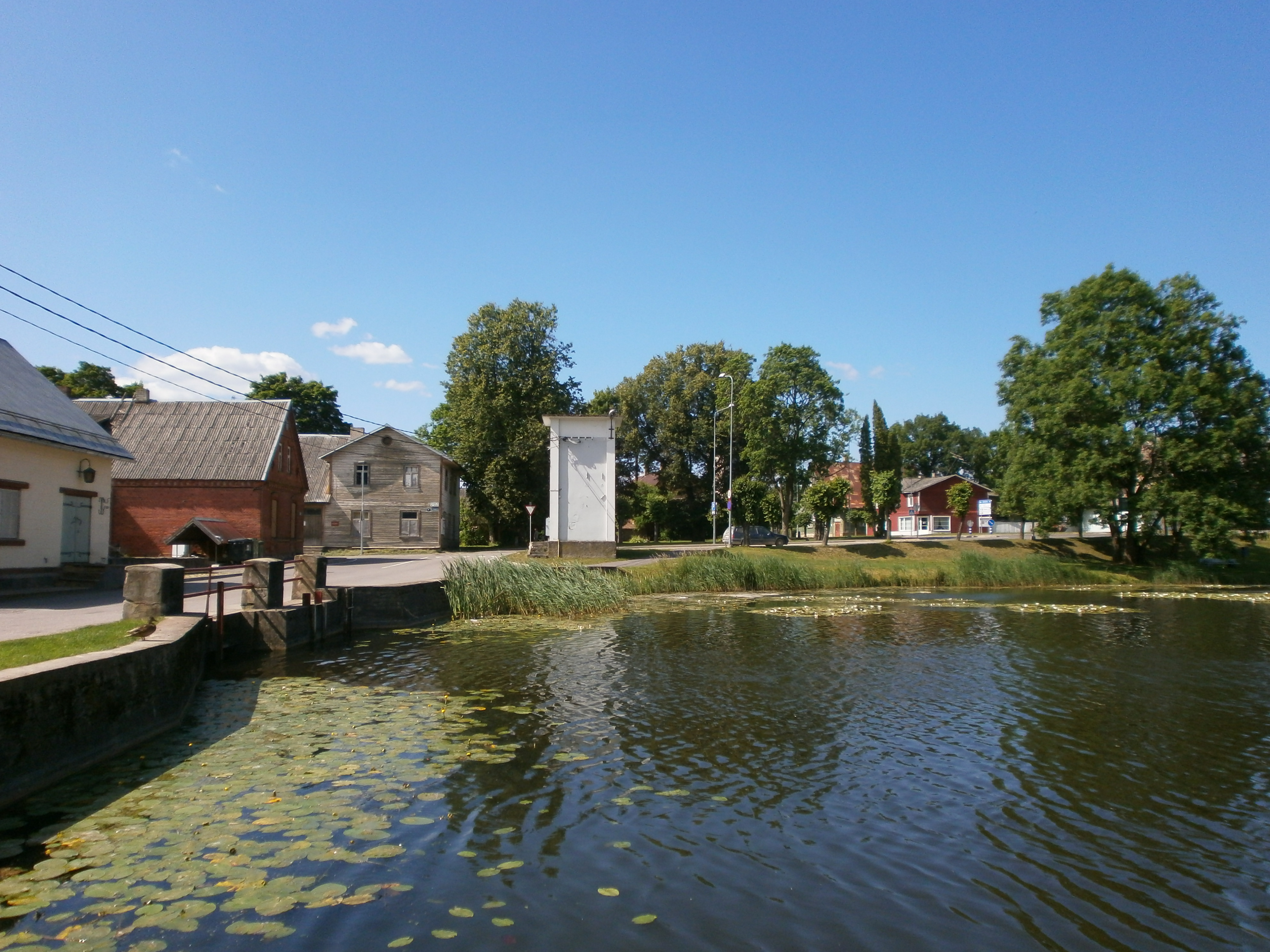
Suure-Jaani lake

The oldest archaeological findings from the area date back to the 6th millennium B.C. At the end of the 12th century A.D., the Lehola hill fort of ancient Estonians was built at a location (now known as Lõhavere) approximately two kilometres north-east of the present town border. The hill fort was the centre of the northernmost district (Estonian: kihelkond) in the historical Estonian county of Sakala and also one of the centres of Estonians' fight against the conquest of German Sword Brethren in the 13th century, including in the Battle of Lehola. Not much except the hill remains of it but the place (known in Estonian also as Lembitu linnamägi) is still visited as a tourist attraction. 2/3 of the hill-fort have been excavated archaeologically.

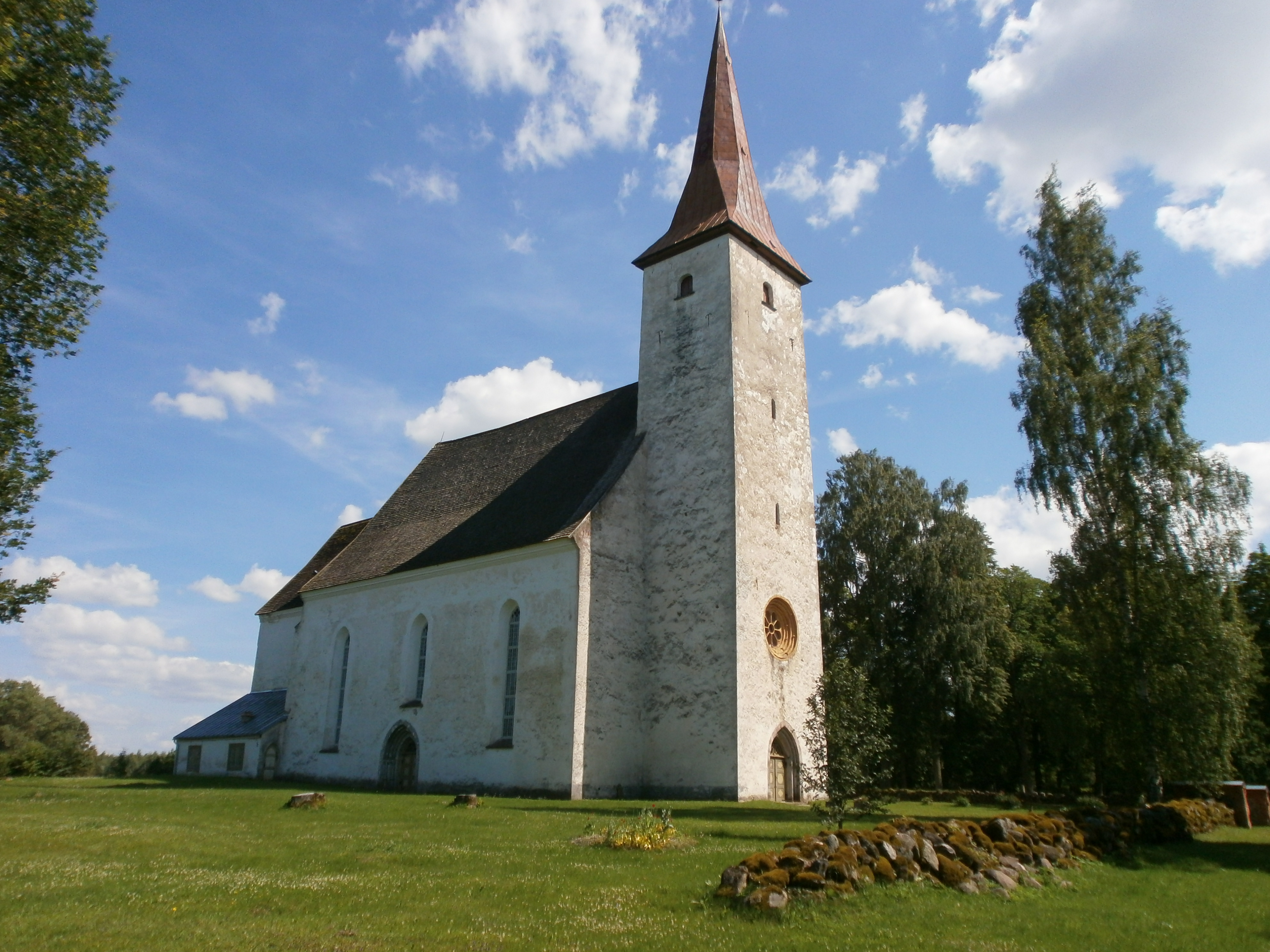
The Church of St. John the Evangelist

The locality of Suure-Jaani was initially called Wallola (or "Valle"), first recorded in 1423(?). The town began to develop around the (now Lutheran) Church of Great Saint John the Evangelist (Groß Sankt Johannis in German), built before the year 1300. There is a Lutheran cemetery near the church. The church was severely damaged during the Livonian War (1558–1582) and the Great Northern War (1700–1721), particularly the latter (the church was burnt down in 1703 and the restoration was completed only in 1767). The present name, "Suure-Jaani" (literally meaning "Great John's"), which came into widespread use for the locality only in the 1880s, when it developed into a village in its own right, is an Estonian derivative from the German name of the church. Until then, the name "Suure-Jaani" was used only for the church as well as its immediate surroundings (the church estate), while other areas of the present town were separate villages: Valula (or Wallola; the southern part of the present town of Suure-Jaani), Nuutre (the eastern part) and Päraküla (or Perraküla; the north-western part; one part of the traditional Päraküla still being a separate village nowadays).

During centuries, Suure-Jaani was one of the centres of Suure-Jaani parish (which was in 1629–1721 administratively a part of Swedish Livonia, in 1721–1918 a part of the Governorate of Livonia and as from 1918 a part of the Republic of Estonia) and, since the end of the 19th century, also the cultural and commercial centre of the parish region.

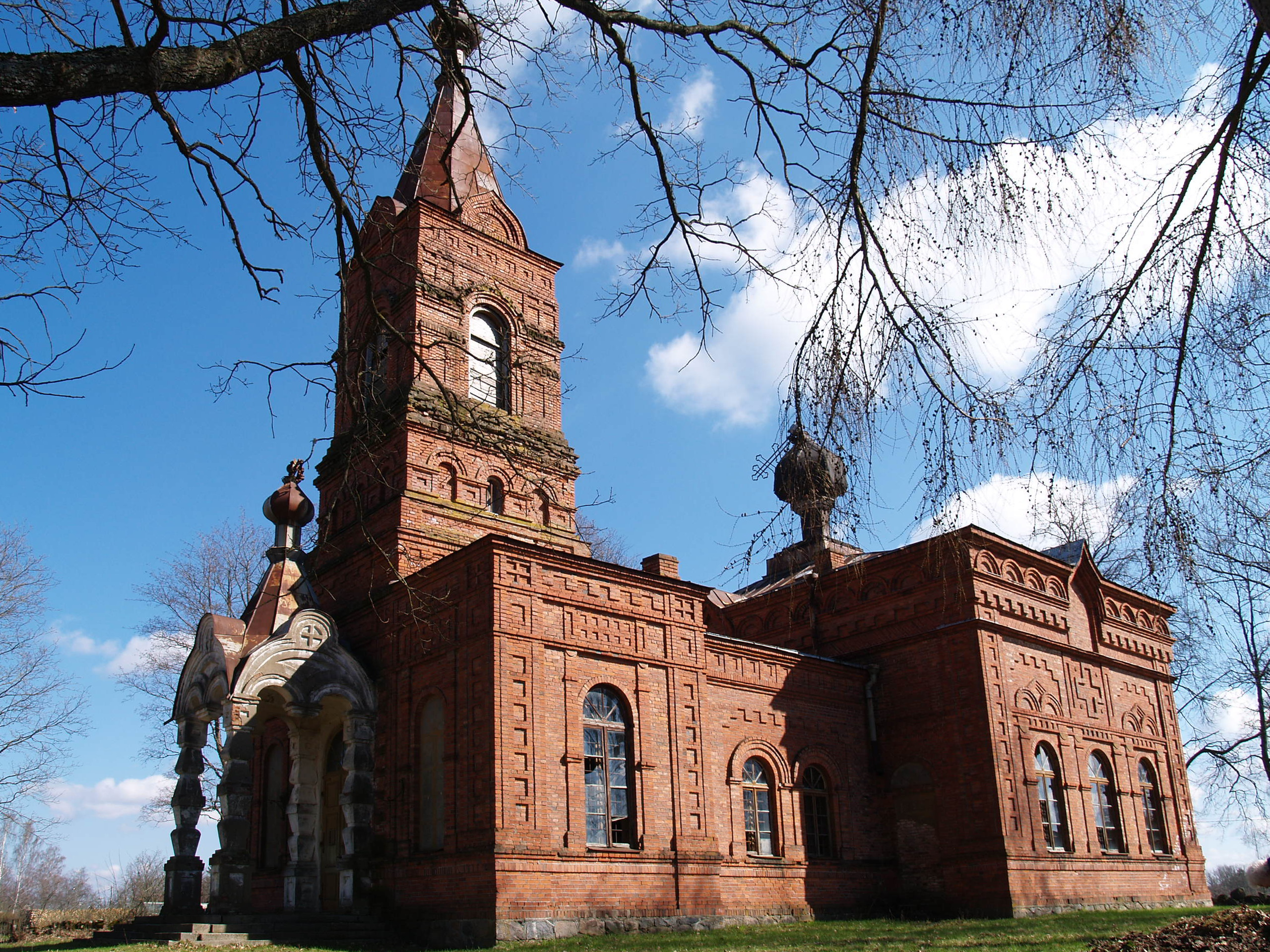
Suure-Jaani Orthodox Church

In 1906–1908, Sts. Peter and Paul Orthodox Church was built at the village of Valula (now Suure-Jaani). The Orthodox congregation had already been established in the nearby village of Olustvere in 1847. In 1911, an Orthodox cemetery was established at Valula (now Suure-Jaani), replacing the former Orthodox cemetery, which was located in the village of Reegoldi near Olustvere. As from 1989 Sts. Peter and Paul Church was not used for services for a couple of decades but is being restored since 2018 and is being used, since the late 2010s, for Orthodox religious services again.

In 1924, Suure-Jaani was granted the rights of a town (Estonian: alev) and in 1938, it was granted city rights.

In 1950–1959, Suure-Jaani was the capital of Suure-Jaani District (of the Estonian SSR). The 1950s also marked the all-time peak number (approximately 1700) in the population of the town. During the administrative reform in 1960, Suure-Jaani District was dissolved and became part of the larger Viljandi District (now the county of Viljandimaa).

In 2005, a new Suure-Jaani rural municipality was formed by the town of Suure-Jaani (which had been a separate urban municipality until then), the former separate Suure-Jaani rural municipality and Olustvere and Vastemõisa rural municipalities. Therefore, the town is not a separate municipality any more but retains its city rights.

On 21 October 2017, Suure-Jaani rural municipality united with the city of Võhma and the Kõo and Kõpu rural municipalities to form the new Põhja-Sakala rural municipality.

== Geography ==
Suure-Jaani is situated in Sakala Upland, offering picturesque views with its park, two artificial lakes and church in the centre of the town.

== Transport ==
Due to its small size, Suure-Jaani has no urban transport. The town has a bus stop for intercity lines. The nearest railway station is at Olustvere (5 km). The nearest towns are Võhma (12 km), Viljandi (25 km), Põltsamaa (28 km) and Vändra (32 km). The distance of Suure-Jaani from Tallinn, the capital of Estonia, is 143 km.

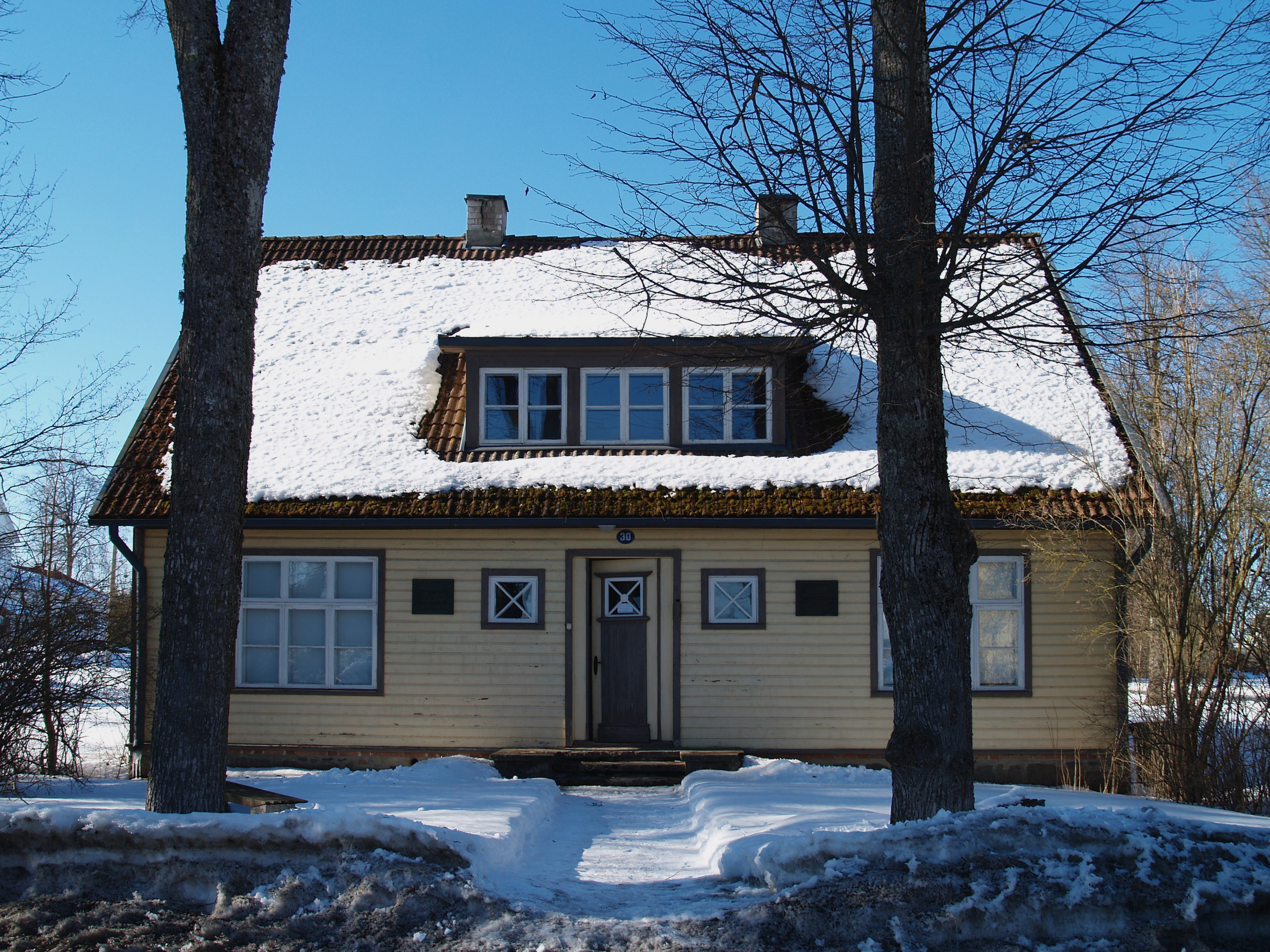
Home museum of the Kapp family

== Culture ==
During the Estonian national awakening period in the 19th century, Suure-Jaani parish was one of the regional centres of educational, cultural and social life (largely as a result of the efforts of schoolmaster and musician Joosep Kapp and also e.g. as the parish of origin of the first Estonian professional painter Johann Köler, who both actively contributed to the development and promotion of Estonian culture).

Presently, Suure-Jaani hosts the Suure-Jaani Music Festival, an annual summer festival of classical music started in 1998, dedicated to the Kapp family of composers. Suure-Jaani is also the place of establishment of the International Artur Kapp Society, a non-profit foundation for promoting the works and life of composer Artur Kapp and other composers related to Suure-Jaani, such as Mart Saar.

== Places of interest ==
- Church of Great Saint John the Evangelist
- Home museum of the Kapp family of composers and musicians
- Monument of the Estonian War of Independence (depicting Lembitu of Lehola)
- Lehola hill fort (Lembitu linnamägi) of ancient Estonians at Lõhavere (nearby, in Põhja-Sakala rural municipality)
- Home museum of composer Mart Saar at Hüpassaare (in Põhja-Sakala rural municipality)
- Home museum of painter Johann Köler at Lubjassaare farm (Ivaski village in Põhja-Sakala rural municipality)
- Soomaa National Park (20–30 km south-west of Suure-Jaani)

== Notable people ==
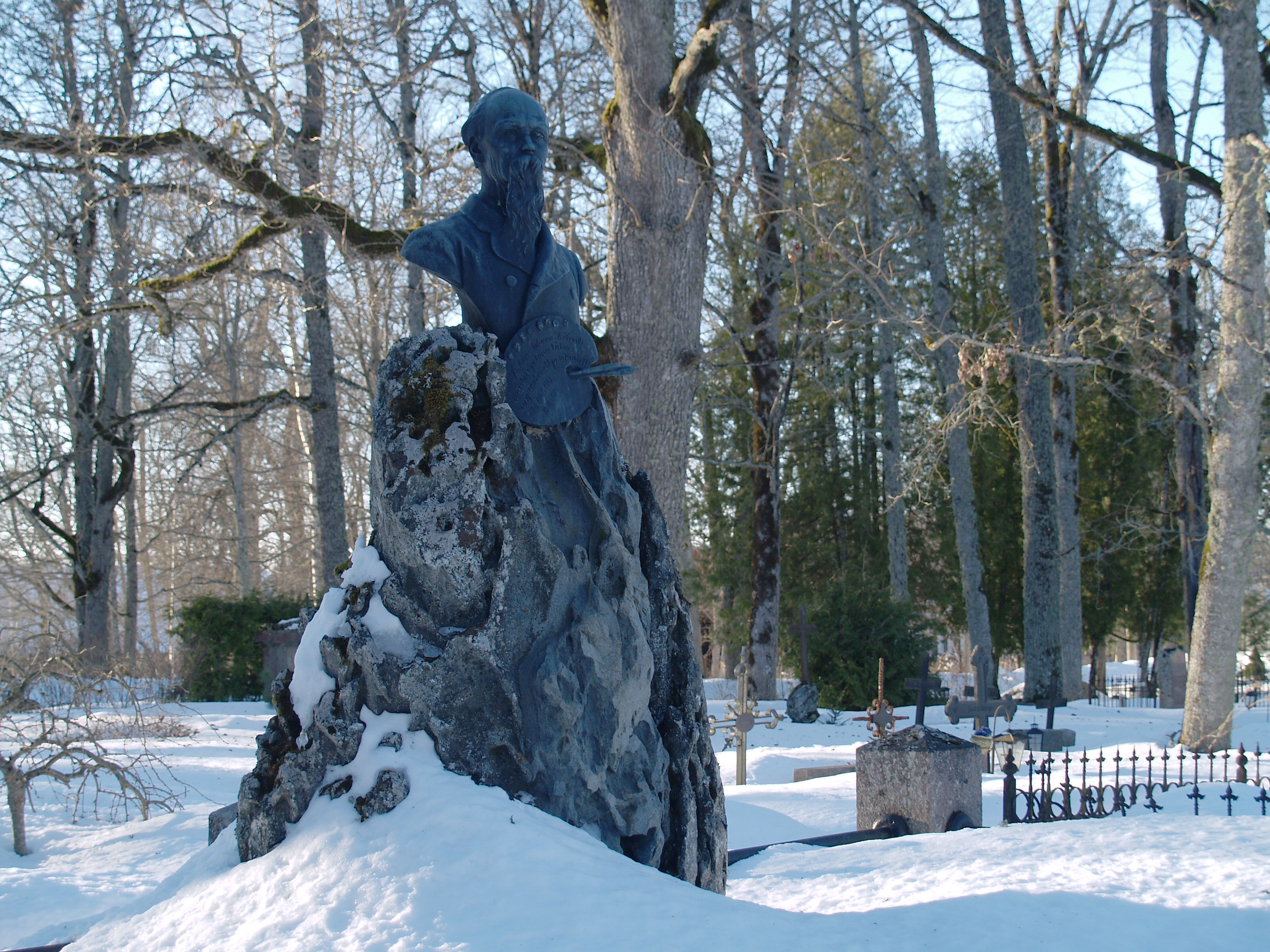
Grave monument of painter Johann Köler, bust created by Amandus Adamson.

- Johann Köler (1826–1899), leader of Estonian national awakening and a painter
- Ado Johanson (1874–1932), agronomist and politician
- Artur Kapp (1878–1952), composer
- Tõnis Kint (1896–1991), politician, Estonian Prime Minister and President in exile in 1970–1990
- Albert Kivikas (1898–1978), writer and journalist.
- Paul Kondas (1900–1985), painter
- Felix Moor (1903–1955), the first Estonian radio reporter
- Villem Kapp (1913–1964), composer, organist and music teacher.
- Roman Toi (1916–2018), conductor and composer, melodic, lyrical and melancholic in style
- Helen Tobias-Duesberg (1919–2010), composer, she wrote a wide range of choral works.
- Herman Simm (born 1947), convicted traitor and Russian spy.
- Priit Toobal (born 1983), former politician, found guilty of instigating unauthorized surveillance

== See also ==
- Suure-Jaani United
