= Riho Päts =

Estonian composer

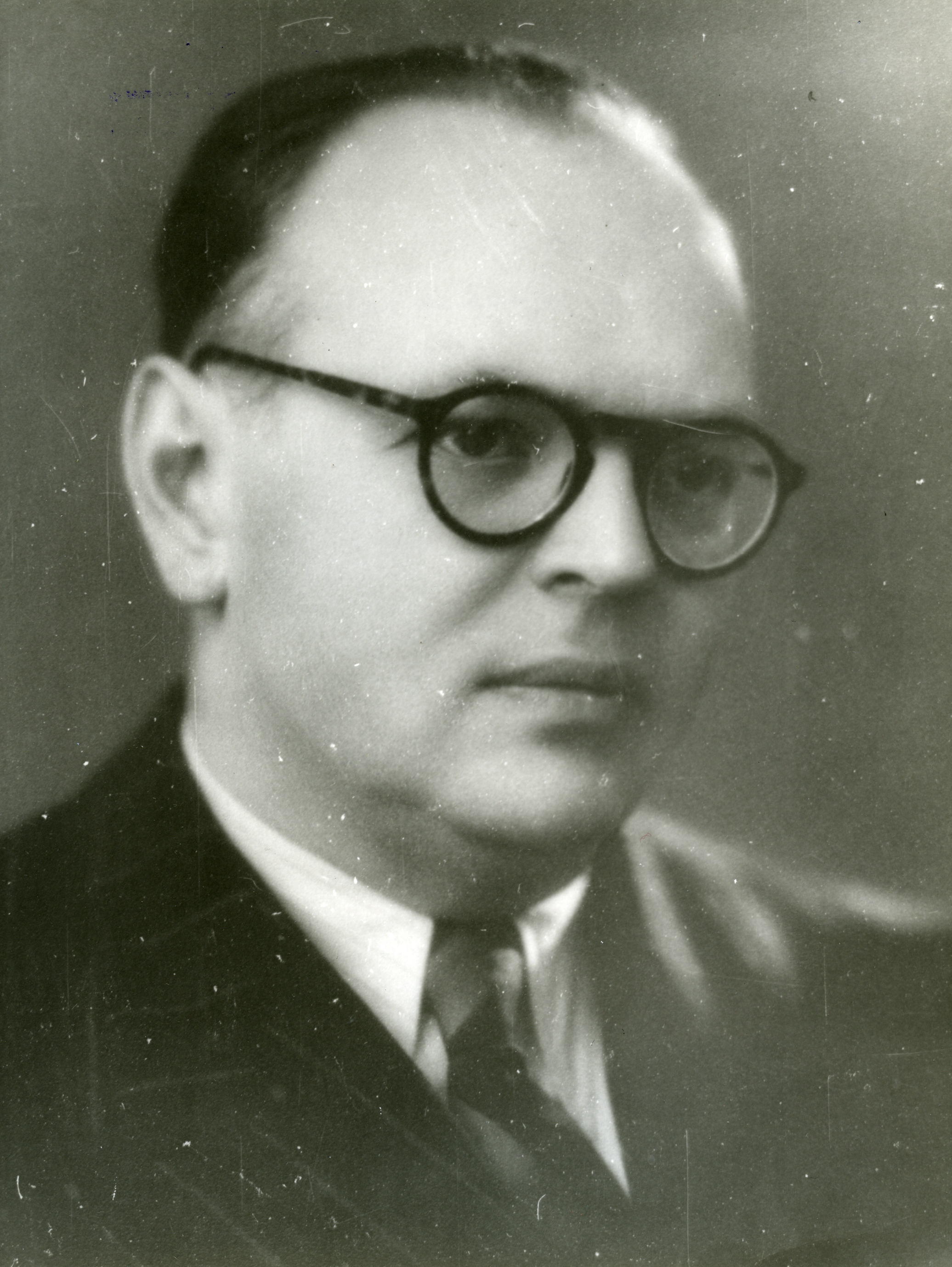
Riho Päts

Riho Päts (26 June 1899, Tartu - 15 January 1977, Tallinn) was an Estonian composer, choir director, music journalist and music teacher.
