= August Topman =

Estonian conductor and composer

August Topman (10 July 1882 Lõpemetsa – 8 September 1968 Tallinn) was an Estonian composer, organist, conductor.

1904–1919, he was an organist in St. John's Church.

He was one of the founders of Tallinn Higher Music School (established in 1919). 1923–1950, he was the teacher of music theory and organ at Tallinn Higher Music School.

1944–1949, he was a member of Estonian Composers' Union.

In 1957, he was given the honorary title: Estonian SSR Honoured Worker in Arts.

== Works ==
- "In the Evening" (variations for piano, 1911)
- "Requiem" (1932)
