= Rapla County =

County of Estonia

Rapla County Raplamaa
- County
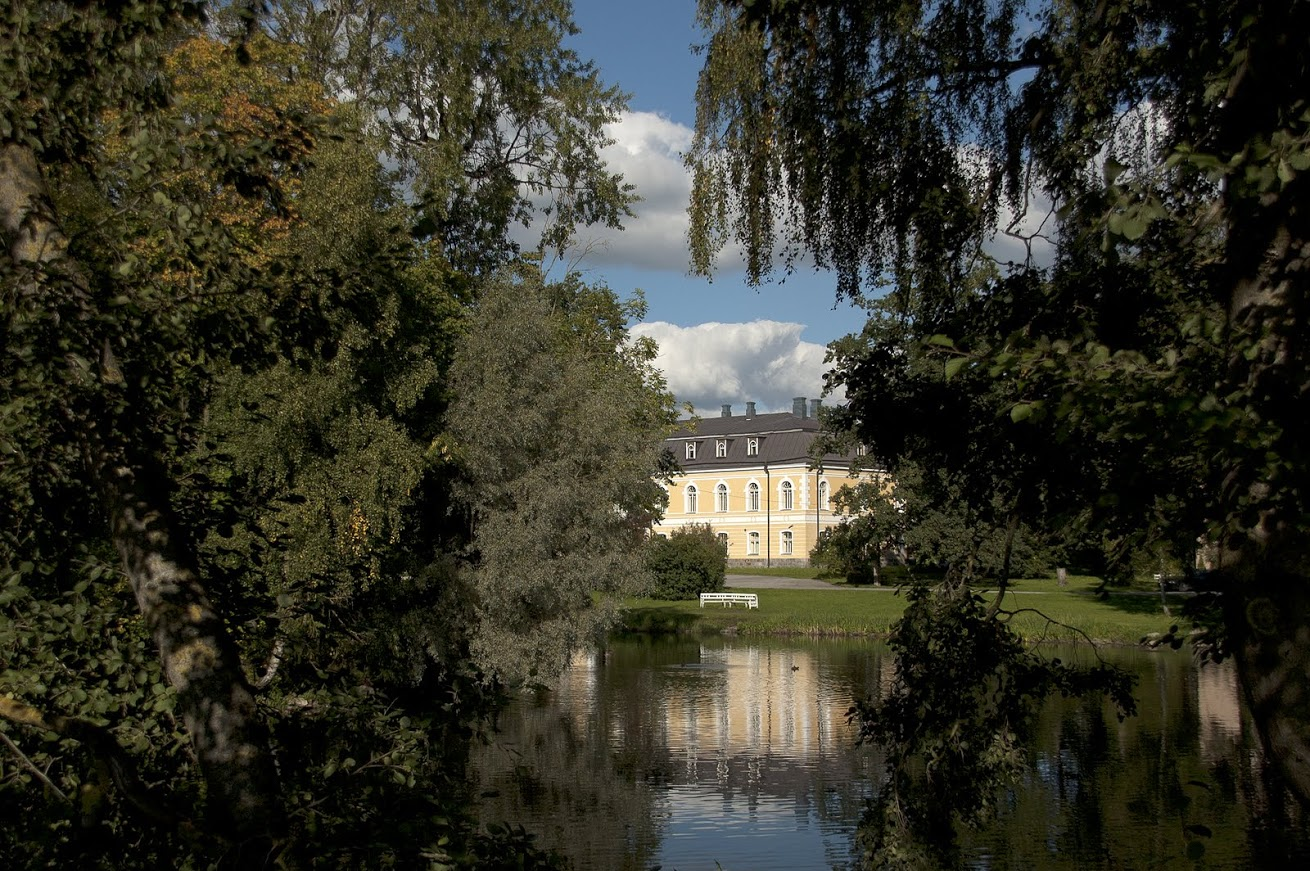

- Flag Coat of arms

- Coordinates: 59°15′N 26°20′E
- Country: Estonia
- Capital: Rapla

Area
  - Total: 2,979.7 km^{2} (1,150.5 sq mi)

Population (2022)
  - Total: 33,529
  - Rank: 7th
  - Density: 11.252/km^{2} (29.144/sq mi)

Ethnicity
  - Estonians: 94%
  - other: 6%

GDP
  - Total: €540 million (2022)
  - Per capita: €15,985 (2022)
- ISO 3166 code: EE-71
- Vehicle registration: L

Rapla County (Estonian: Rapla maakond or Raplamaa) is one of the fifteen counties of Estonia. It is located in the northwestern part of the country and borders Järva County to the east, Pärnu County to the south, Lääne County to the west, and Harju County to the north. In 2022 Rapla County had a population of 33,529, constituting 2.5% of the total population of Estonia.

== History ==
The first written records of Rapla date back to the 1241 Danish census (Liber Census Daniae).

=== County government ===
Until 2017, the County Government (Estonian: maavalitsus) was led by a governor (Estonian: maavanem), who was appointed by the Government of Estonia for a term of five years. Since 2015, the governor position has been held by Tõnis Blank.

== Municipalities ==
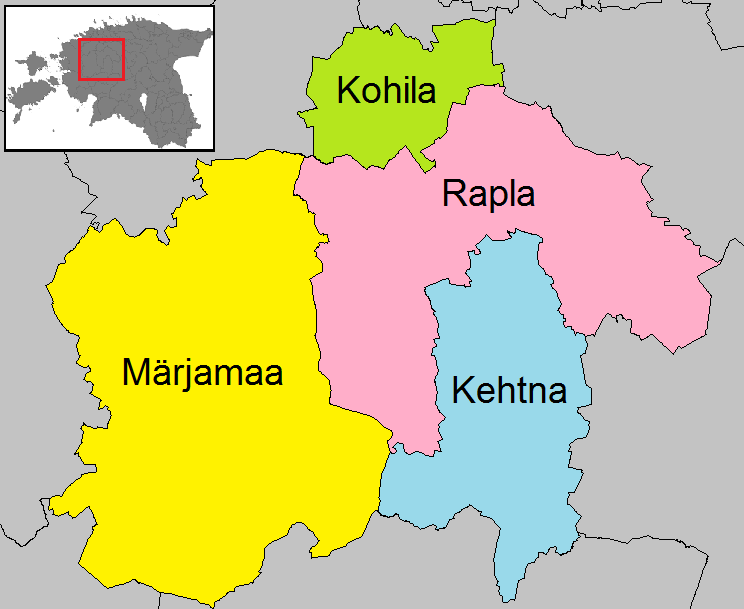
Municipalities of Rapla County after 2017 administrative reform

The county is subdivided into municipalities. There are 4 rural municipalities (Estonian: vallad 'parishes') in Rapla County:

Rank	Municipality	Type	Population (2018)	Area km^{2}	Density
1	Kehtna Parish	Rural	5,605	512	10.9
2	Kohila Parish	Rural	7,096	230	30.9
3	Märjamaa Parish	Rural	7,739	1,174	6.6
4	Rapla Parish	Rural	13,334	849	15.7

== Religion ==
The congregations of the Estonian Evangelical Lutheran Church in the county are Hageri St. Lambertus, Juuru St.Michael's, Järvakandi St. Paul's, Märjamaa of Blessed Virgin Mary, Rapla Mary Magdalene's, Vahastu and Vigala of Blessed Virgin Mary.

The Orthodox congregations in the county include the Ascension of the Lord congregation in Kohila rural municipality, the Holy Trinity congregation in Lelle and the St. John the Baptist congregation in Velise, which are under the administration of the Estonian Apostolic Orthodox Church.

The Baptist congregations operate in Rapla and Märjamaa and the Adventist congregations operate in Rapla and Valgu. There is a congregation of Moravian Church in Hageri. There is a Kingdom Hall of Jehovah's Witnesses in the county.

Religious affiliations in Rapla County, census 2000–2021*
Religion	2000		2011		2021	
Religion	Number	%	Number	%	Number	%
Christianity	7,747	26.1	5,144	17.6	4,370	15.7
—Orthodox Christians	775	2.6	912	3.1	740	2.7
—Lutherans	6,439	21.7	3,761	12.8	2,980	10.7
—Catholics	68	0.2	50	0.1	240	0.8
—Baptists	232	0.7	155	0.5	140	0.5
—Jehovah's Witnesses	58	0.1	72	0.2	80	0.2
—Pentecostals	95	0.2	37	0.1	30	0.1
—Old Believers	4	0.01	7	0.01	-	-
—Methodists	36	0.1	13	0.02	-	-
—Adventists	40	0.1	29	0.1	-	-
—Other Christians	-		108	0.3	160	0.55
Islam	9	0.02	11	0.02	-	-
Buddhism	-	-	15	0.02	60	0.2
Other religions**	177	0.6	232	0.8	340	1.2
No religion	11,739	39.6	19,695	67.5	19,660	70.6
Not stated***	9,860	33.2	4,091	14.0	3,330	11.9
Total population*	29,632		29,187		27,820	
*The censuses of Estonia count the religious affiliations of the population older than 15 years of age. ".

== Geography ==
Natural resources found in Rapla county include limestone, dolomite, peat, and clay.

== Miscellaneous topics ==
The church of Rapla was built in 1901. However, much of the interior dates back to several hundred years earlier and is of high structural quality and historical value. In the churchyard there are several crosses remaining from the 17th century.

== Images ==
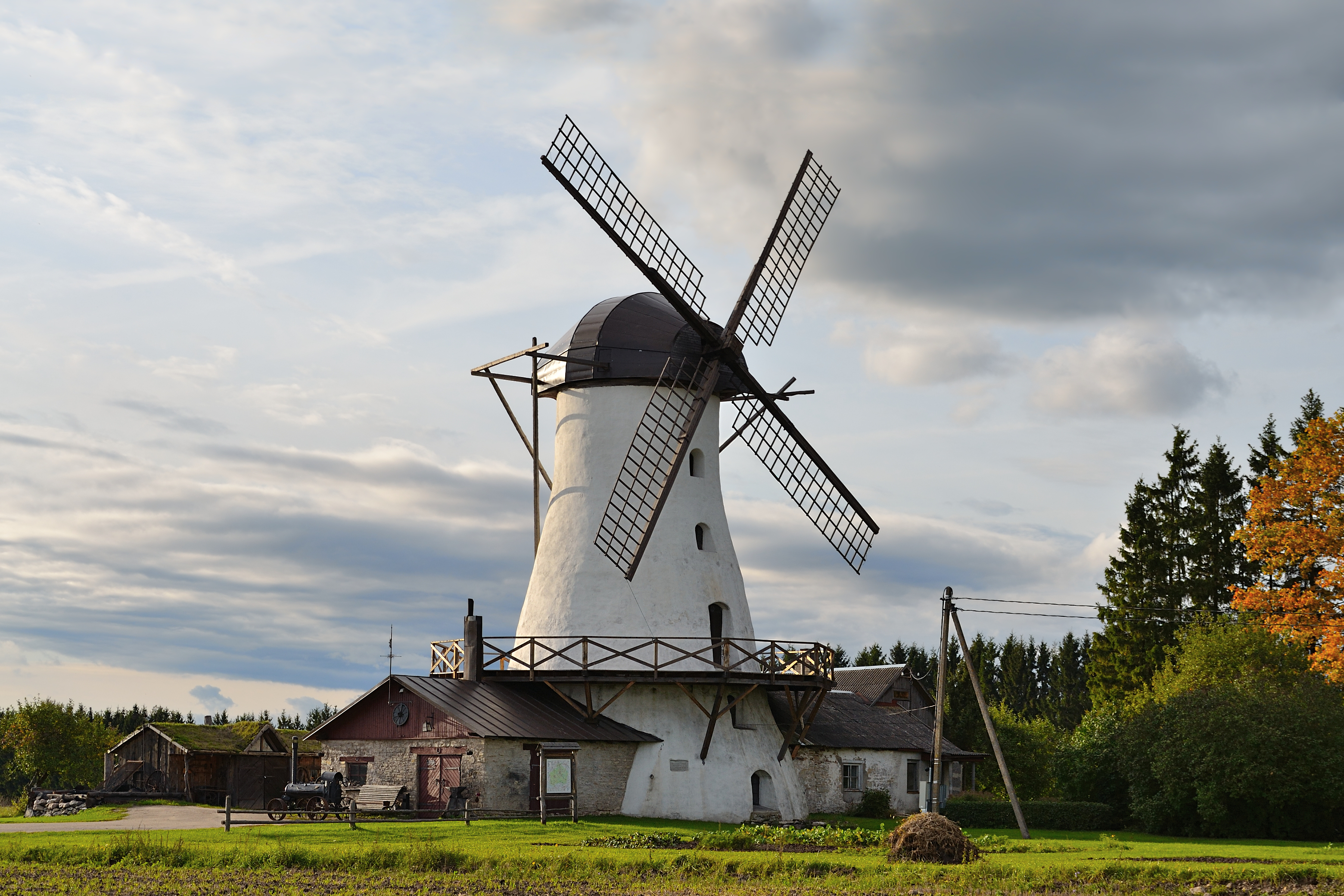
Puraviku windmill at Valtu manor

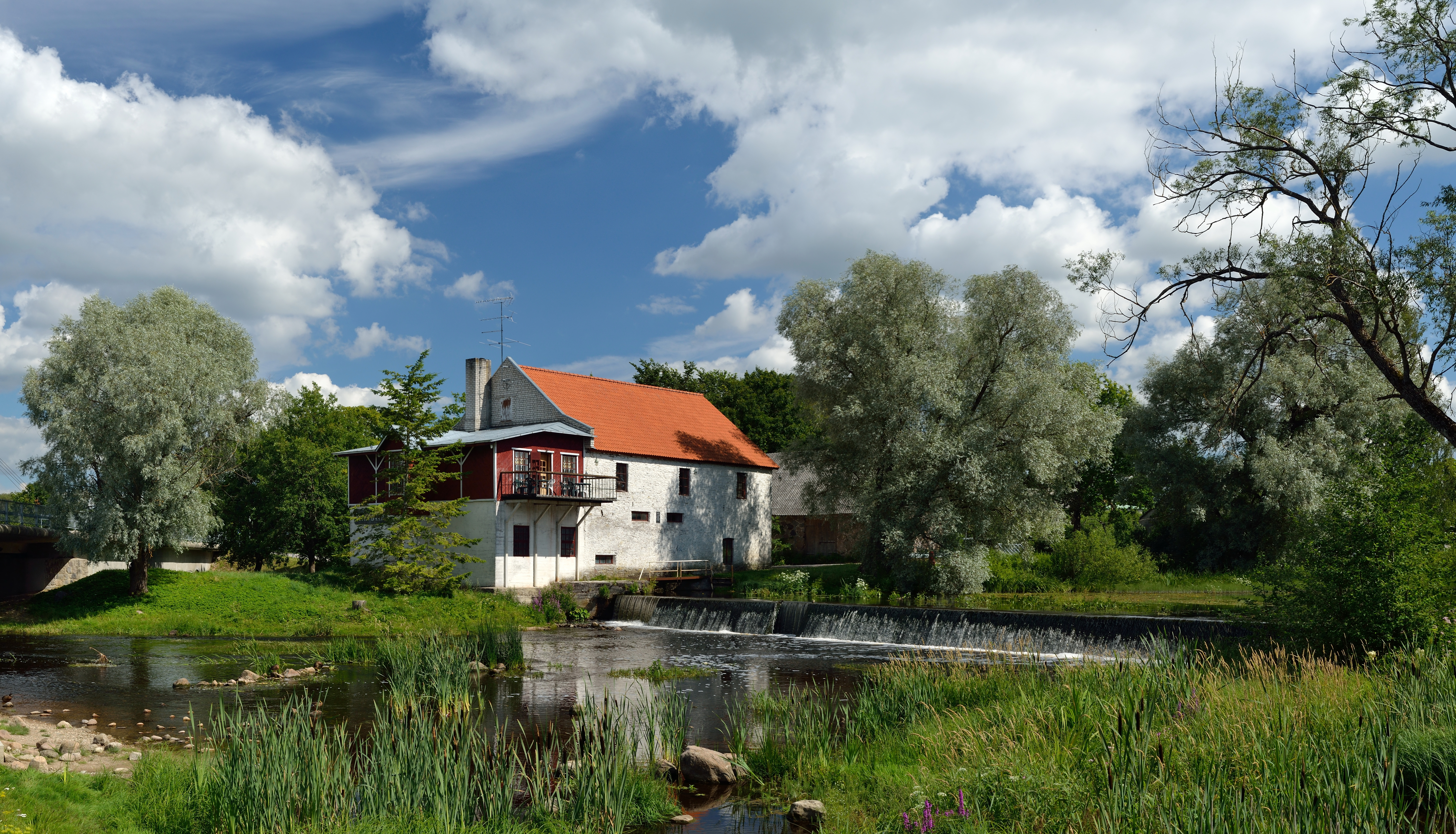
Kohila watermill

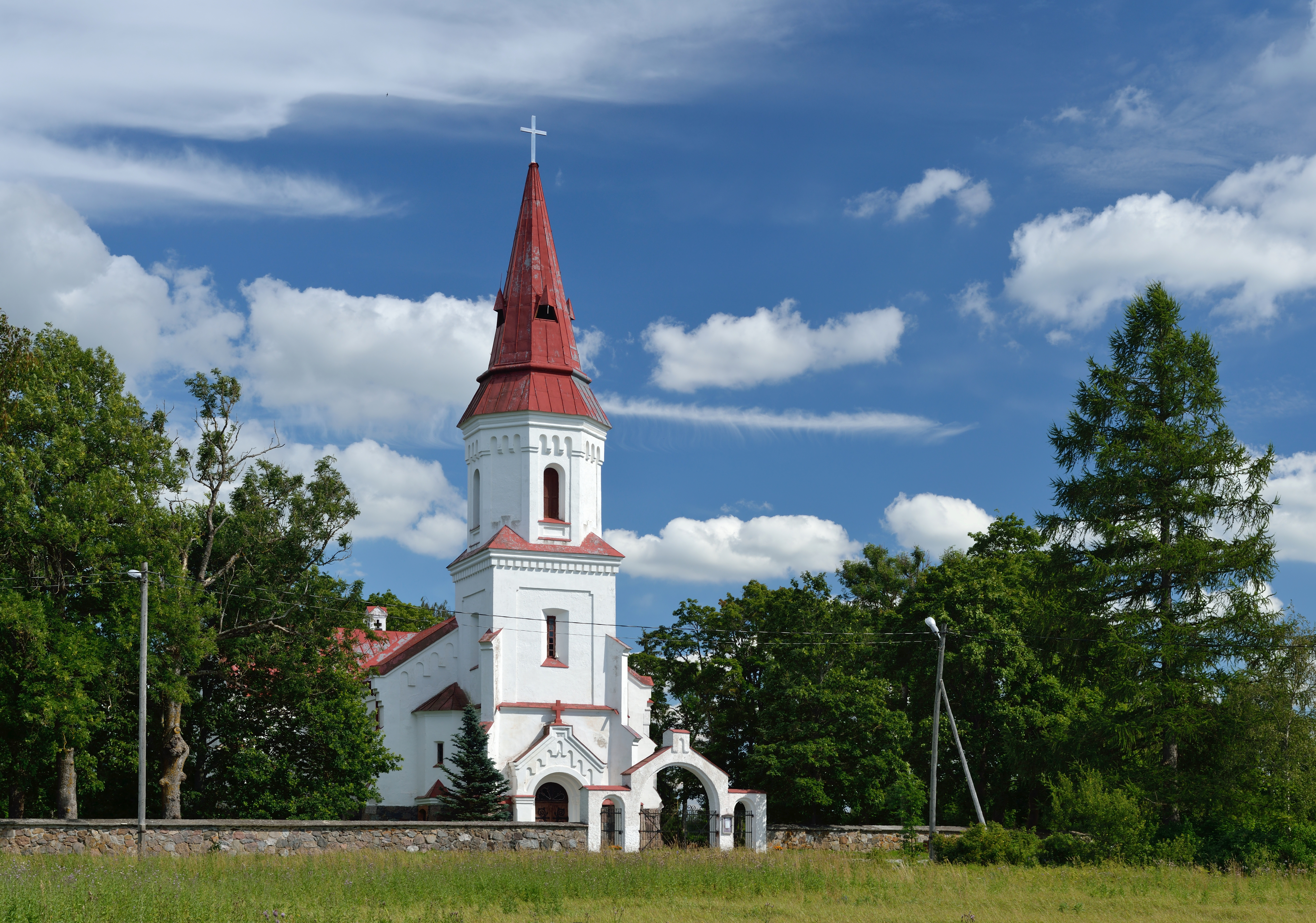
Hageri church

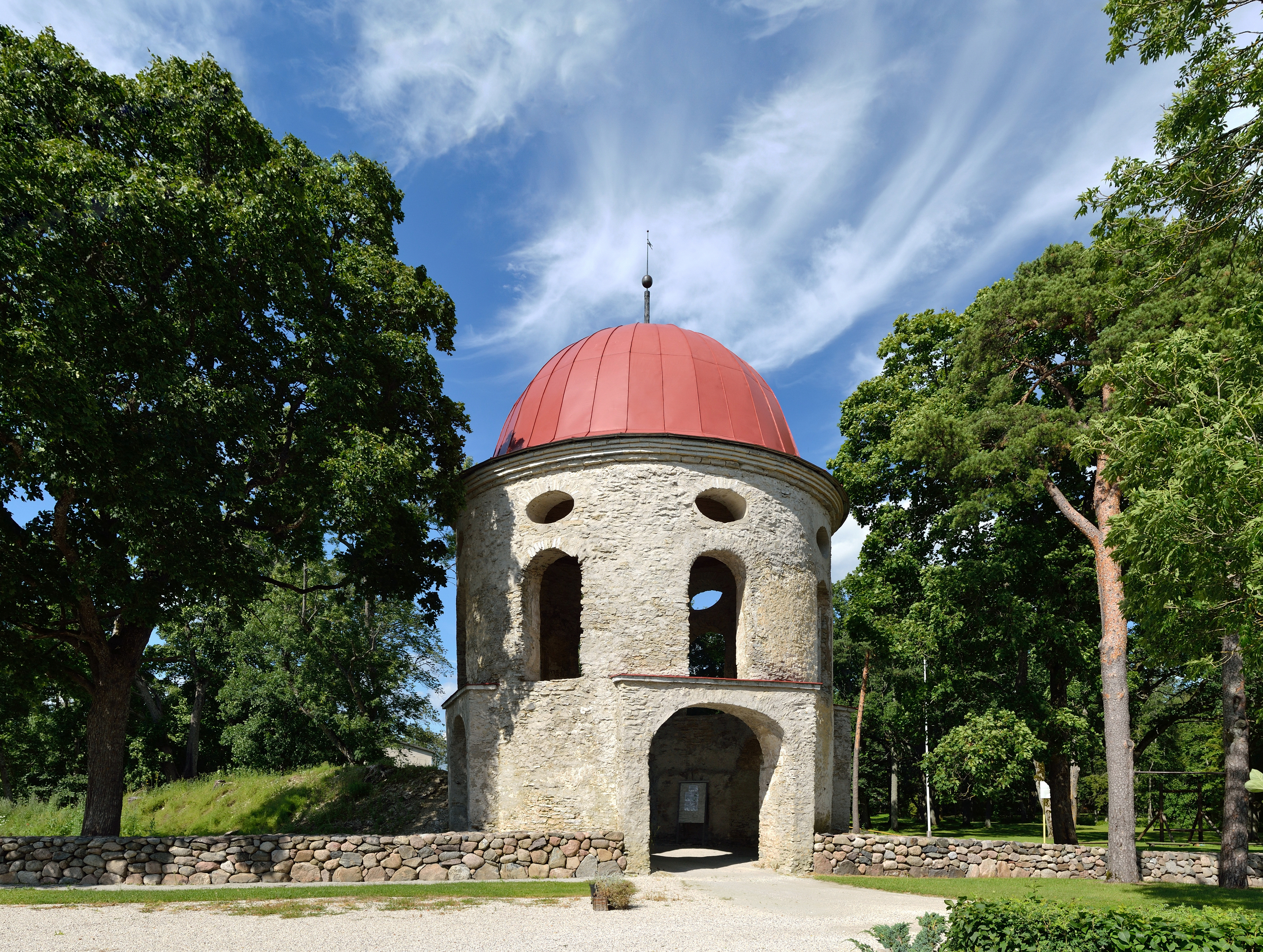
Sutlema manor gate tower

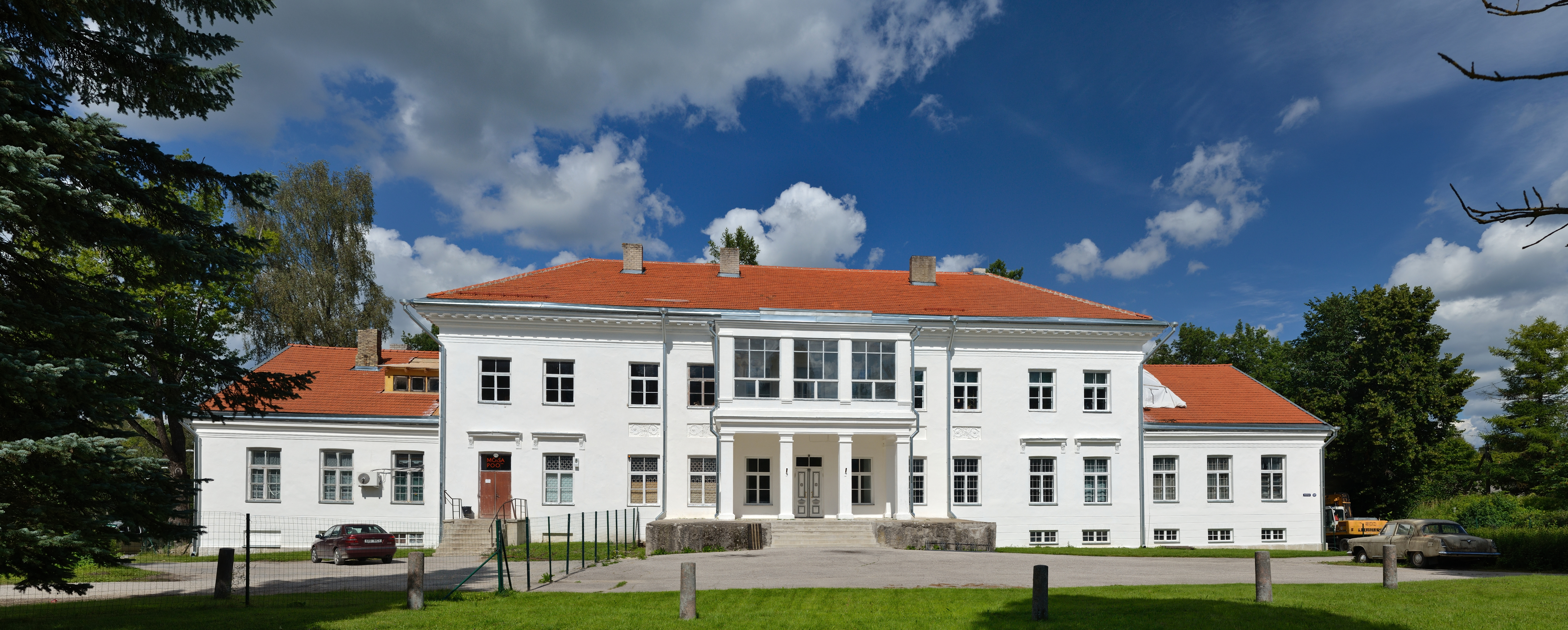
Kohila manor

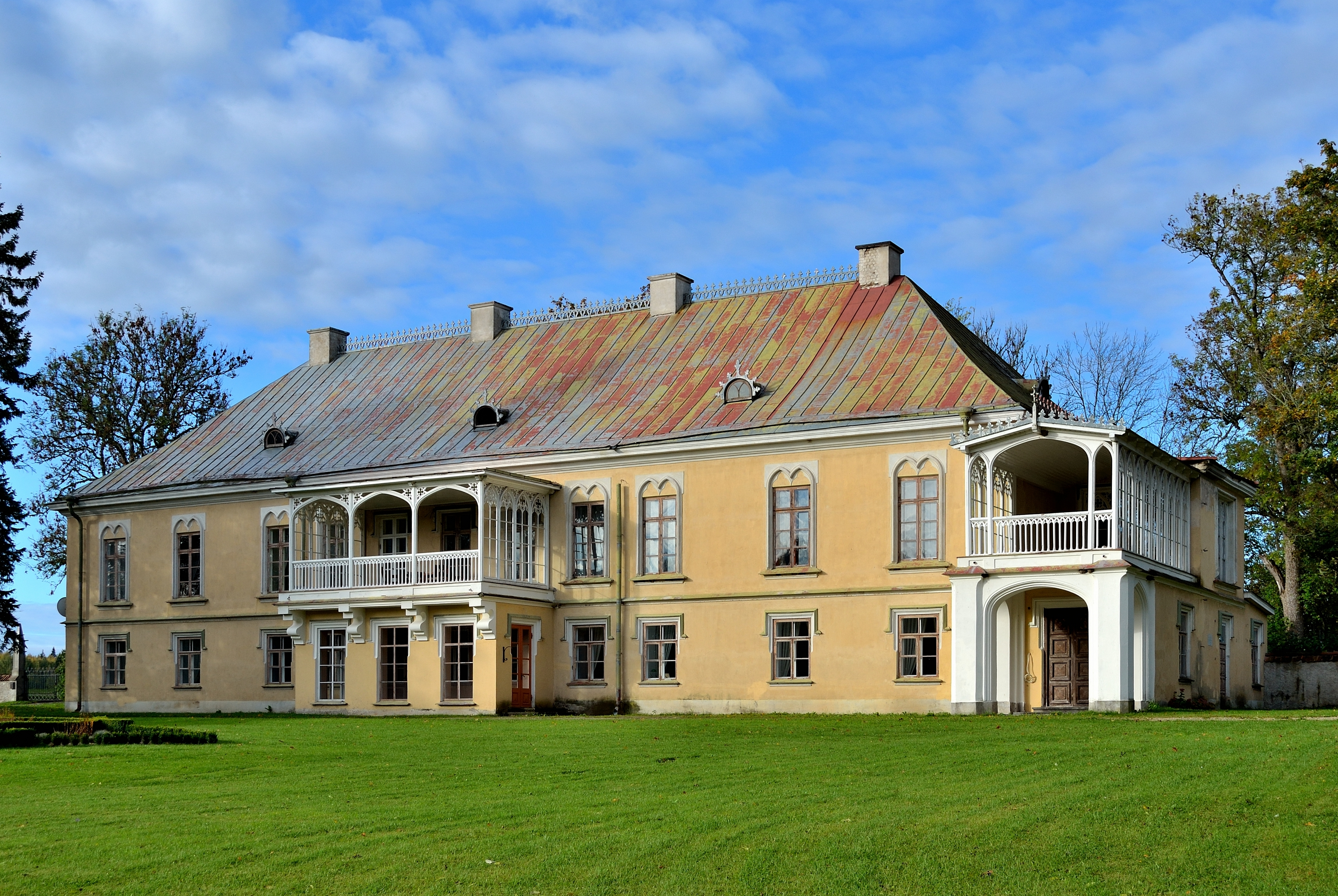
Lohu manor

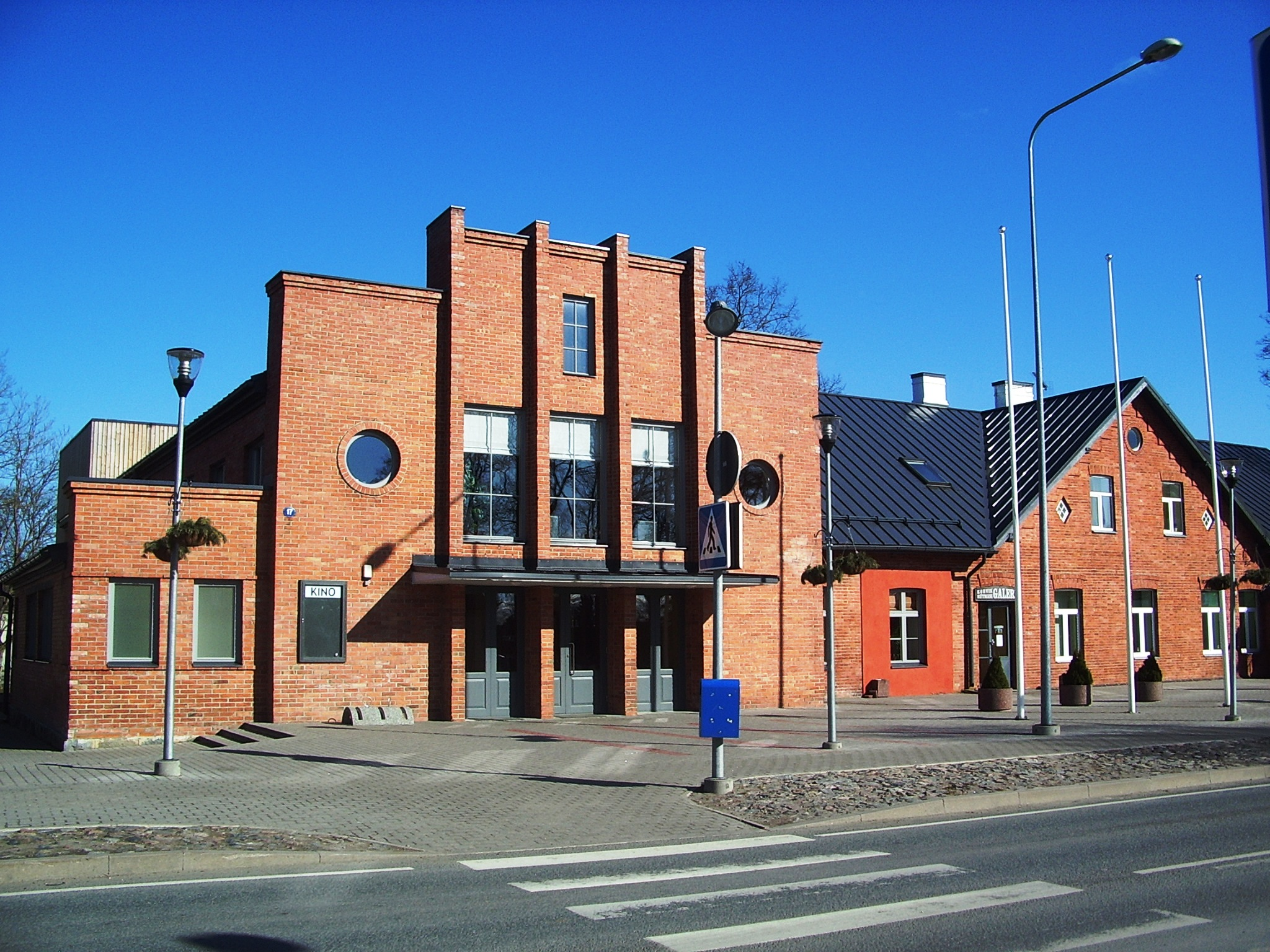
Rapla Culture Centre
