= Påhlman family =

Baltic German and Swedish noble family

Påhlman Pohlmann, Polman, von Pohlmann, Полман
- Noble family
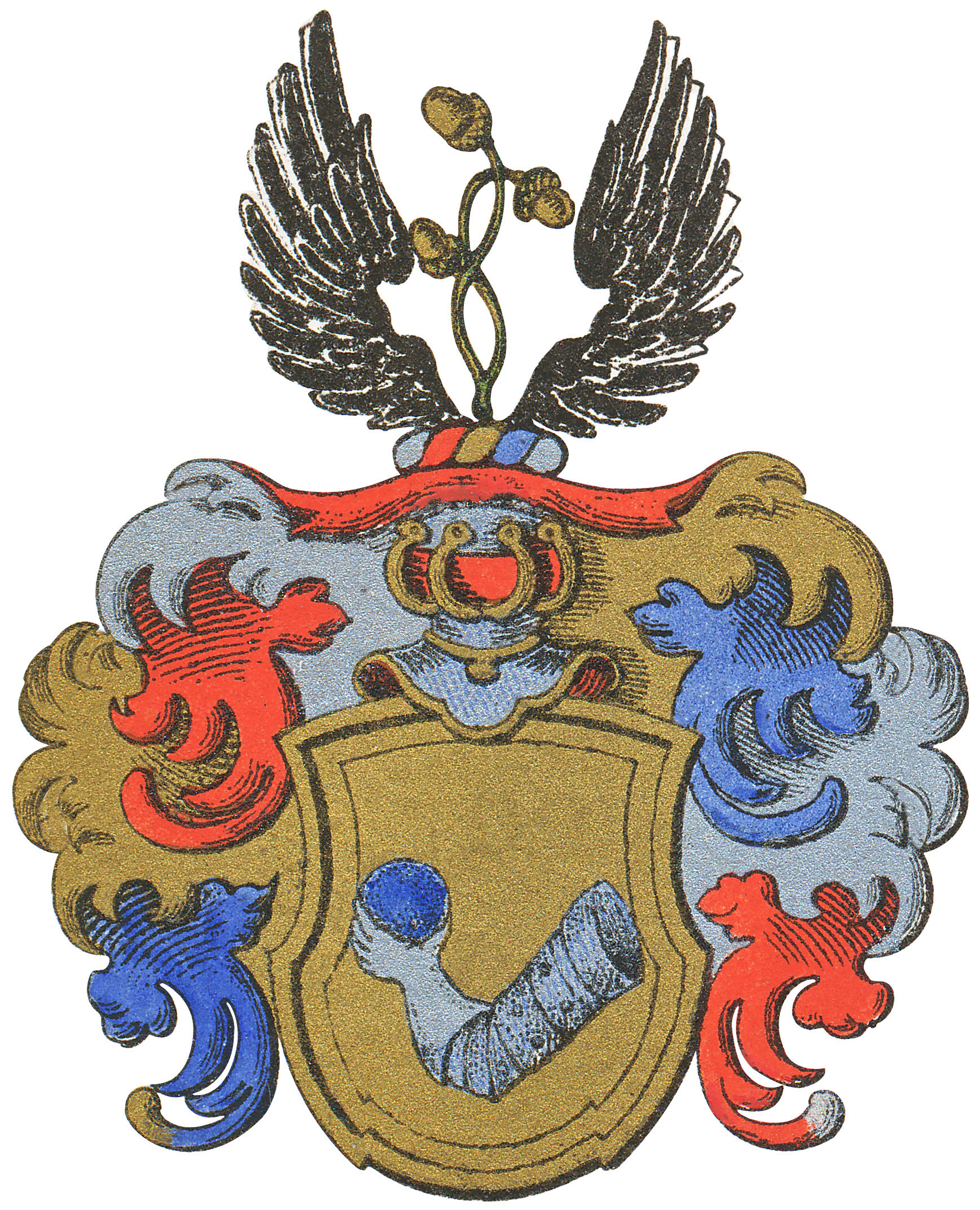
- Arms of the Påhlman family: Or, an armoured arm embowed azure holding a cannonball of the same.
- Country: Historical: Holy Roman Empire; Polish-Lithuanian Commonwealth; Kingdom of Sweden; Russian Empire; Kingdom of Prussia
- Current region: Sweden, Germany, Russia, Norway, Denmark, Australia
- Earlier spellings: Polman, Pollmann
- Origin: Westphalia
- Founded: 1380; 646 years ago
- Founder: Hans Polman (earliest confirmed progenitor)
- Titles: Imperial Baron, Untitled Nobility
- Estates: Pohlmannsche Hof, Germany; Öötla Manor, Estonia; Ugglansryd Manor, Sweden; Ågården Manor, Sweden

The Påhlman family (German: von Pohlmann, also Polman or Pollmann; Swedish: Påhlman; Russian: Полман, romanized: Polman) is an ancient noble family of Westphalian origin, with branches belonging to the Swedish, Estonian, and Prussian nobilities. Members of the family are first attested in Livonia and Swedish Estonia during the late 16th century. Over the following centuries, members of the family held prominent civil and military positions throughout the history of the Kingdom of Sweden.

The Swedish branch was ennobled in 1650 under Queen Christina and introduced into the Swedish House of Nobility. A branch matriculated into the Estonian Knighthood (Note: The family was introduced into the Swedish House of Nobility under no. 501 and the Estonian Knighthood under no. 112.) and later incorporated into the Russian nobility, while a Prussian branch attained baronial rank by diploma around 1735. The family's legacy also includes significant contributions to Swedish education, notably through the founding of the Påhlmans Handelsinstitut in Stockholm.

The family name has various spellings, including Polman, Pollman, Poldemann, Bolemann, Pohlmann, and Påhlman, reflecting its spread across different regions. Several branches remain extant today.

== Name and etymology ==
The Pohlmann or Pollman surname and its variants are of Low German origin and appear in various regions throughout Germany, particularly Westphalia, Bremen, and their surrounding areas. The surname appears in historical records dating back to at least 1254, when a preacher named Johann Polemann was recorded in Braunschweig in Lower Saxony. While name researchers have not reached a definitive conclusion on its etymology, several theories have been proposed. One common interpretation suggests a toponymic origin, meaning 'a man from Poland' or someone who traded with the region. Another theory, proposed by name researcher K. J. Brechenmacher, traces the name to the Old High German given name Baldoman (meaning "bold man"). Other suggestions connect it to an occupational name from the Low German word for stake (paohl), for a builder who worked on pile grids in swampy areas.

M. Pohlmann describes a more widely supported theory, connecting the name to the Middle Low German word pōl, (Note: The word pōl translates to a "pool" or "pond.") referring to a person who lived near water-filled depressions such as ponds or pools, or in general a damp, swampy area with stagnant water. This interpretation is also supported by heraldic evidence, including early coats of arms for Pohlmann families that feature a man standing in water, which would be a literal representation of the name. This theory would also account for the name's independent appearance in multiple locations throughout the Low German-speaking world. For the branch that entered Swedish service, the name was most commonly spelled Polman or Pollman (Note: It was common for names to be recorded with various spellings, and such inconsistencies were generally not considered significant. For example, Jürgen Polman the Elder signed his own name (manu propria) as "Polman," while his son, Jöran, recorded his name as "Pollman" in a military roll.) before being officially recorded as Påhlman upon their ennoblement in 1650.

== History ==
=== Origins ===
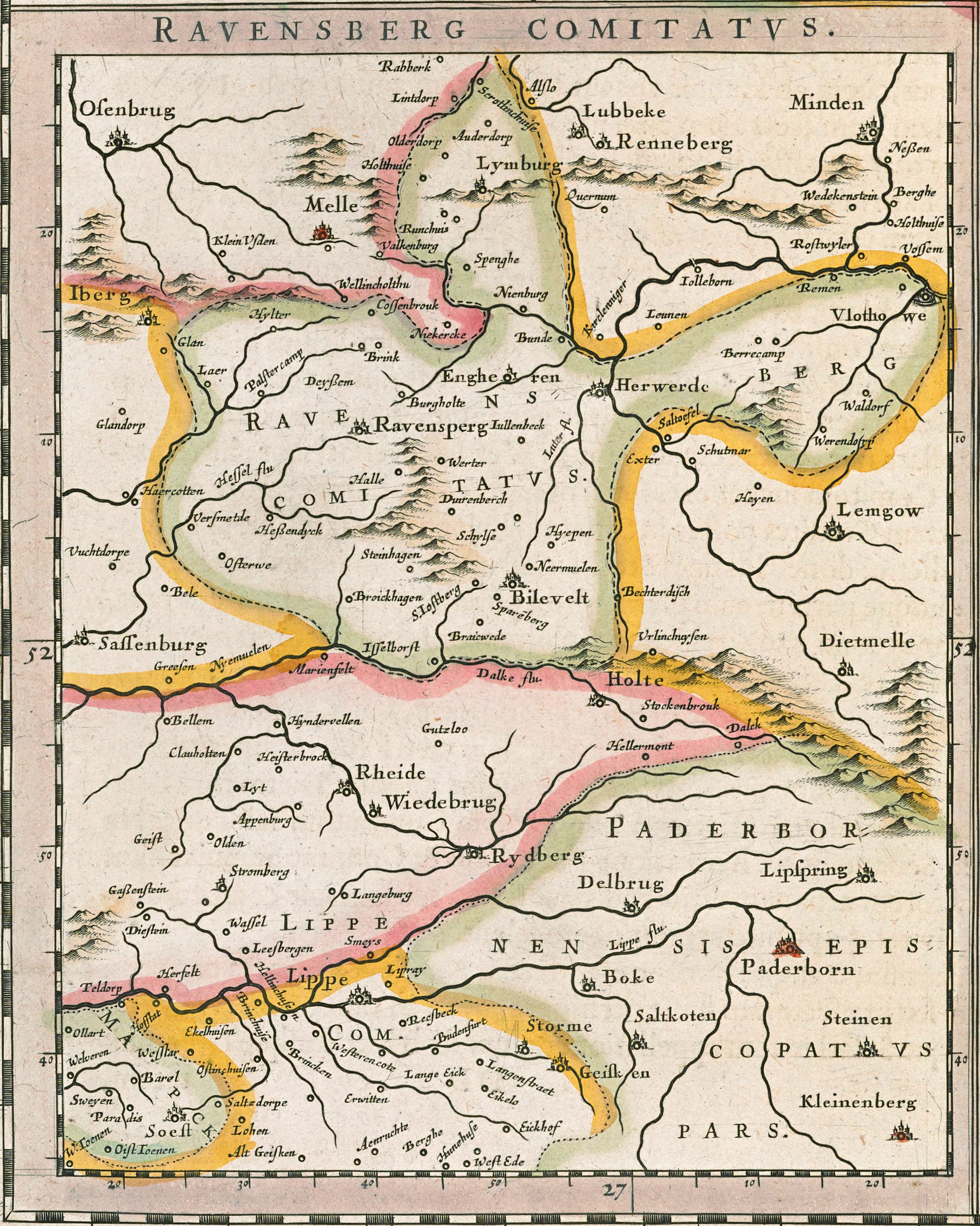
The County of Ravensberg in a 1645 map from the Theatrum orbis terrarum atlas. The parish of Hille is located within this region of Westphalia.

The family is described as an ancient Uradel (Note: Uradel is a German term for the most ancient nobility, typically those whose noble status can be traced to before the 15th century.) noble family with origins tracing to the Middle Ages. A genealogical tree presented at a heraldic conference in Mitau (Note: The German name for Jelgava, in modern-day Latvia.) in 1903 traced the von Pohlmann family from 1380 to 1735. While details of this early lineage are not fully known, this record documents the family's medieval origins.

The Påhlmans came from Westphalia, in the parish of Hille in the county of Ravensberg, (Note: Historically part of the medieval Bishopric of Minden.) where they held the estate Pohlmannsche Hof (later Meyerhof). The family was also connected to the nearby Hofgut von Oeynhausen (later Reimlers Hof) through the marriage of Susanne Pohlmann (1644–1728) to Colonel Johann Ernst Heinrich von Oeynhausen. In 1728, the estate passed to Christian Friedrich Pohlmann. (Note: The Hofgut von Oeynhausen remained in the Pohlmann family for two more generations. Upon Christian Friedrich's death in 1781, it passed to his son, Christian Gottlieb Ludwig von Pohlmann (d. 1819), and then to his daughter, Wilhelmine Luise Auguste von Pohlmann. The estate was sold by Wilhelmine's husband in 1882 to Friedrich Wilhelm Reimler.)

The family's original arms — an arm holding a ring — are documented on the estate's gatehouse, which was built between 1699 and 1703. The village's Protestant church provides further evidence of the family's long-standing presence. Early burials recorded there include Hermann Pohlmann and his son Johan (1619–1622). (Note: A plaque hangs in the Hille church reporting the death of a child who died young. On the panel depicts Christ on the cross, standing under the cross is Hermann Pohlmann with his wife and deceased son. The inscription reads: "Anno 1619 June 13th is Hermann Pohlmanns son Johann born, died 1622. I live for you, Christ, I’ll die for you.") In 1725, a significant later contribution was made by Susanne Pohlmann, who donated the altar to the church in Hille, which is adorned with both of their family crests.

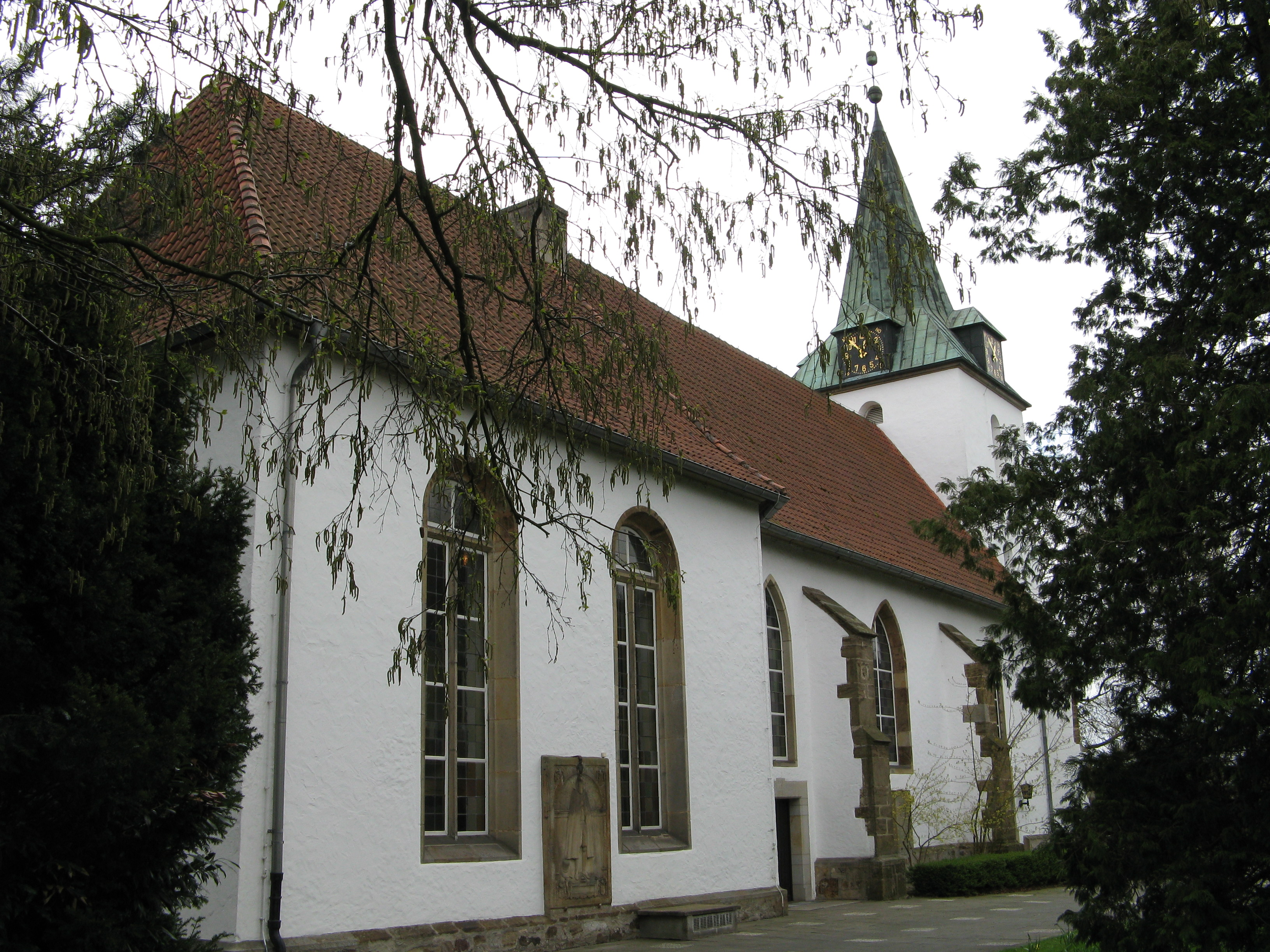
The Evangelische Kirche in Hille, dating to 1523. The Pohlmann family is connected to the church through burials and an altar endowed by Susanne Pohlmann and her husband.

From Westphalia, members of the family are recorded in Poland and later in Livonia. This early presence in Livonia is evidenced by established landholdings, including Pollmannland near Ascheraden (now Aizkraukle, Latvia) before 1557 and Planup (Note: Also known as Plānupe) manor, held by Hector Polemann from 1591 to 1598. Branches of the family were counted among the nobility of the Polish-Lithuanian Commonwealth, and their presence is noted in the Duchy of Courland from the 16th century, specifically in the town of Candau (now Kandava, Latviva). Records from this period include a "Captain Pohlmann" noted in 1624, though his identity is unclear, and a distinct coat of arms featuring three acorns, associated with a "Jürgen Pollmann" in Courland in 1624.

By the late 16th century, bearers of the name appear as councillors in Reval between 1550 and 1587, and members of the family are recorded near Dorpat (Alt-Pigant) around 1600. Contemporary figures named Jürgen, Wilhelm, and Johann are attested, although early links between them are not fully documented. The earliest confirmed patriarch is Hans Polman, a county clerk (Swedish: amtskrivare) in Padis, St. Matthias parish in 1603. His son, Jürgen Polman the Elder (d. before 1641), entered the service of Duke Karl of Södermanland in 1600, establishing the foundation for the family's long-standing service to the Swedish Crown. His sons, Jöran Polman the Younger (d. before 1636) and Claus Pohlmann (d. c. 1696), became the respective progenitors of the Swedish "Påhlman" and Estonian "von Pohlmann" branches.

=== Swedish branch ===
==== Origins of service to the Crown (c. 1600–1641) ====
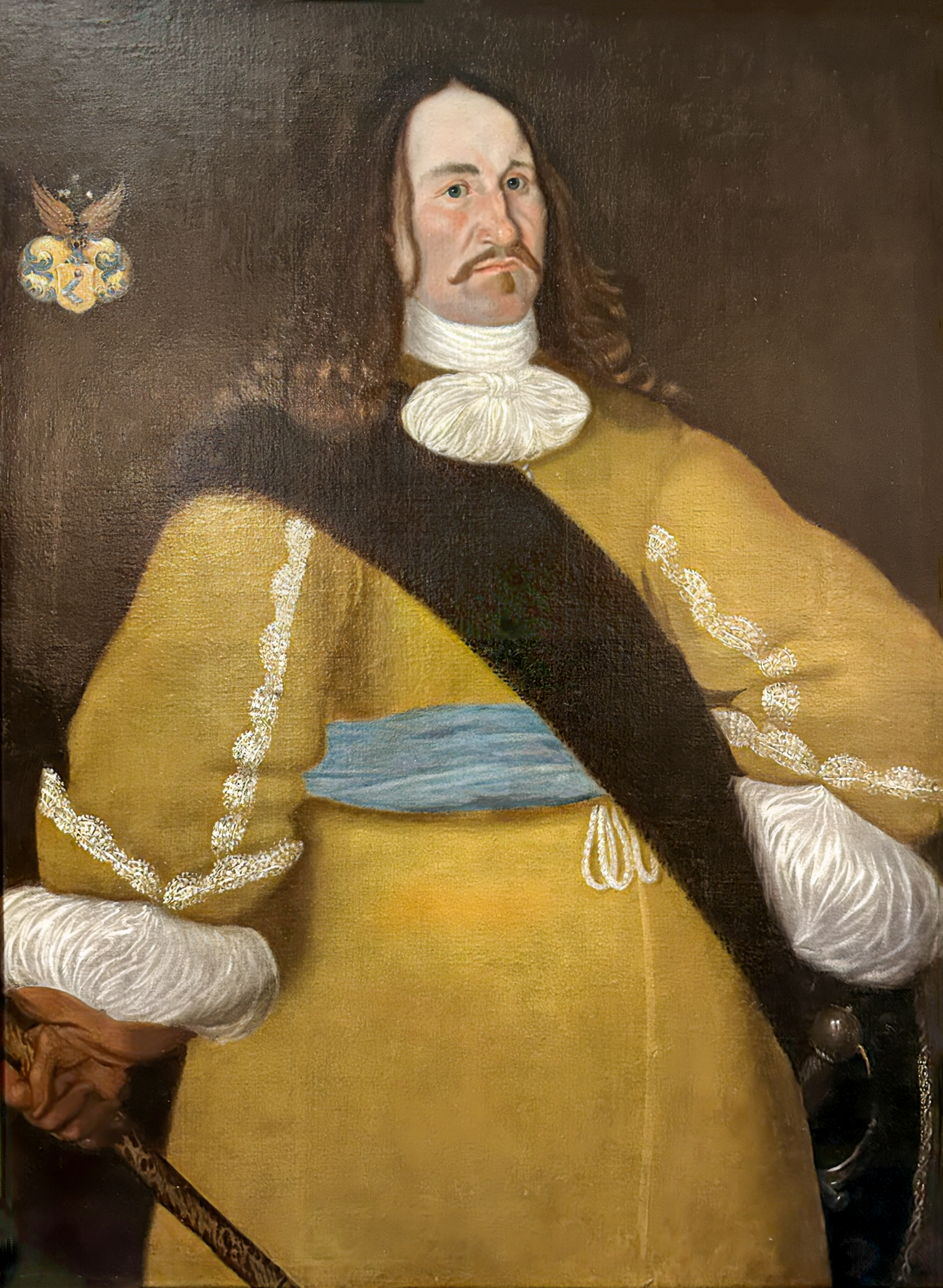
Jürgen Polman the Elder († by 1641), founded the family's Påhlman and von Pohlmann branches. Portrait at Karlbergs slott.

The Swedish branch traces its lineage to Jürgen Polman the Elder (Note: The name Jürgen is the most common form found in German-language sources. Due to his service across the Swedish Empire, he also appears under different linguistic variations in historical records, including Göran (Swedish), Georg (Estonian), and Yrjö (Finnish).) (d. before 1641), a Baltic German nobleman who laid the foundation for the family's centuries-long service to the Swedish Crown. He entered the service of Duke Karl of Södermanland, the future King Charles IX of Sweden, on 20 November 1600. Around this time, in exchange for a sum of money that Jürgen had formerly advanced to the Duke, Jürgen was given the manor Piigandi (Pigant). This was a "knight manor" located in the Kannapäh parish of Estonia, owned by Polish families and later seized by them once again. By 1601 he was appointed captain (German: hauptmann) at Anzen in Livonia (now Antsla, Estonia).

Jürgen's direct contribution to the Polish-Swedish War (1600–1611) is documented in correspondence from Duke Karl, who expressed his approval of Jürgen's success in enlisting over one hundred farmers for the war effort. However, his service was not without peril. After being captured by Polish forces, Jürgen wrote a strategic appeal for his freedom to his commander, Anders Lennartsson. In the letter, he reminded his commander of his loyal service at his "own cost with four horses" and warned that failing to secure his exchange would "cause great loathing among many righteous people who will think twice to risk their life and limb again" — a potent warning from a key military recruiter.

As a reward for his loyalty, Jürgen was granted numerous fiefs across the Swedish Empire. These included estates in Sääksmäki parish in Tavastland (Note: Tavastia is a historical province in the south of Finland.) from 1604 to 1619. These land grants were often precarious, requiring the holder to fulfill significant military obligations, such as providing horses for the cavalry. In a direct appeal to the Lord High Chancellor, Axel Oxenstierna, Jürgen protested that a rival cavalry captain had seized half his lands in Sääksmäki based on the false accusation that he had failed his military obligations. Citing his "hardship in prison and long years of service," he demanded that "truth and justice" prevail so that he could secure a modest livelihood for his family in his old age. In 1615, the heirs of Jacob von Lunden had the right to transfer ownership of the manor Tuttomäggi to Jürgen. However, his tenure on the property was short-lived and it was lost by 1630.

In his later years, his status was more firmly established. In 1613 he was appointed governor and commander (Note: The Swedish title is ståthållare och befallningsman) of Padise Abbey. In 1624, Jürgen received Oethel manor (Öötla) in St. Peter's parish as a fief, which was formally granted to him as a donation by King Gustavus Adolphus in 1631. The exact date of his death is unknown; he was last documented as living in 1632 and had died by 1641, when ownership of Oethel passed to his widow and second wife, Gertrud von Bremen. His first wife was Anna Wesell.

==== Establishment in Sweden (17th century) ====
Jöran Polman the Younger († bef. 1636), who established the family's Swedish line. Portrait from 1623 at Skoklosters slott.

The family's presence in Sweden was solidified by Jürgen's eldest son, Jöran Polman the Younger (Note: He is often referred to as Jöran or Göran Polman. To distinguish him from his father, some sources use Jürgen the Younger, though this can cause ambiguity. In art historical contexts, he is commonly known as Jörgen Pålman, which is the name his 1623 portrait is catalogued under at Skokloster Castle.) (1597 — d. before 1636). Continuing in his father's military steps, Jöran advanced through the ranks of the Swedish army, serving as a captain in the Kronoberg Regiment from 1623, as Quartermaster (Swedish: överkvartermästare) in 1629, and ultimately reaching the rank of Major. Jöran served under Field Marshal Herman Wrangel and was among the officers who captured the fortress of Riga in 1621, ensuring Swedish control over the coasts of the Baltic. He also attempted to secure ownership of Tuttomäggi Manor, though his request for a new letter of ownership was denied.

Around 1623 he married Christina Lilliesparre and, through that marriage, acquired the manor Ugglansryd in Ryssby, Småland, which remained in the family for 175 years. In October 1624, King Gustavus Adolphus granted him the manor of Prästeboda and several farms, which Jöran then incorporated as a barn estate under his main manor, Kvänjarp Södregård. The family held this for half a century before it was reclaimed by the Crown in 1683, a likely result of the Great Reduction.

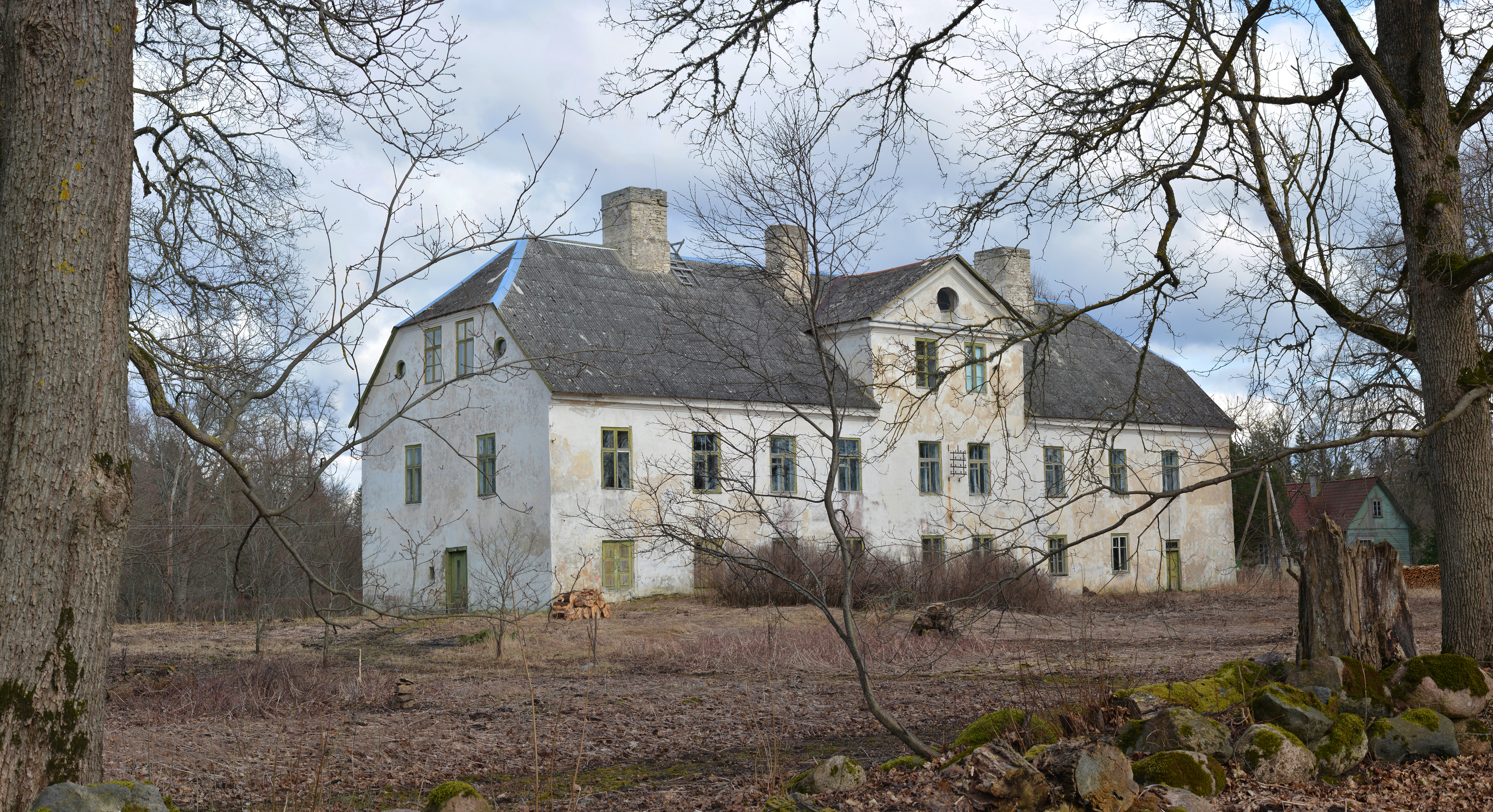
Tuudi (Tuttomäggi) Manor in Estonia. The estate was coveted by both Jürgen Polman the Elder, who held it briefly, and his son Jöran, who later tried in vain to reclaim it.

Jöran's sons, the cavalry masters (ryttmästare) Johan (d. 1693) and Gustaf (d. 1695) Polman, continued the family's military service during the latter stages of the Thirty Years' War. Following the war, the brothers petitioned Queen Christina to have their ancient noble lineage from Westphalia formally recognized and matriculated into the Swedish House of Nobility. However, their documentation was deemed insufficient to prove their claim.

Despite this, Queen Christina chose to grant them nobility on 16 September 1650, issuing a letter of nobility (sköldebrev) (Note: The original letter (Swedish: sköldebrev) has been deposited at Riddarhuset since 1918.) that detailed the reasons for the honor. The letter cited the family's long loyalty, rewarding not only the brothers' own military service — in which they had conducted themselves "faithfully, well, and manfully" — but also the "faithful and good services" of their father, Jöran, and grandfather, Jürgen the Elder. The Queen's letter acknowledged their claim to ancient lineage but noted that proof had become "obscured" (fördunklat) by the "difficulties of the times."

Upon their introduction into the House of Nobility, they adopted the surname Påhlman and were registered under no. 501. Two years later, in 1652, Queen Christina issued a personal declaration that their sister, Anna Christina, was to be included in her brothers' noble status. The ennoblement formally recognized the family's contributions, securing their position within the Swedish aristocracy.

===== The Påhlman Family Tomb =====
Påhlman Family Tomb

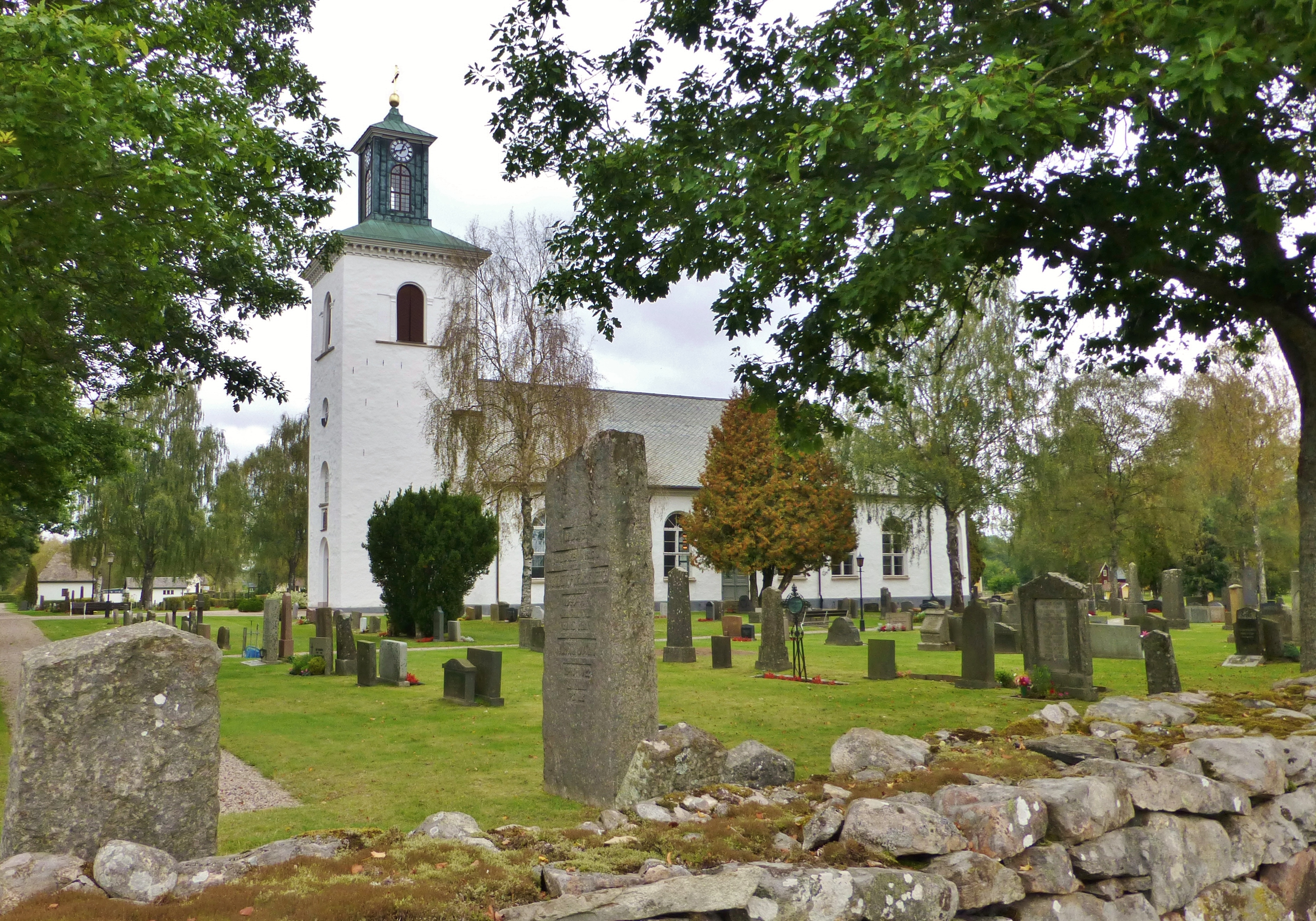
The current Ryssby Church, built 1840-1844 on a site adjacent to the original medieval church.

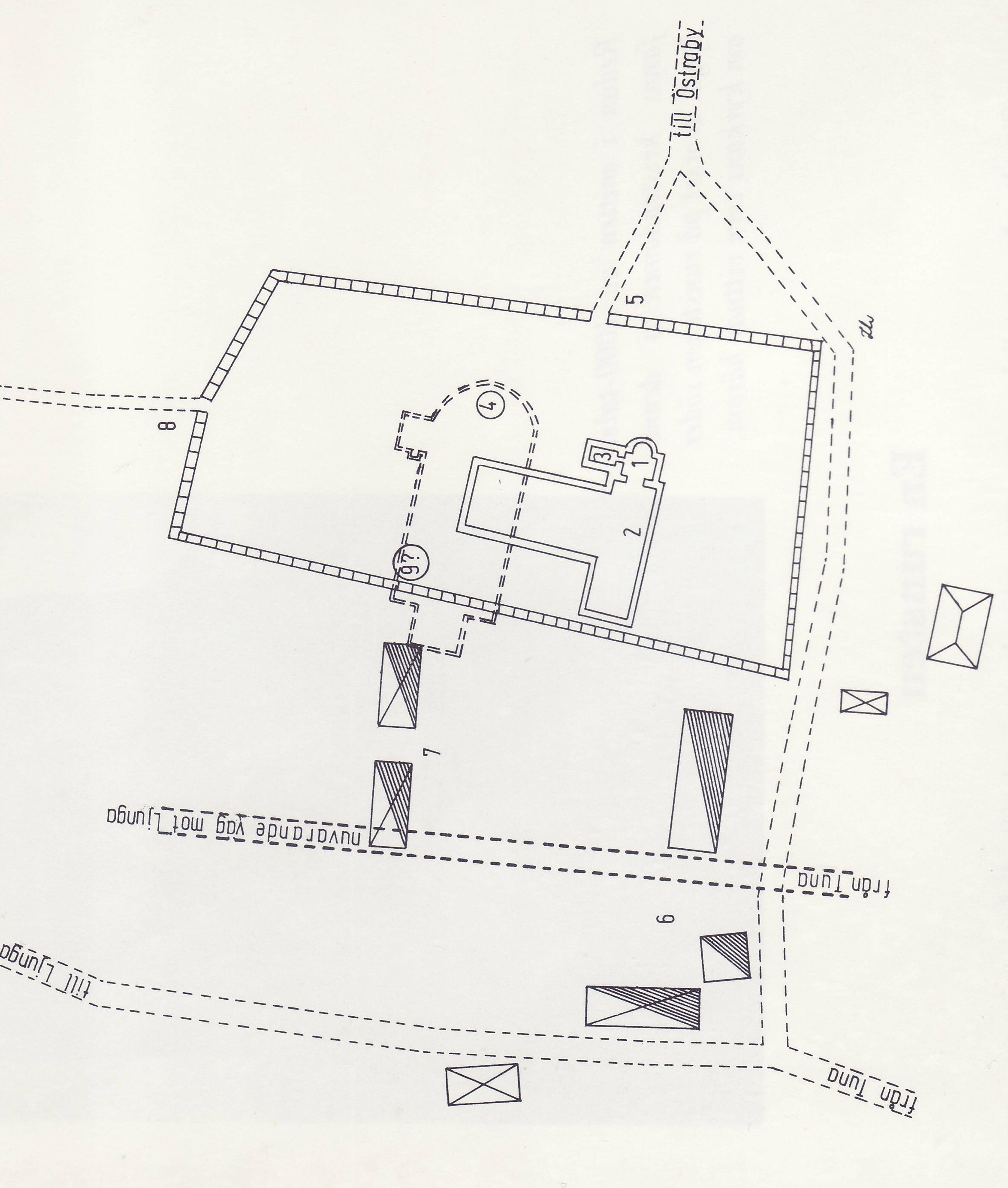
Plan of the medieval church overlaid with the footprint of the current church, illustrating the change in location and orientation. The Påhlman family tomb is marked #3 within the old sacristy.

The family's deep connection to their parish was centered on the original medieval church in Ryssby (Ryssby gamla kyrka), a stone structure likely built in the 12th century. (Note: The medieval stone church (Ryssby gamla kyrka) was 27 meters long and 6 meters wide, and housed an organ with 9 voices and 3 bells.) Inside the old church were the coats of arms of the noble Påhlman and Netherwood families, an example of their status in the parish. The old church also contained two walled tombs, one belonged to the owner of Stensnäs manor, and the other to the Påhlman family. Many generations of family members were entombed here, including Jöran Polman the Younger — who died overseas and whose body was brought back for burial — and his sons, the brothers Johan and Gustaf Polman.

Between 1840 and 1844, a new, larger church was constructed on an adjacent site to replace the medieval one. Upon its completion, the old church was demolished, with some of its stone being reused in the new building's foundation. During this process, the Påhlman family tomb was either destroyed or moved, and its present location is unknown. While the original tomb is lost, the family's historical connection to the parish remains visible. A copy of Jöran Polman's portrait is displayed inside the current Ryssby Church as a reminder of the family's legacy. The original portrait was painted in Kalmar in 1623 by Georg Günther Kraill von Bemeberg as part of a series commissioned by Field Marshal Herman Wrangel to depict all the officers of the Kronoberg Regiment.

==== Service in the Carolean Era (18th century) ====
A generation later, the family's legacy of military service continued into the Carolean era, defined by the Great Northern War (1700–1721) and the campaigns of King Charles XII's. Two brothers, Göran Påhlman (1670–1724) and Carl Gustaf Påhlman (1679–1757), had notable military careers during this period. Both served as officers in the Kronoberg Regiment. Carl Gustaf's career saw rapid advancement amidst constant warfare; he was promoted eight times between 1698 and 1708, rising from corporal to premier captain.

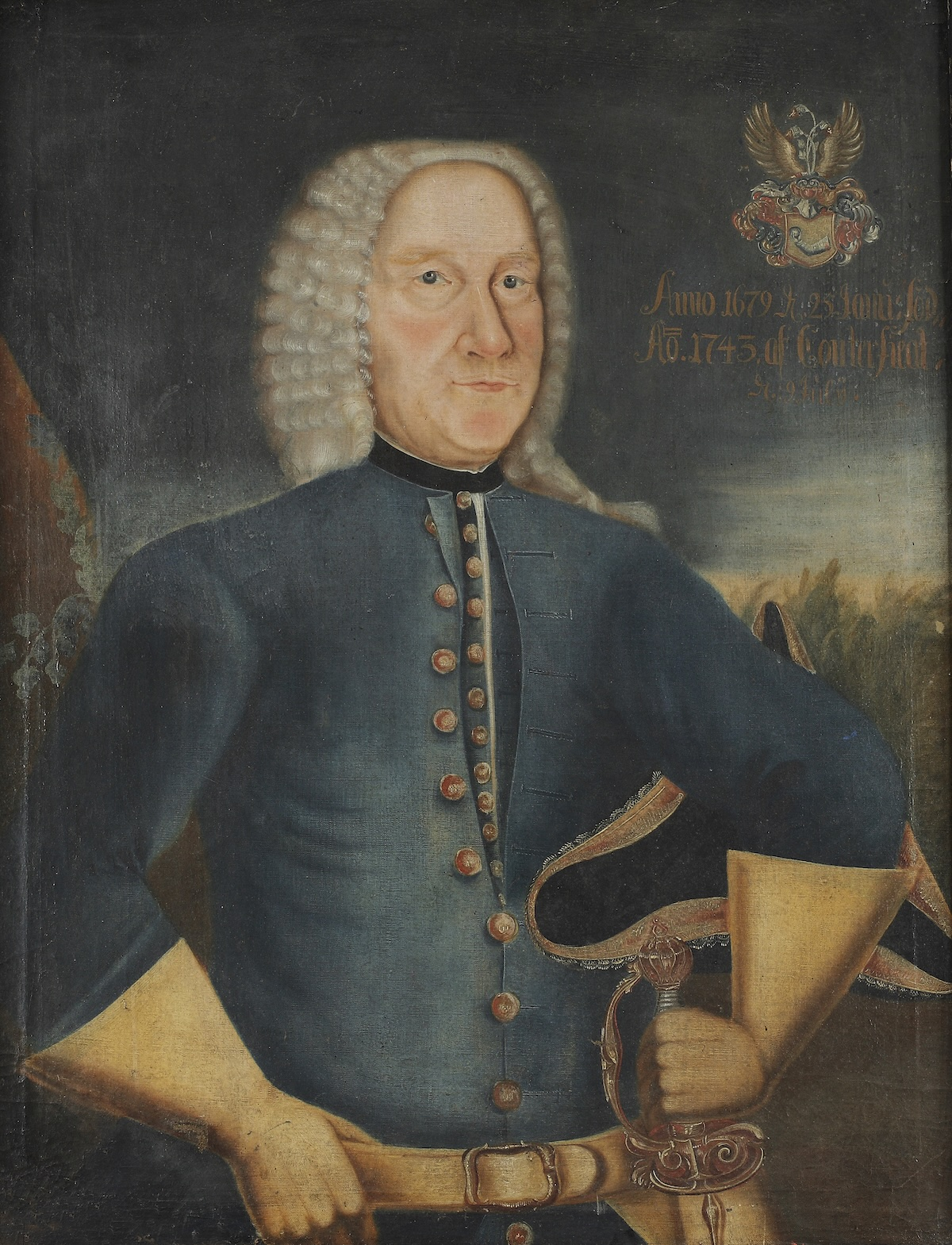
Lieutenant Colonel Carl Gustaf Påhlman (1679–1757). A veteran of the Great Northern War, he survived near-fatal wounds and 14 years of Russian captivity following the surrender at Perevolochna.

He participated in major engagements across Europe, including the attack at Rensbek in Holstein (1700), clashes at Vladislava and Petrovien in Poland (1703–1704), and the decisive Battle of Fraustadt in 1706. At Fraustadt, he and his brother Göran served together as officers in the Kronoberg Regiment. During the battle, Carl Gustaf was severely wounded by two shots described as 'mortal', but survived. He was wounded again during the storming of Veprik in Ukraine in 1709, shortly before the events at Poltava.

The turning point for both brothers came after the Swedish defeat at the Battle of Poltava in 1709. They were among the thousands of soldiers of the main Swedish army, known as the Karoliner, who were forced to surrender at Perevolochna. Captured by Russian forces, they were forced into a long period of captivity in Tobolsk, Siberia. For fourteen years (1709–1723), they endured exile along with a large portion of the Swedish officer corps. During their captivity, the prisoners formed a unique society, using their diverse skills in areas like engineering, teaching, and crafts to survive. (Note: The phenomenon of this self-sufficient community of prisoners in Tobolsk was documented by the French philosopher Voltaire in his History of Charles XII, King of Sweden.)

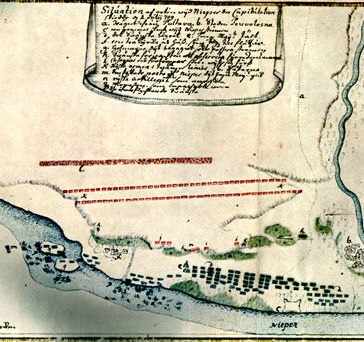
A map depicting the surrender of the Swedish army at Perevolochna in 1709. Brothers Carl Gustaf and Göran Påhlman were among the thousands of officers captured in this event.

Göran Påhlman died in 1724, shortly after his return to Sweden. Carl Gustaf, however, returned with the rank of Major in 1723 and settled back at the family estate of Ugglansryd. He resigned from active military duty but was granted the honorary title of Lieutenant Colonel (överstelöjtnant) in 1740. At age 51, he married Christina Elisabet Renner (1712–1769) and raised a new generation of the family.

The family's standing was further recognized in 1778 during the reign of Gustav III. As part of a major reform of the Swedish House of Nobility, the Knight Class was expanded. The Påhlman family was elevated from the Class of Esquires into this restored Knight Class, being included among the 300 oldest families from their former class to receive the honor. The family continued through Carl Gustaf's sons, Anders Otto (1740–1815), Johan Magnus (1741–1797), and Adolf Fredrik (1743–1825), who became the respective progenitors of the family's branches that still exist.

==== Political and civic influence (19th century) ====
As Sweden entered a long period of peace after the Napoleonic Wars, the family's influence shifted from the battlefield to the political arena. This new direction was primarily shaped by the career of Otto Fredrik Påhlman (1785–1822). A graduate of the Karlberg Military Academy, Otto Fredrik served as an officer in the Finnish War (1808–1809) and the Napoleonic Wars, eventually becoming an adjutant (Note: A primarily administrative military role; to some extent he became the mouthpiece for the prince.) to Crown Prince Karl Johan. (Note: Crown Prince Karl Johan was the French Marshal Jean-Baptiste Bernadotte, who later reigned as King Charles XIV John of Sweden.) Alongside his military service, Otto Fredrik became a highly influential liberal voice in the Riksdag of the Estates, attending every session between 1809 and 1818 and holding key positions, including Director of the House of Nobility and member of the State and Banking Committees. His liberal political leanings were evident early in his career. During the pivotal 1810 Riksdag that elected Bernadotte as Crown Prince, Count Carl Axel Löwenhielm recalled an exchange with Otto Fredrik, who is described as an "enthusiastic liberal nobleman" who "anticipated a social transformation in the republican spirit". Löwenhielm recounted his warning to Otto Fredrik:

You are cheering now, but you are fooling yourself about the future, it won't be you and your party that will acquire any intimacy with Bernadotte...whereas I and my brother, who are against this choice, will become his leading favourites. [...] What I said then, came completely true…

— Carl Axel Löwenhielm in his memoirs

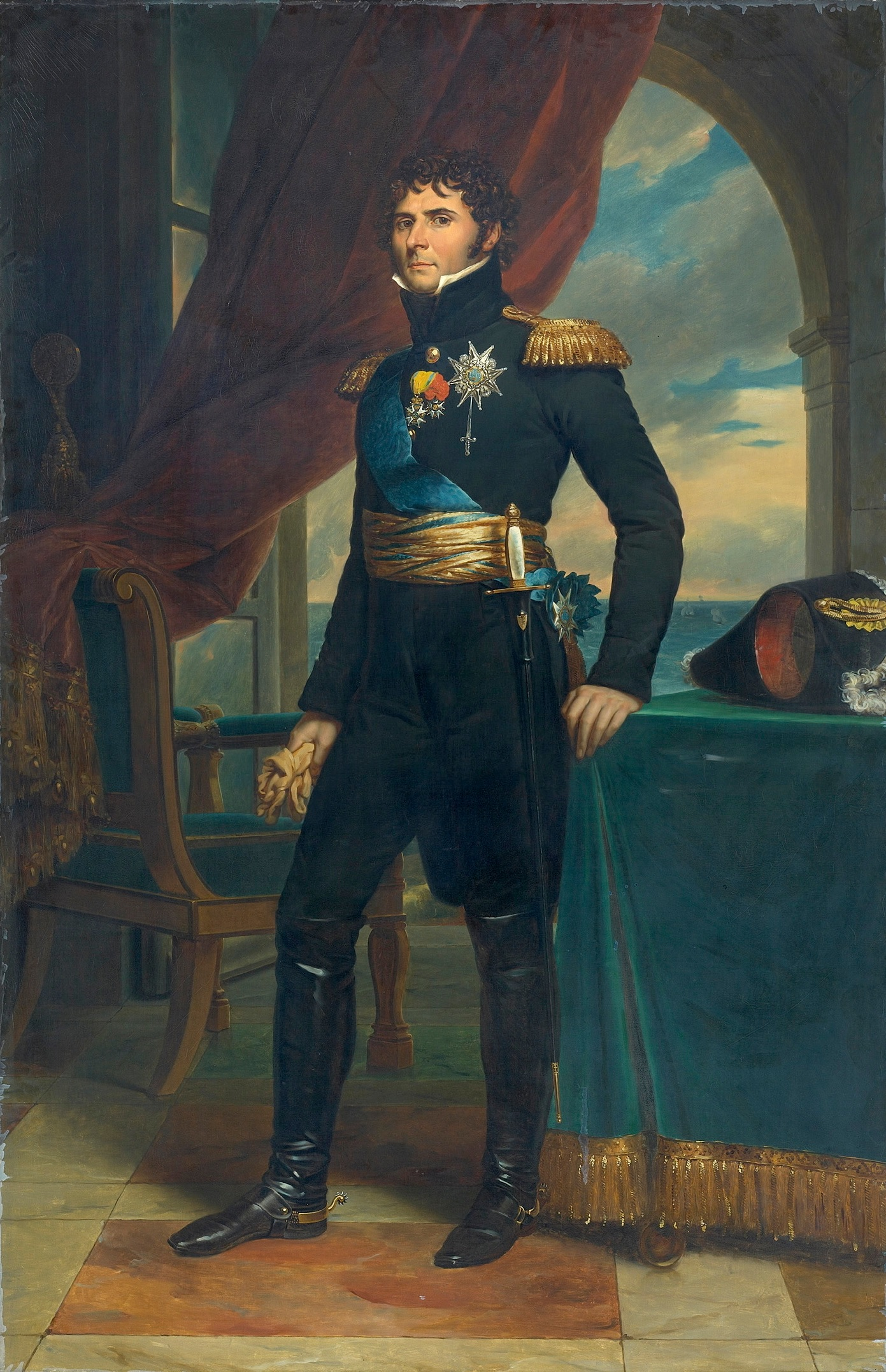
Crown Prince Karl Johan (later King Charles XIV John), to whom Otto Fredrik Påhlman served as adjutant during his influential career in the Riksdag.

Otto Fredrik is most noted for his role during the Riksdag of 1815, where he became a powerful defender of Jewish civil rights in Sweden. In the economic crisis following the Napoleonic Wars, anti-Jewish sentiment was high, with calls from the burgher estate for immigration bans and even deportation. Otto Fredrik publicly countered these demands, arguing that the accusations against the Jewish community were false and motivated by "competitive envy." In a widely circulated memorial, he asserted that the restrictive Judereglementet ('The Jewish Regulations') should be abolished. He argued that Jewish people should be granted full civil rights and the freedom to choose their occupation, claiming this would ultimately benefit the nation.

His outspoken defense provoked a political backlash, particularly from the burgher estate, and sparked a heated public debate in newspapers and pamphlets. The controversy drew the attention of the Crown Prince, who was initially unaware of his adjutant's actions. Despite attempts by the bourgeoisie to have him censured by his own estate, Otto Fredrik's arguments helped shift the discourse, and a subsequent special committee acknowledged that the allegations against the Jewish community were largely biased.

Shortly before his death, Otto Fredrik was appointed colonel in the army and acting governor of Östergötland County. His high standing was reflected in a contemporary newspaper notice that referred to him as "the king's troman," a man highly trusted by the monarch.

However, his career ended abruptly with his early death in Linköping on 8 May 1822, just seven months after his marriage. His death was reportedly by suicide, an act that contemporary sources attributed to the "worries and expenses" caused by the "dilatory business and behaviour" of his brothers.

==== Inheritance of the Ågården Estate (19th century) ====
A separate branch of the family became known as Påhlman-Stiernsparre through inheritance of the Ågården estate. In 1786, the estate was made a fideikommiss (Note: A fideikommiss is a legal arrangement, similar to a family trust or entail, that keeps an estate within a family line.) by Axel Magnus Stiernsparre, Marshal of the Court. He stipulated that should the Stiernsparre male line become extinct, any subsequent heir would be required to add the name "Stiernsparre" to their own. After the Stiernsparre family died out, the fideikommiss passed through the Silfversparre family to Augusta Ulrika Silfversparre (1798–1872), who was married to a Påhlman. Their son, Lars Gustaf Adolf Wilhelm Påhlman-Stiernsparre, became the first of the family to hold the estate under the combined name. The final owner was Axel Erik Gabriel Påhlman-Stiernsparre, who died in 1979.

==== The Påhlmans Handelsinstitut (19th–20th centuries) ====
The Påhlman Brothers
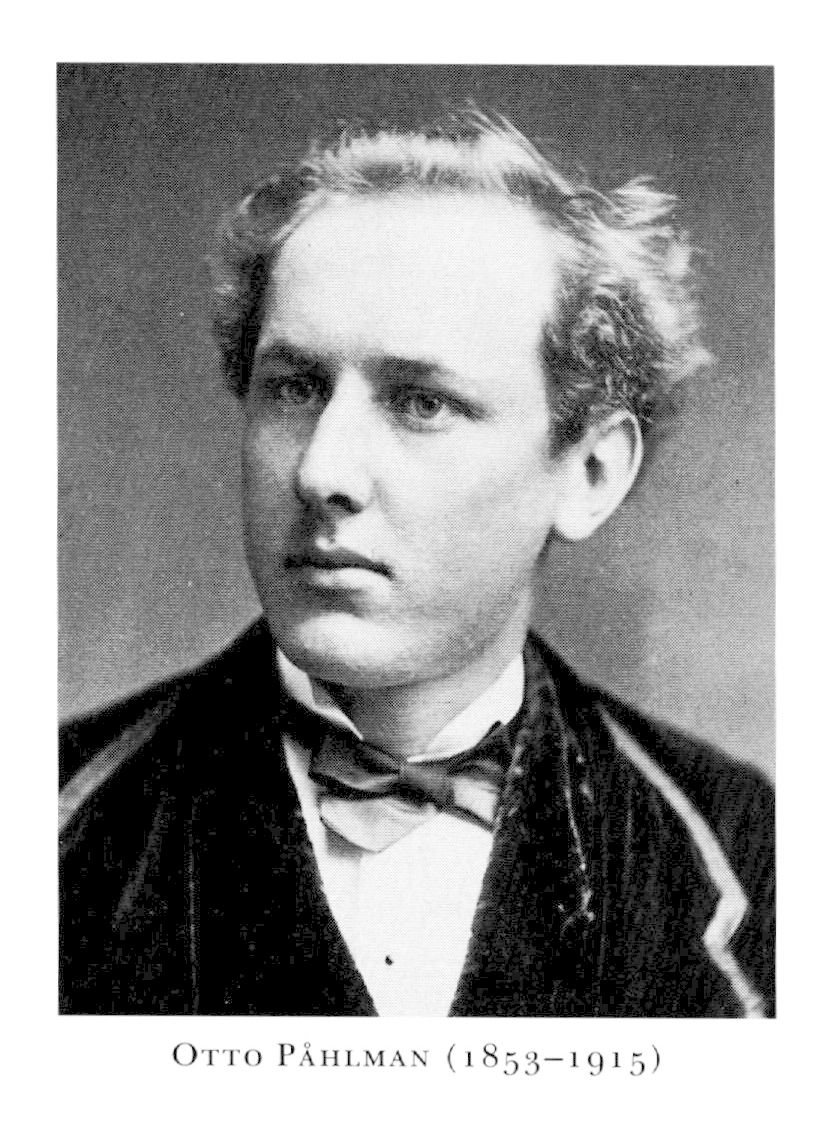
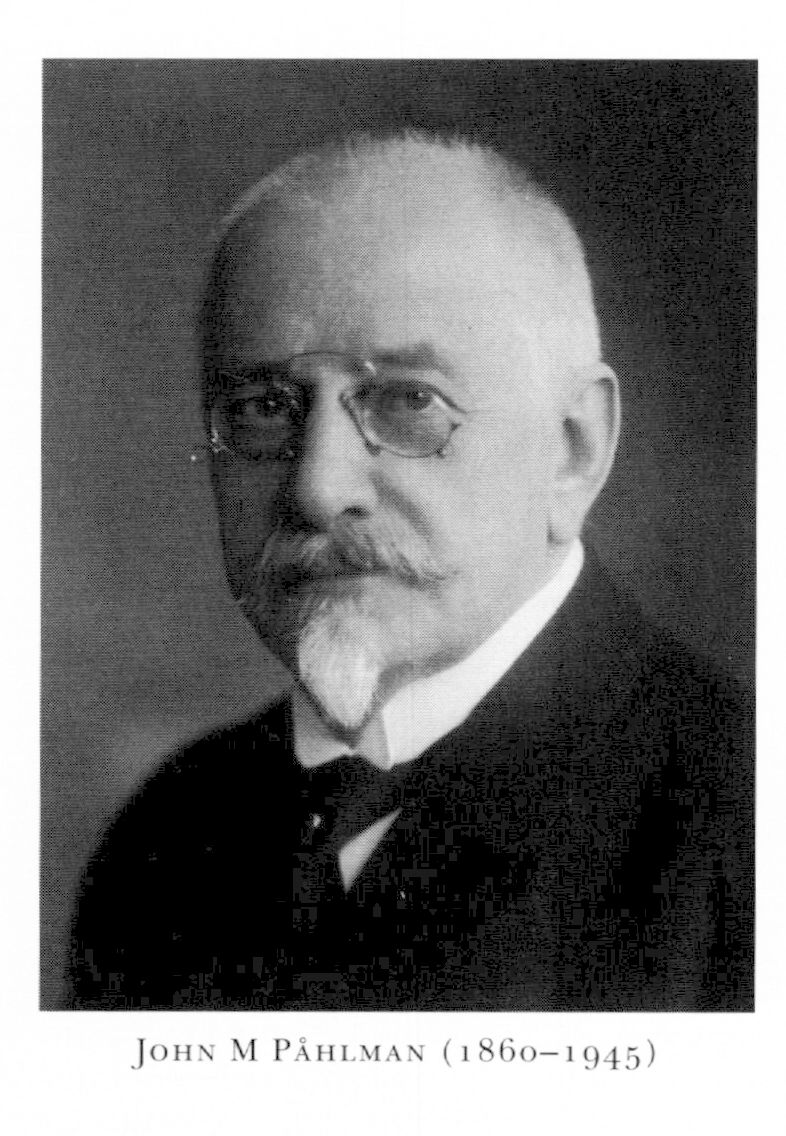
Brothers Otto (top) and John Magnus Påhlman, who co-founded the Handelsinstitut in 1881.

The family's most prominent contribution to Swedish civic life emerged in the field of education, beginning with the work of Otto Magnus Påhlman (1811–1873). After a military career, he became a writing instructor at the Imperial Cadet School in St. Petersburg. There, he developed a writing method called the Påhlmanska Skrivmetoden. The system was based on forming all letters from two simple shapes—a straight line and a semi-oval—which significantly simplified and shortened the time required to learn clear, even handwriting. The system became influential upon his return to Sweden, and he founded Påhlmans Skrivinstitutet in 1846 to teach his method.

In 1881, his sons, Otto Ottosson Påhlman (1853–1915) and John Magnus Påhlman (1860–1945), founded the Bröderna Påhlmans institutes (The Brothers Påhlman's Writing Institute) in Stockholm. They rationalized their father's method and soon expanded the curriculum beyond calligraphy to include business and accounting. The school was renamed Bröderna Påhlmans Handelsinstitut (The Påhlman Brothers' Commercial Institute) and quickly grew. The brothers divided the work; Otto established a successful, state-supported branch in Copenhagen, while John Magnus became the sole owner of the Stockholm school in 1891 and transformed it into a leading center for vocational training.

Under John Magnus's leadership, the institute pioneered a practical approach to business education. He introduced a popular one-year program focused on mercantile subjects taught in Swedish, making it more accessible than the traditional two-year courses at other institutions. Inspired by European schools, he established innovative practical training departments, including a "model office" (1899), a simulated bank with its own currency, and post and railway offices to give students hands-on experience. The institute's quality and modern approach earned it state subsidies in 1919, the first private business school in Sweden to receive such recognition.

The leadership of the institute remained a family affair for generations. In 1933, John Magnus's son, John Magnus Gösta Påhlman (1895–1963), a law graduate, became rector. He further broadened the curriculum, introducing the first courses in Sweden for traveling salesmen and telephone operators, as well as programs in retail, insurance, and social psychology with an emphasis on sales techniques. In 1962, he was succeeded by his son, Ragnar Påhlman (b. 1926), continuing the family's legacy in Swedish education.

=== Estonian branch ===
==== Establishment in Estonia (17th century) ====
The Estonian branch, which adopted the name von Pohlmann, descends from another of Jürgen the Elder's sons, Claus Pohlmann (d. c. 1696). Following the family's service to the Swedish Crown, Claus established the line as part of the landed gentry in Estonia, which was then a Swedish dominion. The family's status as significant landowners was demonstrated by their possession of numerous estates in the region, including Öötla (Öethel), Toila, Võrnu (Wörnuss), Sikeldi (Sicklecht), Kodila (Koddil), and Leevi (Lewer), and later Pall and Käru (Käsal). Records from the 17th century show Claus active as a cavalry captain (Rittmeister) and engaged in legal matters concerning these properties. The family's authority is further evidenced by a 1684 peasant petition to King Charles XI, which mentions a Lieutenant Pohlmann in a dispute over feudal obligations, cementing their role within the social structure of Swedish Estonia.

==== Service in the Russian Empire (18th century) ====
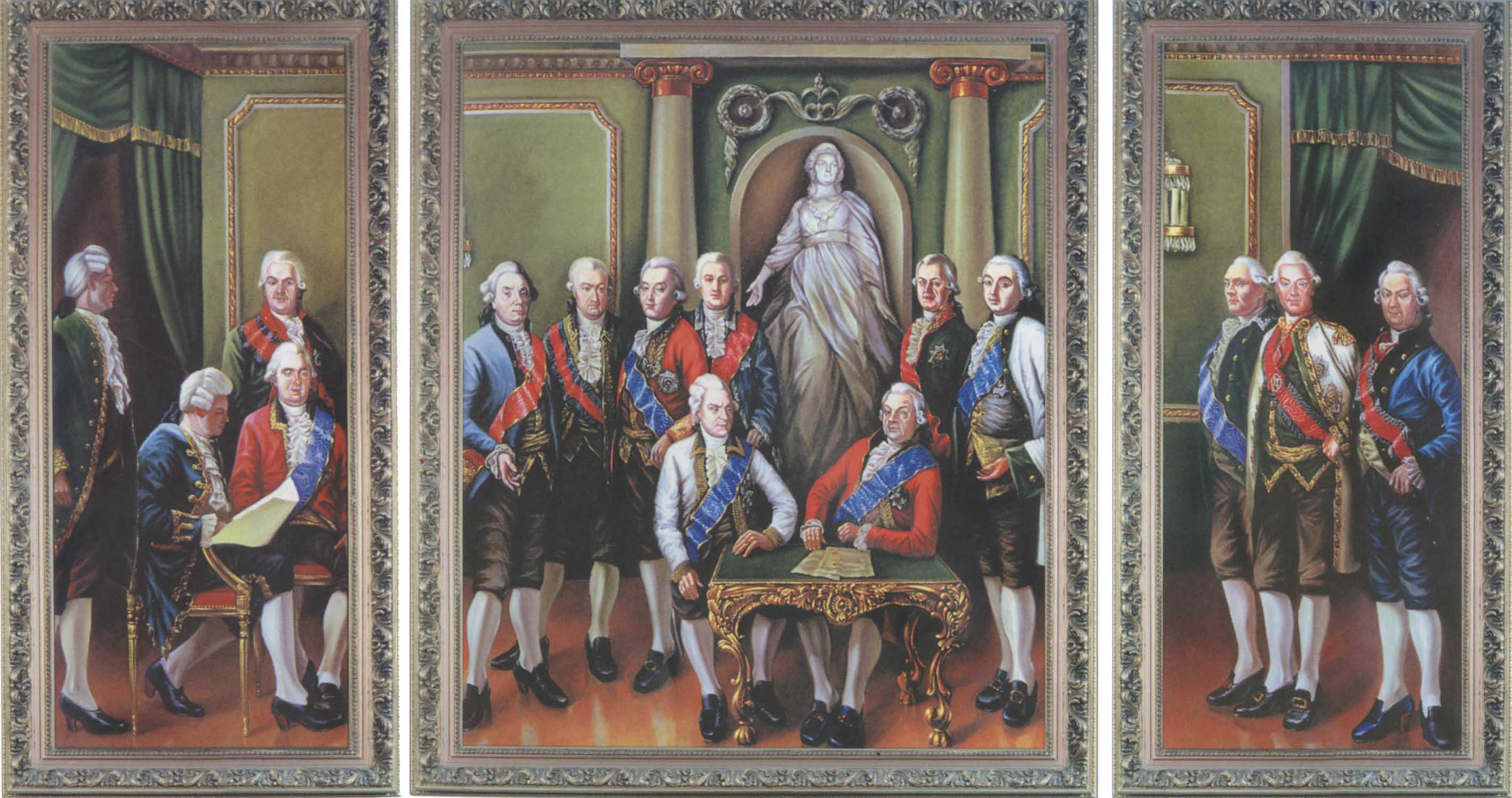
The 1765 founders of the Imperial Free Economic Society, with Reinhold Wilhelm von Pohlmann on the far left

Following the Great Northern War, Estonia was ceded to the Russian Empire, and the von Pohlmann family successfully transitioned their allegiance. The branch was matriculated in the Estonian Knighthood on 11 June 1746 in Class II under no. 112, cementing their status within the autonomous Baltic German nobility under Russian rule. In 1754, Reinhold Wilhelm von Pohlmann (Note: Also known as Romanovich Vilim in Russian and Renaud Guillaume de Pohlmann in French.) (1727–1795), along with his brothers Otto and Gustav, formally documented their noble origin before the Matriculum Commission. The family's influence was most prominent during the career of Reinhold Wilhelm von Pohlmann, who rose to prominence through decades of imperial service. His career saw a steady ascent through military and courtly ranks, from a lieutenant in 1752 to Gentleman of the Bedchamber (1761), Major General and Chamberlain (1765), Lieutenant General, and finally, Court Master of the Hunt (Jägermeister) in 1768, a position he held until his retirement.

Beyond his titles, Reinhold Wilhelm exerted significant civic and cultural influence at the highest levels of the Russian state. He was a trusted administrator for Empress Catherine the Great, serving as Chief Administrator of her summer palace, Tsarskoye Selo, and as a director of German colonization projects in Ingria. In 1765, he was a founding member of the influential Imperial Free Economic Society, an organization dedicated to modernizing the Russian economy and agriculture, and he served as its president in 1770. His skill and the Empress's trust in him were most visibly demonstrated when he was chosen to supervise the entire construction of Gatchina Palace for Catherine's favourite, Grigory Orlov. For his long service to the state, he was awarded high honours, including the Order of St. Anna by Emperor Peter III of Russia and the Order of St. George by Catherine the Great.

==== The Lohde Castle Stewardship (1786—1788) ====
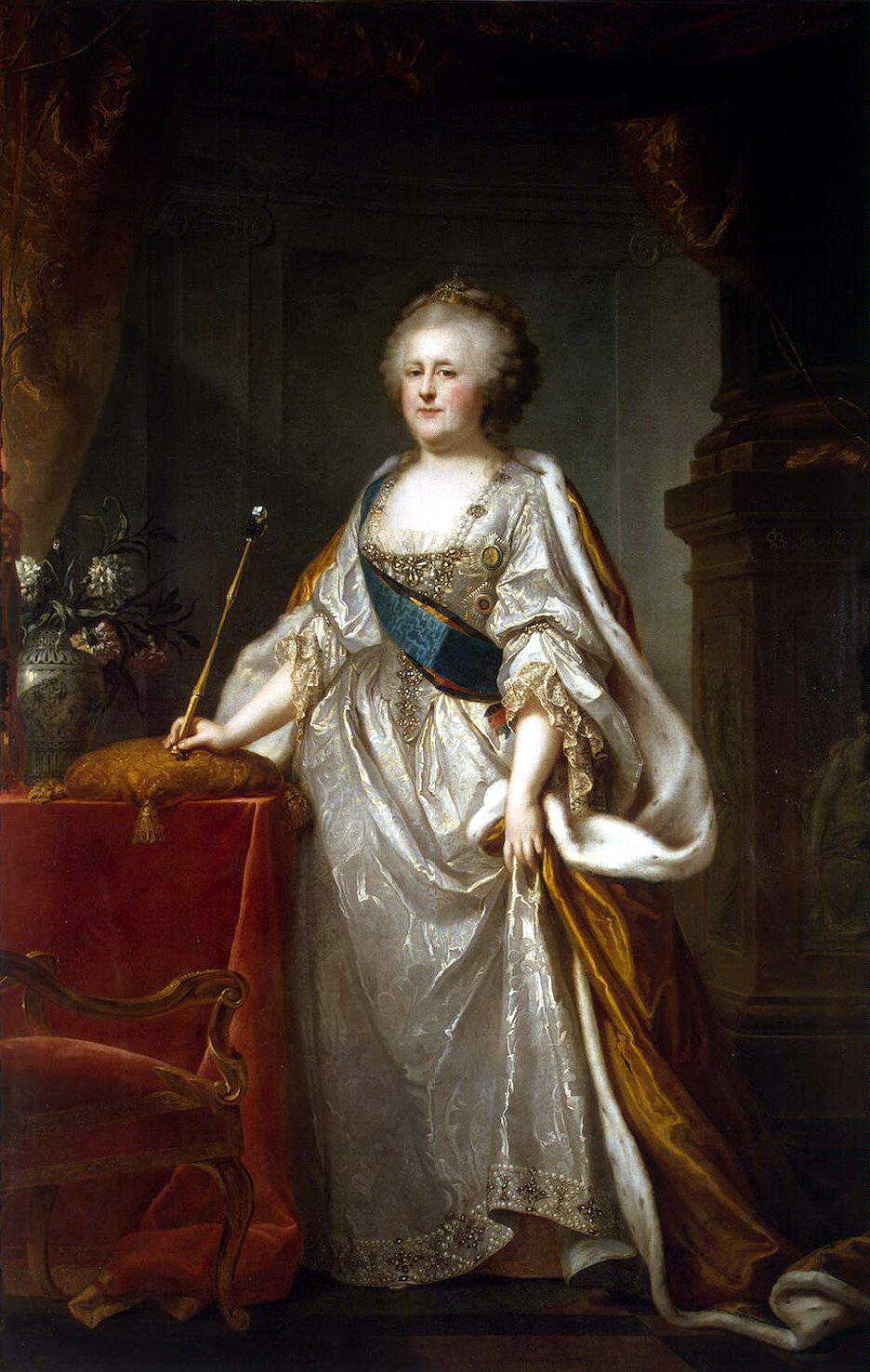
Empress Catherine the Great, who appointed von Pohlmann as the Duchess's guardian.

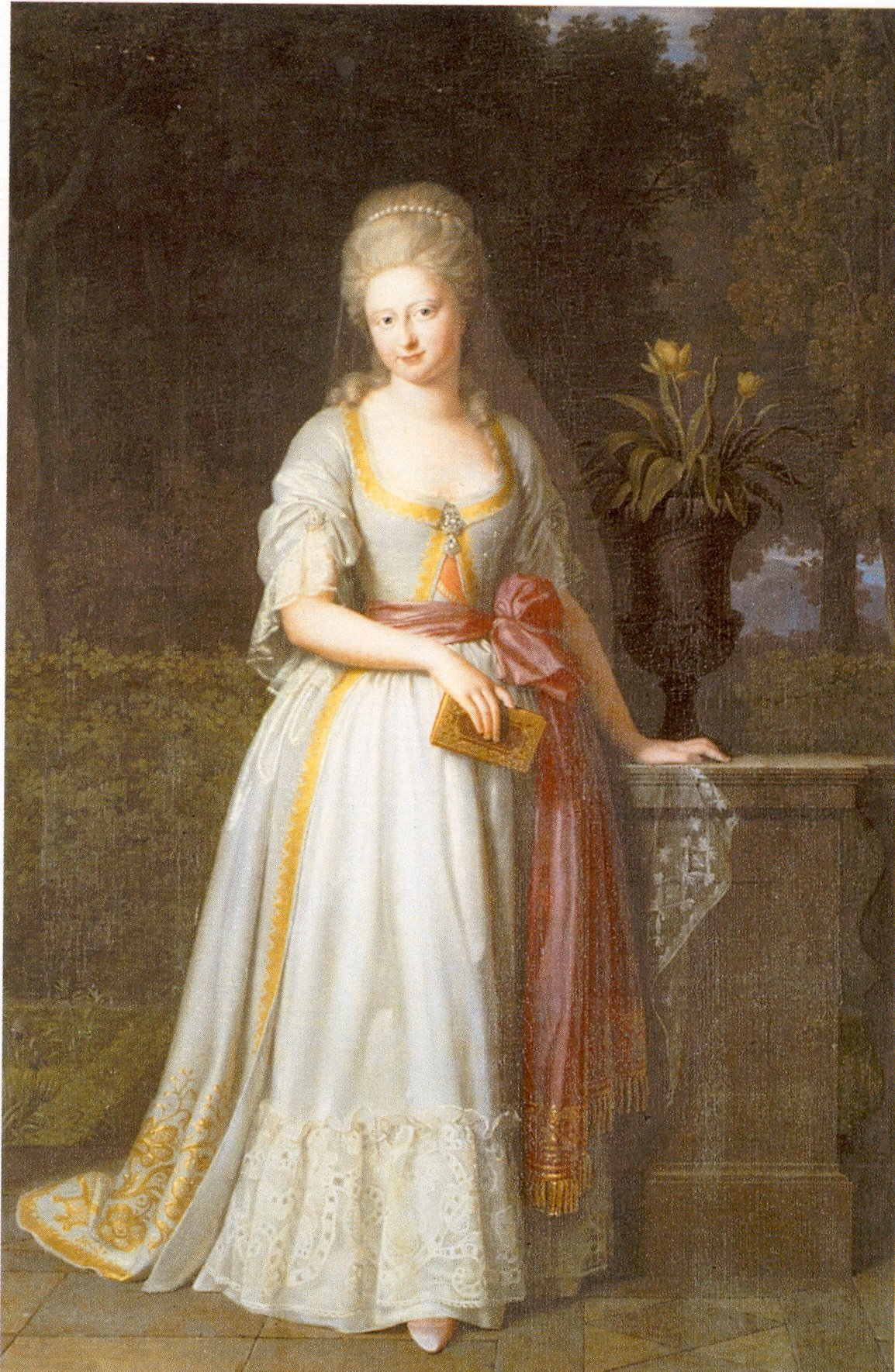
Duchess Augusta of Brunswick-Wolfenbüttel, who sought refuge from her husband.

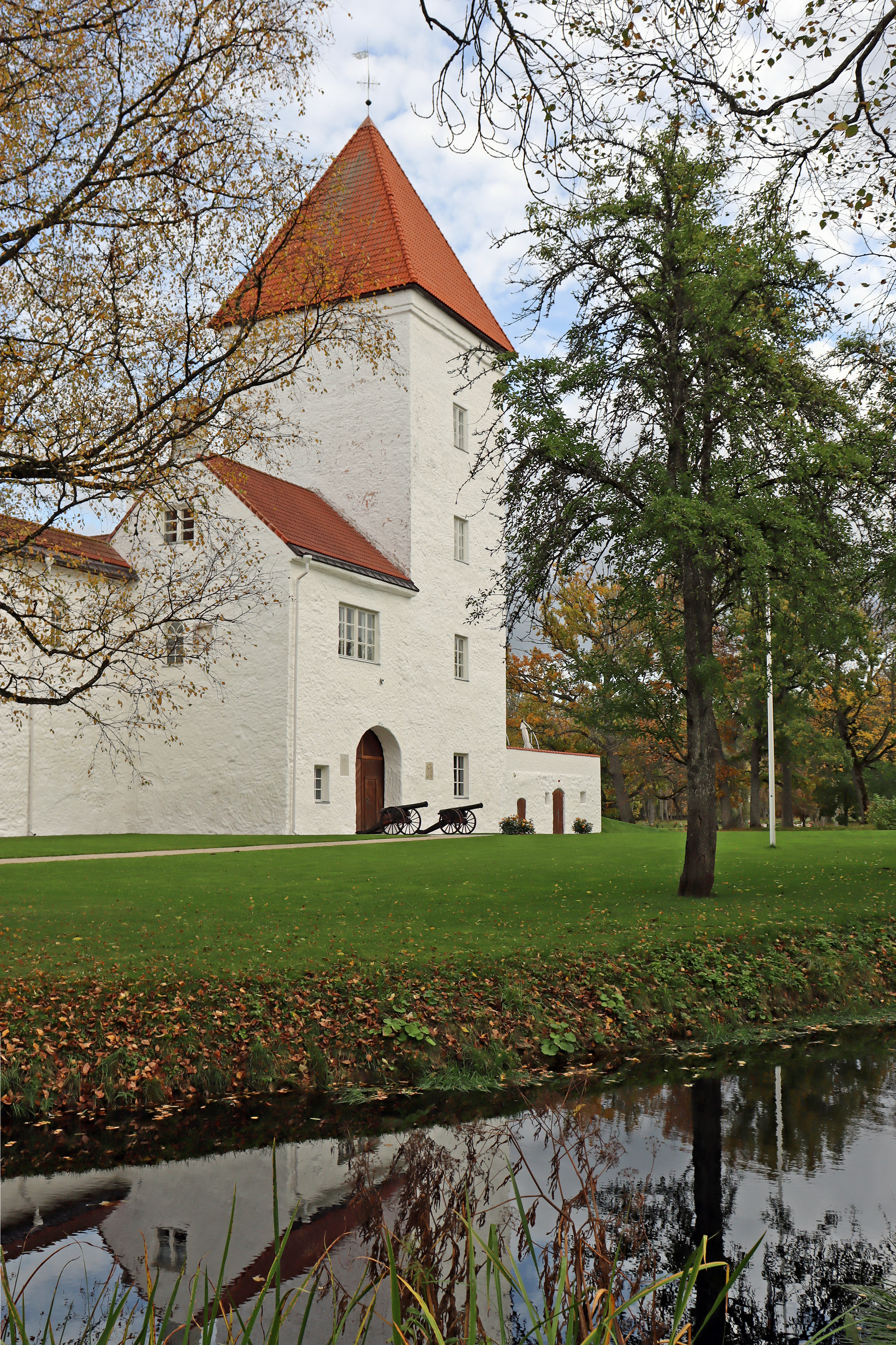
Koluvere Castle, the estate where the Duchess lived under guardianship and died in 1788.

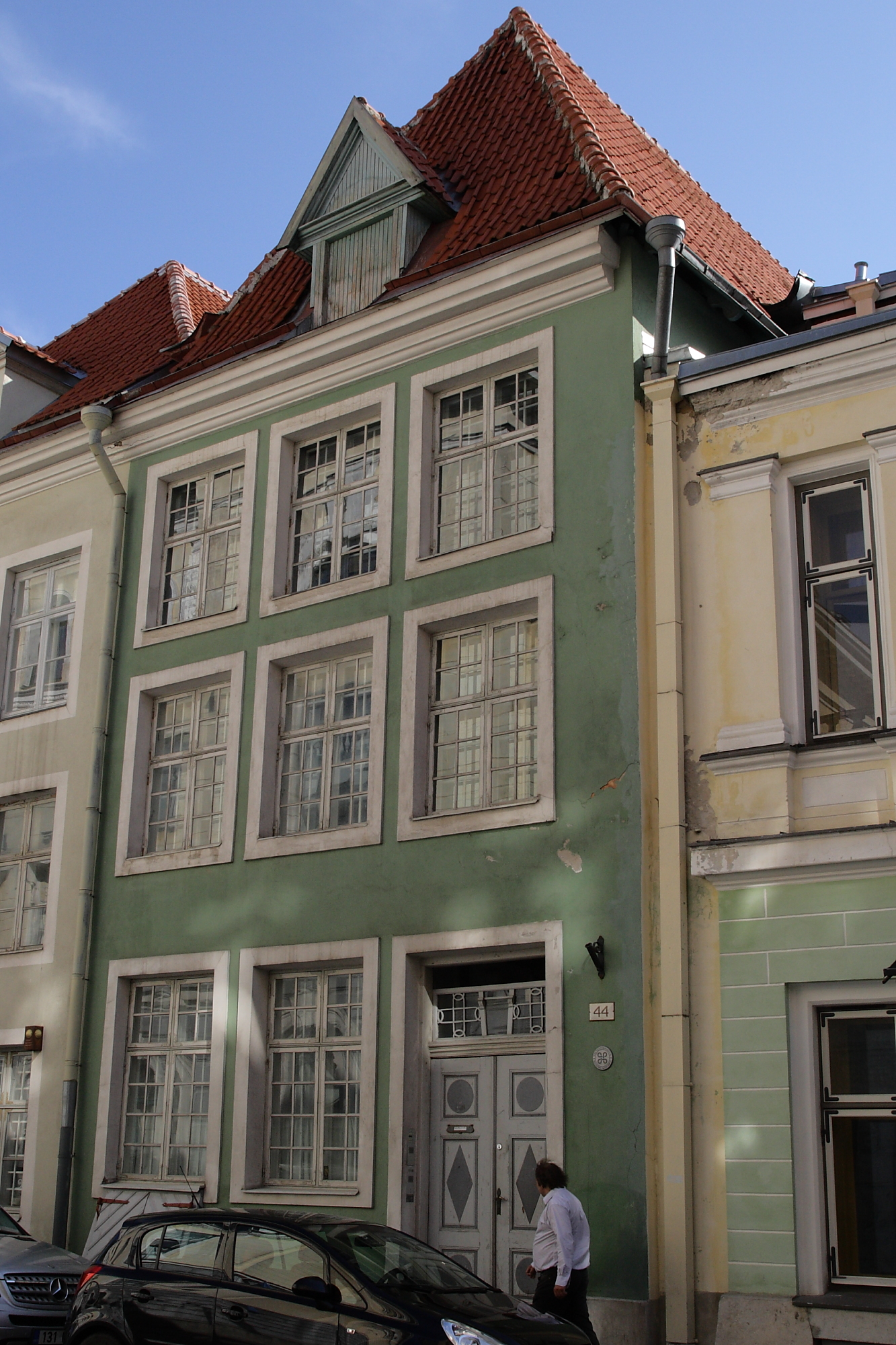
von Pohlmann's house on Tallinn's Pikk Street, which served as the winter residence for the Duchess.

In retirement, Reinhold Wilhelm's reputation for being "careful and prudent," as noted by the Empress, (Note: In a letter to Baron Melchior von Grimm, Empress Catherine the Great wrote: "I am very glad that you are satisfied with what I have done for him, and that my friend Pohlmann, whom you knew by his prudence, thwarted the shenanigans of the dad and husband." (Grot 1878, p. 440).) led to a sensitive assignment. In 1786, Catherine the Great personally summoned him to become the steward of Lohde Castle and the guardian of Duchess Augusta of Brunswick-Wolfenbüttel. The Duchess had sought refuge at the Russian court from her husband, Prince Frederick I of Württemberg, citing abuse.

"I am very glad that you are satisfied with what I have done for him, and that my friend Pohlmann, whom you knew by his prudence, thwarted the shenanigans of the dad and husband."

— Empress Catherine the Great, in a letter to Baron Melchior von Grimm, 19 April 1788

Pohlmann's role was to provide a secluded, protective household, managing the estate's revenues to ensure the Duchess's security and comfort.

In September 1788, the stewardship ended when the Duchess died suddenly at the castle from what was reported as a severe hemorrhage. The unclear circumstances of her death gave rise to damaging rumors, which suggested that the elderly Pohlmann was her lover and that she had died from a secret pregnancy he was trying to conceal.

Though there was no evidence to support these claims, the scandal tarnished Pohlmann's public reputation for the remainder of his life. The truth of the matter was not confirmed until 1819, when a discreet enquiry ordered by the Duchess's own son—by then the King of Württemberg—had her coffin opened. The examination found no traces of a child or pregnancy, posthumously clearing Pohlmann's name. However, as the findings were not made public, the slanderous rumors persisted in some historical accounts.

The Estonian branch of the von Pohlmann family continued for another century, eventually becoming extinct in the male line in 1898.

=== Prussian branch ===
Not much is known about the Prussian branch of the family, but records confirm the existence of both titled and untitled noble lines in Prussian service. An archival record from 1736 documents that a von Pohlmann (also spelled Pollmann), who served as the Royal Prussian Privy Councilor and Resident in the Westphalian Circle, was granted the rank of Imperial Baron (German: Reichsfreiherr). Nineteenth-century nobility lexicons refer to this diplomat with the initials "R. v. P". or as "N. v. Pohlmann", noting the diploma was granted around 1735. One source identifies a Royal Prussian Privy Councilor and Envoy to Regensburg named Adam Heinrich Pollmann who was ennobled by the King of Prussia in 1740.

Later records mention an untitled noble Pohlmann family of military officers in East Prussia, with a presence in the Angerburg district. One member of this line is noted as a captain in the von Greiffenberg Fusilier Battalion who died in 1819.

== Estates and manors ==
=== Ugglansryd ===
Originally a farm that was owned by the church during the Middle Ages, Ugglansryd passed to the Crown, and in the 1550s was in the possession of King Gustav Vasa. Located in the historically rich Sunnerbo district of Småland, the estate was praised for its scenic beauty, situated by Lake Stensjön and surrounded by islands. In 1559, the king leased the farm to Gunnar Galle the Elder, who, along with his brothers Jöran Jonsson Galle and Per Jonsson Galle, established it as a manor. Ownership within the Galle family was complex, with the property being sold to Nils Isaksson Bagge in 1577 before being redeemed for Gunnar Galle's underage children the same year.

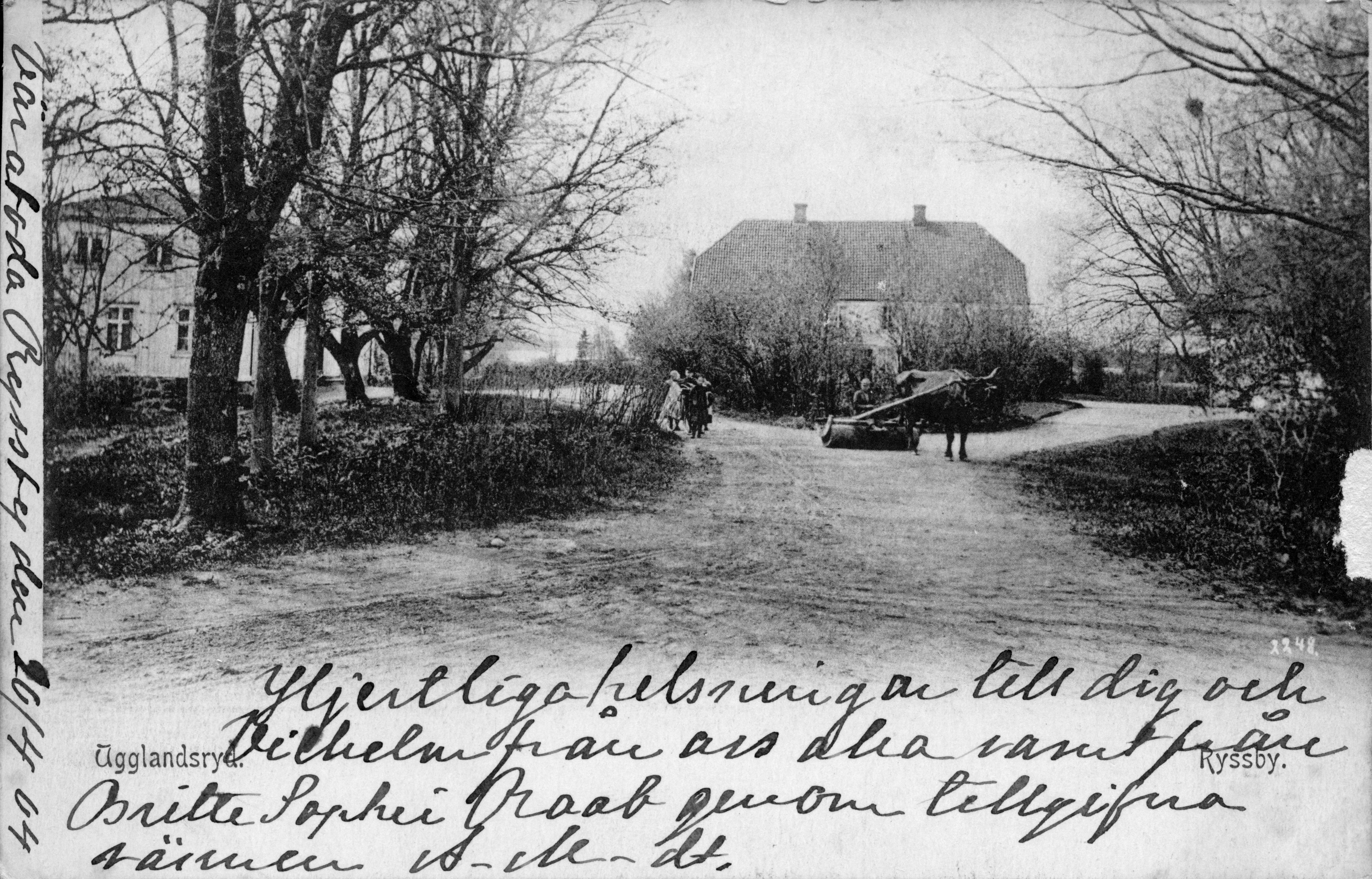
A postcard of Ugglansryd manor in 1904 when it was owned by Brita Sofia Raab, in Ryssby, Sweden.

The manor came into the Påhlman family's possession around 1623 through the marriage of Major Jöran Polman the Younger to Christina Lilliesparre, a descendant of the Galle family. After Jöran's death, the estate was held by his widow until it passed to their son, Johan Påhlman (d. 1693). During this period, the manor was ravaged by fire in the early 1680s. Following Johan's death, his widow, Margareta Silfversparre (d. 1716), managed the estate. She contested the Crown's attempt to reclaim the property during the Great Reduction under King Charles XI, writing a forceful petition to the royal commission in 1707 as "a very sad widow" to successfully retain her family's ownership.

The estate remained in the Påhlman family for several more generations, passing to her son, Lieutenant Colonel Carl Gustaf Påhlman, and then to his son, Anders Otto Påhlman. In 1783, Anders Otto rebuilt the main building (corps de logis) in the typical Carolean manor style, with a broken roof and a prominent location on the slope of Lake Stensjön's shore. A local legend, associated with a long peninsula extending from the manor's park, tells of an ancient owner who wagered he could build a bridge across the lake to the neighbouring Stensnäs manor faster than a rival nobleman could build a church. The bridge-builder failed, and the peninsula and a chain of islets are said to be the remains of his ambitious but unfinished project.

Ugglansryd remained in the Påhlman family for 175 years until Anders Otto Påhlman sold it in 1798 to Baron Axel Engelbrekt Raab. The property subsequently passed through several owners in the 19th and 20th centuries. The historic manor house was ultimately demolished in 1961.

=== Öötla ===
Öötla (German: Oethel), first mentioned as the village of Otele in the 14th century, was established as a manor in the 17th century in Peetri Parish, Järvamaa County. The lands were granted to Jürgen Polman the Elder for lifelong use in 1623 and confirmed as a heritable fief for the von Pohlmann family by King Gustavus Adolphus in 1631.

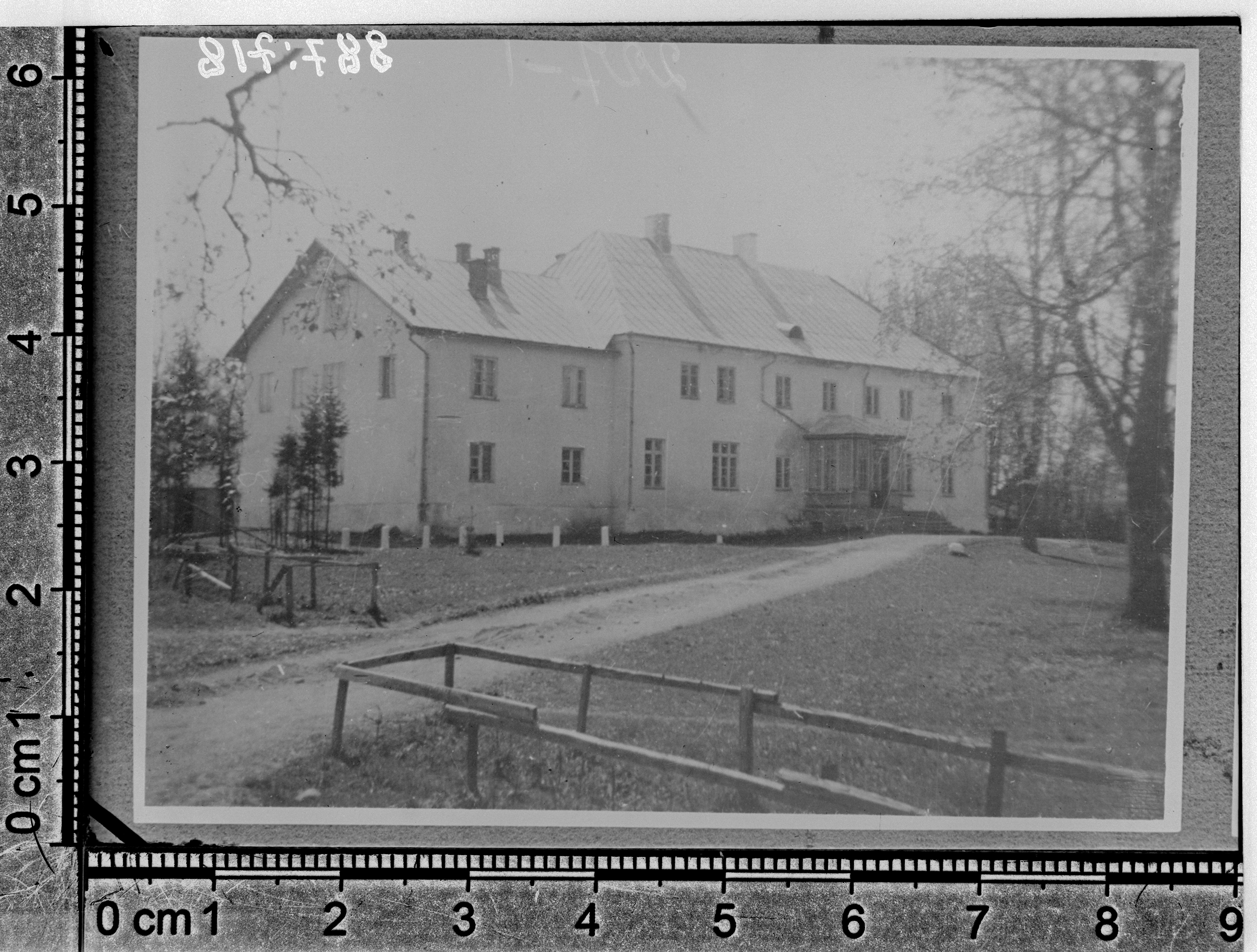
The front of the main building of Öötla Manor (Oethel), 1938.

From the late 17th century, the property was divided into two separate estates: Suur-Öötla (Great Öötla) and Väike-Öötla (Little Öötla). After facing financial difficulties, Jürgen's son Claus Pohlmann and his heirs lost direct control of the properties, which passed through several hands, including the von Drenteln and von Lode families. By the mid-18th century, the Pohlmann family, specifically Reinhold Wilhelm von Pohlmann, began a lengthy legal process to reclaim their ancestral estate.

This effort culminated in the 1770s when Reinhold Wilhelm von Pohlmann, by then a Lieutenant General and Master of the Hunt in Russian service, successfully reacquired both properties. He secured Suur-Öötla from the von Essen family in 1770 and purchased Väike-Öötla in 1772. However, he sold the newly reunited manor just a year later, in 1773, to Justizrat Niclas Friedrich von Hagmann for 20,000 silver roubles.

The estate remained with the von Hagmann family until 1806, when it was sold to Otto Gustav von Stackelberg. This marked the beginning of a long period of ownership by the von Stackelberg family, who held the manor for over a century. The last registered owner before the Estonian land reforms was Alexander von Stackelberg. The manor's two-story Baroque main building, constructed in the 1760s, still stands today.

=== Ågården ===
Ågården was established as a manor in 1492 by the National Councillor (Riksråd) Sigge Larsson Sparre af Rossvik, who constructed a stone house on the property. This original building was burned down by Danish forces during the Kalmar War in the early 17th century. It was replaced by the current main building, a well-preserved two-story Carolean log house stained in a traditional red. In its early history, the estate passed through a number of noble families, including the Krumme, Bååt, Månesköld af Seglinge, Kafle, and Kagg families.

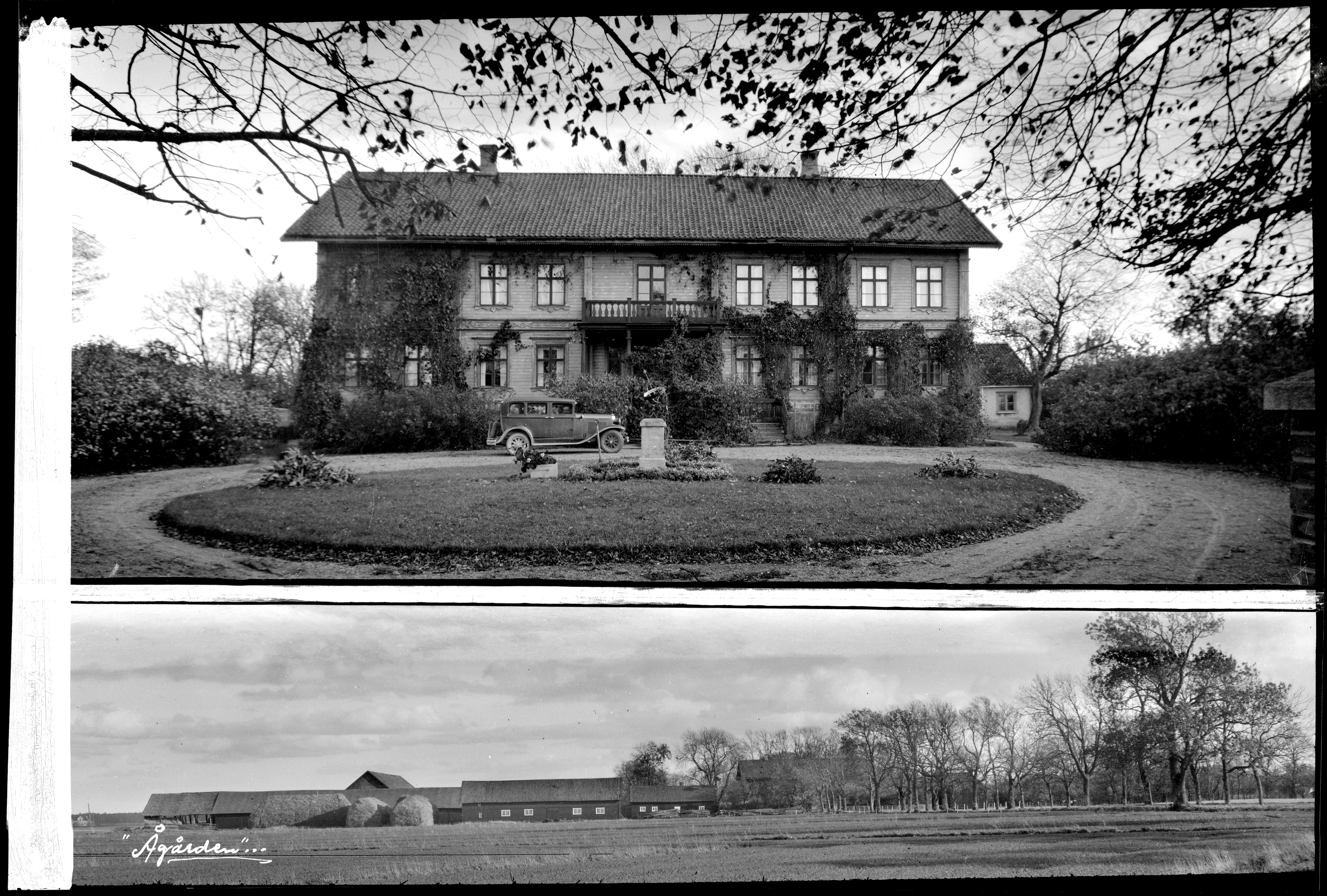
A composite image from c. 1940s showing the main building of Ågården manor (top) and the associated farm (bottom).

A significant era for the manor began in 1746 when it was acquired by Major General and Governor Lorentz Christoffer Stobée. A man of culture, Stobée modernised the interior from Baroque to Rococo, installed hand-painted wallpaper with bird motifs in a room known as the "Bird Room", and amassed a large collection of books and portraits. Notably, this collection included a copy of the portrait of the family's progenitor, Jürgen Polman the Elder, which was displayed above the Italian marble fireplace and was painted after the original at Karlberg Palace.

After Stobée's death in 1756, his widow, Catharina Margareta Loos, remarried Court Marshal Axel Magnus Stiernsparre in 1762. In 1786, Stiernsparre established Ågården as a fideikommiss (a family trust or entail). He included a unique proviso: anticipating that his own male line would become extinct, any subsequent heir from a different family would be legally required to add the name "Stiernsparre" to their own surname. As predicted, the Stiernsparre line died out, and the fideikommiss passed first through the Silfversparre family and then to the Påhlman family. The last owner under the trust was Axel Erik Gabriel Påhlman-Stiernsparre, who died in 1979, thus ending the Påhlman-Stiernsparre branch's connection to the estate.

=== List of properties ===
Estate	Location	Acquired	First Owner	Notes
Piigandi (Pigant) Manor	Estonia	c. 1598	Jürgen Polman the Elder	Held briefly before the area returned to Polish control.
Wasamma & Arrakyll	Estonia	c. 1614	Wilhelm Polman (heirs of)	Held by his heirs as of 1614.
Tuttomäggi Manor	Estonia	c. 1615	Jürgen Polman the Elder	Acquired through a transfer and held for a brief period.
Ugglansryd Manor	Sweden	c. 1623	Jöran Polman the Younger	Acquired through marriage; remained in the family for 175 years.
Öötla (Oethel) Manor	Estonia	1624	Jürgen Polman the Elder	First held as a fief, later a donation. Became the primary seat of the Estonian branch.
Prästeboda	Sweden	1624	Jöran Polman the Younger	Granted as a donation; recovered by the Crown in 1683 but later returned to the family.
Kvänjarp Södregård	Sweden	1626	Jöran Polman the Younger	Granted as a donation; later recovered by the Crown.
S. Björkerås	Sweden	1651	Anna Christina Påhlman	Became a manor for her; she traded it the following year.
Väraboda	Sweden	1652	Anna Christina Påhlman	Later held by her brother Johan and his son, Karl Gustaf Påhlman.
Läsaryd	Sweden	1659	Johan Påhlman	Purchased in 1659; possessed by his heirs at the end of the century.
Lilla Hindsekind	Sweden	c. 1664	Anna Christina Påhlman	Owned following the death of her cousin.
Gällaryd	Sweden	1666	Margareta Silfversparre	Inherited by the wife of Johan Påhlman.
Hofgut von Oeynhausen	Westphalia	1699	Susanna Pohlmann	Acquired with her husband, Colonel von Oeynhausen. Later known as Reimlers Hof.
Ågården Manor	Sweden	c. 1762	Axel Magnus Stiernsparre	Acquired by marriage; became a fideikommiss leading to the Påhlman-Stiernsparre branch.
Sicklecht Manor	Estonia	1752	Reinhold Wilhelm von Pohlmann	Acquired through his wife's family.
Kodila (Koddil) Manor	Estonia	1772	Reinhold Wilhelm von Pohlmann	Purchased for 40,000 roubles.
44 Pikk tn, Tallinn	Estonia	1777	Reinhold Wilhelm von Pohlmann	Purchased for 7,000 silver roubles; served as the winter residence for Duchess Augusta.
Ryd Passagård	Sweden	1783	Anders Otto Påhlman	Held from 1783 to 1793.
Sunnerå	Sweden	1794	Johan Magnus Påhlman	Acquired in 1794.
Deranäs	Sweden	1795	Anders Otto Påhlman	Held from 1795 to 1803.
Pall and Lewes Manors	Estonia	c. 1853	Gregor von Pohlmann	Owned as of 1853.
Hångers Lillegård	Sweden	1857	Karl Adam Påhlman	Held from 1857 to 1859.
Wosel Manor	Estonia	c. 1894	Leopoldine von Pohlmann	Possessed as of 1894.
Toila and Woernus Manors	Estonia	Unknown	Estonian branch	Listed among the estates owned by the von Pohlmann family.

== Coat of arms ==
The family's history across different regions resulted in numerous variations of its coat of arms and seals. Despite this, the arms of the family's main branches share the principal charge of an armoured arm. The earliest known version, associated with the family in Westphalia, featured this arm holding a ring. Swedish armorials note that this original charge may have been the basis for the later cannonball, suggesting a ring could have been misinterpreted as a ball over time.

When the Swedish branch was ennobled as Påhlman in 1650, the arms were officially blazoned in their Letter of Arms (Swedish: sköldebrev). The description specifies:

″...A yellow Shield, therein an armed Arm, having in the hand a Ball or Cannonball: On top of the Shield an open Tourney helmet; The wreath and Mantling with White, blue and yellow divided: On the helmet a growing oak twig with three Acorns between two Wings... (Note: From the original 1650 shiled letter (Swedish: Sköldebrevet), transcribed by Karin Borgkvist Ljung, 2017 for Riddarhuset.)

The Estonian von Pohlmann branch uses a similar arms, though blazons vary. Siebmacher's Armorial describes the arms as a gold shield with a blue armored arm holding a blue ball. In contrast, the Genealogisches Handbuch der estländischen Ritterschaft (Genological Handbook of the Estonian Knighthood) describes the shield as grey (in grau). Both branches share a similar crest: three golden acorns on a green stalk between a pair of open black wings.

A distinct German variation from the 18th century is also recorded, where the principal charge is replaced by three eagles.

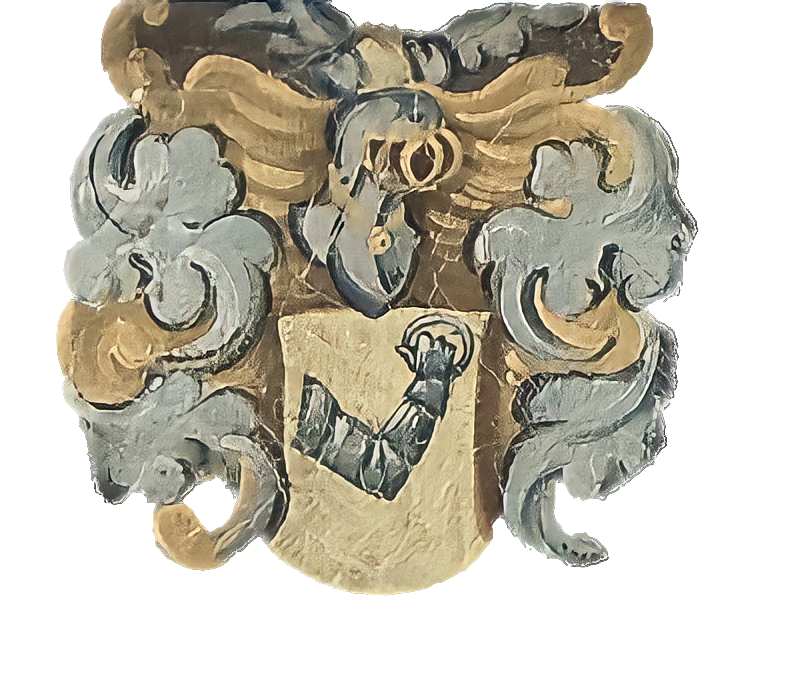
Coat of arms with an arm holding a ring from 1623 portrait of Jöran Polman

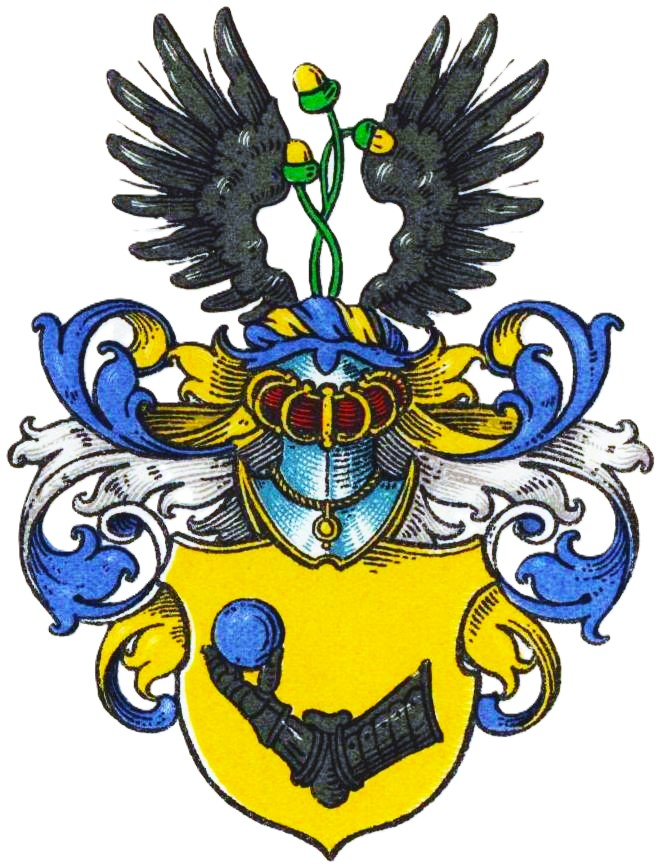
Pohlmann coat of arms from Wappenbuch des Westfälischen Adels

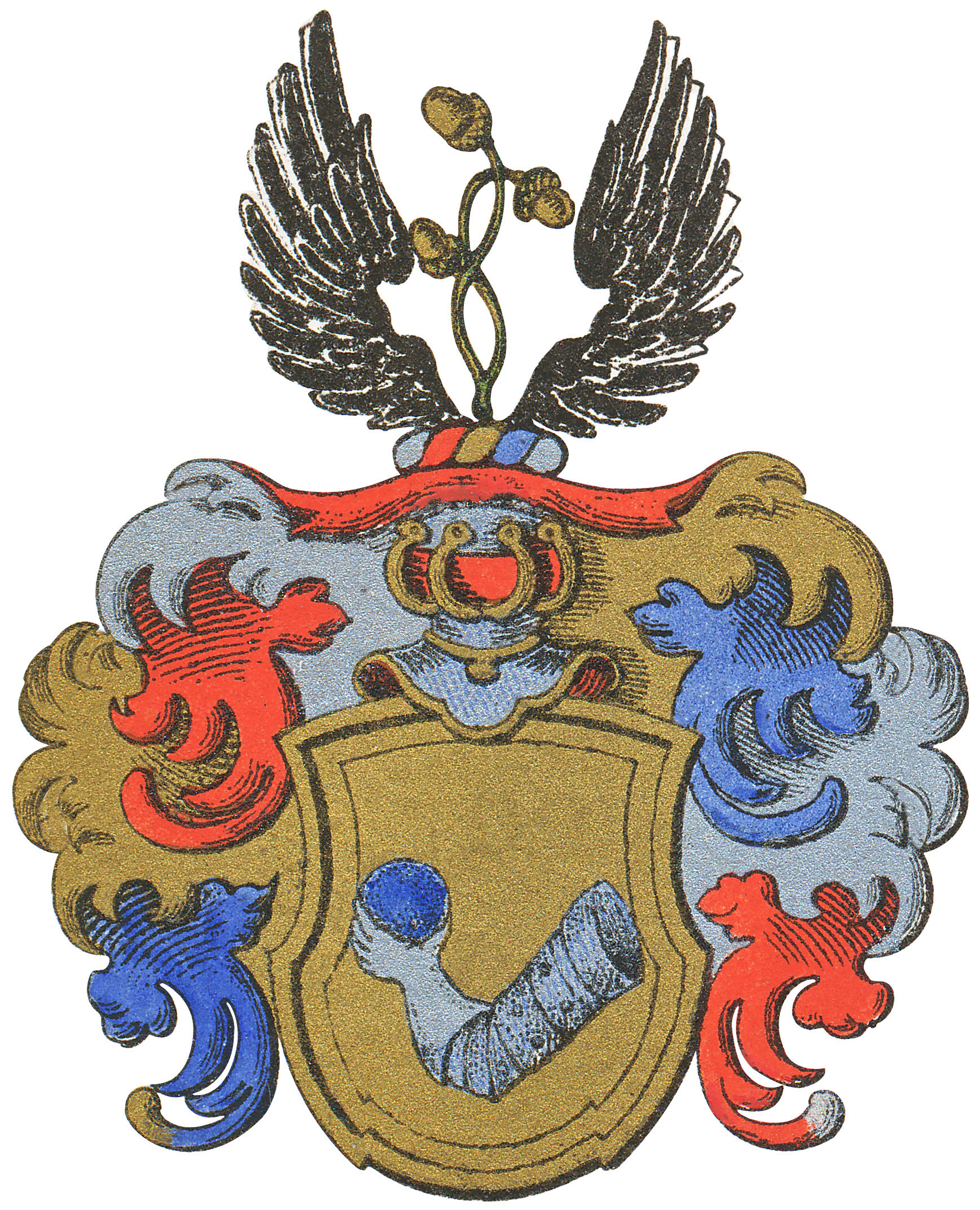
Påhlman Swedish coat of arms from Stiernstedt och Klingspors vapenbok

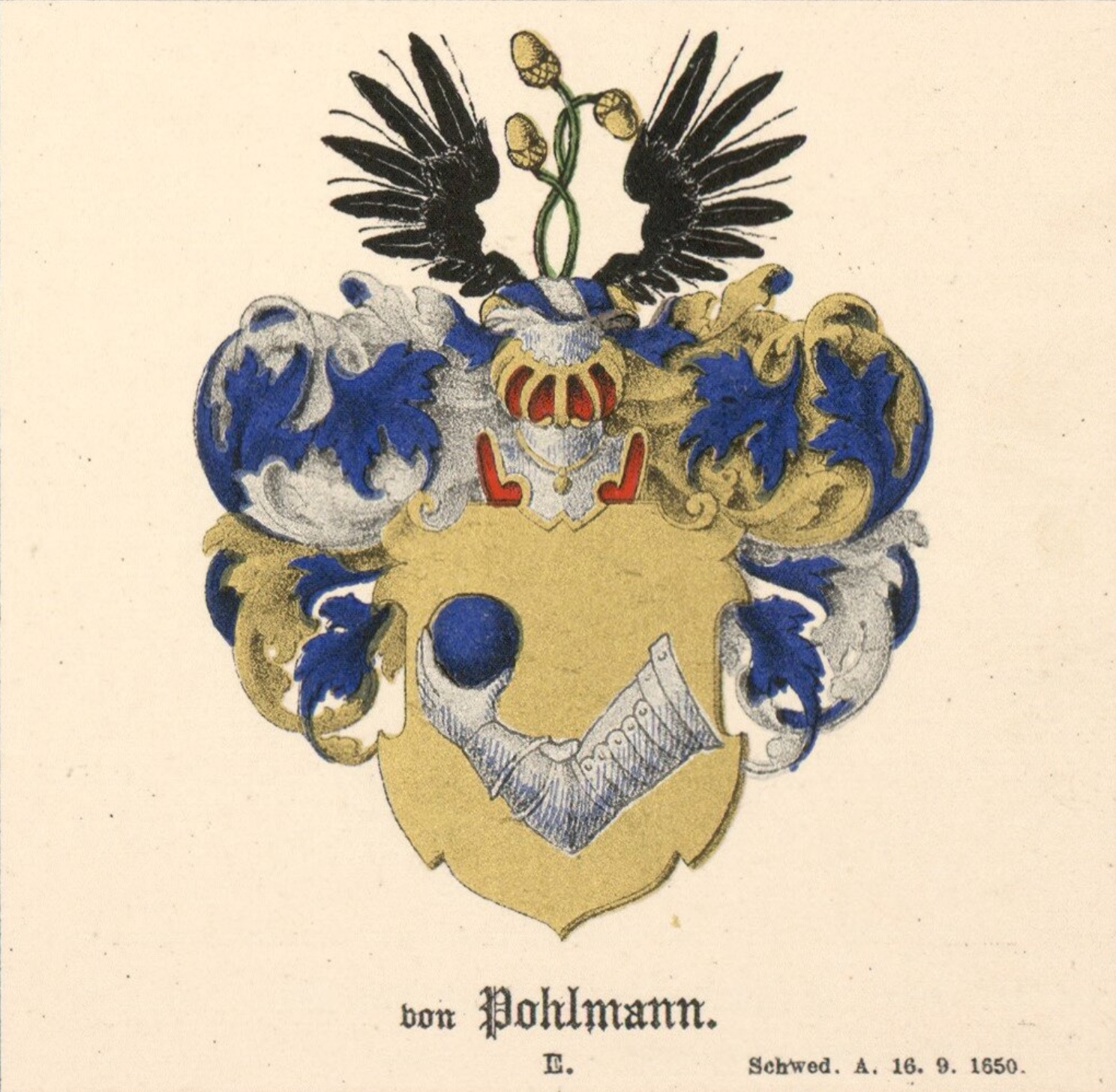
von Pohlmann Baltic coat of arms from Baltisches Wappenbuch

== Genealogy ==
- 1. Hans Polman, County Clerk at Padis (Swedish: Amtsskriver). ⚭ Margarete
  - 2. Jürgen (Göran) Polman the Elder († c. 1641), Governor and Commander (Swedish: ståthållare och befallningsman) at Padis, Captain (German: hauptmann) at Anzen in Livland, of Pigant, Kannapäh parish, Dorpat 1598. ⚭ 1: Anna Wesell ⚭ 2: Gertrud von Bremen
    - 3. Jöran Polman the Younger (1597 — † bef. 1636), Captain (Swedish: Kapten) of the Kronoberg Regiment 1623, Major. ⚭ c. 1623 Christina Lilliesparre (af Fylleskog, no. 44)
    - 3. Claus Pohlmann († after 1676), Cavalry Captain (Swedish: Ryttmästare), of Oethel.
      - 4. Otto Gustav von Pohlmann († c. 1710). ⚭ 1: Gertrud Helena von Grünewaldt ⚭ 2: Gertrude Maria von Derfelden ⚭ 3: Anna Margaretha von Aderkas
        - 5. Reinhold Wilhelm von Pohlmann ⚭ Charlotte von Brackel
          - 6. Reinhold Wilhelm von Pohlmann (1727–1795), Lieutenant General (German: Generalleutnant) in Russian service, Court Chamberlain (German: Kammerherr), and Master of the Hunt (German: Jägermeister). ⚭ 1751 Baroness Dorothea Johanna von Wrangel
    - 3. Henrik Johan Polman, Ensign (Swedish: Fänrik:), De la Gardie's Infantry Regiment.
      - 4. Johan Påhlman († 1693), Cavalry Captain (Swedish: Ryttmästare) of the Småland cavalry, Leader in the nobles' cavalry regiment (Note: The Swedish title is Anförare vid adelsfaneregimentet) against Denmark 1644, of Ugglansryd, Sunnerå & Väraboda. ⚭ Margareta Silfversparre (no. 99)
        - 5. Carl Gustaf Påhlman (1679–1757), Lieutenant Colonel (Swedish: Överstelöjtnant) of the Kronoberg Regiment, of Ugglansryd, Sunnerå & Väraboda. ⚭ 1730 Christina Elisabet Renner
          - 6. Anders Otto Påhlman (1740–1815), of Ugglansryd. ⚭ Christina Margareta Unge
          - 6. Adolf Fredrik Påhlman (1743–1825), Colonel (Swedish: Överste). ⚭ Margareta Elisabet Ankarcrona (no. 1965)
          - 6. Johan Magnus Påhlman (1741–1797), Captain (Swedish: Kapten). ⚭ Margareta Helena Stålhammar (no. 496)
      - 4. Gustaf Påhlman († 1695), Cavalry Captain (Swedish: Ryttmästare'). ⚭ Christina Svenske (no. 258)
      - 4. Anna Christina Påhlman († by 1684), of Väraboda. ⚭ Major Jöns Eriksson Silfwerbrand (no. 508)
    - 3. Fredrik Polman
  - 2. Wilhelm Polman († bef. 1614), Cavalryman (Swedish: Ryttare), of Wasamma and Arrakiil.
  - 2. Johann Polman (fl. 1587–1601), Councillor (German: Ratsverwandter) in Riga.

This genealogical tree is based on the following sources:

- Elgenstierna, Gustaf. Den introducerade svenska adelns ättartavlor. Vol. 6. Stockholm: P. A. Norstedt & Söners Förlag, 1930.
- Siebmacher, J. Grosses Und Allgemeines Wappenbuch. Bd. 3, Abth. 11: Der Adel Der Russischen Ostseeprovinzen.
- Stackelberg, Otto Magnus von. Genealogisches Handbuch der estländischen Ritterschaft. Vol. 2. Görlitz, 1930.
- Wrangel, Fredrik Ulrik & Bergström, Otto. Svenska Adelns Ättartaflor ifran ar 1857. Vol. 2. Stockholm: P. A. Norstedt & Söners Förlag, 1897.

== Legacy ==
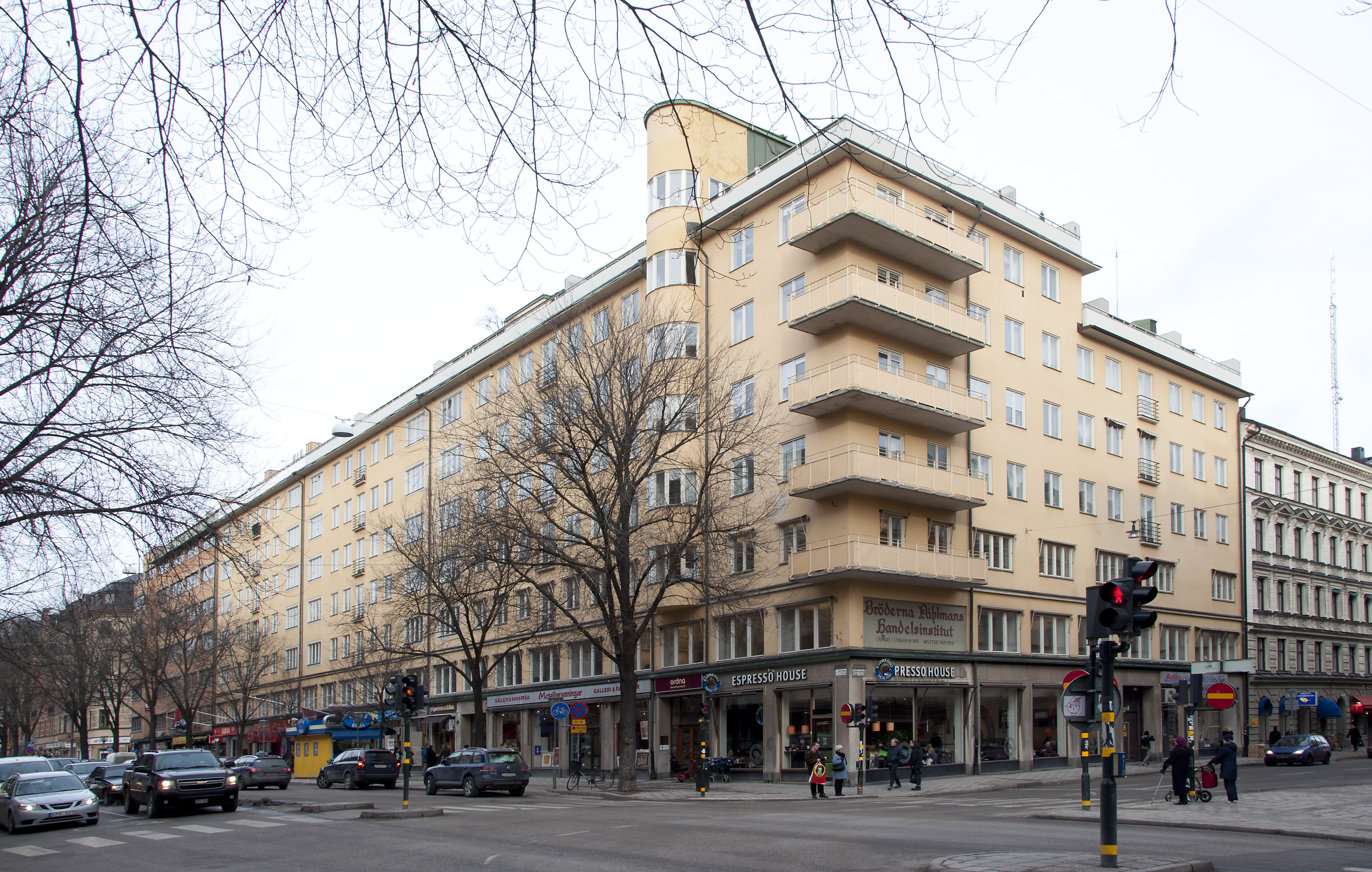
Påhlmans Handelsinstitut at Sveavägen in Stockholm

A prominent public legacy of the family is the Påhlmans Handelsinstitut (Påhlman's Business Institute) in Stockholm. Founded in 1881 and based on an innovative writing method developed by their father, Otto Magnus Påhlman, the school remains a leading institution for vocational education in Sweden. A significant artifact of the family's history, their original 1650 letter of arms (Swedish: sköldebrev), was deposited at the Swedish House of Nobility in 1918, where it is preserved today.

Several branches of the family remain extant. The Swedish noble branch (Påhlman) continues to the present day, with members residing in Sweden, the United States, and Australia. Other descendants of the Westphalian and German lines (Pohlmann) are also found in various regions. In contrast, the Estonian branch (von Pohlmann) became extinct in the male line in 1898.

== See also ==
- Pohlmann
- Baltic German nobility
- Estonian Knighthood
- Swedish nobility
- List of Swedish noble families
- House of Nobility (Sweden)
- Russian nobility

== Sources ==
- Almquist, Johan Axel (1976). Frälsegodsen i Sverige under Storhetstiden: Med särskild hänsyn till proveniens och säteribildning. Vol. Del 4, Småland, Band 3: Säterier. Stockholm: LiberFörlag; Allmänna förlaget.
- Anrep, Gabriel (1858). Svenska adelns ättar-taflor. Vol. 3. Stockholm: P. A. Norstedt & Söner.
- "Pohlman, Reinhold Wilhelm v. (1727–1795)". BBLD – Baltisches Biografisches Lexikon digital. Baltische Historische Kommission.
- Dahl, Torsten; Bohman, Nils, eds. (1949). Svenska män och kvinnor: Biografisk uppslagsbok. Vol. 6. Stockholm: Albert Bonniers förlag.
- Elgenstierna, Gustaf (1930). Den introducerade svenska adelns ättartavlor. Vol. 6. Stockholm: P. A. Norstedt & Söners förlag.
- Grot, Iakov, ed. (1878). Sbornik imperatorskago russkago istoricheskago obshchestva. Vol. 23. St. Petersburg: Tipografiia Imperatorskoi Akademii Nauk. pp. 136 v.
- Hallenberg, Jonas (1793). Svea rikes historia under Konung Gustaf Adolf den Stores regering. Vol. 3. Stockholm: J. A. Carlbohm.
- Hefner, Otto Titan (1865). Stammbuch des blühenden und abgestorbenen Adels in Deutschland. Vol. 3. München: G. J. Manz.
- Heuser, Rita. "Pohlmann". Digitales Familiennamenwörterbuch Deutschlands (DFD). Akademie der Wissenschaften und der Literatur, Mainz.
- Horst, Karl Adolf von der (1894). Die Rittersitze der Grafschaft Ravensberg und des Fürstentums Minden. Berlin: Stargardt.
- Jahrbuch für Genealogie, Heraldik und Sphragistik. Mitau: J. F. Steffenhagen und Sohn. 1897.
- Kneschke, Ernst Heinrich (1867). Neues allgemeines deutsches Adels-Lexicon: Ossa – Ryssel. Vol. 7. Leipzig: Friedrich Voigt’s Buchhandlung.
- Kronobergs regementes historiekommitté (1967). Kungl. Kronobergs regemente under fyra sekel: 1623–1964. Växjö: Kungl. Kronobergs Regementes Historiekommitté.
- Kühle, Riëtha (2021). Princess Auguste: On a tightrope between love and abuse. London: Amazon Kindle Direct Publishing.
- Kurländische Gesellschaft für Literatur und Kunst (1903). Katalog der heraldischen Ausstellung zu Mitau. Mitau: J. F. Steffenhagen und Sohn.
- Kuropatnicki, Ewaryst Andrzej (1789). Wiadomość o klejnocie szlacheckim. Warszawa: Michał Gröll.
- Ledebur, Leopold von (1855). Adelslexicon der Preußischen Monarchie. Vol. 2. Berlin: Ludwig Rauh.
- "Påhlman". Minerva. Riddarhuset.
- Müller, Max (1931). Beitrag zur baltischen Wappenkunde. Riga: E. Plates.
- Österreichisches Staatsarchiv. "AT-OeStA/HHStA RK Taxamt 24-86 Pohlmann (Pollmann), von...".
- Pohlmann, M. (September–October 1957). "Vorkommen und Herkunft des Familiennamens Pohlmann". Norddeutsche Familienkunde (5): 254–256.
- Starykoń-Kasprzycki, Stefan Janusz, ed. (1938). Polska encyklopedia szlachecka. Vol. 9. Warszawa: Wydawnictwo Instytutu Kultury Historycznej.
- Polmanarkivet (2023). "Polman Family History".
- Rosell, Johan; Bäckmark, Magnus; Ellehag, Claes G.; Janzon, Kaj; Hildebrand, Gabriel (2019). Riddarhusets vapensköldar. Vol. 1. Stockholm: Riddarhusdirektionen.
- "Påhlman, släkt". Svenskt biografiskt lexikon. Riksarkivet. 1995.
- Segerstråle, Nils (1979). Svenska fideikommiss. Stockholm: Almqvist & Wiksell.
- Siebmacher, Johann (1898). Grosses und allgemeines Wappenbuch: Der Adel der russischen Ostseeprovinzen. Abteilung 11. Vol. 3. Nürnberg: Bauer & Raspe.
- Sjöström, Oskar (2009). Fraustadt 1706: Ett fält färgat rött. Lund: Historiska Media.
- Stackelberg, Otto Magnus von (1930). Genealogisches Handbuch der estländischen Ritterschaft. Vol. 2. Görlitz: Verlag für Sippenforschung und Wappenkunde C. A. Starke.
- Svedenfors, Folke (1954). "Herrgårdar i mellersta och norra Sunnerbo". Gränsbygden 2: Mellersta och norra Sunnerbo i gången tid. Lund: C. W. K. Gleerup. pp. 524–546.
- Wrangel, Fredrik Ulrik; Bergström, Otto (1897). Svenska adelns ättartaflor ifrån år 1857. Vol. 2. Stockholm: P. A. Norstedt & Söners förlag.
- Źernicki-Szeliga, Emilian von (1904). Die polnischen Stammwappen. Hamburg: Henri Grand.
- Ulväng, Göran. "Svenska Herrgårdar". Svenska Herrgårdar.
- Vejde, Pehr Gunnar (1928). Kronobergs läns herrgårdar: historisk översikt jämte ägarlängder. Växjö: Längmanska kulturfonden.
- "Kinnistute register". Rahvusarhiiv (The National Archives of Estonia) (in Estonian).
- Luthander, Lennart; Tham, Louise; von Schoultz, Gösta (1968). Slott och herresäten i Sverige: Västergötland Dalsland Värmland. Malmö: Allhems Förlag.
- Åkerhielm, Erik (1904). Smålandska Fideikommiss. Stockholm: P. A. Norstedt & Söner.
- Rosengren, Josef (1920). Linnell, Ludvig; Fischer, J. (eds.). Ny Smålands Beskrifning [Allbo Och Sunnerbo Härader]. Vol. 3. Växjö: Nya Vexiöbladet.
- "Bidrag till Sveriges officiela statistik". Statistisk Tidskrift. N.F. 21. Statistiska centralbyrån. 1872.
- "Öötla". [KNR] Dictionary of Estonian Place names. Dictionary of Estonian Place Names. Institute of the Estonian Language.
- "Öötla Manor". Estonian Manors Portal. n.d.
- Dullweber, Stefanie (8 September 2022). "Ritterlich Wohnen: Familie holt altes Hofgut aus dem Dornröschenschlaf" [Knightly Living: Family Brings Old Farm out of Slumber]. Mindener Tageblatt.
- Koit, Jakob (January 1966). "Estnische Bauern als Krieger während der Kämpfe in Livland 1558–1611". Eesti Teadusliku Seltsi Rootsis aastaraamat = Annales Societatis Litterarum Estonicae in Svecia (4): 39–40.
- Hagemeister, Heinrich von (1837). Materialien zu einer Geschichte der Landgüter Livlands. Der Dörptsche Kreis. Vol. 2. Riga: Frantz.
- "Sköldebrev för Johan och Gustav Pohlman". SVAR – Riksarkivet (Sköldebrev) (in Swedish). Riksarkivet. 1650. Riksregistraturet, SE/RA/1112.1/B/268 (1650), Bildid: A0038763_00170.
- "Otto Fredric Påhlman". Linköpingsbladet. 11 May 1822.
- Wachtmeister, Hans; Wachtmeister, Hugo (1915). Anteckningar och bref från Carl Johanstiden ur landshöfdingen grefve Hans Wachtmeister den äldres papper. Stockholm: Norstedt. p. 174. hdl:2027/umn.31951001260392c.
- Pabst, Eduard (1861). Est- und Livländische Brieflade: eine Sammlung von Urkunden zur Adels- und Gütergeschichte Est- und Livlands in Uebersetzungen und Auszügen. Abt. 2 Schwedische und Polnische Zeit Bd. 1 Die Jahre 1561 bis 1650. Reval: Kluge u. Ströhm. p. 810.
- Treiberg, P. (1929). "Eestimaa talunikkude palve- ja kaebekiri kuningas Karl Xl-le 1684. a." [Petition and Letter of Complaint of the Estonian Peasants to King Charles XI in 1684]. Ajalooline Ajakiri (in Estonian). 3: 162–164.
- Polman, Georg [Jürgen] (n.d.). "Letter to Axel Oxenstierna af Södermöre". Riksarkivet (Swedish National Archives). "Archival reference: Oxenstiernska samlingen, SE/RA/720701/II/01."
- Polman, Jürgen (10 August 1603). "Letter to Anders Lennartsson". Riksarkivet (Swedish National Archives). "Archival reference: Krigshistoriska Samlingen, SE/RA/754/2/VI/2."
- Strömberg, Valentin H. (2007). "Fördomar Och Ekonomisk Krishantering 1815 Års Riksdag Och Frågan Om Judars Rättsställning I Sverige" [Prejudice and Economic Crisis Management: The 1815 Riksdag and the Question of the Legal Status of Jews in Sweden]. In Diestelkamp, Bernhard; Vogel, Hans-Heinrich; Jörn, Nils; Nilsén, Per; Häthén, Christian (eds.). Liber Amicorum Kjell Å Modéer. Lund: Juristförlaget i Lund. pp. 503–517.
- Heß, Cordelia (2022). The Medieval Archive of Antisemitism in Nineteenth-Century Sweden. Berlin/Boston: Walter de Gruyter GmbH.
- Alm, Mikael (2008). "The Cautious Crusader: The Swedish King as a Peace-Promoting Monarch". In Alm, Mikael; Johansson, Britt-Inger (eds.). Scripts of Kingship: Essays on Bernadotte and Dynastic Formation in an Age of Revolution. Uppsala: Reklam & Katalogtryck AB.
- Bartlett, Roger P. (1984). "J. J. Sievers and the Russian Peasantry Under Catherine II". Jahrbücher für Geschichte Osteuropas. Neue Folge. 32 (1): 16–33.
- Golovine, Varvara Nikolaevna (1910). Memoirs of Countess Golovine: A Lady at the Court of Catherine II. Translated by Fox-Davies, G. M. London: David Nutt.
- Wandestam, Pernilla (2007). Ryssby kyrkogård. Smålands museum rapport (in Swedish). Vol. 2007:119. Växjö: Smålands museum. ISSN 1403-2902.
- Palmblad, Samuel (n.d.). Karakterisering och kulturhistorisk värdering: Ryssby kyrka (in Swedish). Smålands museum.
