= Peggy Hård =

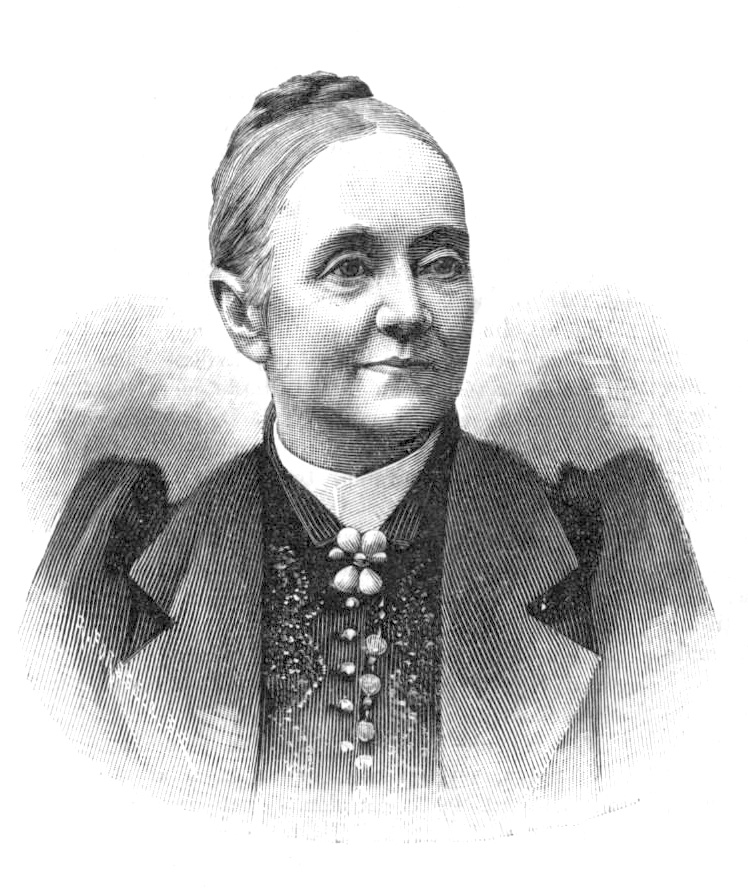
Peggy Hård. Xylography 1893.

Margaretha Maria "Peggy" Hård (1825–1894) was a Swedish office clerk, counted as the first woman of her profession in Sweden.

Peggy Hård was the daughter of the government minister count Carl Gustaf Hård and Anna Maria af Sandeberg. She and her sisters became poor after the death of their father in 1841, and supported themselves with sewing work. Hård remained unmarried. After the foundation of the bank Länssparbanken Stockholm in Stockholm in 1862, she was offered a position at the bank office, which she accepted. After a few years as an accountant, she was promoted to treasurer. She belonged to the first pioneers of her gender to have these professions. While there were no legal gender restrictions of the office professions, it was very controversial for a woman to be an office clerk, especially if she was a member of the nobility, as Hård was, though from a poor family. She was described as a dutiful and reliable employee and was active until her retirement for health reasons, when she was given a pension. In 1893, when the profession of office clerk had become common for women in Sweden, she was celebrated by the women's paper Idun as a pioneer who opened the profession of clerk for others of her gender.
