= Påhlmans Handelsinstitut =

Business school in Stockholm, Sweden

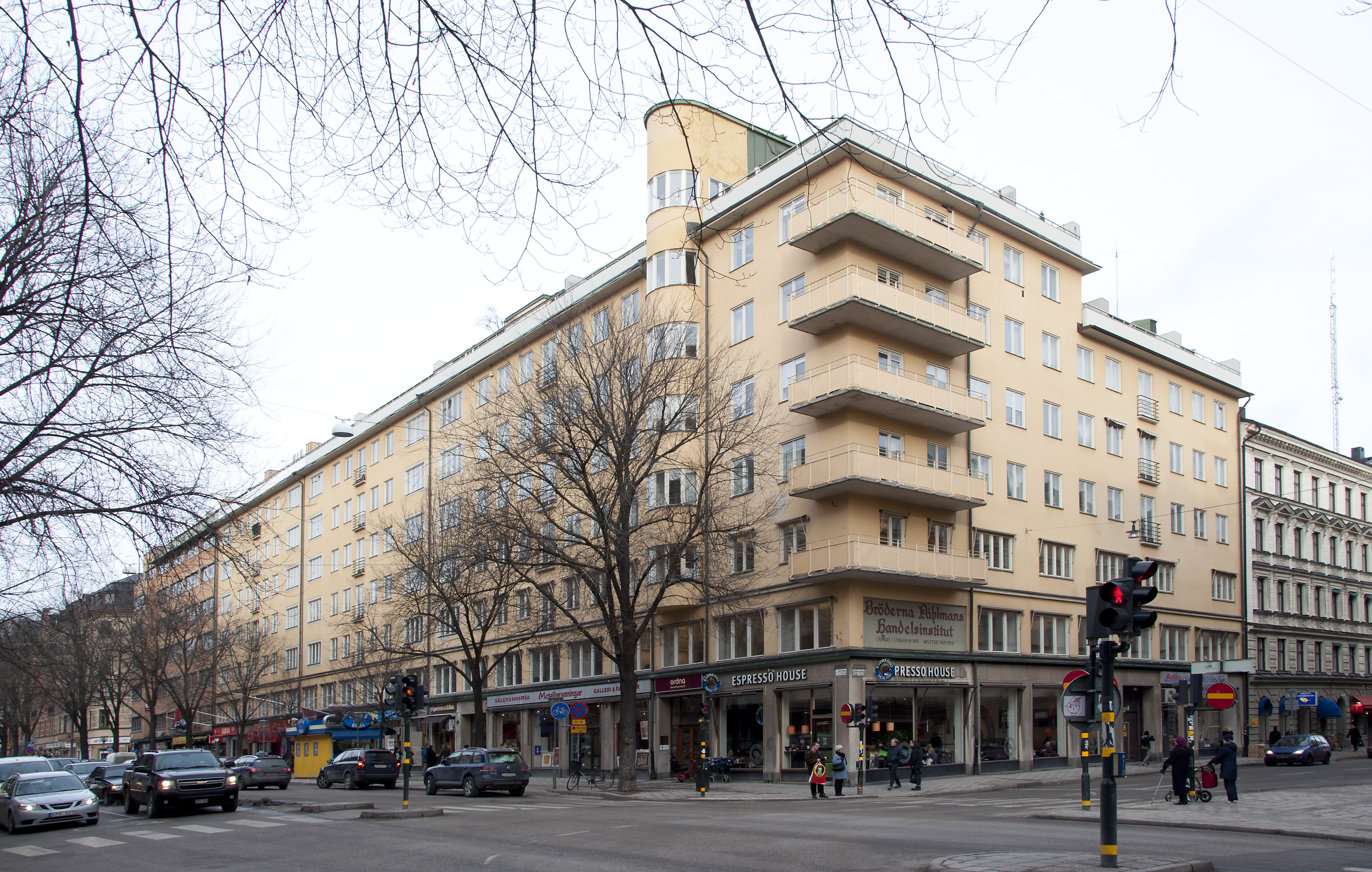
- Pålmans handelsinstitut at Sveavägen in Stockholm
- Type: business college
- Established: 1881
- Dean: Theréz Randquist
- Location: Stockholm, Sweden
- Campus: Urban
- Website: www.phi.se

Påhlmans Handelsinstitut, previously known as Broderna Påhlmans, is a business college in Stockholm.

== History ==
The school had its origins in a writing institute established by Otto Magnus Påhlman (1811-1873) in Stockholm in 1846. The activities of the institute expanded gradually as it went from teaching students not only how to write, but what to write, until in 1881 the sons of Otto Magnus Påhlman, Otto Ottoson Påhlman (1853-1915) and John Magnus Ottoson Påhlman (1860-1945), decided to convert the writing institute into a business school, which was known as Broderna Påhlmans (Påhlman Brothers). In 1887 Otto Ottoson Påhlman left to set up a similar school in Copenhagen which eventually became completely independent of the parent school in Stockholm, and John Påhlman took over management of the Stockholm school. By 1891 John Påhlman was the sole owner of the Stockholm school, and during that decade expanded the courses taught to include customs issues, postal, railway and shipping issues. In 1899 a training office was added to the school, followed in 1907 by courses in banking.

In 1919 the school became official recognised and eligible for state aid. It was the first business school in Sweden to receive this kind of recognition. A new building, designed by the prominent builder Olle Engkvist based on drawings by Mauritz Dahlberg, was built on Sveavägen at nos. 82-88, and the school was relocated there in 1930.

Following the retirement of John Påhlman in 1933, John Påhlman's son, Jolin Magnus Gösta Påhlman (1895-1963) who went by the name Gösta M. Påhlman, took over running of the school. Presently the school is owned and run by the non-profit Studieförbundet Medborgarskolan.
