= Ülenurme Parish =

Former municipality of Estonia

Coordinates: 58°18′57″N 26°43′27″E

Ülenurme Parish Ülenurme vald
- Former municipality of Estonia
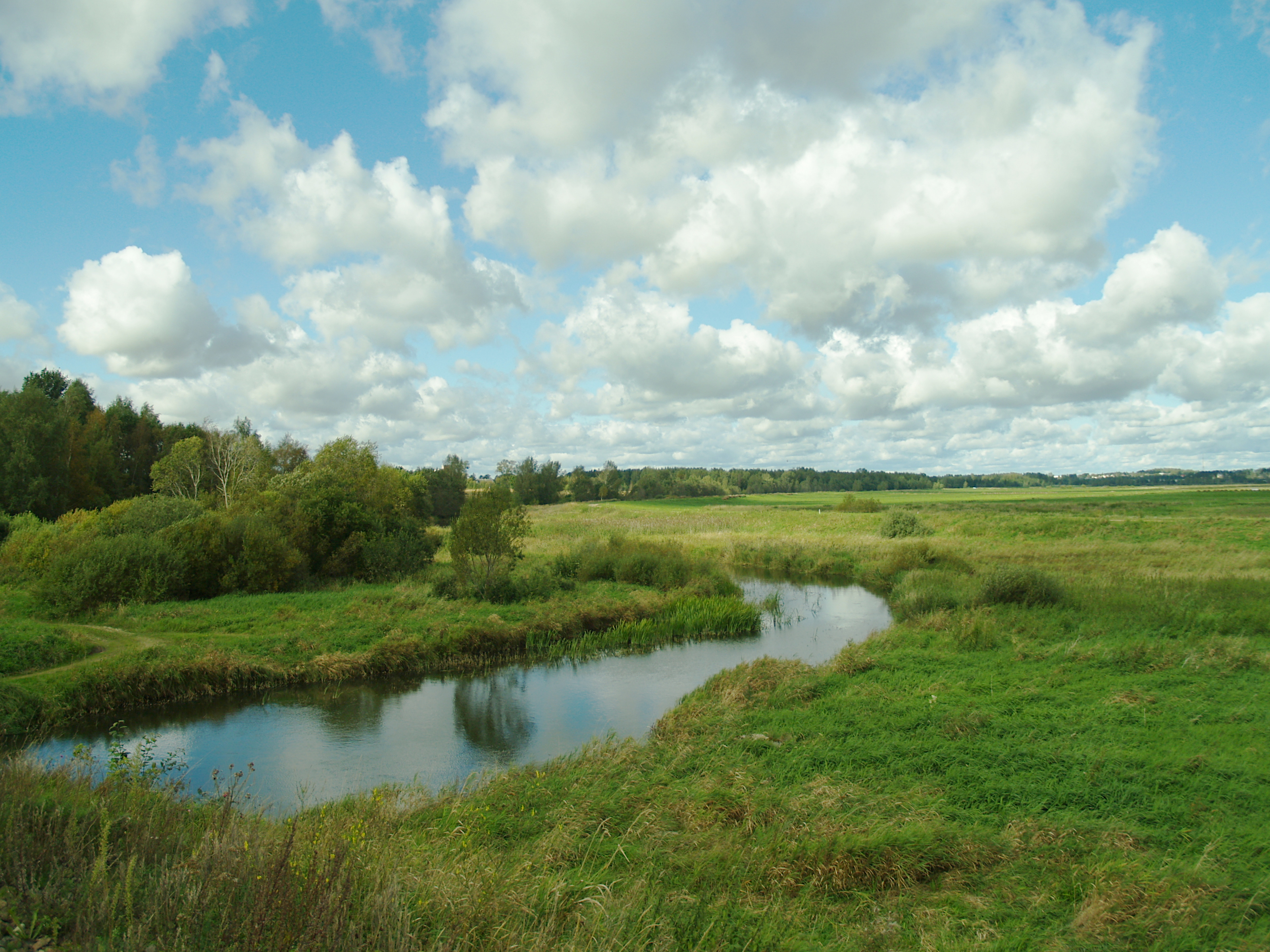
- Porijõgi river

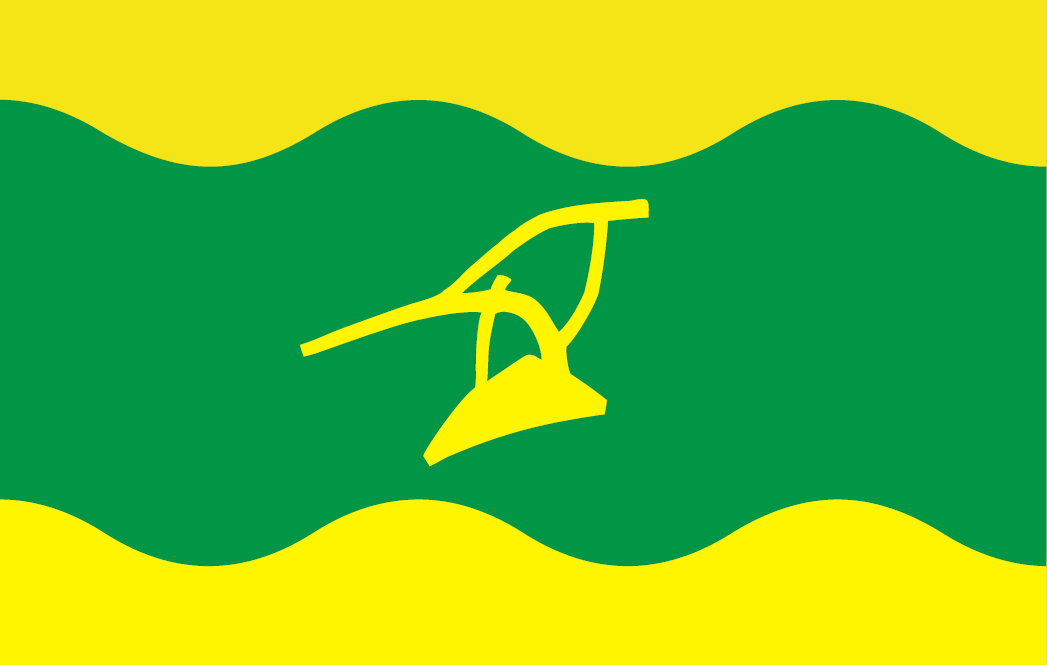
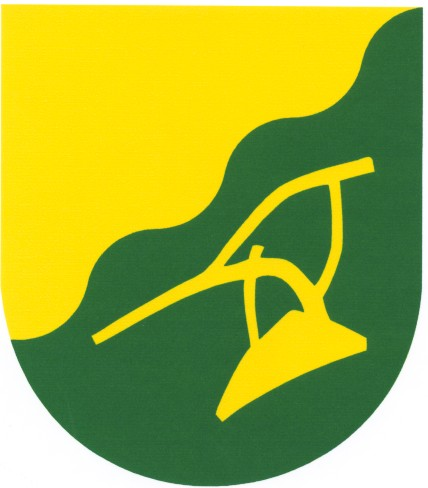
- Flag Coat of arms

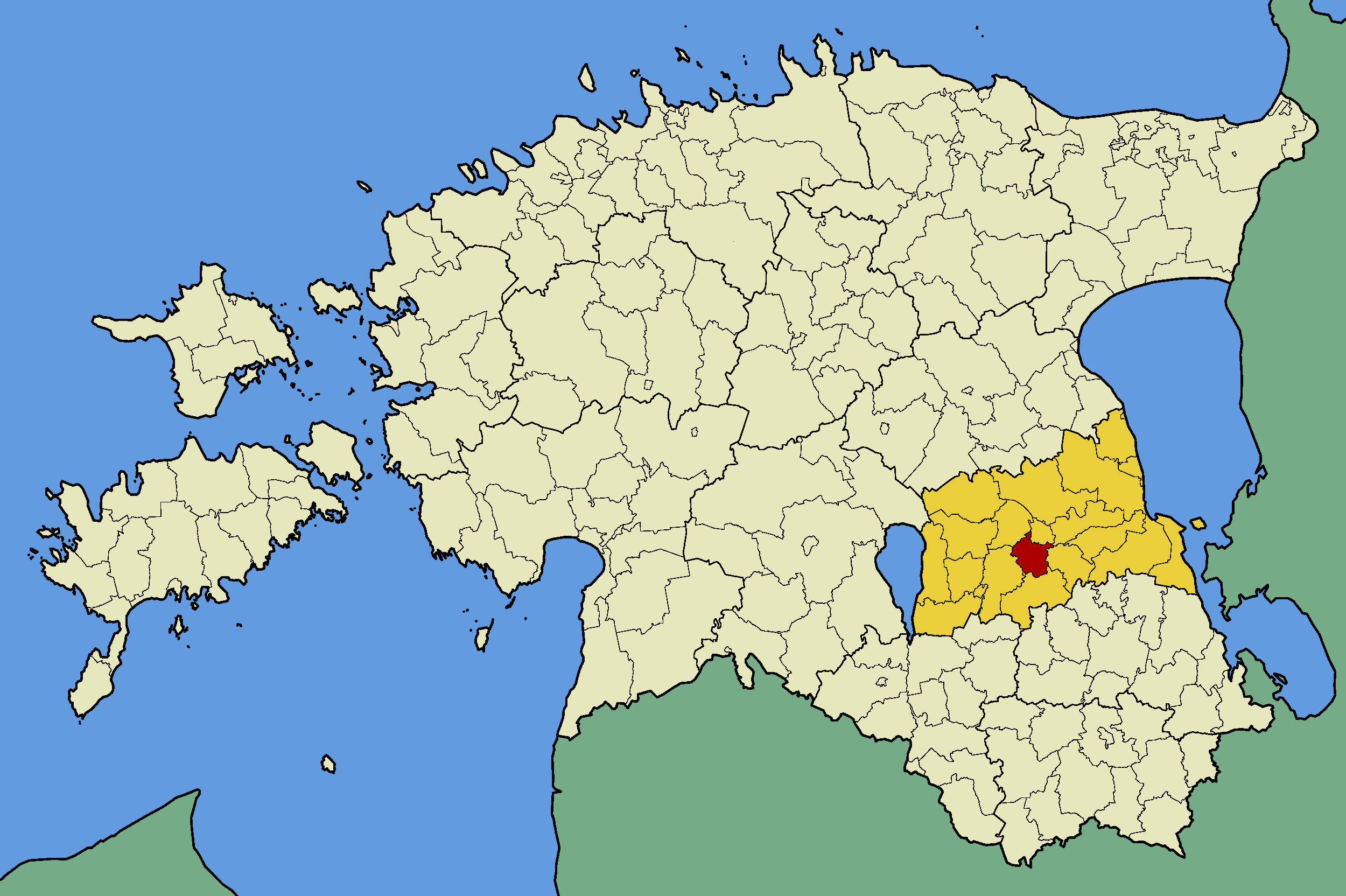
- Ülenurme Parish within Tartu County.
- Country: Estonia
- County: Tartu County
- Administrative centre: Ülenurme

Government
  - Mayor: Aivar Aleksejev

Area
  - Total: 86.35 km^{2} (33.34 sq mi)

Population (01.01.2009)
  - Total: 4,773
  - Density: 55.28/km^{2} (143.2/sq mi)
- Website: www.ylenurme.ee

Ülenurme Parish (Estonian: Ülenurme vald) was a rural municipality in Tartu County, Estonia, directly south of Tartu.

In 2017, the Government of Estonia decided to merge Ülenurme Parish into Kambja Parish by the administrative reform. Ülenurme Parish Council did not wish to voluntarily join, challenging compulsory affiliation to the Supreme Court, but lost their case.

There were four boroughs in the rural municipality: Külitse, Räni, Tõrvandi, and Ülenurme. They account for 7/10 of the rural municipality's inhabitants.

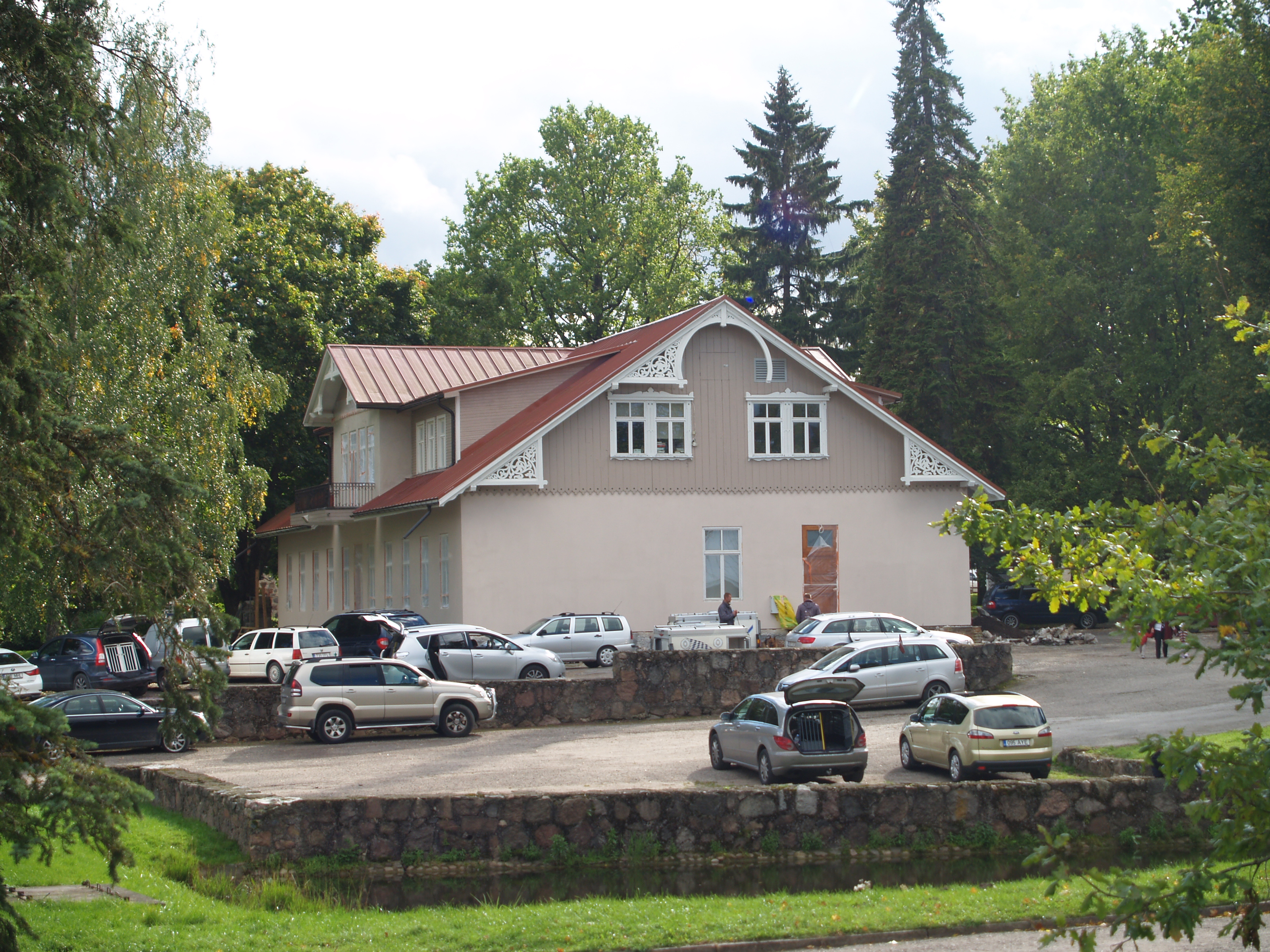
Ülenurme manor.

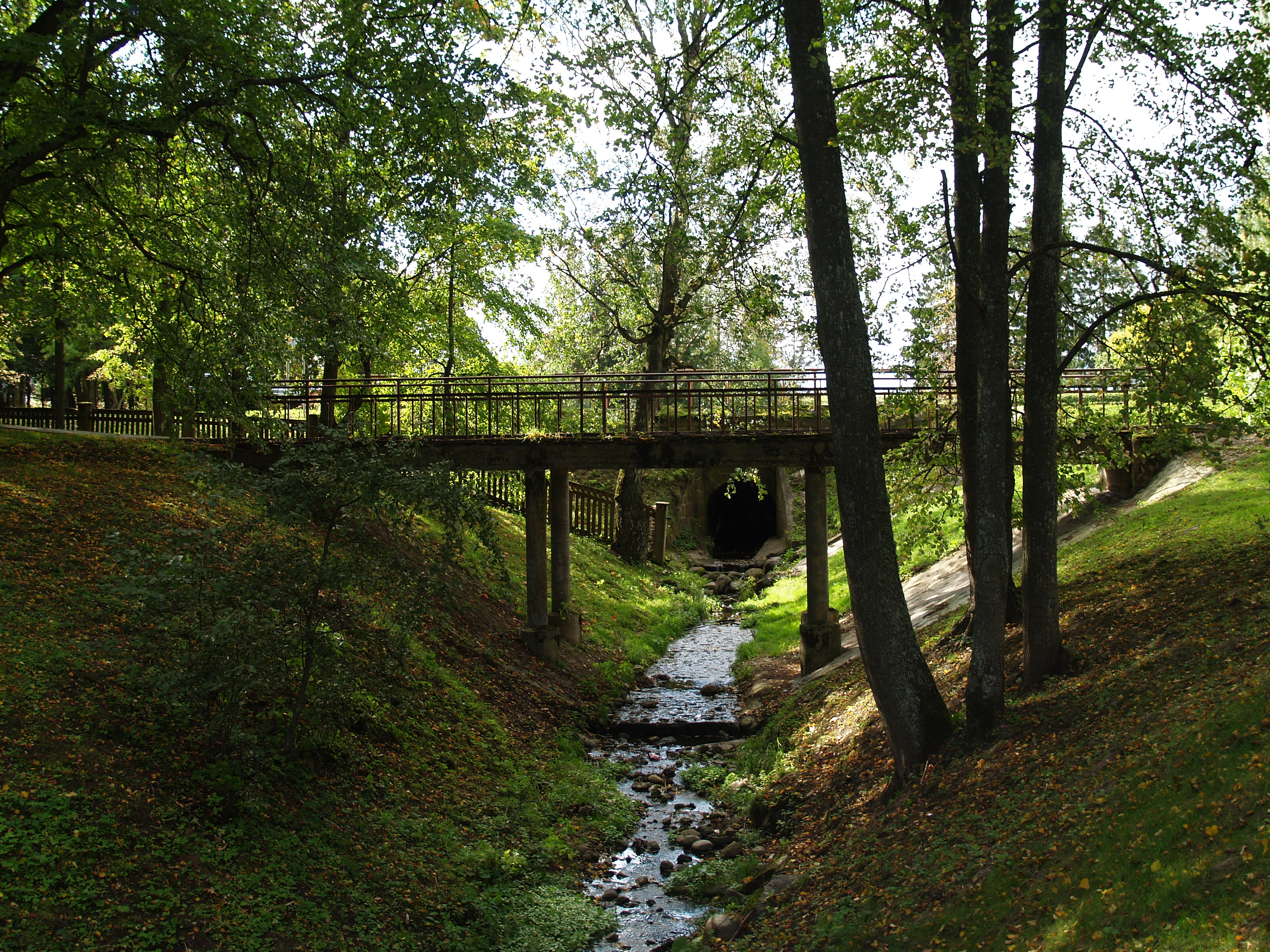
Ülenurme park.

Ülenurme got its name from the Ülenurme manor built at the beginning of the 17th century.

Due to the proximity to the city of Tartu, a large-scale real estate development took place in Ülenurme during the economic boom, resulting in the new housing estates of Männi, Aasa and Mõis. Due to this, the number of residents of the village and Räni has risen rapidly, and they were therefore named boroughs in 2013.

The area contains Tartu Airport, where the Estonian Aviation Academy operates.

The Tallinn-Tartu-Võru-Luhamaa road, Jõhvi-Tartu-Valga road, Tartu-Valga railway line, and Tartu-Koidula railway line pass through the area.

The Ilmatsalu River and Porijõgi flow through the valley located in Ülenurme Parish.

The last governor of Ülenurme Parish was Aivar Aleksejev.

It had a population of 4,773 (as of 1 January 2009) and covered an area of 86.35 km². The population density is 55.275/km^{2} (143.162/sq mi).

== Settlements ==
Small boroughs

Külitse - Räni - Tõrvandi - Ülenurme

Villages

Laane - Läti - Lemmatsi - Lepiku - Õssu - Reola - Soinaste - Soosilla - Täsvere - Uhti
