= Tartu Airport =

Airport near Tartu, Estonia

Tartu Airport Tartu lennujaam
- IATA: TAY; ICAO: EETU

Summary
- Airport type: Public
- Operator: Tallinn Airport Ltd
- Serves: Tartu, Estonia
- Location: Reola, Ülenurme Parish
- Opened: 15 May 1946; 80 years ago
- Elevation AMSL: 219 ft (67 m)
- Coordinates: 58°18′27″N 026°41′13″E
- Website: www.tartu-airport.ee

Map
- Location in Estonia

Runways
Direction	Length		Surface
Direction	m	ft	Surface
08/26	1,799	5,902	Asphalt/concrete

Statistics (2025)
- Number of passengers: 44,489
- Cargo (tonnes): 0,0
- Sources: Estonian AIP

Tartu Airport (Estonian: Tartu lennujaam) (IATA: TAY, ICAO: EETU) is an airport in Reola, Ülenurme Parish, 5.9 nautical miles (10.9 km; 6.8 mi) south southwest of Tartu, the second largest city in Estonia. It is also called Ülenurme Airport due to its proximity to the village of Ülenurme. The Tallinn–Tartu–Võru–Luhamaa highway (E263) passes near the airport.

== History ==
The airport was opened on 15 May 1946. In 1981, a new terminal building was built, and the runway and taxiway were upgraded. Since 2005, the airport has been operated by Tallinn Airport. In 2009, the runway was lengthened to 1,799 m (5,902 ft).

Besides commercial passenger flights, a large part of flight operations at Tartu Airport consist of training flights by the Estonian Aviation Academy, which is situated right beside the airport. Medical flights from Tartu University Clinic also operate from the airport.

== Airlines and destinations ==
After Finnair ended flights from Tartu in October 2022 there were no regular commercial passenger flights to Tartu. In 2024, Finnair won the procurement for subsidized flights and the Helsinki line was reopened in March. In April 2024, the flights were suspended for a month due to Russian GPS jamming. The airport requires GNSS for initial approach on landings. In the first year after the resumption of flights to Helsinki, Tartu Airport served 37,369 passengers.

Airlines	Destinations
Finnair	Helsinki

== Ground transportation ==
=== Bus ===
Connection to Tartu city center and towns and villages in the surrounding areas is provided by a number of regional bus lines:

241: Tartu - Airport - Hobunurme - Haage - Tartu

306: Tartu - Kambja park - Kaatsi - Suure-Kambja - (Koidu)

323: Tartu - Airport - Aarike - Kambja - Pangodi - Otepää

328: Tartu - Tõrvandi - Airport - Külitse järve - Haage - Tartu

331: Tartu - Airport - Aarike - Lutike - Otepää - Kambja - Tartu

332: Airport - Tõrvandi - Tartu

339: Tartu - Tõrvandi - Airport - Kambja park - (Kuuste)

354: Tartu - Airport- Aarike - Luke manor - Nõo - Luke - Elva

=== Highway ===
The Tallinn–Tartu–Võru–Luhamaa highway (E263) passes near the airport. The airport offers taxi service through its official partner Forus Taxi as well as 60 parking spaces.

== See also ==
- Estonian Aviation Academy
- Estonian Aviation Museum
- Raadi Airfield (Tartu Air Base)
