= Kõrkküla =

Kõrkküla may refer to several places in Estonia:

- Kõrkküla, Jõgeva County, village in Põltsamaa Parish, Jõgeva County
- Kõrkküla, Lääne-Viru County, village in Viru-Nigula Parish, Lääne-Viru County
- Kõrkküla, Saare County, village in Saaremaa Parish, Saare County
- Kõrkküla, Tartu County, village in Kambja Parish, Tartu County
