= Lake Pangodi =

Lake in Estonia

- Pangodi järv (Estonian)
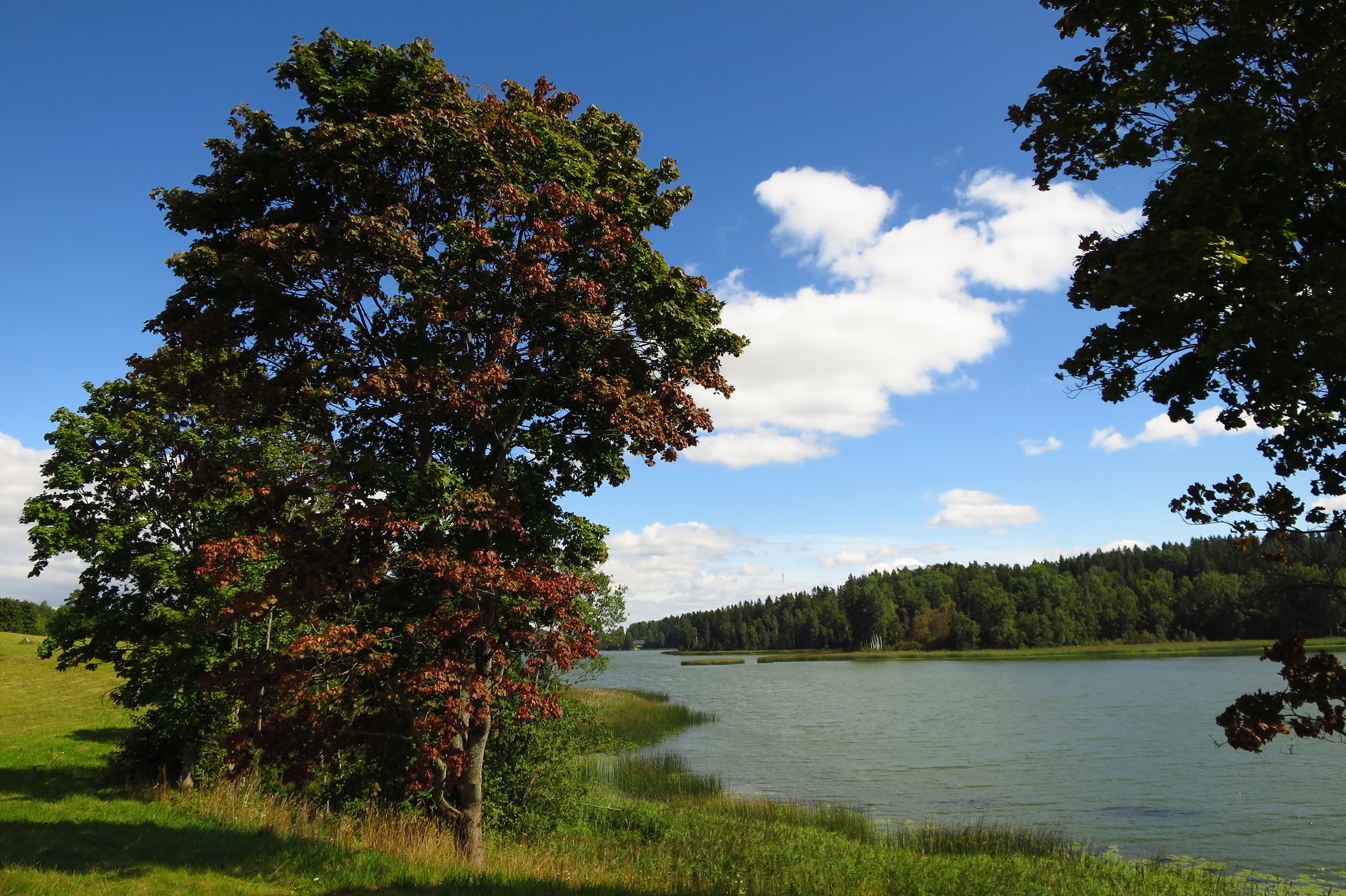

- Location within Estonia
- Location: Kambja Parish, Tartu County, Estonia
- Coordinates: 58.196°N 26.57°E
- Basin countries: Estonia
- Max. length: 2,100 meters (6,900 ft)
- Surface area: 93.3 hectares (231 acres)
- Average depth: 4.0 meters (13.1 ft)
- Max. depth: 10.0 meters (32.8 ft)
- Water volume: 3,697,000 cubic meters (130,600,000 cu ft)
- Shore length^{1}: 8,090 meters (26,540 ft)
- Surface elevation: 105.5 meters (346 ft)
- Islands: 2
- ^{1} Shore length is not a well-defined measure.

Lake Pangodi (Estonian: Pangodi järv or Pangoti järv) is a lake in Estonia. It is located in the village of Pangodi in Kambja Parish, Tartu County

== Physical description ==
The lake has an area of 93.3 hectares (231 acres), and it has two islands with a combined area of 0.4 hectares (0.99 acres). The lake has an average depth of 4.0 meters (13.1 ft) and a maximum depth of 10.0 meters (32.8 ft). It is 2,100 meters (6,900 ft) long, and its shoreline measures 8,090 meters (26,540 ft). It has a volume of 3,697,000 cubic meters (130,600,000 cu ft).

== See also ==
- List of lakes of Estonia
