= Kambja Parish =

Municipality of Estonia (2017)

Coordinates: 58°14′N 26°42′E

Kambja Parish Kambja vald
- Municipality of Estonia
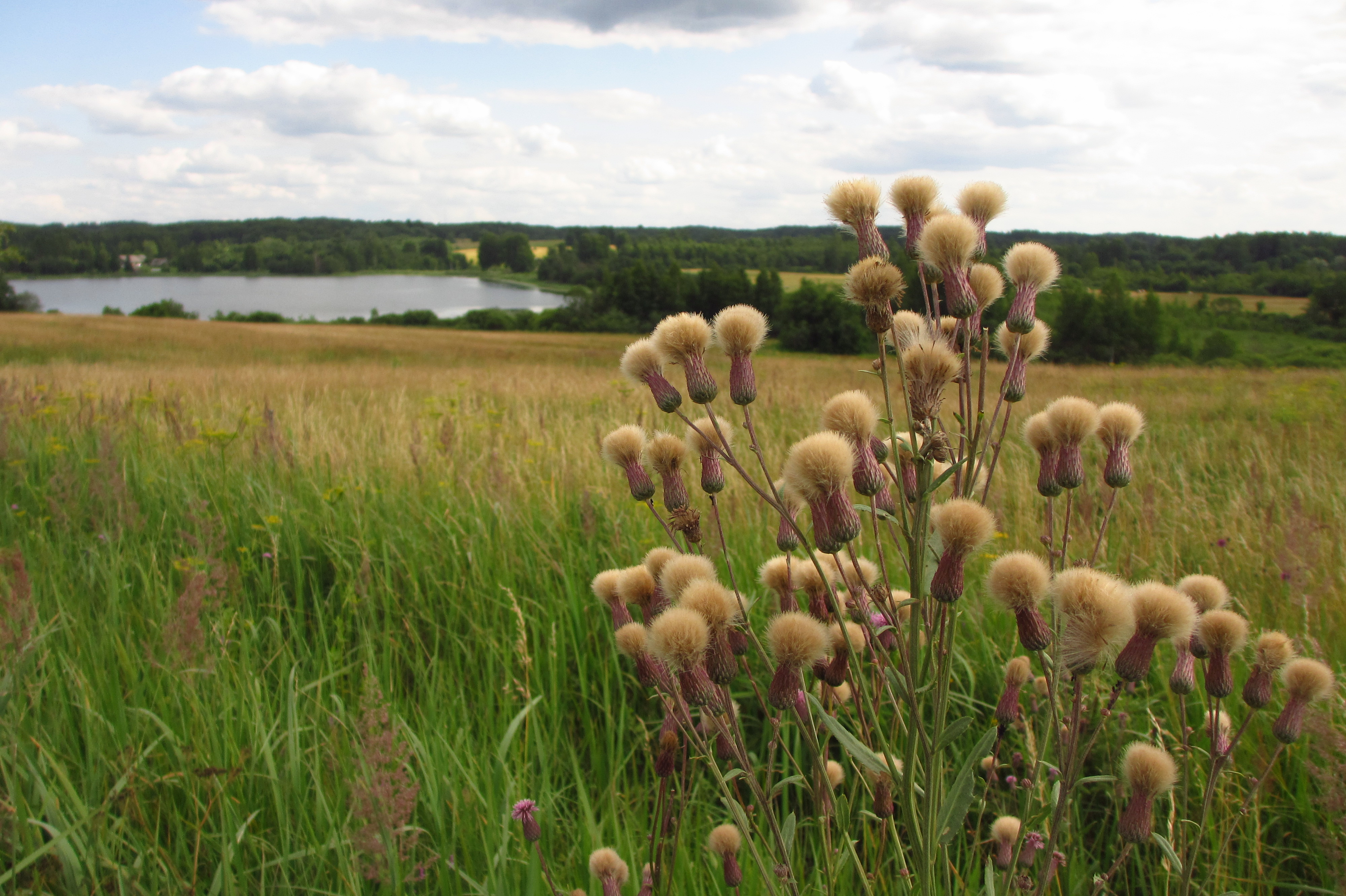

- Flag Coat of arms

- Kambja Parish within Tartu County
- Country: Estonia
- County: Tartu County
- Administrative centre: Ülenurme

Area
  - Total: 275 km^{2} (106 sq mi)

Population (01.01.2020)
  - Total: 11,452
  - Density: 41.6/km^{2} (108/sq mi)
- ISO 3166 code: EE-283
- Website: www.kambja.ee

Kambja Parish is a rural municipality in Tartu County, Estonia.

== Settlements and demography ==
Small boroughs

Kambja - Külitse - Räni - Tõrvandi - Ülenurme

Villages

Aakaru - Ivaste - Kaatsi - Kammeri - Kavandu - Kodijärve - Kõrkküla - Kullaga - Laane - Lalli - Läti - Lemmatsi - Lepiku - Madise - Mäeküla - Oomiste - Õssu - Paali - Palumäe - Pangodi - Pulli - Pühi - Raanitsa - Rebase - Reola - Reolasoo - Riiviku - Sipe - Sirvaku - Soinaste - Soosilla - Sulu - Suure-Kambja - Talvikese - Tatra - Täsvere - Uhti - Vana-Kuuste - Virulase - Visnapuu

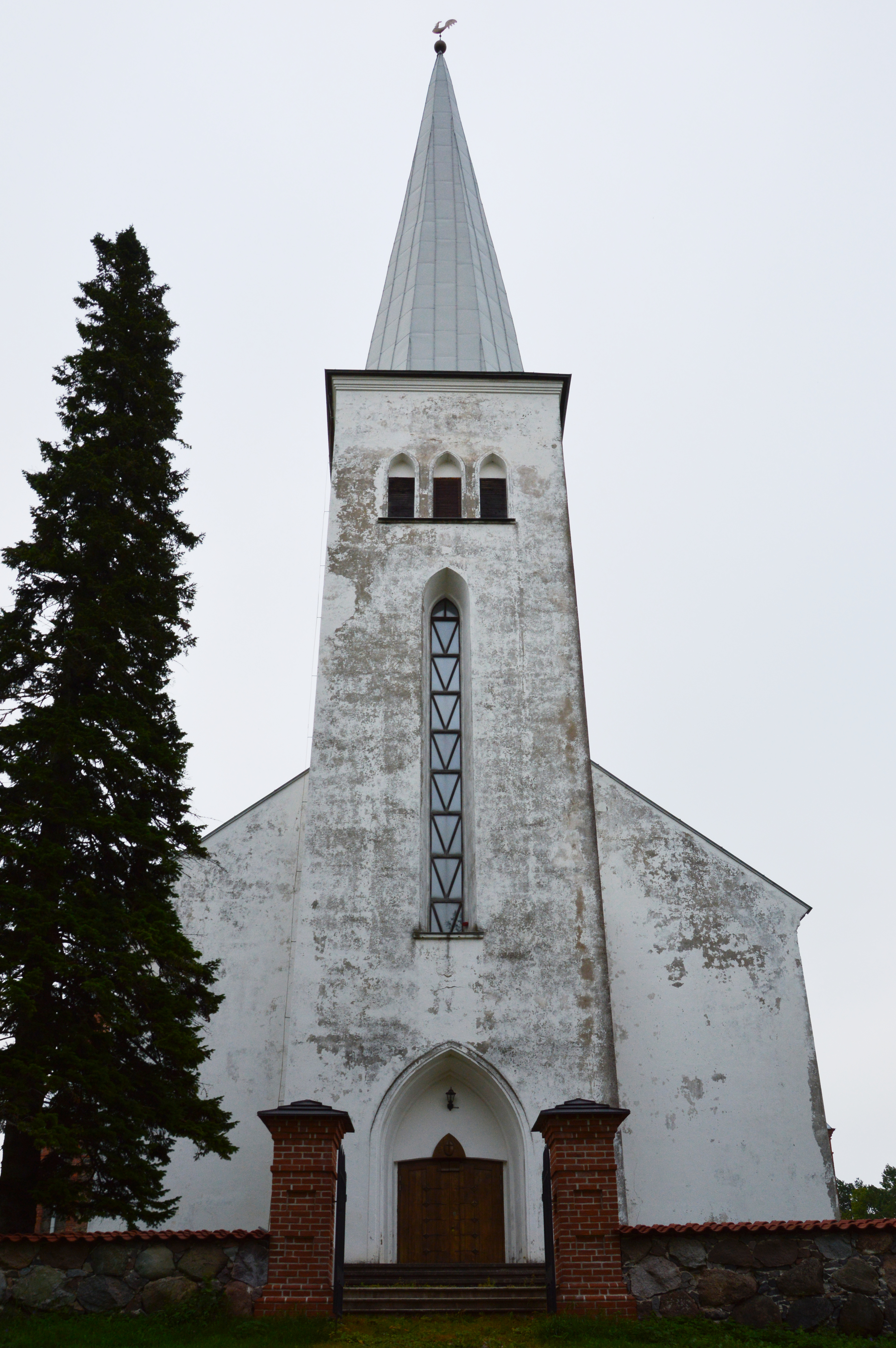
Kambja Church

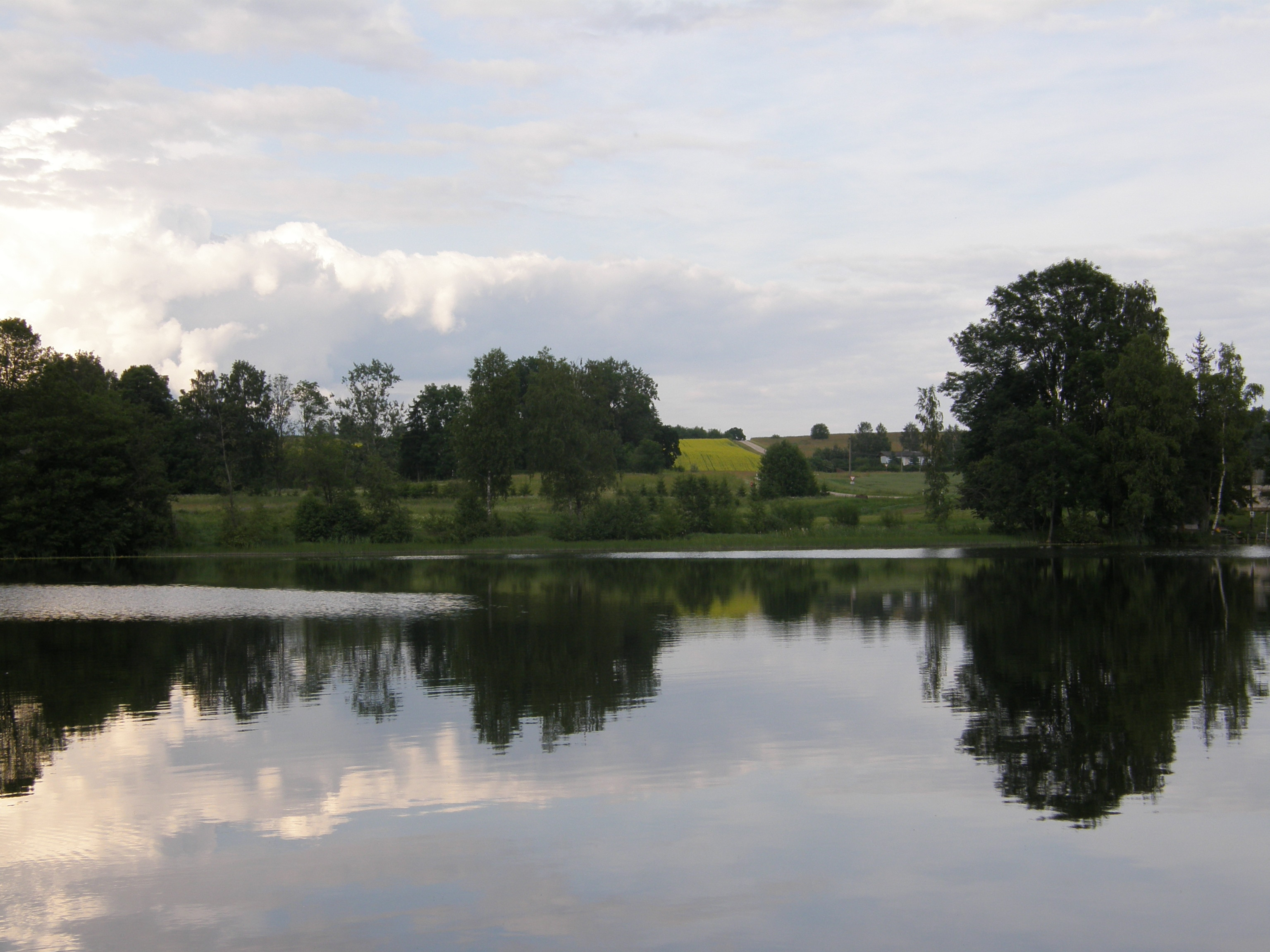
Pangodi Lake in Pangodi

The majority of the adult population of the municipality is without religious affiliation. The largest number of believers are Lutherans, to a lesser extent there are also Orthodox Christians and members of other religious communities.

== Twinnings ==
- Toivakka Municipality, Finland

== Notable people ==
- Gregor von Helmersen (1803 in Kammeri – 1885), a Baltic German geologist.
- Karl Eduard von Liphart (1808 – 1891), a noted art expert and collector; founding President of the Estonian Naturalists' Society
- Ernst Friedrich von Liphart (1847 – 1932), painter, a noted art expert, art collector and curator at the Hermitage Museum.
- Karl-Johannes Soonpää (1895 in Pangodi – 1944), politician, civil servant and a one of the Forest Brothers
- Karl-Robert Ruus (1899 in Pangodi - 1946), politician, the governor of Valga County, Harju County and Lääne County, 1930/1940.
- Albert Kusnets (1902 in Suure-Kambja – 1942), middleweight Greco-Roman wrestler; bronze medallist at the 1928 Summer Olympics
- Leonhard Kukk (1906 in Pangodi – 1941), a weightlifter, who competed in the men's middleweight at the 1928 Summer Olympics
- Johannes Kotkas (1915 in Kodijärve – 1998), a heavyweight Greco-Roman wrestler and gold medallist at the 1952 Summer Olympics.
- Rain Eensaar (born 1974 in Lemmatsi), an orienteer, rogainer and adventure racer.
- Ivo Posti (born 1975 in Vana-Kuuste), a countertenor, historian and director of Narva Museum.
