= Kodijärve =

Village in Estonia

- Village
- Location in Estonia
- Coordinates: 58°10′N 26°32′E
- Country: Estonia
- County: Tartu County
- Parish: Kambja Parish
- Time zone: UTC+2 (EET)
  - Summer (DST): UTC+3 (EEST)

Kodijärve (German: Gothensee) is a village in Kambja Parish, Tartu County in eastern Estonia.

Kodijärve is the birthplace of heavyweight Greco-Roman wrestler and Olympic gold medalist Johannes Kotkas (1915-1998).

== Gallery ==
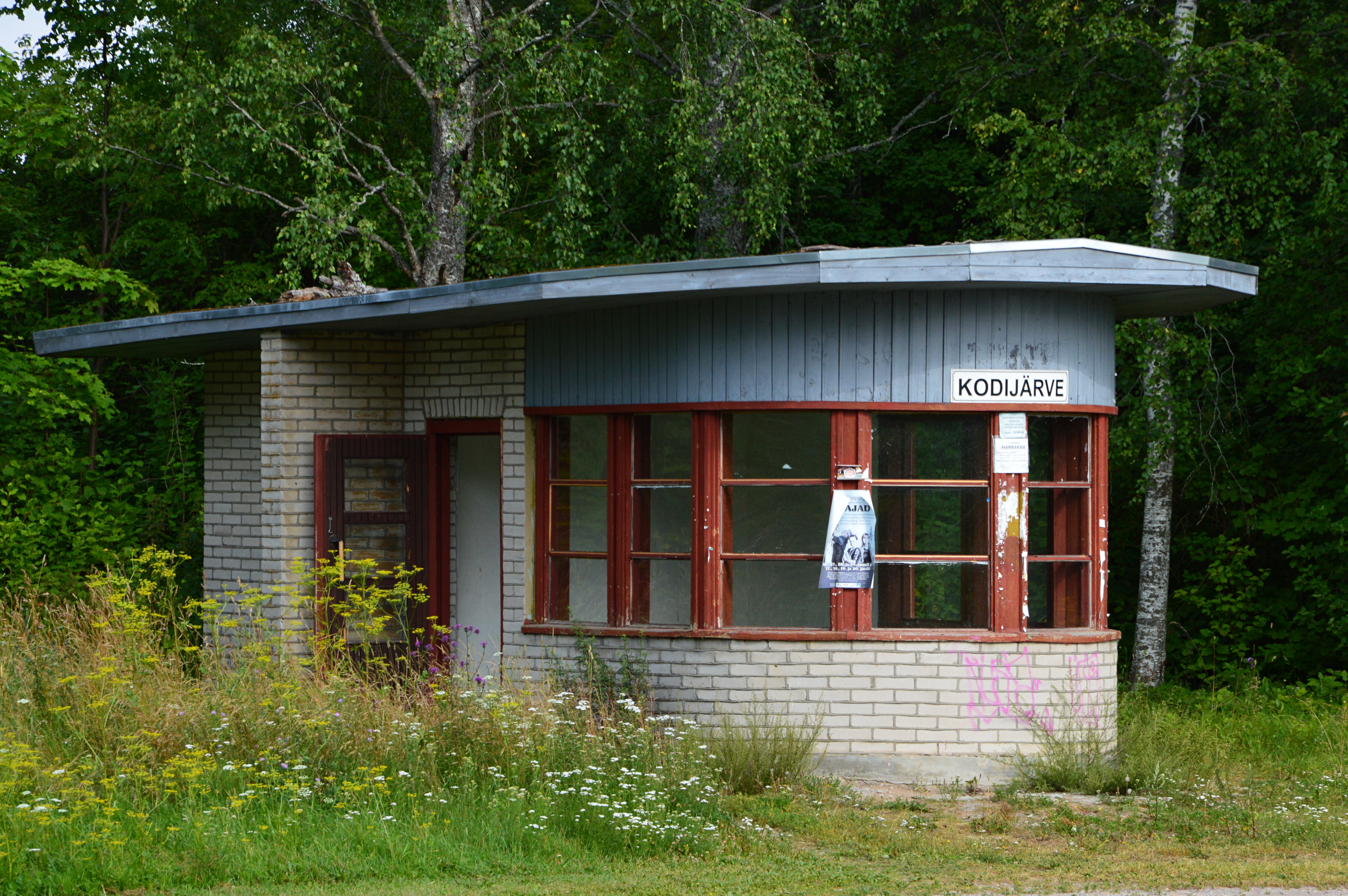
Kodijärve bus stop

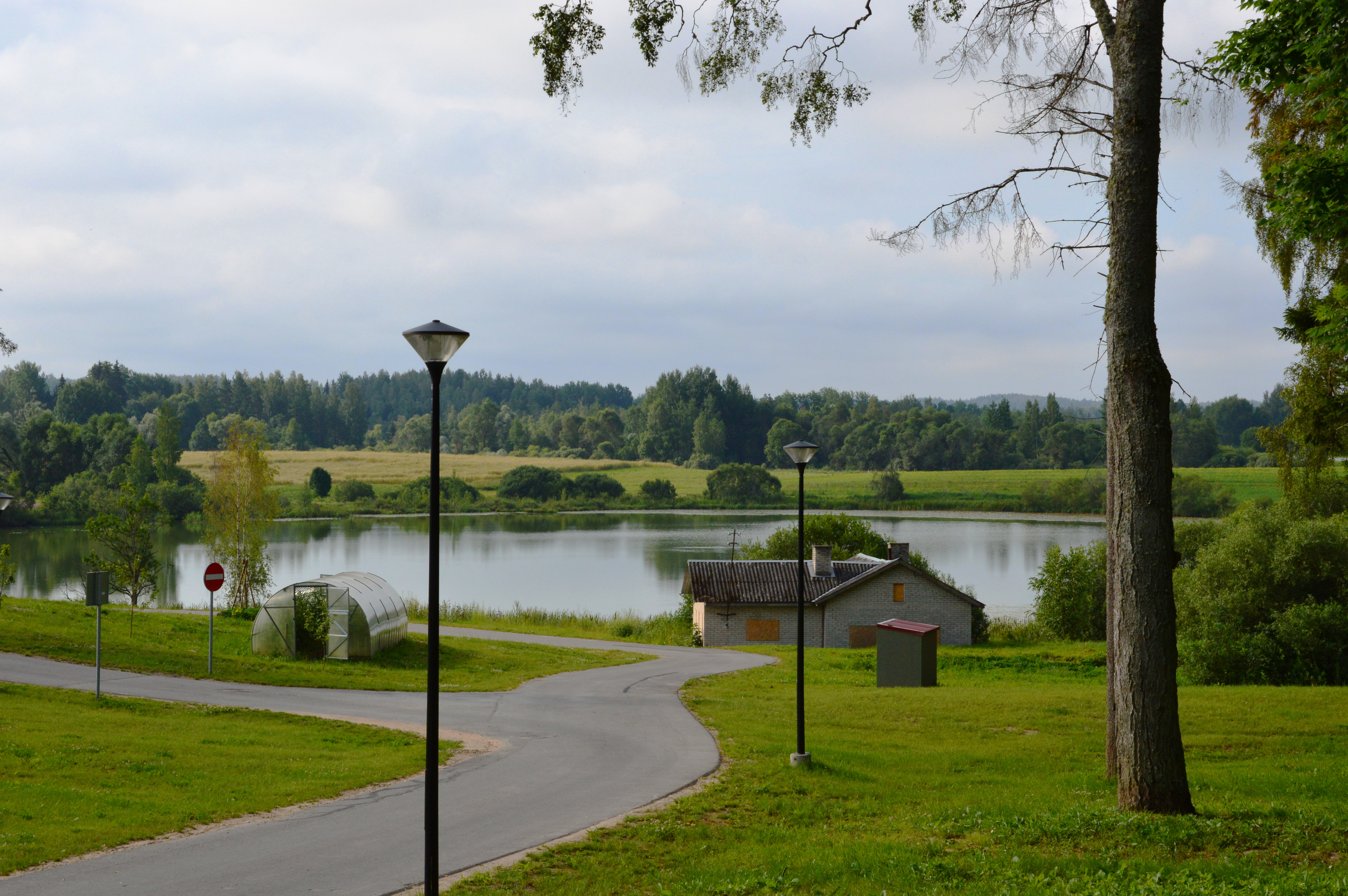
Lake Kodijärv

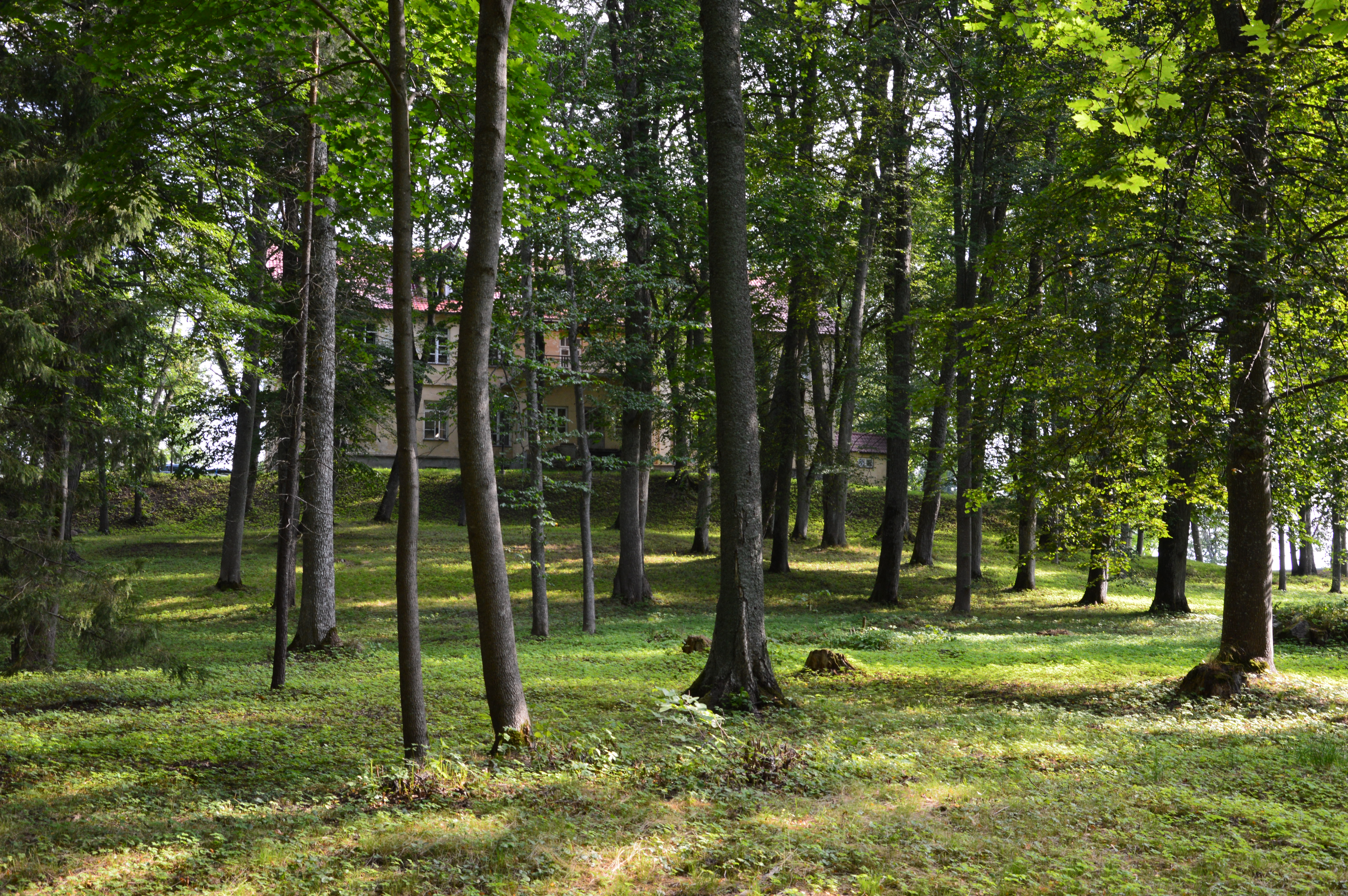
Kodijärve manor park

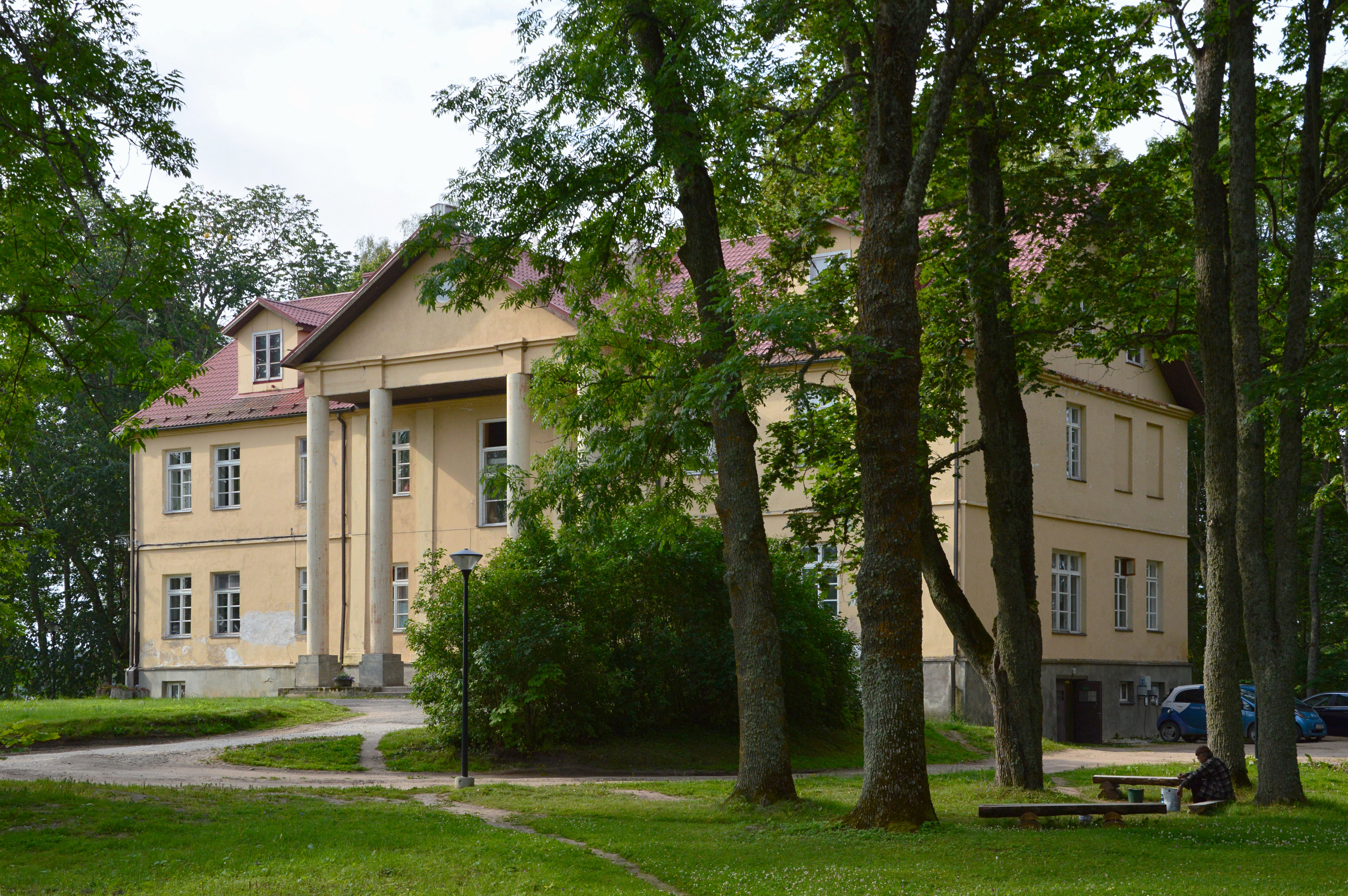
Kodijärve manor house
