= Estonian Air Navigation Services =

Company based in Estonia

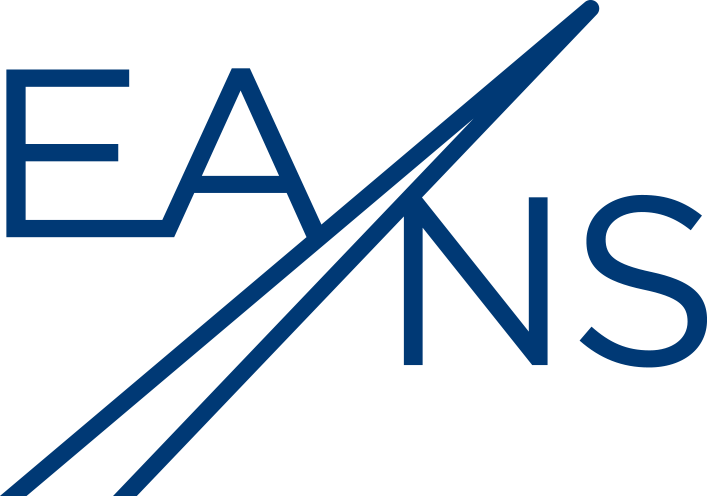
- Native name: Lennuliiklusteeninduse AS
- Formerly: Lennuliiklusteeninduse Keskus
- Company type: Public limited company
- Industry: Aviation
- Founded: December 4, 1997
- Headquarters: Kanali tee põik 3, Rae, Rae Parish, Estonia
- Key people: Tanel Rautits, Mati Tarlap, Üllar Salumäe
- Services: Provision of air navigation, air traffic services in Tallinn Flight Information Region
- Owner: Republic of Estonia (100%)
- Number of employees: 189 (2015)
- Website: www.eans.ee

Estonian Air Navigation Services (Estonian: Lennuliiklusteeninduse AS), abbreviated as EANS, is a modern, rapidly developing company operating under the auspices of the Ministry of Economic Affairs and Communications of the Republic of Estonia. It is a business entity, the major function of which is to provide services to air traffic in accordance with international standards as well as to ensure flight safety in Tallinn Flight Information Region. The sole owner of the company shares is the Republic of Estonia.

Company's main activity is provision of air navigation services in Tallinn Flight Information Region, covering the airspace over Estonian territory and some segments over the international waters that are delegated to Estonia by ICAO Convention. In plain language, air traffic control means organising air traffic into a safe, expeditious and smooth flow. The overwhelming part of the traffic handled by EANS is the overflights connecting West and East. Company cooperates with almost 1000 different customers.

All activities are governed by Estonian legislation, ICAO (International Civil Aviation Organization) and EASA (European Aviation Safety Agency) regulations; they are certified by Estonian Civil Aviation Administration in accordance with the common requirements stated in the regulation nr 550/2004 of the European Parliament and Council and regulation nr 2096/2005 of European Commission; the certificate is a state warranty that the company is functioning in accordance with the established quality requirements.

EANS consists of seven structural units: Air Traffic Management, Aerodromes, CNS/ATM, Aeronautical Information Management, Development, Quality and Finance Departments. The number of employees exceeds 170 – one third of them are air traffic controllers. Their professional training is provided by Estonian Aviation Academy.

The activities of different departments (AIS – since 2002, CNS/ATM – since 2004, ATM – since 2005, Development Department – since 2008) have been recognised compliant with ISO 9001:2000 and later ISO 9001:2008 quality management standards and established requirements.

== Membership in international organisations ==
- 1992 – ICAO – International Civil Aviation Organization – becoming its 166th member state; it urged us to provide the air traffic over our territory with the services meeting internationally recognized standards and recommended practices.
- 1995 – European Civil Aviation Conference (ECAC).
- 2000 – CANSO – and organisation of commercialised ANS providers.
- 2002 – Nordic cooperation, which in 2007 got the name of North European ANS Providers – NEAP. In 2012 the cooperation was reorganised and received a new name – Borealis alliance.
- End of 2012 – establishment of NEFAB – North European Functional Airspace Block, covering Norway, Finland, Estonia and Latvia.
- 2015 – Estonia joins EUROCONTROL

== See also ==
- List of the busiest airports in the Baltic states
