= Sulu, Tartu County =

Village in Estonia

Sulu
- Village
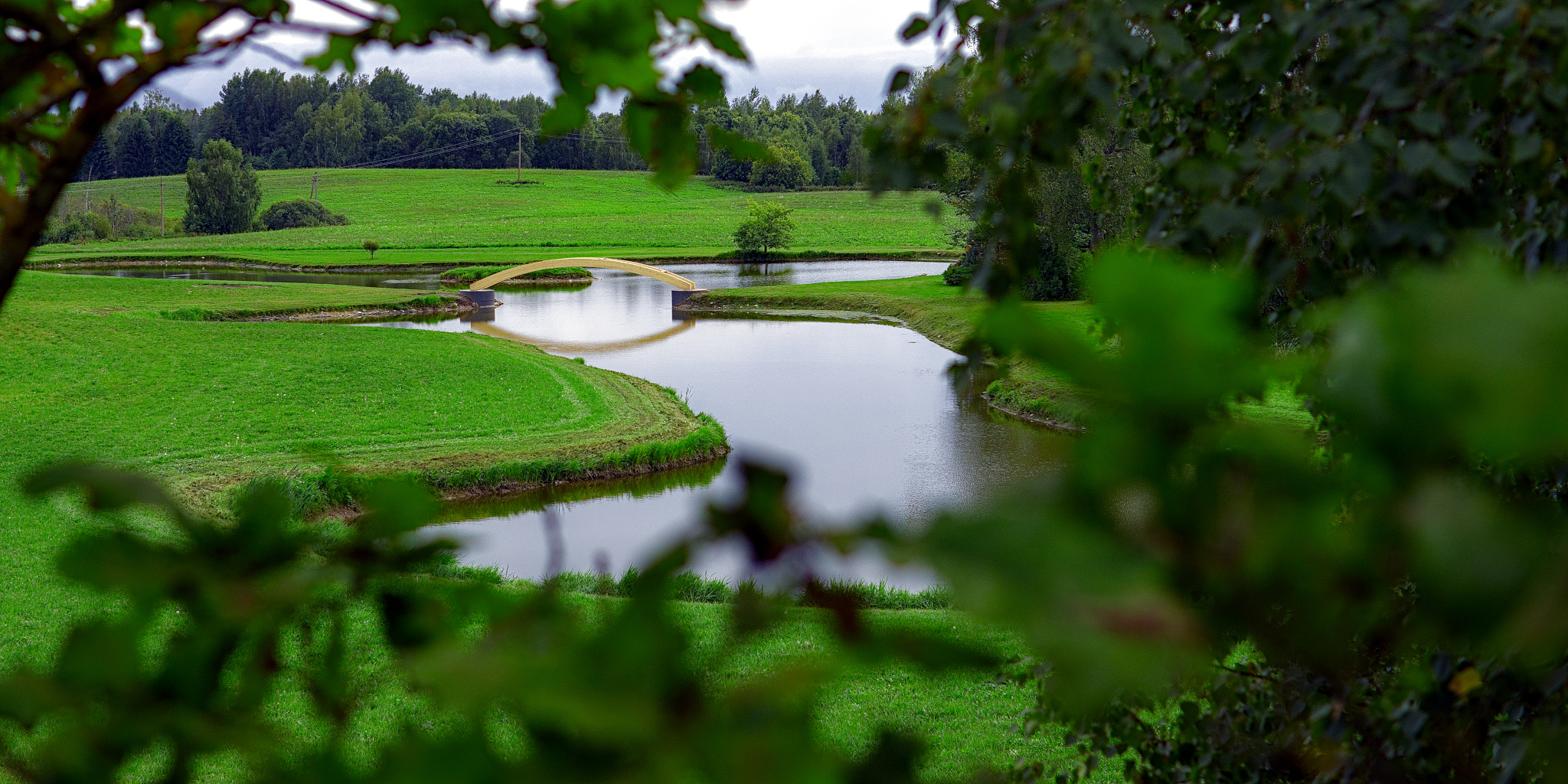
- Sulu küla, Tartu

- Location within Estonia
- Coordinates: 58°12′N 26°34′E
- Country: Estonia
- County: Tartu County
- Parish: Kambja Parish

Population
  - Total: 58
- Time zone: UTC+2 (EET)
  - Summer (DST): UTC+3 (EEST)

Sulu is a village in Kambja Parish, Tartu County in eastern Estonia.
