= Paali =

Village in Estonia

Coordinates: 58°12′12″N 26°42′30″E

- Village
- Interactive map of Paali
- Country: Estonia
- County: Tartu County
- Parish: Kambja Parish
- Time zone: UTC+2 (EET)
  - Summer (DST): UTC+3 (EEST)

Paali is a village in Kambja Parish, Tartu County, Estonia.
