= Madise, Tartu County =

Village in Estonia

Coordinates: 58°14′36″N 26°44′00″E

- Village
- Interactive map of Madise, Tartu County
- Country: Estonia
- County: Tartu County
- Parish: Kambja Parish
- Time zone: UTC+2 (EET)
  - Summer (DST): UTC+3 (EEST)

Madise is a village in Kambja Parish, Tartu County in eastern Estonia.
