= Kullaga =

Village in Estonia

- Village
- Location in Estonia
- Coordinates: 58°12′N 26°37′E
- Country: Estonia
- County: Tartu County
- Parish: Kambja Parish
- Time zone: UTC+2 (EET)
  - Summer (DST): UTC+3 (EEST)

Kullaga is a village in Kambja Parish, Tartu County in eastern Estonia.
