= Porijõgi =

River in Estonia

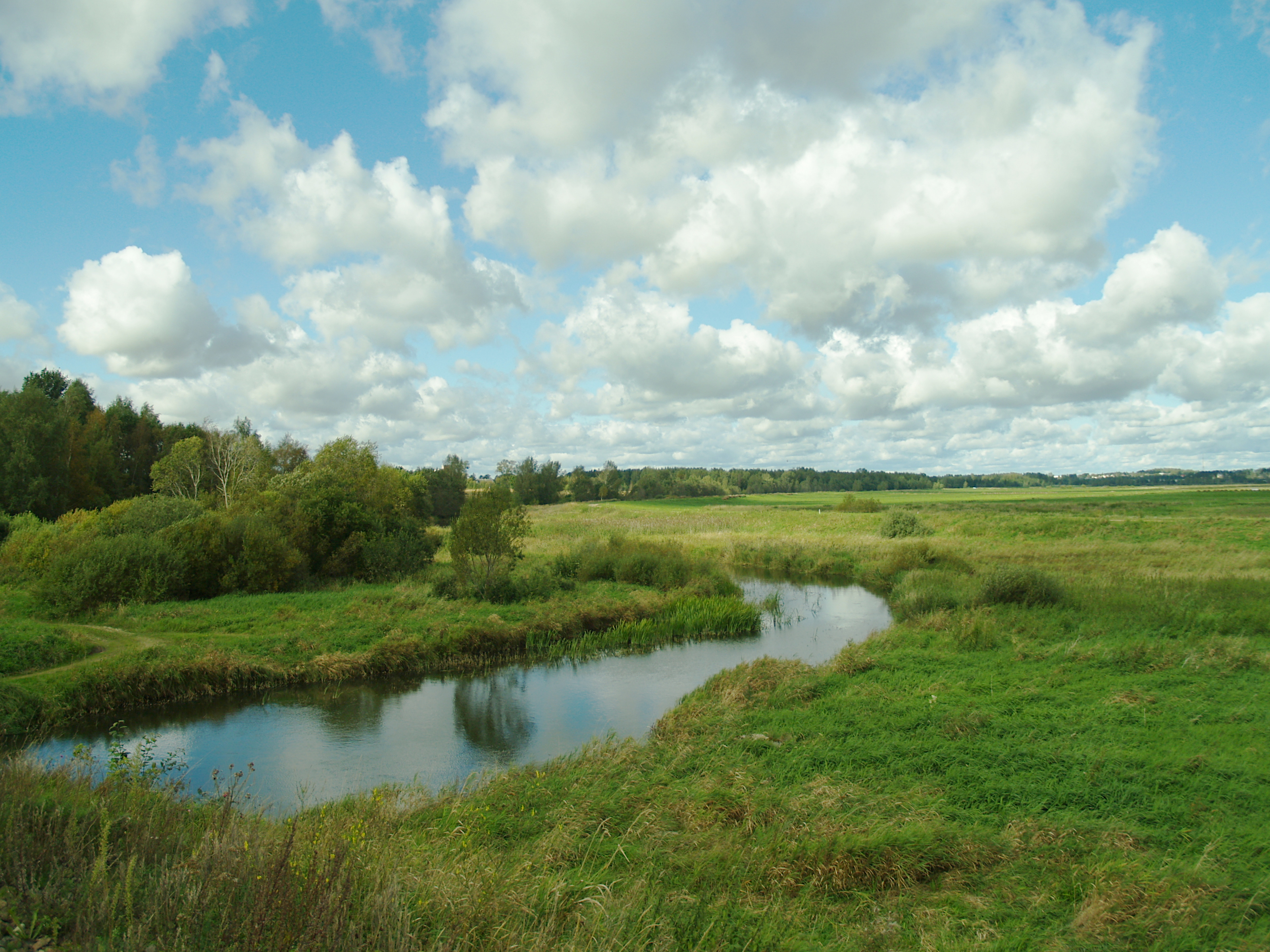
- The Porijõgi in the northeastern part of the village of Ülenurme

Location
- Country: Estonia

Physical characteristics
- Mouth: Emajõgi
  - coordinates: 58°20′16″N 26°46′33″E
- Length: 50.2 km
- Basin size: 298 km²

The Porijõgi is a river in Põlva and Tartu counties, Estonia. The river is 50.2 km long, and its basin size is 298 km^{2}. It discharges into the Emajõgi.

Trout and grayling live in the river.

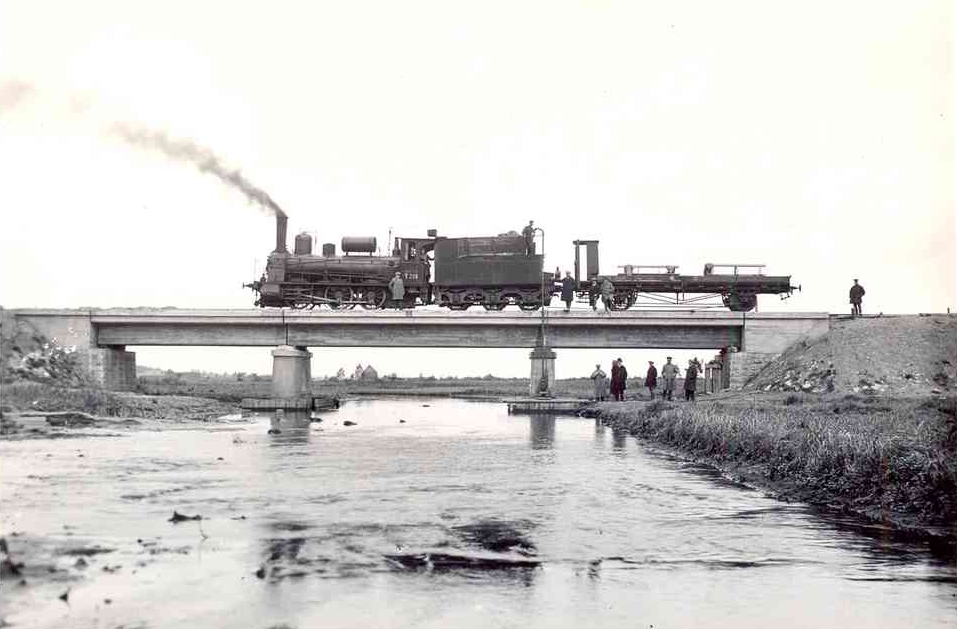
Reola Bridge over the Porijõgi on the railway section from Tartu to Petseri c. 1930. The steam locomotive is refilling water from the river.
