= Kavandu =

Village in Estonia

- Village
- Location in Estonia
- Coordinates: 58°12′N 26°39′E
- Country: Estonia
- County: Tartu County
- Parish: Kambja Parish
- Time zone: UTC+2 (EET)
  - Summer (DST): UTC+3 (EEST)

Kavandu is a village in Kambja Parish, Tartu County in eastern Estonia.

Kavandu is the birthplace of Ignatsi Jaak (ca 1670–1741; (:et)), a schoolteacher and sacristan, the most famous student of scholar Bengt Gottfried Forselius.
