= Sirvaku =

Village in Estonia

- Village
- Location in Estonia
- Coordinates: 58°13′9″N 26°47′13″E
- Country: Estonia
- County: Tartu
- Parish: Kambja
- Time zone: UTC+2 (EET)
  - Summer (DST): UTC+3 (EEST)

Sirvaku is a village in Kambja Parish, Tartu County in eastern Estonia.
