= Virulase =

Village in Estonia

- Village
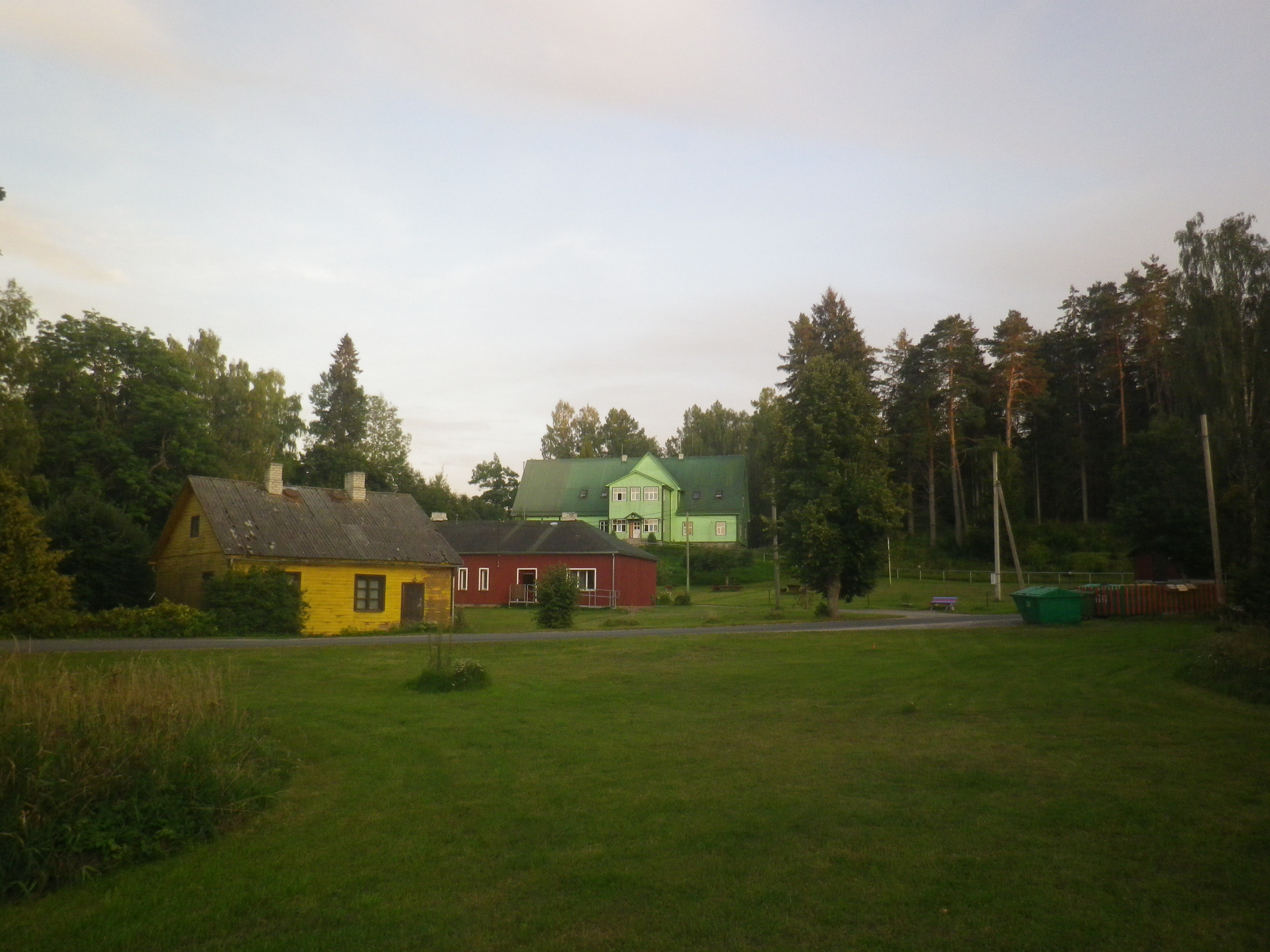
- Aarike Care Center in Virulase

- Location within Estonia
- Coordinates: 58°15′N 26°38′E
- Country: Estonia
- County: Tartu County
- Parish: Kambja Parish
- Time zone: UTC+2 (EET)
  - Summer (DST): UTC+3 (EEST)

Virulase is a village in Kambja Parish, Tartu County in eastern Estonia.
