= Palumäe =

Village in Estonia

Coordinates: 58°11′N 26°34′E

- Village
- Interactive map of Palumäe
- Country: Estonia
- County: Tartu County
- Parish: Kambja Parish
- Time zone: UTC+2 (EET)
  - Summer (DST): UTC+3 (EEST)

Palumäe is a village in Kambja Parish, Tartu County in eastern Estonia.
