= Mäeküla, Tartu County =

Village in Estonia

Coordinates: 58°13′58″N 26°43′34″E

- Village
- Interactive map of Mäeküla, Tartu County
- Country: Estonia
- County: Tartu County
- Parish: Kambja Parish
- Time zone: UTC+2 (EET)
  - Summer (DST): UTC+3 (EEST)

Mäeküla is a village in Kambja Parish, Tartu County in eastern Estonia.
