= Oomiste =

Village in Estonia

Coordinates: 58°12′N 26°31′E

- Village
- Interactive map of Oomiste
- Country: Estonia
- County: Tartu County
- Parish: Kambja Parish
- Time zone: UTC+2 (EET)
  - Summer (DST): UTC+3 (EEST)

Oomiste is a village in Kambja Parish, Tartu County in eastern Estonia.
