= Pühi =

Village in Estonia

- Village
- Location within Estonia
- Coordinates: 58°14′N 26°39′E
- Country: Estonia
- County: Tartu County
- Parish: Kambja Parish

Population (2004)
  - Total: 81
- Time zone: UTC+2 (EET)
  - Summer (DST): UTC+3 (EEST)

Pühi is a village in Kambja Parish, Tartu County in eastern Estonia.
