= Lemmatsi =

Village in Estonia

- Village
- Location in Estonia
- Coordinates: 58°20′17″N 26°39′02″E
- Country: Estonia
- County: Tartu County
- Municipality: Kambja Parish

Population (01.09.2010)
  - Total: 177

Lemmatsi is a village in Kambja Parish, Tartu County, Estonia. It has a population of 177 (as of 1 September 2010).
