= Estonian Aviation Academy =

Aviation school near Tartu, Estonia

- Eesti Lennuakadeemia
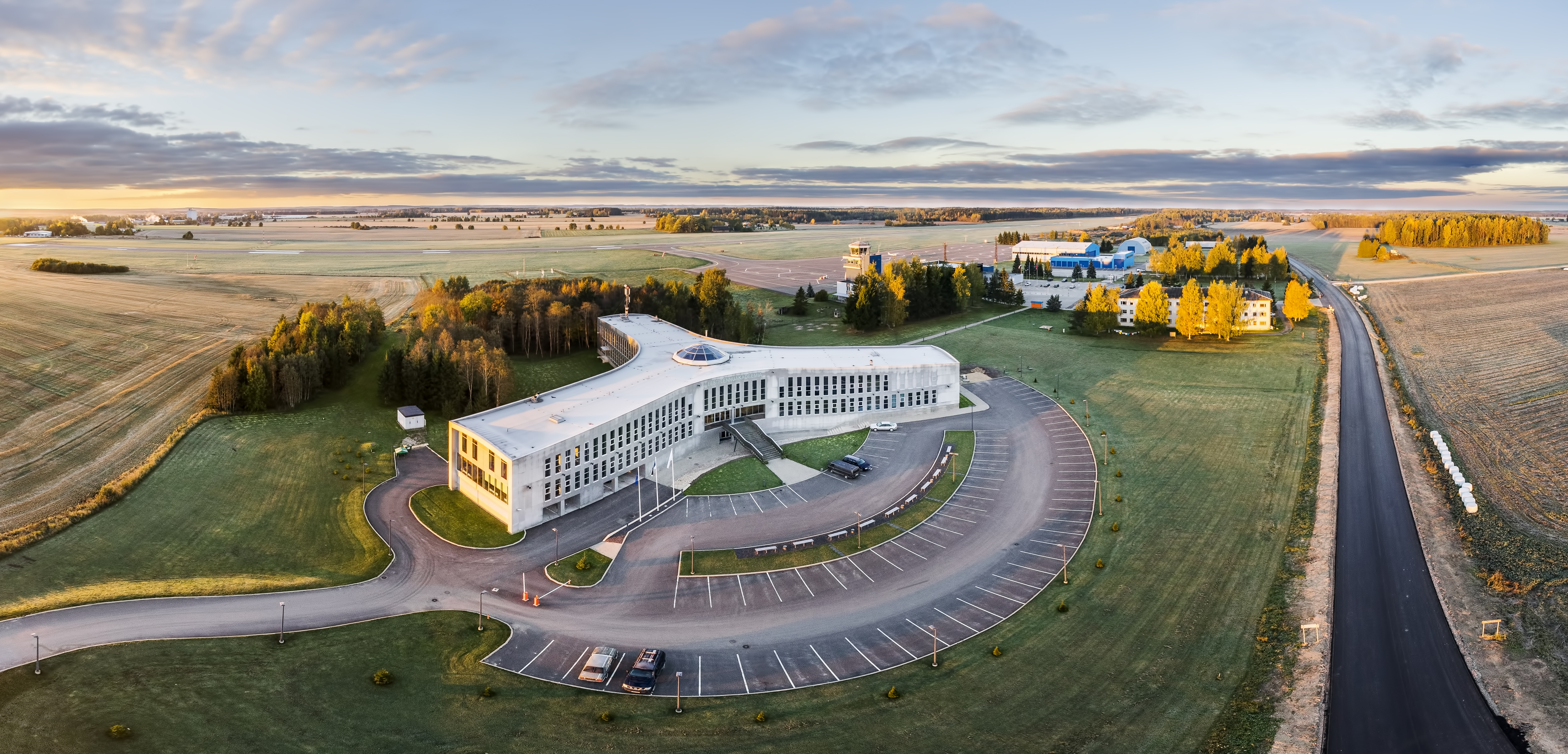
- Estonian Aviation Academy
- Former name: Tartu Aviation College
- Motto: Viribus unitis ad altitudines
- Motto in English: With efforts to heights
- Type: Public university system
- Established: April 13, 1993; 33 years ago
- Rector: Koit Kaskel
- Location: Reola, Tartu County, Estonia; 58.3107°N 26.6936°E
- Language: Estonian, English
- Colors: Navy and white
- Website: www.eava.ee
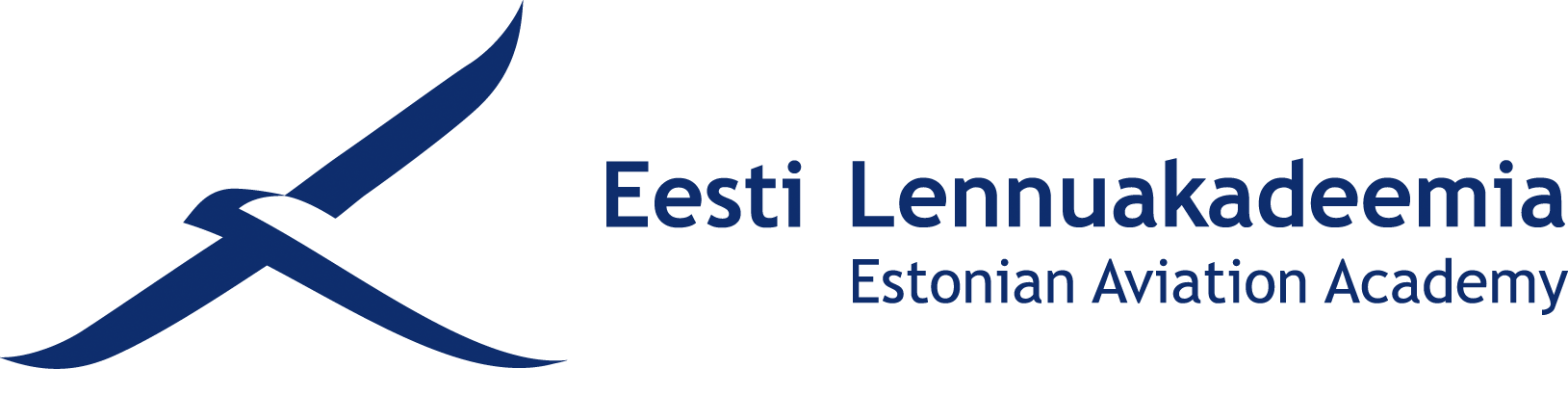

Estonian Aviation Academy (Estonian: Eesti Lennuakadeemia) is a state-owned institution educating and training personnel for Estonian aviation enterprises and organizations. The academy is situated near Tartu Airport. Instruction at the Estonian Aviation Academy meets the curricular requirements of the country's Ministry of Education and Research, as well as international agencies (ICAO, JAA, EASA and EUROCONTROL).

== Mission ==
The mission of the Estonian Aviation Academy is to educate, train aviation personnel (at international standards), develop national aviation culture, and support the development of activities in the field of aviation.

== Learning environment ==
The main building, that was completed in 2011, is situated beside of the Tartu Airport.

== Overview of Specialties ==
- Air traffic services
- Management of aviation communication and navigation surveillance
- Aircraft piloting
  - Airplane piloting
  - Helicopter piloting
- Aviation management
- Aircraft engineering

== Rectors ==
- Illari Lään (-2020)
- Koit Kaskel (2020-)

== Co-operation partners in Estonia ==
Estonian Aviation Academy has developed links with aviation enterprises and higher educational institutions in Estonia and abroad, including:

- Estonian Air Force
- Estonian Air Navigation Services
- Estonian Aviation Museum
- (Estonian) Police and Border Guard Aviation Group
- Estonian Civil Aviation Administration
- Estonian National Defence College
- Estonian University of Life Sciences
- Magnetic MRO (ex. Air Maintenance Estonia)
- Ministry of Economic Affairs and Communications
- Ministry of Education and Research
- Pakker Avio
- Tallinn Airport, Ltd.
- Tallinn University
- Tallinn University of Applied Sciences
- Tallinn University of Technology
- University of Tartu
- Ülenurme High School

== Co-operation partners in other countries ==
- (Turkey) Anadolu University School of Aviation
- (Finland) Avia College
- (Luxembourg) EUROCONTROL Institute of ANS
- (Finland) Helsinki-Vantaa Airport
- (Germany) Hochschule Bremen
- (Netherlands) Hogeschool van Amsterdam
- (Finland) Finnair
- (Belgium) Katholieke Hogeschool Kempen
- (Germany) Lufthansa Technical Training
- (Sweden) Lund University School of Aviation
- (Sweden) Lycon Engineering AB
- (United Kingdom) Mayflower College
- (Poland) National Defence University of Warsaw
- (Finland) Patria Pilot Training OY
- (Latvia) Riga Technical University
- (Sweden) SAS Flight Academy
- (Latvia) Transport and Telecommunication Institute
- (United States) University of Maryland Eastern Shore
- (Lithuania) Vilnius Gediminas Technical University
- (Slovakia) Technical University of Košice

== Gallery ==
(view as a 360° interactive panorama)

(view as a 360° interactive panorama)

(view as a 360° interactive panorama)

(view as a 360° interactive panorama)

(view as a 360° interactive panorama)

(view as a 360° interactive panorama)
