= Uhti =

Village in Estonia

- Village
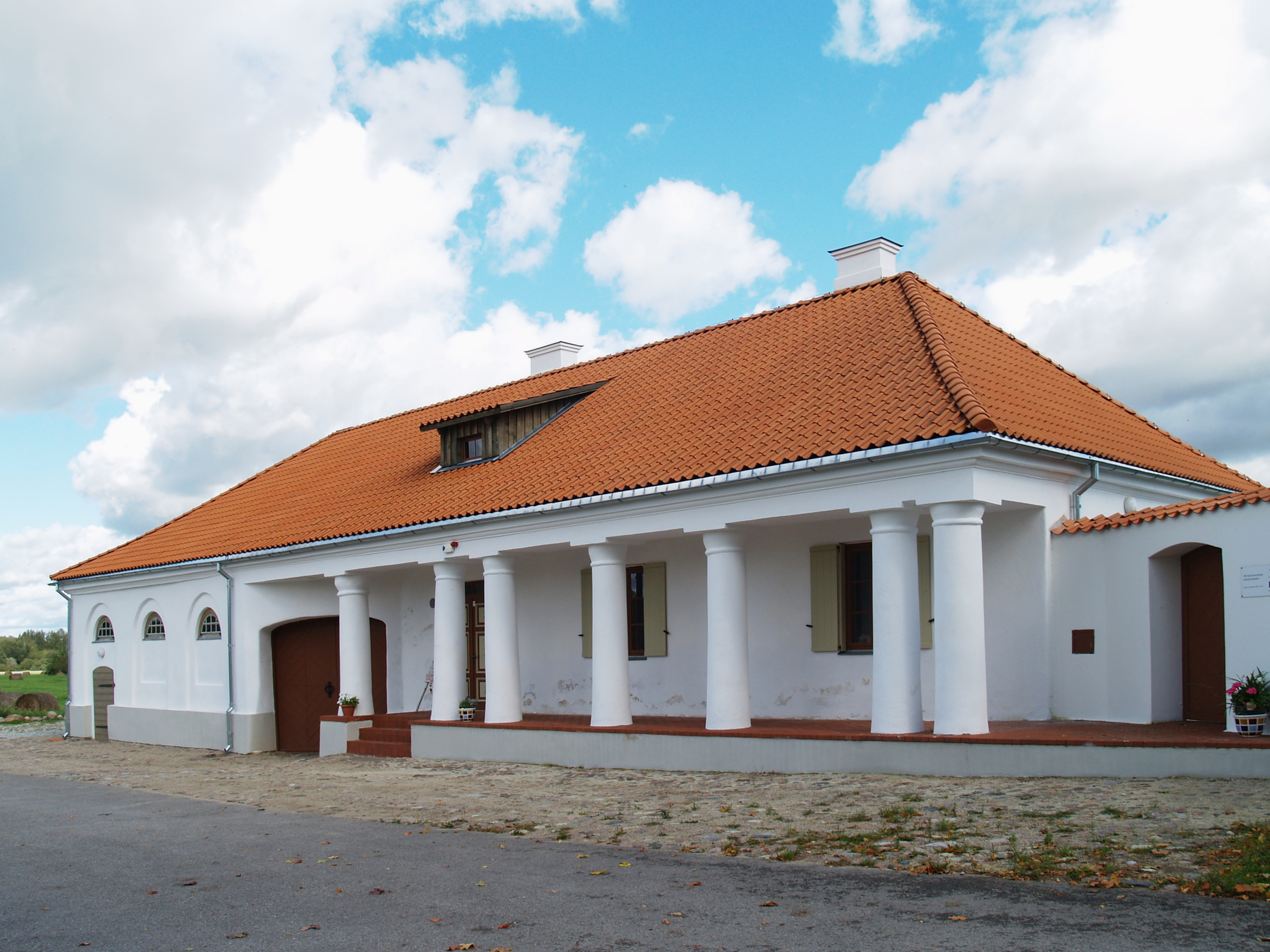
- Uhti tavern

- Location in Estonia
- Coordinates: 58°17′19″N 26°43′12″E
- Country: Estonia
- County: Tartu County
- Municipality: Kambja Parish

Population (1 September 2010)
  - Total: 301

Uhti is a village in Kambja Parish, Tartu County, Estonia. It has a population of 301 (as of 1 September 2010).

Uhti has a station on Tartu–Koidula railway.

== Gallery ==
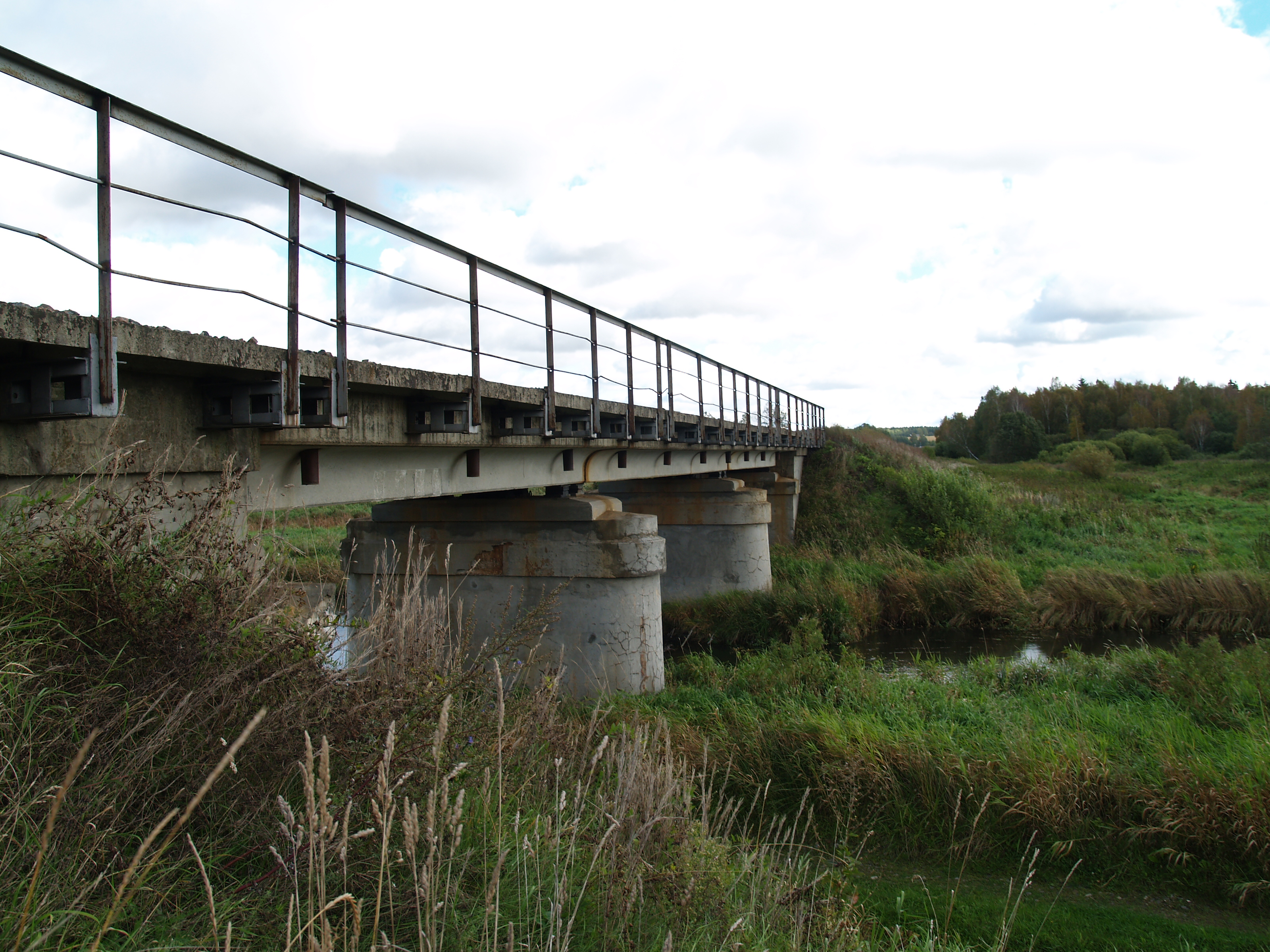
Uhti railway bridge

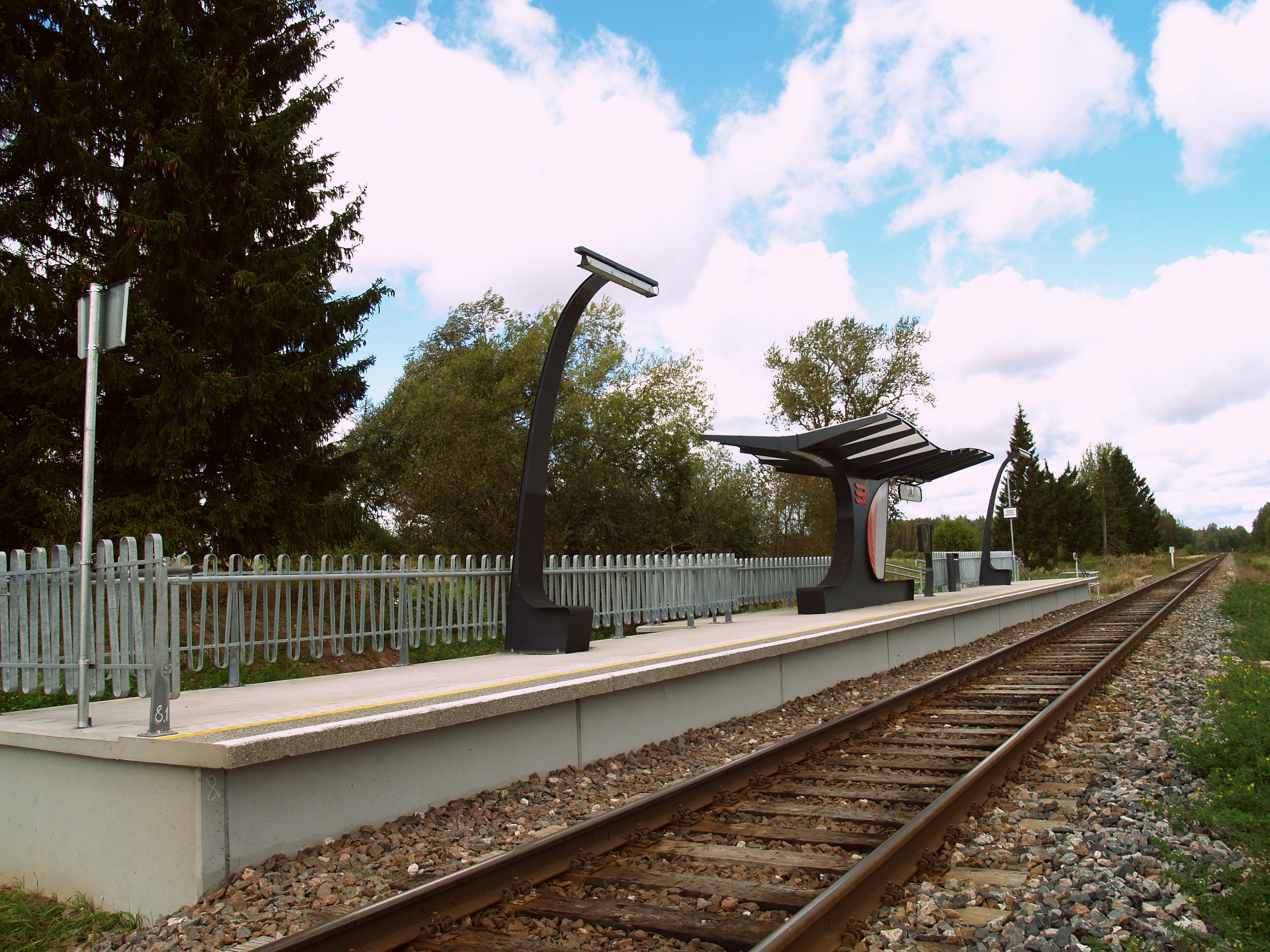
Uhti railway station

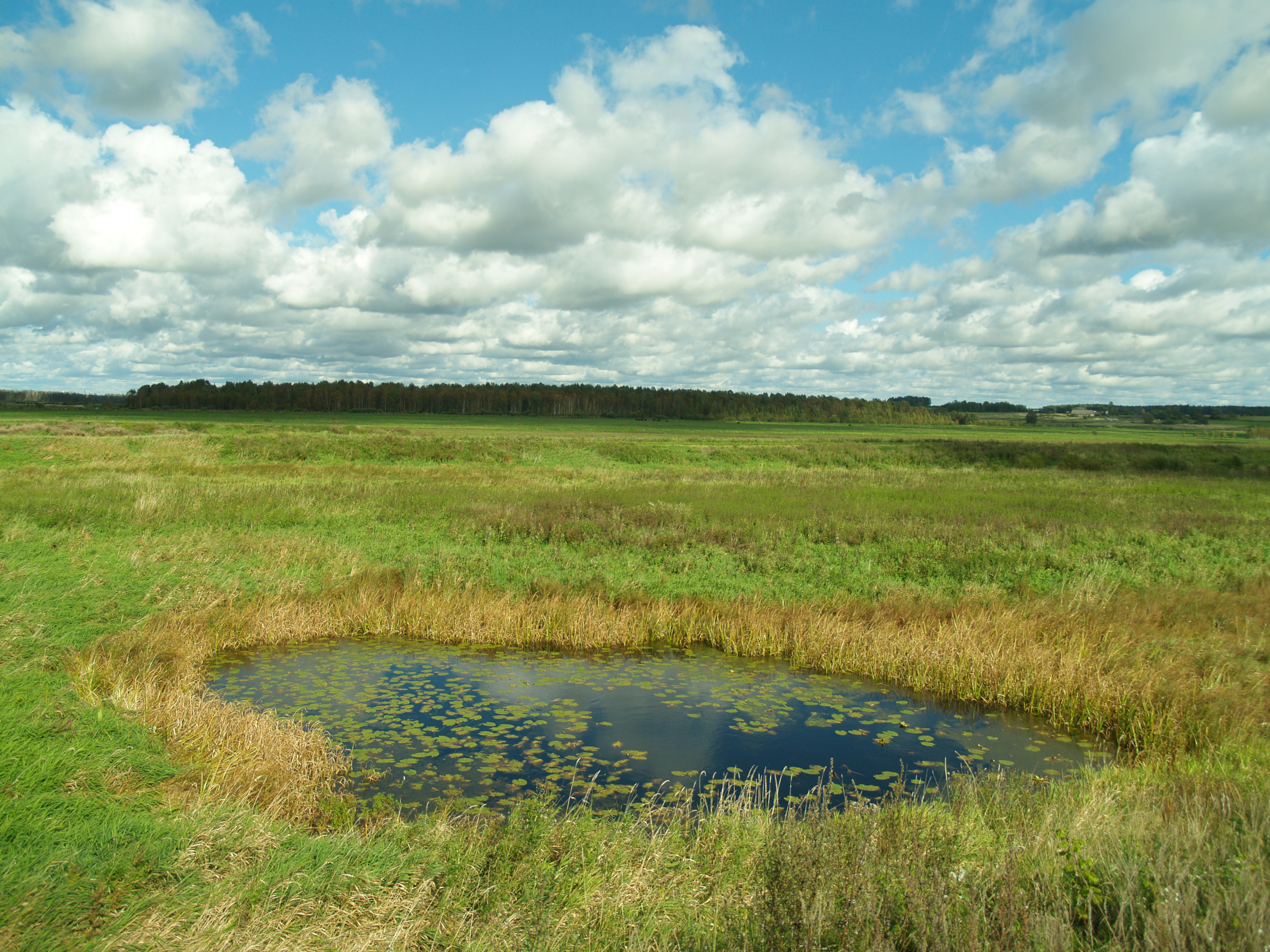
Surrounding landscape

Preceding station	Elron	Following station
Ülenurme towards Tallinn	Tallinn–Tartu–Koidula	Reola towards Koidula
