= Lepiku, Tartu County =

Village in Estonia

Lepiku
- Village
- Location in Estonia
- Coordinates: 58°16′19″N 26°41′57″E
- Country: Estonia
- County: Tartu County
- Municipality: Kambja Parish

Population (01.09.2010)
  - Total: 110

Lepiku is a village in Kambja Parish, Tartu County, Estonia. It has a population of 110 (as of 1 September 2010).
