= Laane, Tartu County =

Village in Estonia

Laane
- Village
- Location in Estonia
- Coordinates: 58°18′47″N 26°39′28″E
- Country: Estonia
- County: Tartu County
- Municipality: Kambja Parish

Population (31.12.2011)
  - Total: 155

Laane is a village in Kambja Parish, Tartu County, Estonia. It has a population of 155 (as of 31 December 2011). Ropka railway station on the Tartu–Valga railway is located on the border of Laane and Külitse villages.
