= Leonhard Kukk =

Estonian weightlifter

Personal information
- Nationality: Estonian
- Born: 12 August 1906 Pangodi, Estonia
- Died: 16 September 1941 (aged 35) Tallinn, Estonia

Sport
- Sport: Weightlifting

Leonhard Kukk (12 August 1906 – 16 September 1941) was an Estonian weightlifter. He competed in the men's middleweight event at the 1928 Summer Olympics. Kukk was a civilian who was shot dead by Soviet soldiers during World War II.
