= Räni =

Borough in Estonia

- Small borough
- Location in Estonia
- Coordinates: 58°21′08″N 26°39′58″E
- Country: Estonia
- County: Tartu
- Parish: Kambja

Population (01.09.2010)
  - Total: 466

Räni (German: Renningshof) is a small borough in Kambja Parish, Tartu County in southern Estonia, it is located on the southwestern side of the city of Tartu. It has a population of 466 (as of 1 September 2010).
