= Soosilla =

Village in Estonia

- Village
- Location in Estonia
- Coordinates: 58°19′14″N 26°35′17″E
- Country: Estonia
- County: Tartu County
- Municipality: Kambja Parish

Population (01.09.2010)
  - Total: 48

Soosilla is a village in Kambja Parish, Tartu County, Estonia. It has a population of 48 (as of 1 September 2010).
