= Läti, Tartu County =

Village in Estonia

Läti
- Village
- Location in Estonia
- Coordinates: 58°16′44″N 26°39′19″E
- Country: Estonia
- County: Tartu County
- Municipality: Kambja Parish

Population (01.09.2010)
  - Total: 20

Läti is a village in Kambja Parish, Tartu County, Estonia. It has a population of 20 (as of 1 September 2010).
