= Täsvere =

Village in Estonia

- Village
- Location in Estonia
- Coordinates: 58°17′54″N 26°36′49″E
- Country: Estonia
- County: Tartu County
- Municipality: Kambja Parish

Population (01.09.2010)
  - Total: 16

Täsvere is a village in Kambja Parish, Tartu County, Estonia. It has a population of 16 (as of 1 September 2010).
