= Ülenurme =

Borough in Estonia

- Small borough
- Location in Estonia
- Coordinates: 58°18′58″N 26°43′17″E
- Country: Estonia
- County: Tartu County
- Municipality: Ülenurme Parish

Population (01.09.2010)
  - Total: 1,574

Ülenurme is a small borough (Estonian: alevik) in Tartu County, in Kambja Parish, in Estonia. It was the administrative centre of Ülenurme Parish. Ülenurme has a population of 1,574 (as of 1 September 2010).

Tartu Airport, which is sometimes called Ülenurme Airport, is located near Ülenurme in the village of Reola.

Ülenurme has a station on Tartu–Koidula railway.

== Gallery ==
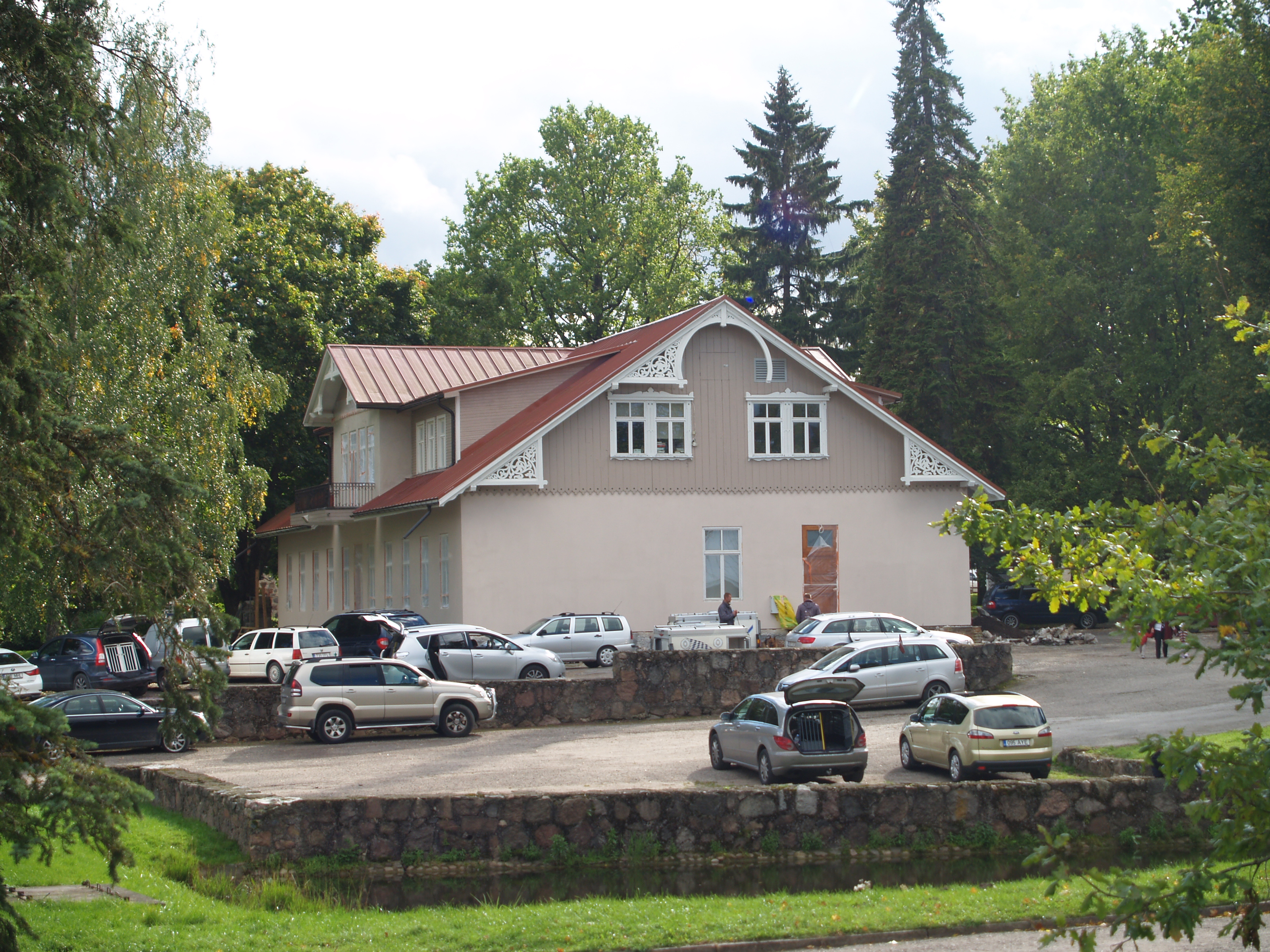
Main building of Ülenurme Manor, now the Estonian Agricultural Museum

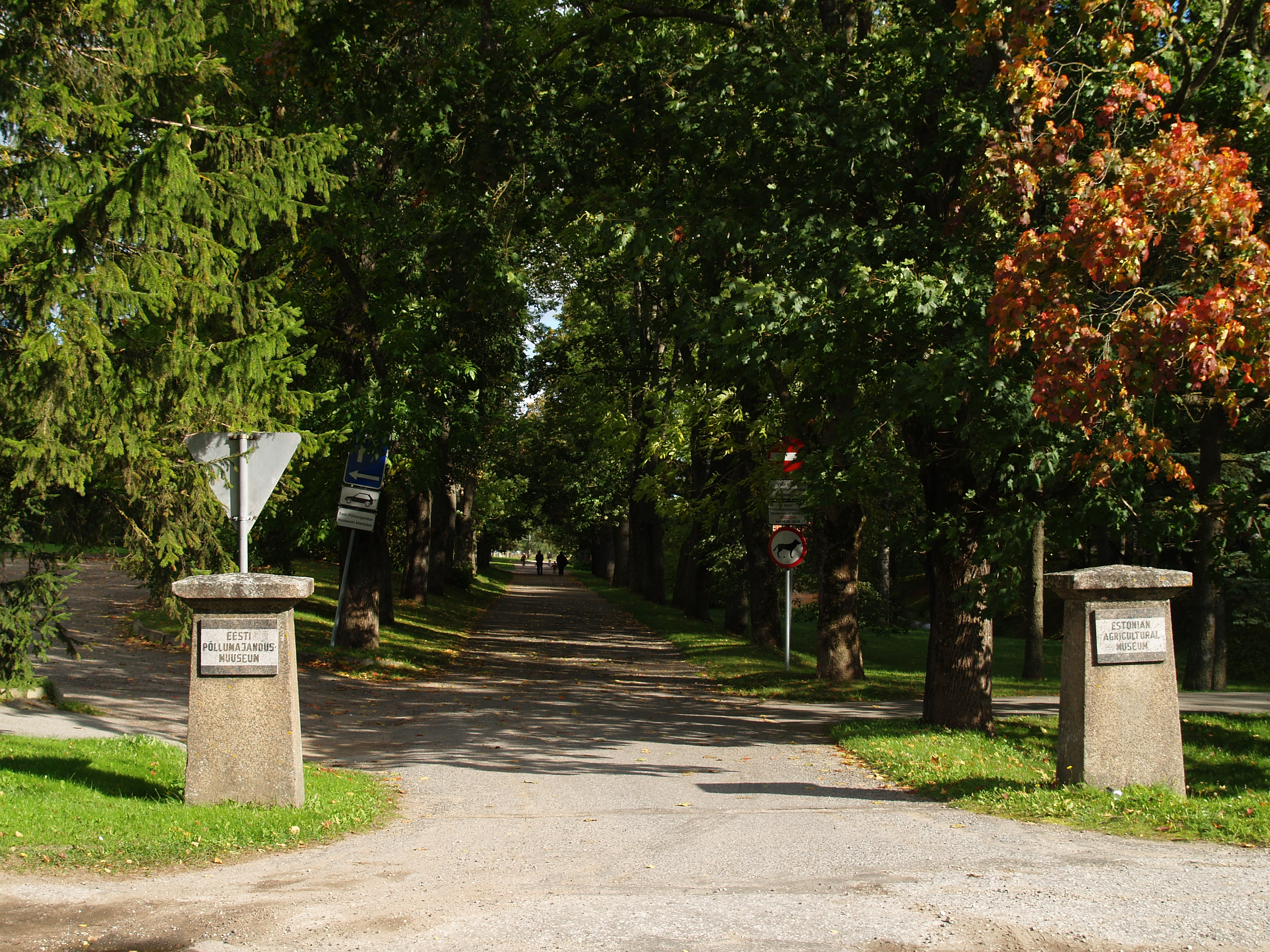
Manor park

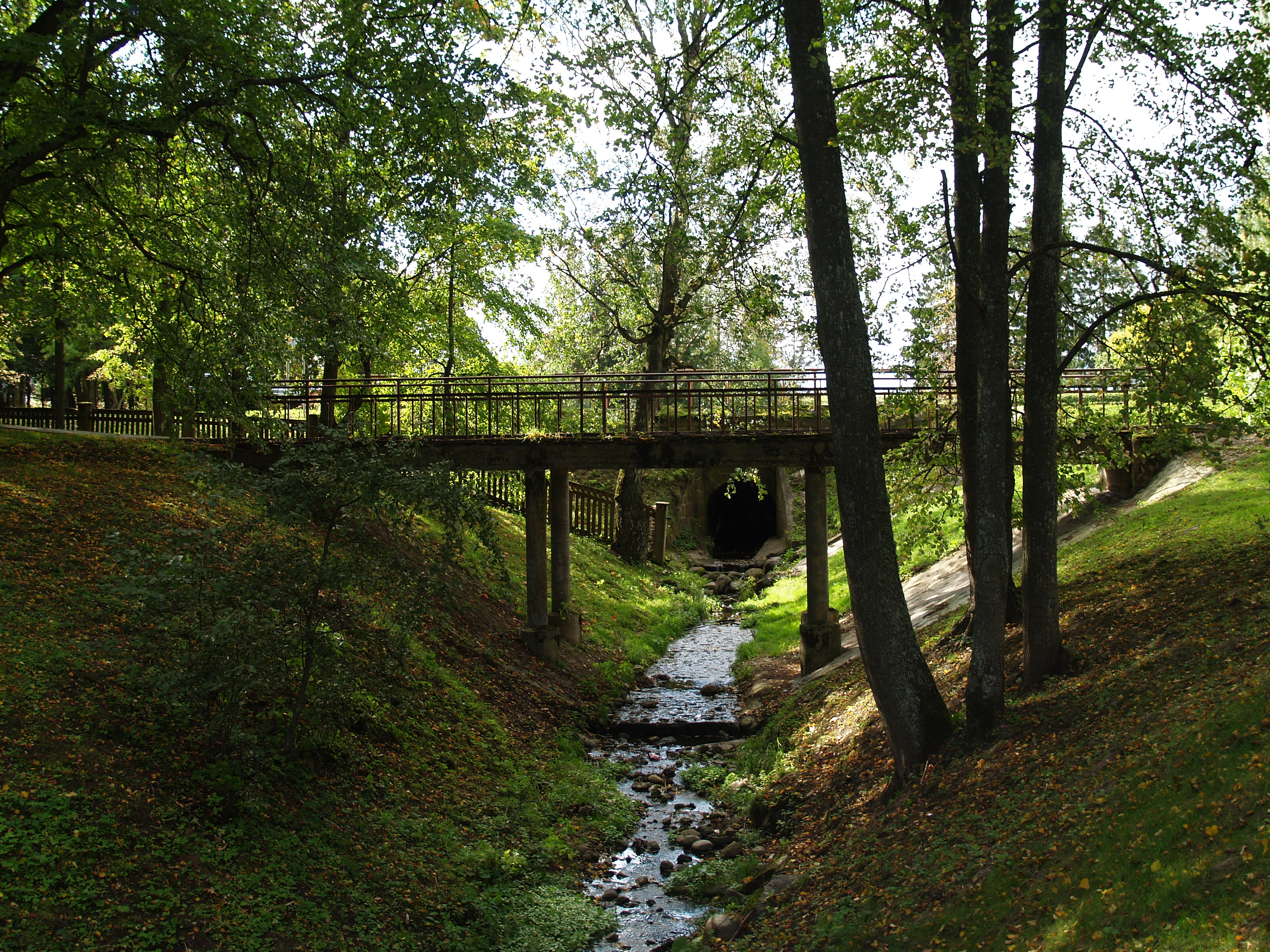

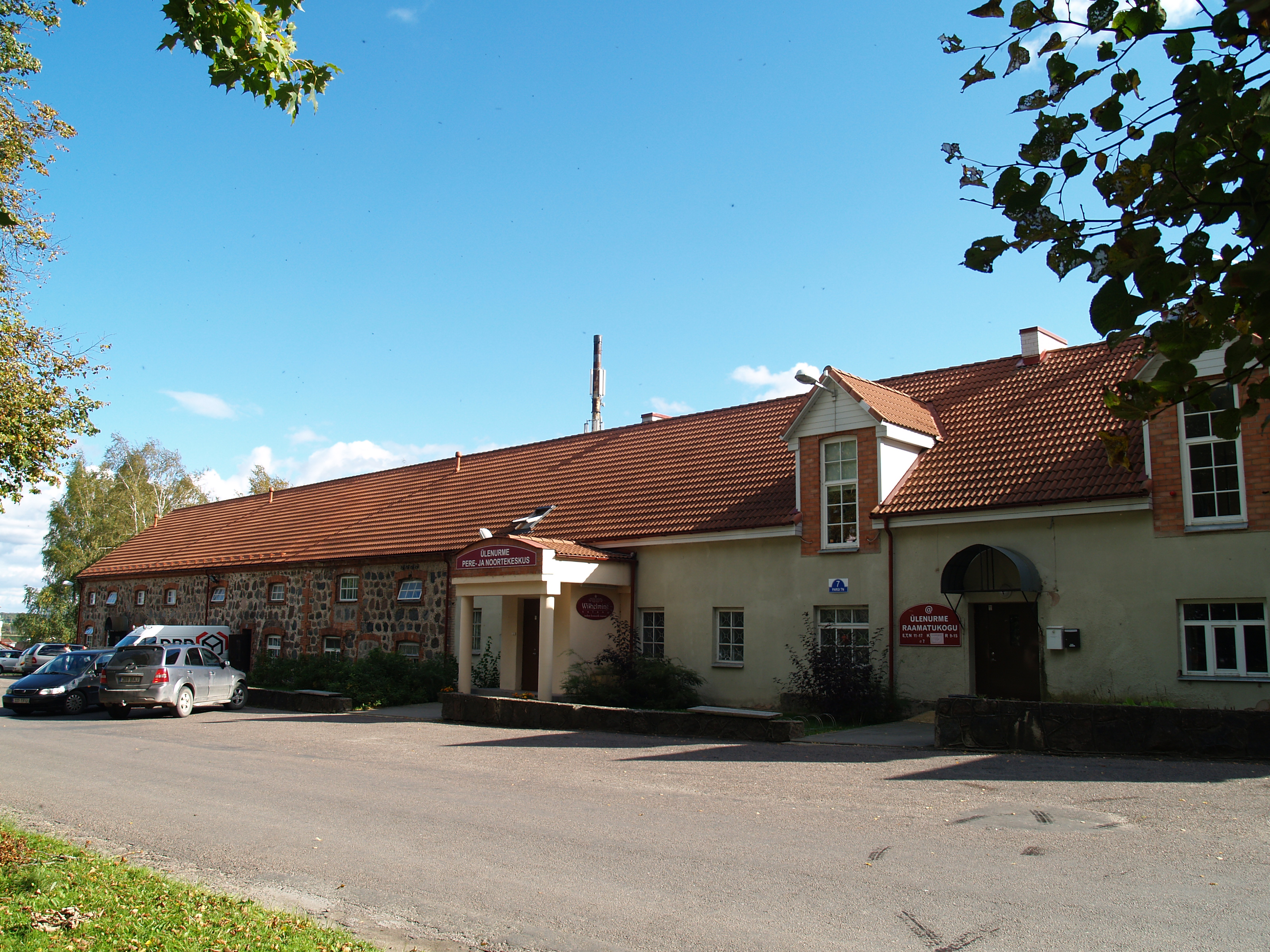
Ülenurme library and family and youth centre

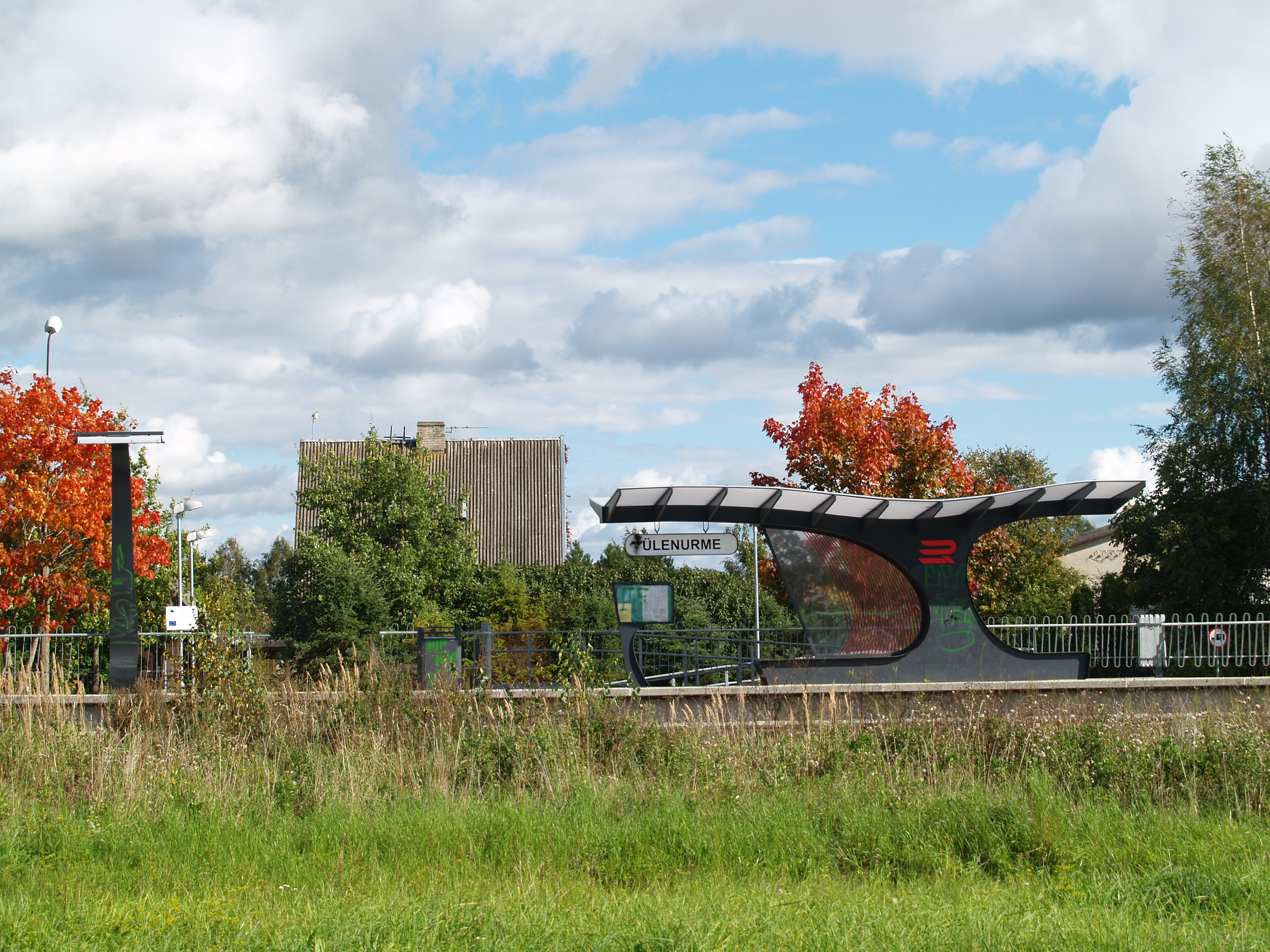
Ülenurme railway station

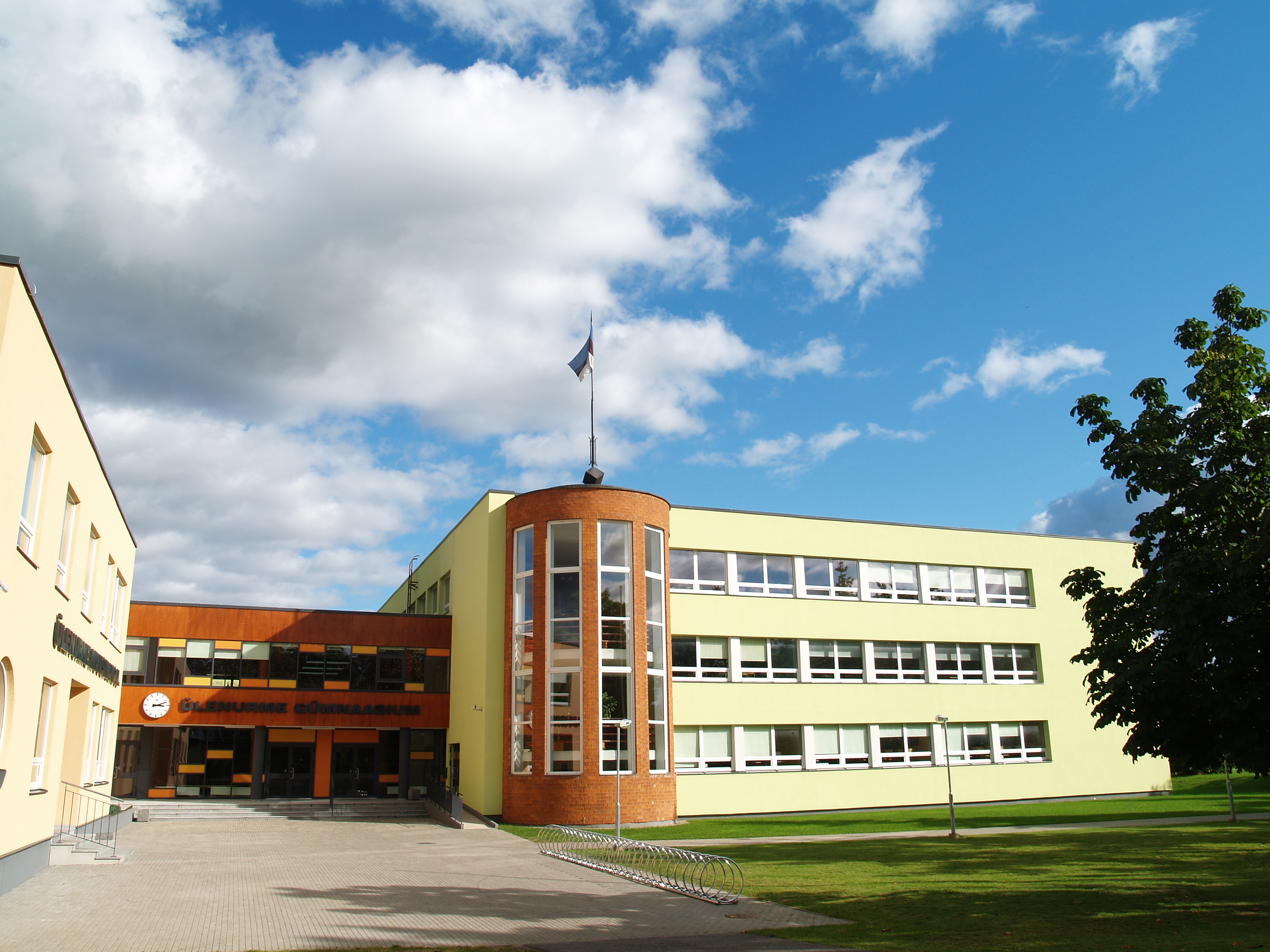
Ülenurme High School

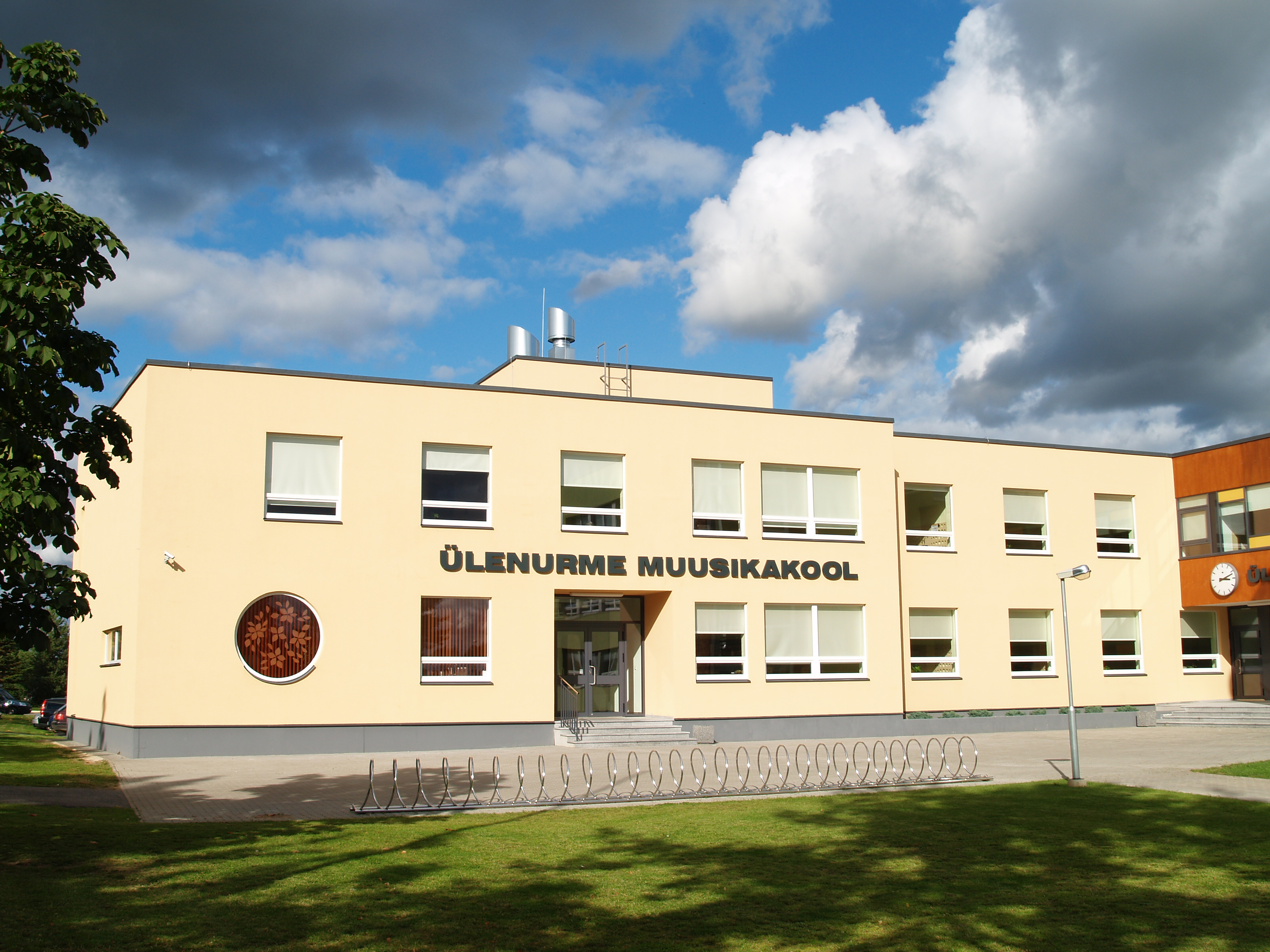
Ülenurme Music School

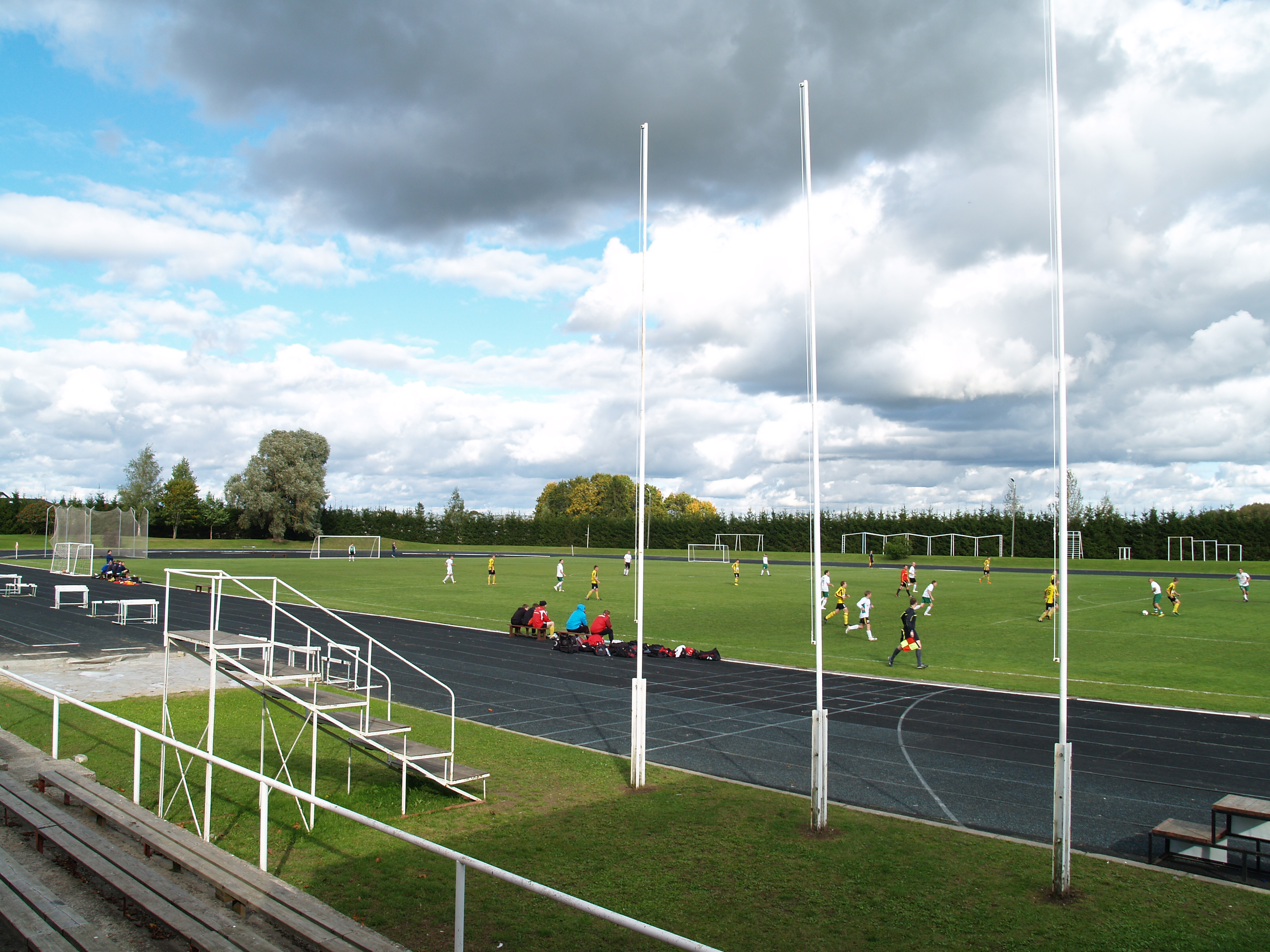
Ülenurme stadium

| Preceding station | Elron | Following station |
|---|---|---|
| Kirsi towards Tallinn | Tallinn–Tartu–Koidula | Uhti towards Koidula |
