= Soinaste =

Village in Estonia

- Village
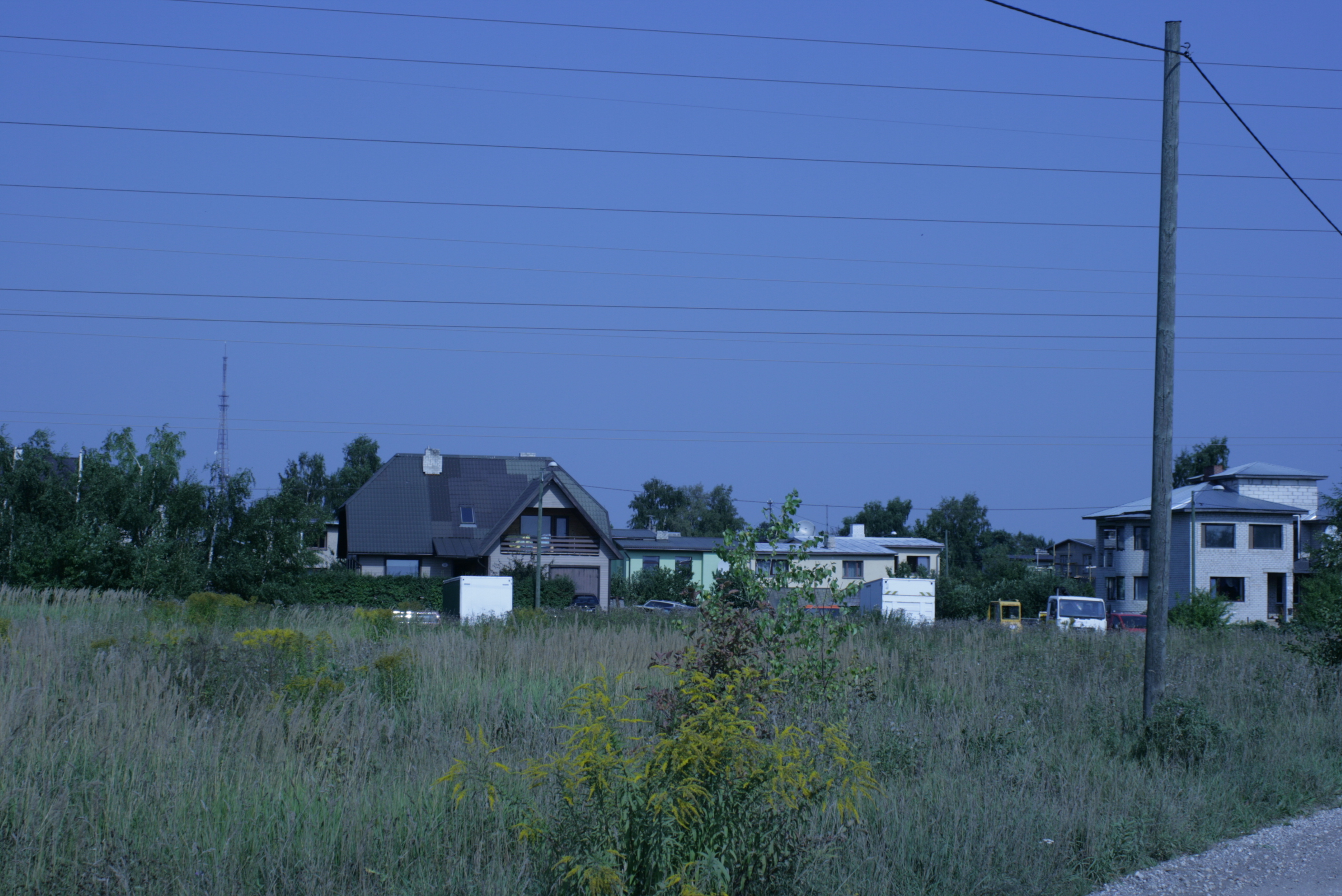

- Location in Estonia
- Coordinates: 58°20′34″N 26°41′59″E
- Country: Estonia
- County: Tartu County
- Municipality: Kambja Parish

Population (01.09.2010)
  - Total: 557

Soinaste is a village in Kambja Parish, Tartu County, Estonia. It has a population of 557 (as determined in the census of September 1, 2010).
