= Külitse =

Borough in Estonia

- Small borough
- Location in Estonia
- Coordinates: 58°19′00″N 26°36′47″E
- Country: Estonia
- County: Tartu
- Parish: Kambja
- First mentioned: 1582

Population (01.09.2010)
  - Total: 600

Külitse is a small borough in Kambja Parish, Tartu County, in southern Estonia. It is located about 6 km southwest of the city of Tartu by the Tartu–Valga–Riga railway and the European route E264 (also known as Via Hanseatica). Külitse has a population of 600 (as of 1 September 2010).

Külitse was first mentioned in 1582 as Kilicz.

In the beginning of the 1970s, a reservoir known as Ropka Lake was created in the village.

Külitse is served by Edelaraudtee's Ropka station which is located on the border of Külitse and Laane villages.
