= Pangodi =

Village in Estonia

Coordinates: 58°12′N 26°35′E

- Village
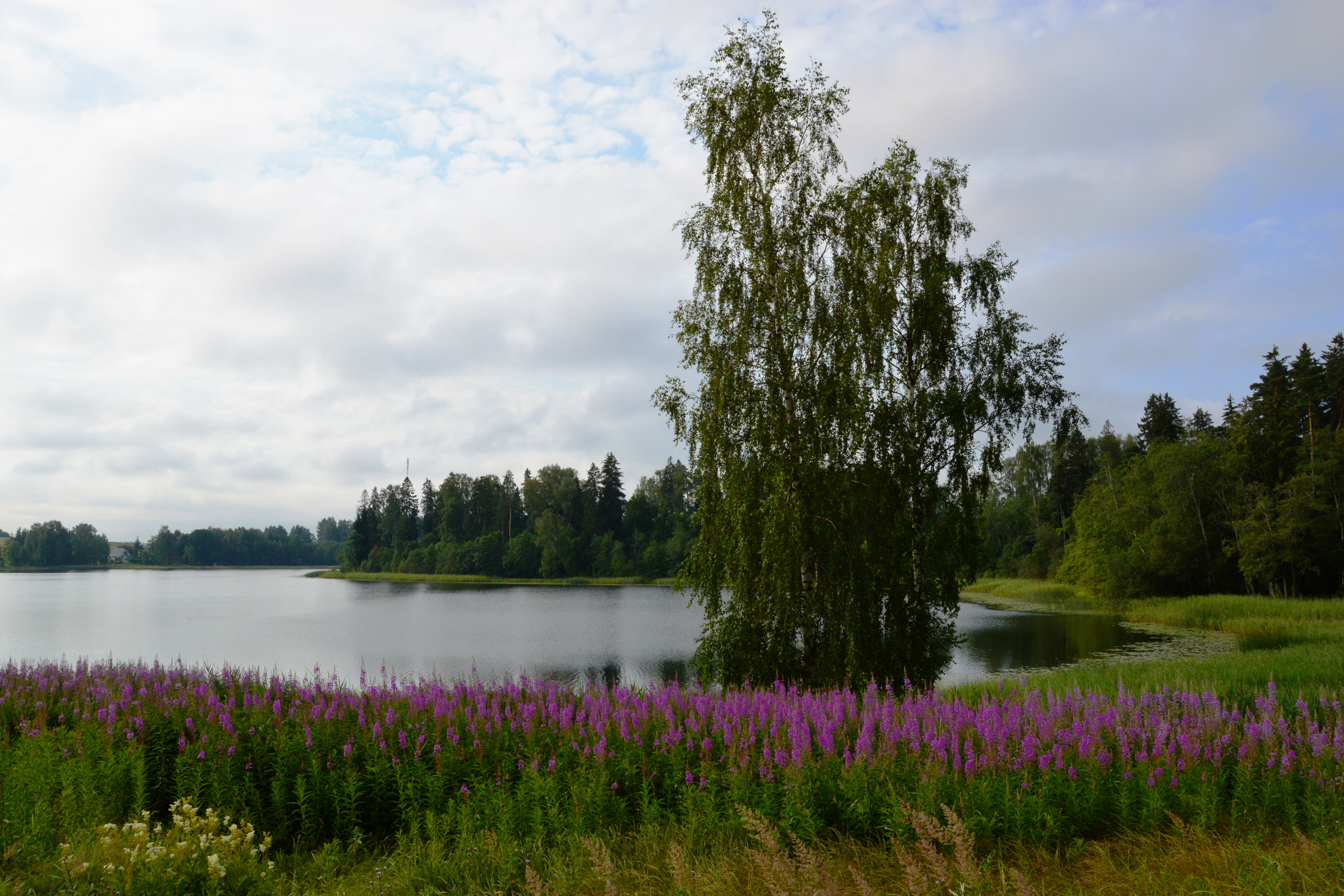
- Lake Pangodi
- Interactive map of Pangodi
- Country: Estonia
- County: Tartu County
- Parish: Kambja Parish

Population (2021)
  - Total: 103
- Time zone: UTC+2 (EET)
  - Summer (DST): UTC+3 (EEST)

Pangodi is a village in Kambja Parish, Tartu County in eastern Estonia.

Pangodi is the birthplace of the weightlifter Leonhard Kukk.

As of 2021, the village had 103 residents.
