= List of boroughs in Estonia =

This article is part of the
Subdivisions of Estonia series
Counties
Governors
Municipalities
List
- by population
- by area
- by density
- by wealth
Populated places
- Cities and towns
- Boroughs
- Small boroughs
- Villages
NUTS:EE
ISO 3166-2:EE

The following is a list of boroughs (Estonian: alevid) and small boroughs (Estonian: alevikud) in Estonia.

== Boroughs ==
- Aegviidu
- Järva-Jaani
- Järvakandi
- Kiili
- Kohila
- Kohtla-Nõmme
- Lavassaare
- Märjamaa
- Paikuse
- Pärnu-Jaagupi
- Raadi
- Tootsi
- Vändra

== Small boroughs ==
=== A ===
Adavere - Aespa - Ahja - Äksi - Alatskivi - Alu - Ämari - Ambla - Aravete - Ardu - Are - Aruküla - Aseri - Assaku - Aste - Audru - Avinurme

=== E ===
Eidapere - Erra

=== H ===
Haabneeme - Häädemeeste - Habaja - Hageri - Hagudi - Haljala - Halliste - Harku - Helme - Hulja - Hummuli

=== I ===
Iisaku - Ilmatsalu

=== J ===
Juuru - Jõgeva - Jüri

=== K ===
Käärdi - Kadrina - Kaerepere - Käina - Kaiu - Kamari - Kambja - Kanepi - Kangru - Käravete - Karjaküla - Kärla - Käru - Kasepää - Keava - Kehtna - Keila-Joa - Kihelkonna - Kiisa - Kiiu - Kiltsi - Klooga - Kobela - Koeru - Kolga - Kolga-Jaani - Kolkja - Kõpu - Kõrgessaare - Kõrveküla - Kose (Harju County) - Kose (Võru County) - Kose-Uuemõisa - Kostivere - Kudjape - Külitse - Kureküla - Kuremaa - Kuusalu - Kuusiku

=== L ===
Laagri - Laatre - Laekvere - Lagedi - Lähte - Laiuse - Lehtse - Leisi - Lelle - Lepna - Lohusuu - Loo - Lüganuse - Luige - Luunja

=== M ===
Mäetaguse - Märja - Mehikoorma - Misso - Mooste - Mustla

=== N ===
Näpi - Nasva - Nõo

=== O ===
Oisu - Õisu - Olgina - Olustvere - Orissaare - Õru

=== P ===
Pajusti - Palamuse - Palivere - Paralepa - Parksepa - Peetri (Harju County) - Peetri (Järva County) - Prillimäe - Puhja - Puka - Puurmani

=== R ===
Raasiku - Rakke - Ramsi - Räni - Rannu - Ravila - Riisipere - Risti - Roela - Roiu - Rõngu - Roosna-Alliku - Rõuge - Rummu

=== S ===
Sadala - Saku - Salme - Sangaste - Särevere - Sauga - Siimusti - Simuna - Sinimäe - Sõmerpalu - Sõmeru - Sonda

=== T ===
Tabasalu - Tabivere - Taebla - Tammiku - Tihemetsa - Toila - Tõravere - Tori - Torma - Tõrvandi - Tõstamaa - Tsirguliina - Tudu - Turba

=== U ===
Uhtna - Ülenurme - Ulila - Uuemõisa

=== V ===
Väätsa - Vahi - Vaida - Väike-Maarja - Väimela - Valjala - Vana-Antsla - Varnja - Värska - Varstu - Vasalemma - Vastse-Kuuste - Vastseliina - Vasula - Veriora - Viimsi - Viiratsi - Vinni - Virtsu - Viru-Jaagupi - Viru-Nigula - Võiste - Voka - Võnnu - Võõpsu - Võsu

== See also ==
- Populated places in Estonia
- List of cities and towns in Estonia
- List of villages in Estonia
- Municipalities of Estonia
