= List of municipalities of Estonia by population =

This article is part of the
Subdivisions of Estonia series
Counties
Governors
Municipalities
List
- by population
- by area
- by density
- by wealth
Populated places
- Cities and towns
- Boroughs
- Small boroughs
- Villages
NUTS:EE
ISO 3166-2:EE

This is a listing of the municipalities of Estonia.

It indicates the Populations of 2005, 2010, the Land Area and Density of 2010.

#	Municipality	Population (2005)	Population (2010)	Land Area (2010)	Density (2010)
1	Tallinn	396,010	411,980	158.27	2,523.157
2	Tartu	101,483	103,284	38.8	2,661.959
3	Narva	67,144	65,881	84.54	779.288
4	Kohtla-Järve	46,032	44,492	41.77	1,065.166
5	Pärnu	44,396	44,083	32.22	1,368.187
6	Viljandi	20,354	19,963	14.62	1365.458
7	Rakvere	16,786	16,580	10.64	1,558.271
8	Maardu	16,601	16,529	22.76	726.23
9	Sillamäe	16,678	16,183	10.54	1,535.389
10	Kuressaare	14,897	14,977	14.95	1,001.806
11	Võru	14,609	14,376	13.24	1,085.801
12	Valga	13,980	13,692	16.54	827.811
13	Jõhvi Parish	1,721	12,788	124.06	103.079
14	Haapsalu	11,809	11,618	10.59	1,097.073
15	Türi Parish	2,883	11,098	598.81	18.533
16	Paide	9,744	9,761	10.03	973.18
17	Rapla Parish	9,542	9,449	243.37	38.826
18	Keila	9,401	9,430	10.46	901.53
19	Viimsi Parish	8,293	9,070	72.84	124.519
20	Tapa Parish	–	8,809	264.33	33.326
21	Rae Parish	8,061	8,486	206.73	41.049
22	Saue Parish	7,369	7,624	196.12	38.874
23	Saku Parish	7,388	7,559	171.13	44.171
24	Märjamaa Parish	7,433	7,290	871.62	8.364
25	Harku Parish	6,726	7,278	159.77	45.553
26	Kiviõli	6,992	6,606	11.75	562.213
27	Põlva	6,506	6,554	5.47	1,198.172
28	Kuusalu Parish	4,626	6,371	707.93	8.999
29	Jõgeva	6,368	6,322	3.86	1,637.824
30	Anija Parish	6,276	6,199	520.94	11.9
31	Suure-Jaani Parish	2,263	6,166	742.83	8.301
32	Kohila Parish	5,884	5,960	230.2	25.891
33	Elva	5,857	5,762	9.92	580.847
34	Kose Parish	5,729	5,722	237.33	24.11
35	Vinni Parish	5,625	5,613	486.65	11.534
36	Räpina Parish	5,670	5,502	265.93	20.69
37	Väike-Maarja Parish	4,506	5,393	457.39	11.791
38	Kadrina Parish	5,134	5,371	354.81	15.138
39	Jõelähtme Parish	5,199	5,279	210.86	25.036
40	Saue	5,035	5,241	3.49	1,501.719
41	Jõgeva Parish	5,340	5,223	458.8	11.384
42	Kehtna Parish	5,181	5,116	507.3	10.085
43	Saarde Parish	2,334	5,089	706.98	7.198
44	Tartu Parish	5,040	5,025	300.26	16.735
45	Vasalemma Parish	5,058	5,005	38.66	129.462
46	Audru Parish	4,869	4,850	378.84	12.802
47	Ülenurme Parish	4,753	4,811	86.35	55.715
48	Võru Parish	4,807	4,752	202.23	23.498
49	Põltsamaa	4,738	4,642	5.99	774.958
50	Tamsalu Parish	2,055	4,537	214.61	21.141
51	Põltsamaa Parish	4,567	4,441	416.87	10.653
52	Raasiku Parish	4,355	4,358	158.86	27.433
53	Tarvastu Parish	4,290	4,202	409	10.274
54	Antsla Parish	4,307	4,170	270.79	15.399
55	Paldiski	4,207	4,125	60.17	68.556
56	Otepää Parish	4,123	4,041	217.36	18.591
57	Karksi Parish	4,100	4,022	321.45	12.512
58	Sindi	4,064	3,979	5.01	794.212
59	Kaarma Parish	3,896	3,914	391.47	9.998
60	Sõmeru Parish	3,896	3,910	168.29	23.234
61	Põlva Parish	3,947	3,883	228.63	16.984
62	Pärsti Parish	3,882	3,833	210.62	18.199
63	Keila Parish	3,821	3,831	178.97	21.406
64	Viiratsi Parish	3,760	3,729	215.02	17.343
65	Kunda	3,771	3,669	10.01	366.533
66	Kärdla	3,724	3,634	4.5	807.556
67	Nõo Parish	3,647	3,599	168.92	21.306
68	Halinga Parish	3,492	3,415	365.45	9.345
69	Loksa	3,474	3,403	3.81	893.176
70	Nissi Parish	3,295	3,225	264.92	12.173
71	Tõrva	3,124	3,099	4.8	645.625
72	Vändra Parish	2,568	3,097	642.22	4.822
73	Paikuse Parish	3,010	3,080	174.92	17.608
74	Häädemeeste Parish	3,133	3,056	390.34	7.829
75	Ridala Parish	3,047	3,040	253.56	11.989
76	Tähtvere Parish	2,945	2,958	114.79	25.769
77	Taebla Parish	2,930	2,911	141.46	20.578
78	Haljala Parish	2,849	2,873	183.02	15.698
79	Rõngu Parish	2,943	2,869	164.19	17.474
80	Abja Parish	2,792	2,689	290.21	9.266
81	Lihula Parish	2,776	2,652	367.31	7.22
82	Sauga Parish	2,556	2,614	164.75	15.866
83	Luunja Parish	2,569	2,603	131.54	19.789
84	Narva-Jõesuu	2,778	2,602	11.03	235.902
85	Kiili Parish	2,391	2,598	100.37	25.884
86	Tori Parish	2,547	2,538	282.07	8.998
87	Helme Parish	2,540	2,522	312.73	8.064
88	Kanepi Parish	2,579	2,506	231.43	10.828
89	Palamuse Parish	2,512	2,496	215.88	11.562
90	Vändra	2,547	2,492	3.28	759.756
91	Tabivere Parish	2,478	2,454	200.4	12.246
92	Kambja Parish	2,451	2,441	189.22	12.9
93	Koeru Parish	2,394	2,315	236.82	9.775
94	Rakvere Parish	2,288	2,297	127.69	17.989
95	Toila Parish	2,324	2,292	159.66	14.356
96	Ambla Parish	2,332	2,284	166.45	13.722
97	Puhja Parish	2,336	2,283	167.54	13.627
98	Torma Parish	2,318	2,234	349.26	6.396
99	Käina Parish	2,190	2,145	186.32	11.512
100	Aseri Parish	2,238	2,119	67.14	31.561
101	Leisi Parish	2,139	2,066	348.4	5.93
102	Vastseliina Parish	2,152	2,065	222.78	9.269
103	Tahkuranna Parish	2,014	2,016	103.36	19.505
104	Orissaare Parish	2,058	2,012	163.02	12.342
105	Rõuge Parish	2,069	2,003	263.72	7.595
106	Vara Parish	1,950	1,938	333.81	5.806
107	Vihula Parish	2,026	1,925	364.28	5.284
108	Sõmerpalu Parish	1,929	1,862	181.93	10.235
109	Rakke Parish	1,953	1,852	225.87	8.199
110	Puurmani Parish	1,889	1,845	292.56	6.306
111	Puka Parish	1,894	1,835	200.93	9.133
112	Laekvere Parish	1,851	1,812	352.42	5.142
113	Püssi	1,838	1,802	2.1	858.095
114	Halliste Parish	1,839	1,797	267.09	6.728
115	Paide Parish	1,792	1,795	300.4	5.975
116	Tõlliste Parish	1,889	1,785	193.78	9.211
117	Järva-Jaani Parish	1,796	1,760	126.82	13.878
118	Lasva Parish	1,778	1,760	172.18	10.222
119	Vigala Parish	1,790	1,734	269.81	6.427
120	Padise Parish	1,759	1,722	366.55	4.698
121	Raikküla Parish	1,759	1,720	224.2	7.672
122	Haaslava Parish	1,684	1,704	110.02	15.488
123	Mäksa Parish	1,720	1,703	133.47	12.759
124	Pühalepa Parish	1,725	1,699	255.45	6.651
125	Muhu Parish	1,803	1,697	206.12	8.233
126	Kaiu Parish	1,682	1,696	261.06	6.497
127	Kernu Parish	1,663	1,665	174.7	9.531
128	Rannu Parish	1,706	1,654	158.01	10.468
129	Kolga-Jaani Parish	1,743	1,651	312.35	5.286
130	Hanila Parish	1,698	1,642	231.88	7.081
131	Paistu Parish	1,613	1,608	128.59	12.505
132	Mustvee	1,662	1,592	5.45	292.11
133	Kõue Parish	1,629	1,589	295.51	5.377
134	Kärla Parish	1,696	1,580	216.28	7.305
135	Valgjärve Parish	1,592	1,572	143.02	10.991
136	Juuru Parish	1,584	1,566	152.4	10.276
137	Tõstamaa Parish	1,605	1,557	261.01	5.965
138	Vaivara Parish	1,583	1,551	397.97	3.897
139	Mooste Parish	1,588	1,529	185.12	8.26
140	Mäetaguse Parish	1,556	1,519	285.04	5.329
141	Veriora Parish	1,636	1,509	200.42	7.529
142	Kohtla Parish	1,496	1,497	101.56	14.74
143	Võhma	1,555	1,493	1.93	773.575
144	Avinurme Parish	1,547	1,487	193.62	7.68
145	Väätsa Parish	1,485	1,487	195.33	7.613
146	Sangaste Parish	1,494	1,464	144.72	10.116
147	Pajusi Parish	1,497	1,457	232.47	6.267
148	Järvakandi	1,464	1,403	4.83	290.476
149	Albu Parish	1,401	1,401	257.19	5.447
150	Urvaste Parish	1,447	1,395	139.62	9.991
151	Iisaku Parish	1,433	1,380	257.62	5.357
152	Pihtla Parish	1,417	1,376	228.11	6.032
153	Viru-Nigula Parish	1,394	1,374	234.05	5.871
154	Saare Parish	1,402	1,367	224.71	6.083
155	Valjala Parish	1,407	1,361	180.02	7.56
156	Kullamaa Parish	1,409	1,349	224.53	6.008
157	Laheda Parish	1,388	1,341	91.47	14.661
158	Konguta Parish	1,363	1,330	107.6	12.361
159	Alatskivi Parish	1,396	1,328	128.38	10.344
160	Are Parish	1,339	1,327	159.58	8.316
161	Värska Parish	1,418	1,325	187.82	7.055
162	Pala Parish	1,352	1,302	156.71	8.308
163	Kasepää Parish	1,350	1,296	40.87	31.71
164	Koonga Parish	1,331	1,289	438.51	2.939
165	Kõrgessaare Parish	1,331	1,284	379.5	3.383
166	Saarepeedi Parish	1,308	1,279	98.34	13.006
167	Emmaste Parish	1,276	1,270	197.49	6.431
168	Varstu Parish	1,306	1,268	170.63	7.431
169	Vastse-Kuuste Parish	1,265	1,253	123.01	10.186
170	Roosna-Alliku Parish	1,250	1,220	132.11	9.235
171	Kõo Parish	1,217	1,202	149.46	8.042
172	Võnnu Parish	1,235	1,184	232.63	5.09
173	Salme Parish	1,194	1,168	115.07	10.15
174	Haanja Parish	1,208	1,146	170.47	6.723
175	Palupera Parish	1,174	1,139	123.48	9.224
176	Meremäe Parish	1,203	1,117	131.97	8.464
177	Kallaste	1,166	1,115	1.93	577.72
178	Koigi Parish	1,122	1,114	204.45	5.449
179	Ahja Parish	1,156	1,105	72.1	15.326
180	Hummuli Parish	1,060	1,055	162.7	6.484
181	Karula Parish	1,117	1,053	229.92	4.58
182	Lüganuse Parish	1,133	1,047	104.57	10.012
183	Kohtla-Nõmme	1,093	1,032	4.64	222.414
184	Imavere Parish	1,031	1,020	139.59	7.307
185	Mõisaküla	1,091	1,013	2.2	460.455
186	Surju Parish	1,022	1,012	357.69	2.829
187	Mõniste Parish	1,036	1,007	176.53	5.704
188	Kõlleste Parish	1,053	996	150.42	6.621
189	Rägavere Parish	1,001	981	173.74	5.646
190	Martna Parish	1,016	973	269.42	3.611
191	Mikitamäe Parish	1,069	973	104.41	9.319
192	Varbla Parish	1,021	973	313.81	3.101
193	Sonda Parish	1,036	966	148.08	6.524
194	Illuka Parish	1,034	958	543.82	1.762
195	Tootsi	998	937	1.76	532.386
196	Pöide Parish	966	932	123.58	7.542
197	Taheva Parish	981	925	204.7	4.519
198	Oru Parish	954	923	197.65	4.67
199	Põdrala Parish	918	892	127.22	7.011
200	Laeva Parish	878	880	233.18	3.774
201	Aegviidu	916	856	11.97	71.512
202	Kihelkonna Parish	902	844	245.94	3.432
203	Orava Parish	885	841	175.52	4.791
204	Risti Parish	895	838	167.84	4.993
205	Peipsiääre Parish	914	831	30.95	26.85
206	Kareda Parish	827	803	91.58	8.768
207	Kõpu Parish	825	800	258.78	3.091
208	Lümanda Parish	830	797	199.49	3.995
209	Lohusuu Parish	825	785	103.28	7.601
210	Misso Parish	826	772	189.35	4.077
211	Laimjala Parish	797	770	116.29	6.621
212	Maidla Parish	765	755	332.3	2.272
213	Mustjala Parish	762	732	235.47	3.109
214	Noarootsi Parish	738	721	296.36	2.433
215	Meeksi Parish	760	699	143.48	4.872
216	Käru Parish	713	686	214.91	3.192
217	Tudulinna Parish	638	605	269.38	2.246
218	Õru Parish	573	546	104.63	5.218
219	Lavassaare	543	535	8	66.875
220	Kihnu Parish	491	489	16.88	28.969
221	Nõva Parish	477	454	129.61	3.503
222	Torgu Parish	377	346	126.44	2.736
223	Alajõe Parish	360	309	109.61	2.819
224	Vormsi Parish	241	245	92.93	2.636
225	Piirissaare Parish	90	73	7.76	9.407
226	Ruhnu Parish	67	72	11.54	6.239
#	Loksa Parish	1756	–	–	–
#	Jõhvi	11533	–	–	–
#	Türi	6147	–	–	–
#	Kabala Parish	1022	–	–	–
#	Lehtse Parish	1594	–	–	–
#	Oisu Parish	1321	–	–	–
#	Tamsalu	2586	–	–	–
#	Tapa	6585	–	–	–
#	Saksi Parish	1176	–	–	–
#	Kilingi-Nõmme	2159	–	–	–
#	Kaisma Parish	569	–	–	–
#	Tali Parish	735	–	–	–
#	Suure-Jaani	1252	–	–	–
#	Olustvere Parish	1602	–	–	–
#	Vastemõisa Parish	1130	–	–	–

The land area is expressed in km^{2}, and the density is expressed in inhabitants per km^{2} of land area.

== See also ==
- List of the most populated municipalities in the Nordic countries
