= List of municipalities of Estonia by area =

This article is part of the
Subdivisions of Estonia series
Counties
Governors
Municipalities
List
- by population
- by area
- by density
- by wealth
Populated places
- Cities and towns
- Boroughs
- Small boroughs
- Villages
NUTS:EE
ISO 3166-2:EE

This is a listing of the municipalities of Estonia by the land area as of 2026.

Rank	Municipality	Population	Area (km²)	Density (inhabitants per km²)
1	Saaremaa Parish	29,869	2,718.52	11.0
2	Alutaguse Parish	3,909	1,458.87	2.7
3	Lääne-Nigula Parish	6,907	1,448.48	4.8
4	Viljandi Parish	13,295	1,371.63	9.7
5	Lääneranna Parish	4,951	1,362.68	3.6
6	Järva Parish	8,751	1,222.80	7.2
7	Märjamaa Parish	7,188	1,162.72	6.2
8	Põhja-Sakala Parish	7,407	1,153.00	6.4
9	Saarde Parish	4,192	1,064.80	3.9
10	Jõgeva Parish	12,641	1,039.66	12.2
11	Hiiumaa Parish	8,330	1,032.57	8.1
12	Vinni Parish	6,689	1,012.90	6.6
13	Põhja-Pärnumaa Parish	7,877	1,010.82	7.8
14	Türi Parish	10,402	1,008.40	10.3
15	Võru Parish	10,204	952.30	10.7
16	Rõuge Parish	4,560	933.20	4.9
17	Põltsamaa Parish	9,173	889.55	10.3
18	Mulgi Parish	6,896	880.72	7.8
19	Rapla Parish	13,373	859.45	15.6
20	Pärnu	52,198	857.64	60.9
21	Valga Parish	15,173	745.25	20.4
22	Tartu Parish	13,671	741.83	18.4
23	Elva Parish	14,624	732.03	20.0
24	Kuusalu Parish	6,463	709.40	9.1
25	Põlva Parish	13,049	705.91	18.5
26	Väike-Maarja Parish	5,573	682.45	8.2
27	Peipsiääre Parish	4,935	652.19	7.6
28	Tõrva Parish	5,736	647.17	8.9
29	Lääne-Harju Parish	13,754	646.01	21.3
30	Saue Parish	26,170	628.44	41.6
31	Mustvee Parish	4,712	615.73	7.7
32	Tori Parish	12,574	610.90	20.6
33	Lüganuse Parish	8,008	598.58	13.4
34	Räpina Parish	5,745	592.42	9.7
35	Haljala Parish	3,909	548.62	7.1
36	Anija Parish	6,365	532.99	11.9
37	Kose Parish	7,891	532.79	14.8
38	Kanepi Parish	4,429	524.66	8.4
39	Otepää Parish	6,125	520.22	11.8
40	Kehtna Parish	5,328	511.95	10.4
41	Häädemeeste Parish	4,733	494.76	9.6
42	Kastre Parish	6,380	492.73	12.9
43	Tapa Parish	10,787	479.68	22.5
44	Setomaa Parish	2,655	463.05	5.7
45	Paide	10,420	442.89	23.5
46	Antsla Parish	3,959	414.93	9.5
47	Narva-Jõesuu	4,219	404.25	10.4
48	Jõhvi Parish	16,052	389.69	41.2
49	Kadrina Parish	4,629	353.90	13.1
50	Viru-Nigula Parish	5,533	312.26	17.7
51	Rakvere Parish	5,844	294.67	19.8
52	Kambja Parish	14,824	275.16	53.9
53	Haapsalu	13,033	271.07	48.1
54	Kohila Parish	7,844	230.12	34.1
55	Jõelähtme Parish	8,007	211.41	37.9
56	Muhu Parish	1,561	207.89	7.5
57	Rae Parish	25,835	206.78	124.9
58	Saku Parish	12,155	169.95	71.5
59	Nõo Parish	4,442	169.09	26.3
60	Tallinn	452,563	159.41	2,839.0
61	Harku Parish	19,128	159.03	120.3
62	Raasiku Parish	5,392	158.95	33.9
63	Tartu	99,900	154.03	648.6
64	Luunja Parish	6,049	131.75	45.9
65	Kiili Parish	7,360	100.87	73.0
66	Vormsi Parish	260	95.06	2.7
67	Viimsi Parish	23,418	73.35	319.3
68	Narva	51,411	68.68	748.6
69	Kohtla-Järve	32,368	39.35	822.6
70	Maardu	16,812	23.44	717.2
71	Kihnu Parish	490	17.25	28.4
72	Viljandi	17,000	14.67	1,158.8
73	Võru	11,813	14.03	842.0
74	Sillamäe	11,942	12.35	967.0
75	Ruhnu Parish	91	11.91	7.6
76	Keila	10,986	11.22	979.1
77	Rakvere	15,345	10.75	1,427.4
78	Loksa	2,459	3.81	645.4
