= List of villages in Estonia =

This article is part of the
Subdivisions of Estonia series
Counties
Governors
Municipalities
List
- by population
- by area
- by density
- by wealth
Populated places
- Cities and towns
- Boroughs
- Small boroughs
- Villages
NUTS:EE
ISO 3166-2:EE

This is the list of villages in Estonia. The list is incomplete.

== Existing villages ==
Former villages in Estonia
Villages in Harju County
Villages in Hiiu County
Villages in Ida-Viru County
Villages in Järva County
Villages in Jõgeva County
Villages in Lääne County
Villages in Lääne-Viru County
Villages in Pärnu County
Villages in Põlva County
Villages in Rapla County
Villages in Saare County
Villages in Tartu County
Villages in Valga County
Villages in Viljandi County
Villages in Võru County
List of villages in Estonia

For alphabetical list, see Estonian Wikipedia et:Eesti külade loend

== Former villages ==
In English Wikipedia, there are no articles of former villages in Estonia. Former villages which are more known are redirected to existing ones (eg Pullapää).

For the list of former villages, see Estonian Wikipedia et:Eesti külade loend#Endised külad

== Estonian villages outside Estonia ==
There are also many existing and former villages which are located outside nowadays Estonia border, in Estonian usually it is said "Välis-Eesti külad" or "väliseesti külad"". For the extensive list, see et:Väliseesti külade loend.

- Yuzhnaya Liflyandiya (Estonian: Lõuna-Liiviküla), Russia, Primorsky Krai
- Verkhnaia Bulanka (Estonian: Ülem-Bulanka), Russia, Krasnoyarsk Krai
- Verkhnii Suetuk (Estonian: Ülem-Suetuk), Russia, Krasnoyarsk Krai

== See also ==
- Populated places in Estonia
- List of cities and towns in Estonia
- List of boroughs in Estonia
- Municipalities of Estonia

== Literature ==
- Jüri Meomuttel: Eesti asunikud laialises Wene riigis (PDF and DjVu). Esimene katse sõnumid kõikide Eesti asunduste üle tuua, Tartu, Postimees, 1900.
- August Nigol: Eesti asundused ja asupaigad Wenemaal, Tartu: Eesti Kirjastuse-Ühisuse "Postimees" print, 1918
- August Nigol: Eesti asundused ja asupaigad Wenemaal (PDF and DjVu), Tartu, Eesti Kirjanduse Seltsi Kodumaa Tundmaõppimise Toimekonna toimetised nr. 1, 1918
- Гаупт В. Колония ссыльных лютеранского исповедания в Шушенской волости Минусинского округа // Русское географическое общество. Записки Сибирского отдела. Иркутск, 1864. № 7. C. 16–31;
- Гаупт В. Состояние колоний ссыльных лютеранского исповедания в Шушенской волости Минусинского округа. 1850–1865 гг. // Вторая памятная книга Енисейской губернии на 1865 и 1866 гг. СПб., 1865. С. 58–78.
- Ядринцев Н.М. Рига, Ревель, Нарва и Гельсингфорс в Сибири // Неделя. 1878. № 3.
- Eesti asunduskülade kirjeldus tegevuse kohta; 5 October 1917; Saaga ERA.3372.1.7:1
