= Lake Kanariku =

Lake in Estonia

- Kanariku järv (Estonian)
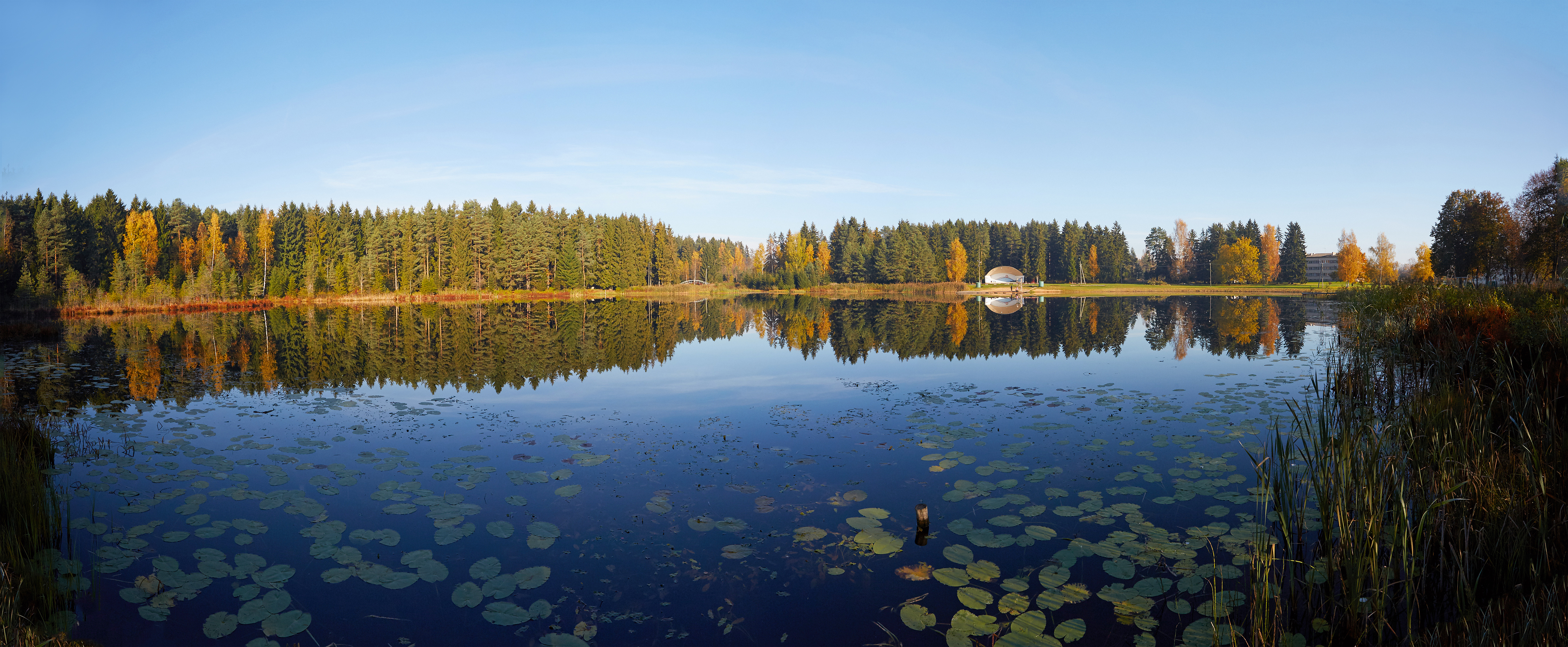

- Location within Estonia
- Coordinates: 57°54′35″N 26°58′56″E
- Primary inflows: Kanariku Creek
- Basin countries: Estonia
- Max. length: 240 meters (790 ft)
- Surface area: 2.7 hectares (6.7 acres)
- Shore length^{1}: 780 meters (2,560 ft)
- Surface elevation: 80.8 meters (265 ft)
- ^{1} Shore length is not a well-defined measure.

Lake Kanariku (Estonian: Kanariku järv, also Kanariku Verijärv, Parksepa järv) is a lake in Estonia. It is not open for public use.

== Names ==
According to the linguist Evar Saar, the lake bore three names. The name Verijärv literally means 'Blood Lake'; however, based on study of another lake with the same name and the village of Verijärve, it is unlikely that the lake is named after blood. Fieldwork determined that older people preferred the name Kanariku järv 'Lake Kanariku' (referring to the village bordering the lake to the north) and younger people Parksepa järv 'Lake Parksepa' (referring to the village the lake is actually located in). Based on this, the Place Names Council decided to adopt the name Kanariku järv 'Lake Kanariku' as the standardized name for the lake.

== Physical description ==
The lake covers an area of 2.7 hectares (6.7 acres), with a length of 240 meters (790 ft) and a shoreline measuring 780 meters (2,560 ft). It is fed by Kanariku Creek (Estonian: Kanariku oja).

== See also ==
- List of lakes of Estonia
