= Veeriku =

Neighbourhood of Tartu, Estonia

Coordinates: 58°22′29.54″N 26°41′17.34″E

- Neighbourhood of Tartu
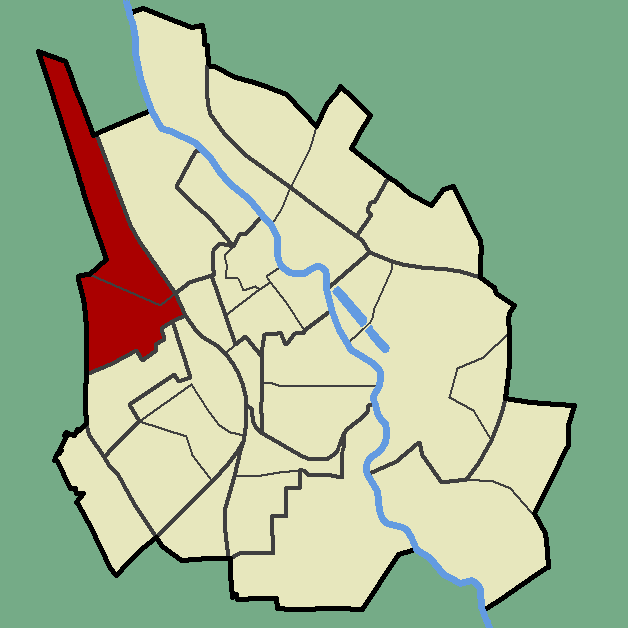
- Location of Veeriku in Tartu.
- Country: Estonia
- County: Tartu County
- City: Tartu

Area
  - Total: 2.81 km^{2} (1.08 sq mi)

Population (31.12.2013)
  - Total: 5,502
  - Density: 1,960/km^{2} (5,070/sq mi)

Veeriku is a neighbourhood of Tartu located about 2 km west of the city centre, just beyond the railway that bisects the city. Veeriku has a population of 5,502 (as of 31 December 2013) and an area of 2.81 km^{2} (1.08 mi^{2}).
