= Jaamamõisa =

Neighbourhood of Tartu

Coordinates: 58°23′0.45″N 26°45′19.98″E

- Neighbourhood of Tartu
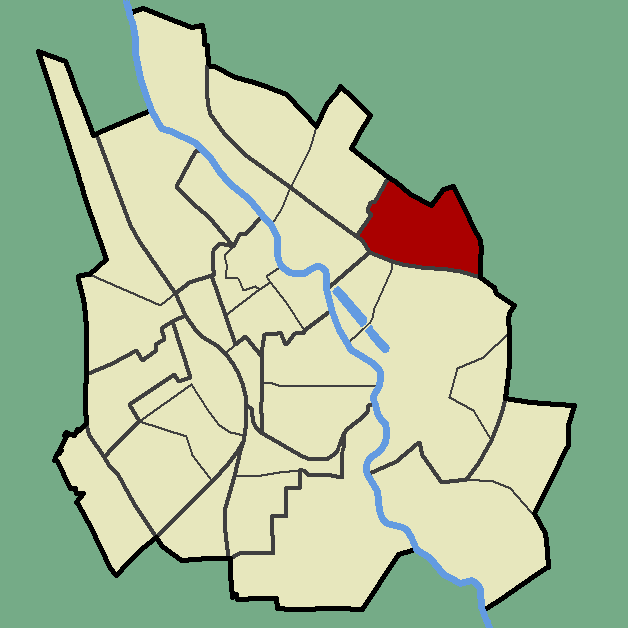
- Location of Jaamamõisa in Tartu.
- Country: Estonia
- County: Tartu County
- City: Tartu

Area
  - Total: 1.50 km^{2} (0.58 sq mi)

Population (31.12.2013)
  - Total: 3,261
  - Density: 2,170/km^{2} (5,630/sq mi)

Jaamamõisa (Estonian for "Station Manor") is a neighbourhood of Tartu, Estonia. It has a population of 3,261 (as of 31 December 2013) and an area of 1.50 km^{2} (0.58 mi^{2}).
