= Verijärv =

Lake in Estonia

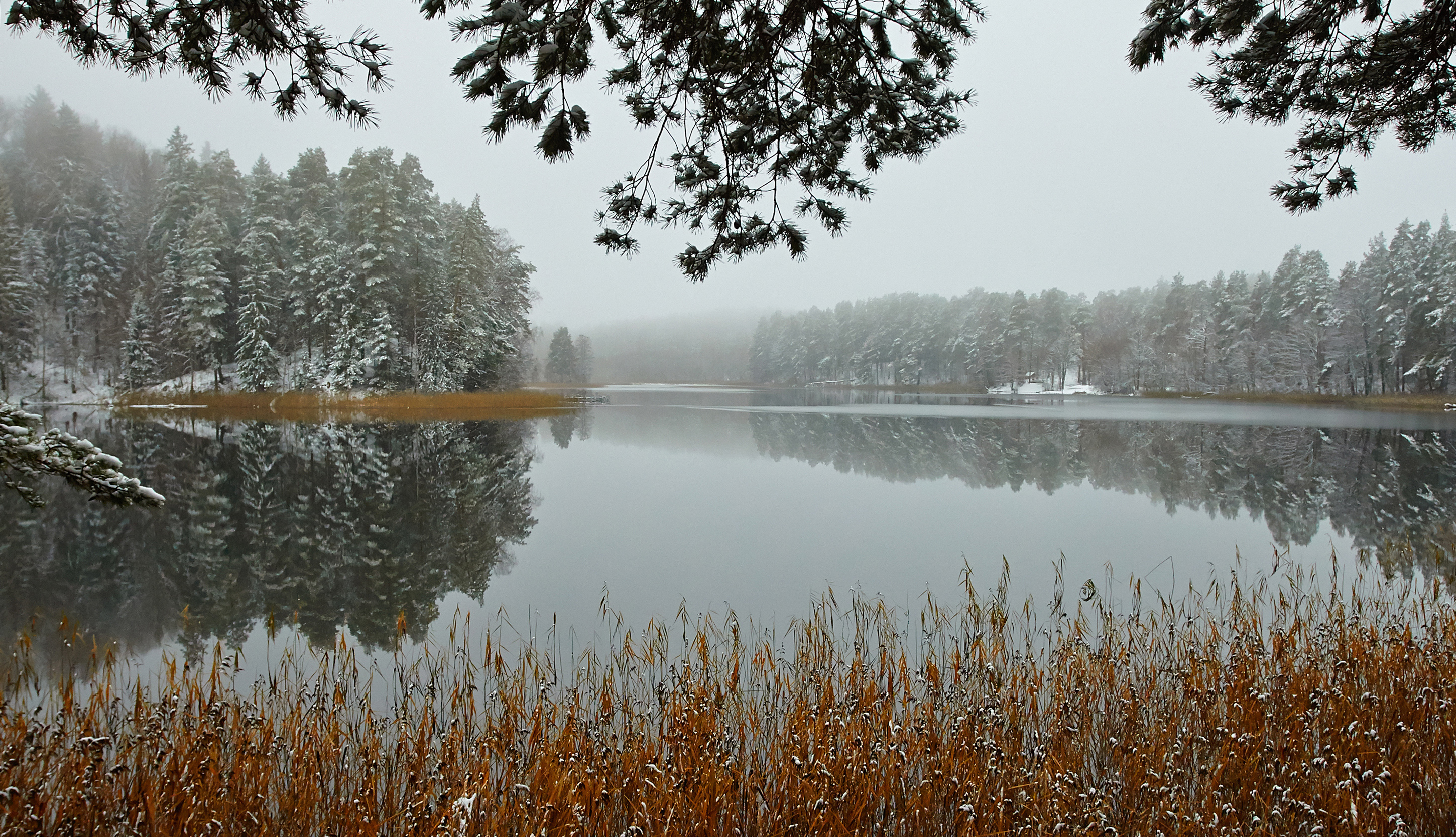

- Location within Estonia
- Coordinates: 57°48′32″N 27°03′26″E
- Primary outflows: Koreli Creek
- Basin countries: Estonia
- Max. length: 1,290 meters (4,230 ft)
- Surface area: 25.4 hectares (63 acres)
- Average depth: 6.2 meters (20 ft)
- Max. depth: 19.4 meters (64 ft)
- Water volume: 1,592,000 cubic meters (56,200,000 cu ft)
- Shore length^{1}: 3,640 meters (11,940 ft)
- Surface elevation: 90.2 meters (296 ft)
- ^{1} Shore length is not a well-defined measure.

Verijärv (also known as Kasaritsa Verijärv) is a lake in Estonia. It is located in the village of Verijärve in Võru Parish, Võru County, just outside the city of Võru. The lake is part of the Verijärv Landscape Conservation Area (Verijärve maastikukaitseala).

== Physical description ==
The lake has an area of 25.4 hectares (63 acres). The lake has an average depth of 6.2 meters (20 ft) and a maximum depth of 19.4 meters (64 ft). It is 1,290 meters (4,230 ft) long, and its shoreline measures 3,640 meters (11,940 ft). It has a volume of 1,592,000 cubic meters (56,200,000 cu ft).

== See also ==
- List of lakes of Estonia
