= List of cities and towns in Estonia =

This article is part of the
Subdivisions of Estonia series
Counties
Governors
Municipalities
List
- by population
- by area
- by density
- by wealth
Populated places
- Cities and towns
- Boroughs
- Small boroughs
- Villages
NUTS:EE
ISO 3166-2:EE

The following is a list of the 47 cities and towns in Estonia. Before the Republic of Estonia became an independent nation in 1918, many of these locations were known in the rest of the world by their German names, which were occasionally quite different from the ones used in the Estonian. During the 1944–1991 Soviet occupation of Estonia, placenames were transliterated into Russian (Cyrillic alphabet) in the Soviet central government's documents, which in turn led to the use of several incorrect back-transliterations from Russian (Cyrillic) alphabet into English (and other Latin alphabets) in some English-language maps and texts during the second half of the 20th century (for example, incorrect Pyarnu, Vilyandi, Pylva, instead of the correct Pärnu, Viljandi, Põlva).

Tallinn is the capital and the most populous city of Estonia. There are 46 other linn, i.e. cities and towns in Estonia (as of 2022). The Estonian word linn means both 'city' and 'town'. More than 70% of the country's population lives in the cities and towns.

== List ==
List of cities and towns
Rank	Town	Town rights	Population 2014	Population 2024–2026	County (maakond)
1	Tallinn	1248	411,063	460,584	Harju
2	Tartu	13th c.	98,449	97,304	Tartu
3	Narva	1345	59,049	52,495	Ida-Viru
4	Pärnu (Note: The town does not constitute its own municipality, but has become part of a larger municipality (either parish (vald) or city (linn)).)	1251	40,005	41,520	Pärnu
5	Kohtla-Järve	1946	37,198	33,434	Ida-Viru
6	Viljandi	1283	17,602	17,525	Viljandi
7	Rakvere	1302	15,400	15,413	Lääne-Viru
8	Maardu	1980	17,315	15,189	Harju
9	Kuressaare	1563	13,152	13,276	Saare
10	Sillamäe	1957	14,122	12,989	Ida-Viru
11	Valga	1584	12,437	12,334	Valga
12	Võru	1784	12,571	12,022	Võru
13	Jõhvi	1938	10,525	10,398	Ida-Viru
14	Haapsalu	1279	10,316	9,838	Lääne
15	Keila	1938	9,751	9,775	Harju
16	Paide	1291	8,162	8,078	Järva
17	Elva	1938	5,657	5,648	Tartu
18	Saue	1993	5,656	5,640	Harju
19	Põlva	1993	5,661	5,458	Põlva
20	Tapa	1926	5,693	5,428	Lääne-Viru
21	Jõgeva	1938	5,457	5,143	Jõgeva
22	Rapla	1993	5,054	5,132	Rapla
23	Kiviõli	1946	5,635	5,088	Ida-Viru
24	Türi	1926	5,215	5,064	Järva
25	Põltsamaa	1926	4,148	4,050	Jõgeva
26	Sindi	1938	4,089	3,838	Pärnu
27	Paldiski	1783	4,163	3,626	Harju
28	Kärdla	1938	3,017	3,287	Hiiu
29	Kunda	1938	3,267	3,034	Lääne-Viru
30	Tõrva	1926	2,716	2,740	Valga
31	Narva-Jõesuu	1993	2,655	2,644	Ida-Viru
32	Kehra	1993	2,792	2,641	Harju
33	Loksa	1993	2,703	2,568	Harju
34	Räpina	1993	2,363	2,173	Põlva
35	Otepää	1936	1,875	2,167	Valga
36	Tamsalu	1996	2,174	2,119	Lääne-Viru
37	Kilingi-Nõmme	1938	1,707	1,671	Pärnu
38	Karksi-Nuia	1993	1,515	1,554	Viljandi
39	Antsla	1938	1,362	1,311	Võru
40	Võhma	1993	1,282	1,282	Viljandi
41	Mustvee	1938	1,348	1,269	Jõgeva
42	Lihula	1993	1,252	1,214	Lääne
43	Suure-Jaani	1938	1,036	1,064	Viljandi
44	Abja-Paluoja	1993	1,063	1,057	Viljandi
45	Püssi	1993	1,023	917	Ida-Viru
46	Mõisaküla	1938	806	748	Viljandi
47	Kallaste	1938	846	743	Tartu

== Former towns ==
- Ahtme, 1953–1960, 1993–1995, merged with Kohtla-Järve
- Jaanilinn (Ivangorod), 1617–1649, merged with Narva, annexed to the Russian SFSR in 1945
- Mustla, 1938–1979, town rights revoked
- Nõmme, 1926–1940, merged with Tallinn
- Petseri (Pechory), 1776-onwards, annexed to the Russian SFSR in 1945
- Toompea, 1248/1265/1288–1785, 1796–1878, merged with Tallinn
- Vana-Pärnu, 1251–1617, merged with Pärnu

== See also ==
- Populated places in Estonia
- Municipalities of Estonia
- Counties of Estonia
- List of villages in Estonia
