= Siimusti-Kurista Landscape Conservation Area =

Protected area in Estonia

- Location within Estonia
- Location: Estonia
- Coordinates: 58°44′25″N 26°19′10″E
- Area: 63 ha (160 acres)
- Established: 1968 (2014)

Siimusti-Kurista Landscape Conservation Area is a nature park which is located in Jõgeva County, Estonia.

The area of the nature park is 63 ha.

The protected area was founded in 1968 to protect the forest around Siimusti singing ground and Kurista Forthill (:et). In 2014, the protected area was designated to the landscape conservation area.
