= Kanariku =

Village in Estonia

- Village
- Location in Estonia
- Coordinates: 57°55′06″N 26°58′14″E
- Country: Estonia
- County: Võru County
- Municipality: Võru Parish

Kanariku is a village in Võru Parish, Võru County in southeastern Estonia.

Between 1977–2021, Kanariku was part of the village of Raiste.

== See also ==
- Lake Kanariku
