= Kallaste =

Town in Estonia

- Town
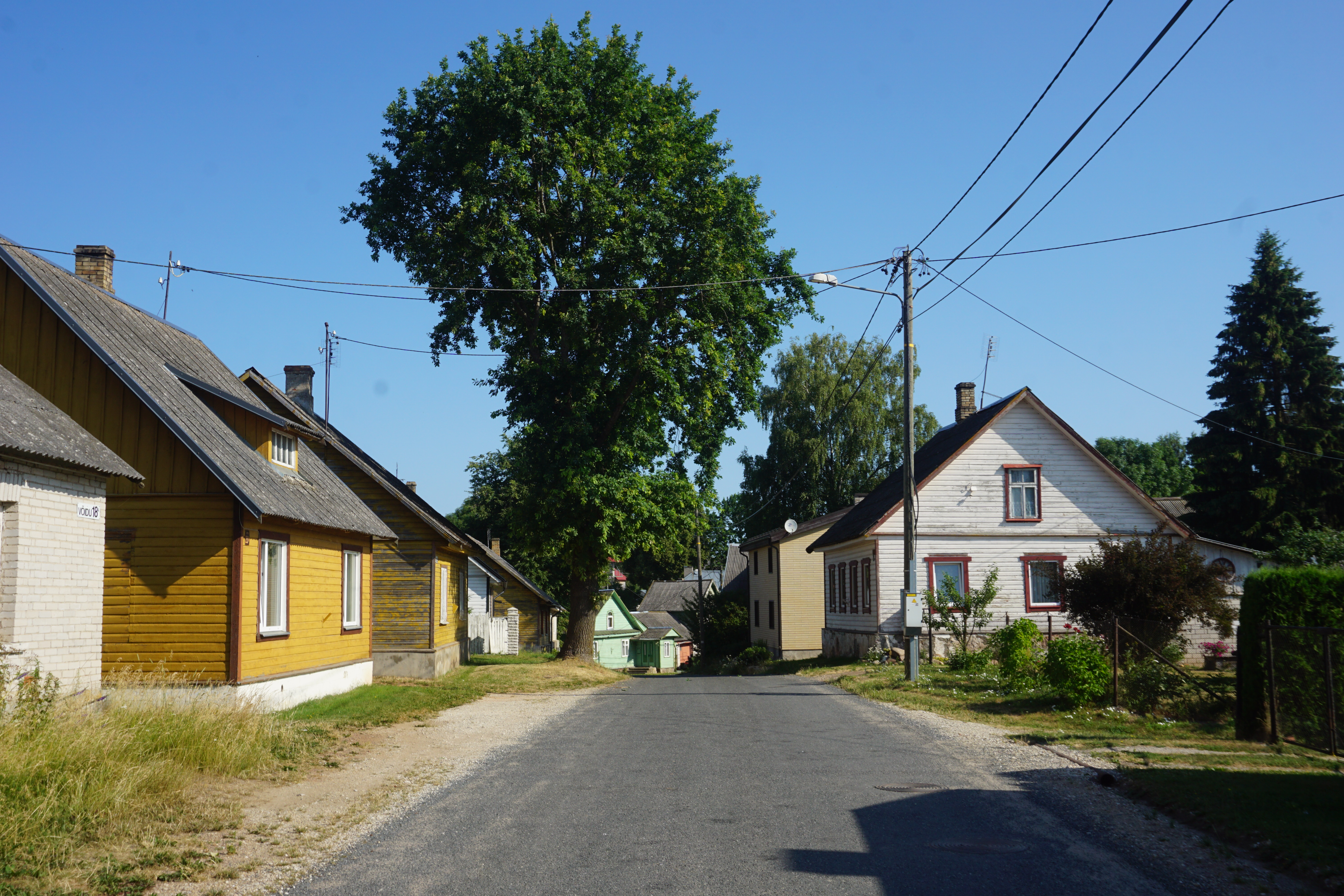
- Street in Kallaste

- Location in Estonia
- Coordinates: 58°39′55″N 27°9′44″E
- Country: Estonia
- County: Tartu County
- Municipality: Peipsiääre Parish

Area
  - Total: 1.9 km^{2} (0.73 sq mi)

Population (2026)
  - Total: 628
  - Rank: 47th
  - Density: 330/km^{2} (860/sq mi)

Kallaste is a town in Peipsiääre Parish, Tartu County, in eastern Estonia. It is located on the western shore of Lake Peipus.

== History ==
Kallaste was founded in the 18th century as a village of Russian Old Believers. It became a small borough (alevik) in 1921 and a town 1 May 1938.

== Demographics ==
Ethnic composition, 1922–2021
Ethnicity	1922		1934		1941		1959		1970		1979		1989		2000		2011		2021	
Ethnicity	amount	%	amount	%	amount	%	amount	%	amount	%	amount	%	amount	%	amount	%	amount	%	amount	%
Estonians	201	12.4	189	11.8	163	15.0	359	21.5	405	25.2	343	24.0	268	19.7	256	21.1	132	15.5	135	19.9
Russians	1424	87.5	1412	88.0	923	84.7	-	-	1140	71.1	1013	70.8	1005	73.8	883	72.9	-	-	496	72.9
Ukrainians	-	-	0	0.00	-	-	-	-	7	0.44	19	1.33	23	1.69	-	-	-	-	17	2.50
Belarusians	-	-	-	-	-	-	-	-	7	0.44	12	0.84	13	0.96	-	-	-	-	6	0.88
Finns	-	-	0	0.00	0	0.00	-	-	9	0.56	6	0.42	8	0.59	-	-	-	-	4	0.59
Jews	0	0.00	0	0.00	0	0.00	-	-	0	0.00	1	0.07	1	0.07	-	-	-	-	3	0.44
Latvians	-	-	0	0.00	0	0.00	-	-	1	0.06	1	0.07	2	0.15	-	-	-	-	0	0.00
Germans	1	0.06	4	0.25	-	-	-	-	-	-	6	0.42	3	0.22	-	-	-	-	3	0.44
Tatars	-	-	0	0.00	-	-	-	-	-	-	2	0.14	6	0.44	-	-	-	-	0	0.00
Poles	-	-	0	0.00	0	0.00	-	-	-	-	0	0.00	0	0.00	-	-	-	-	0	0.00
Lithuanians	-	-	0	0.00	0	0.00	-	-	1	0.06	1	0.07	1	0.07	-	-	-	-	6	0.88
unknown	0	0.00	0	0.00	2	0.18	0	0.00	0	0.00	0	0.00	0	0.00	0	0.00	-	-	3	0.44
other	1	0.06	0	0.00	2	0.18	1309	78.5	34	2.12	27	1.89	31	2.28	72	5.95	720	84.5	18	2.65
Total	1627	100	1605	100	1090	100	1668	100	1604	100	1431	100	1361	100	1211	100	852	100	680	101.6

== Gallery ==
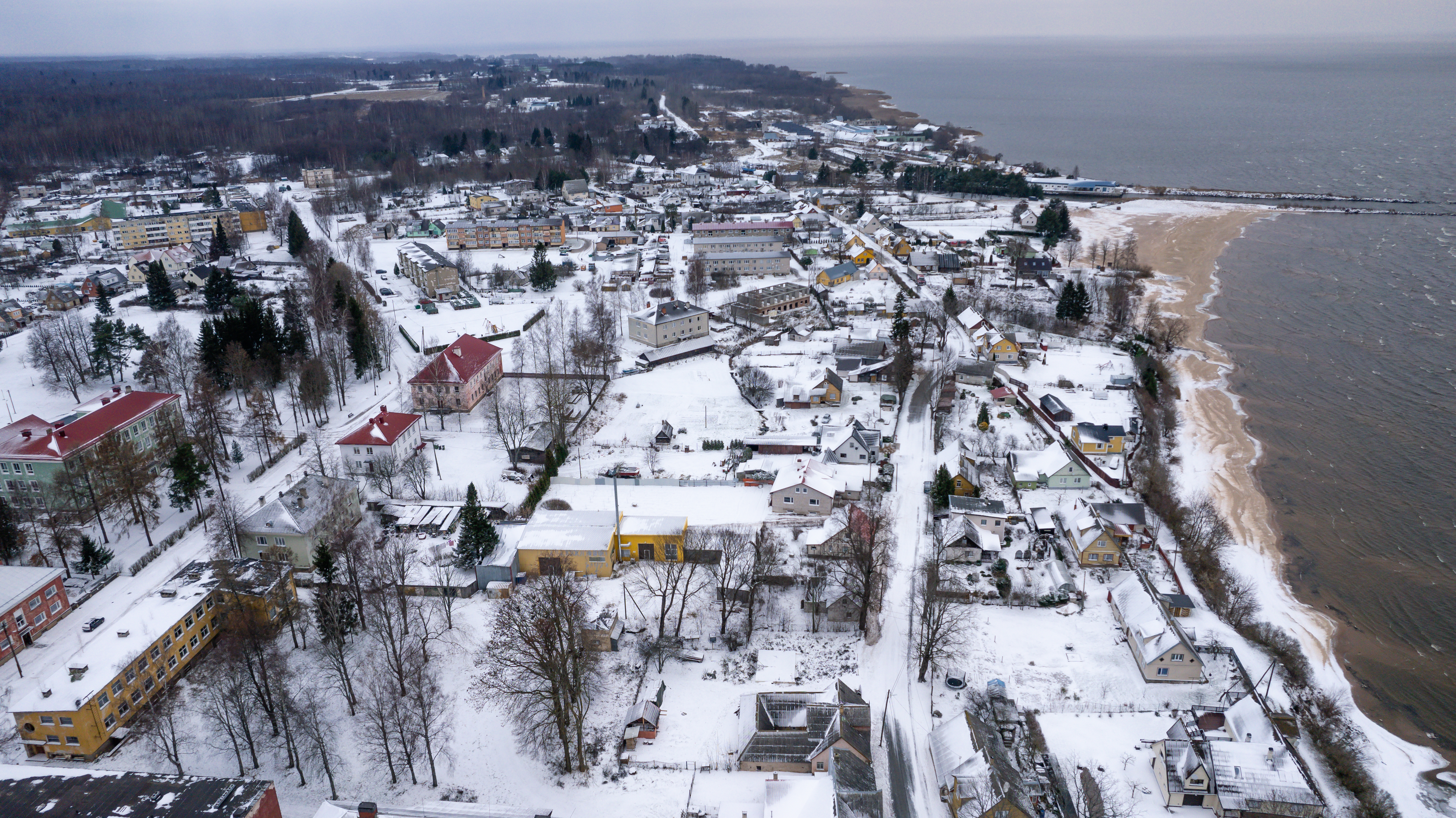
Aerial view in winter

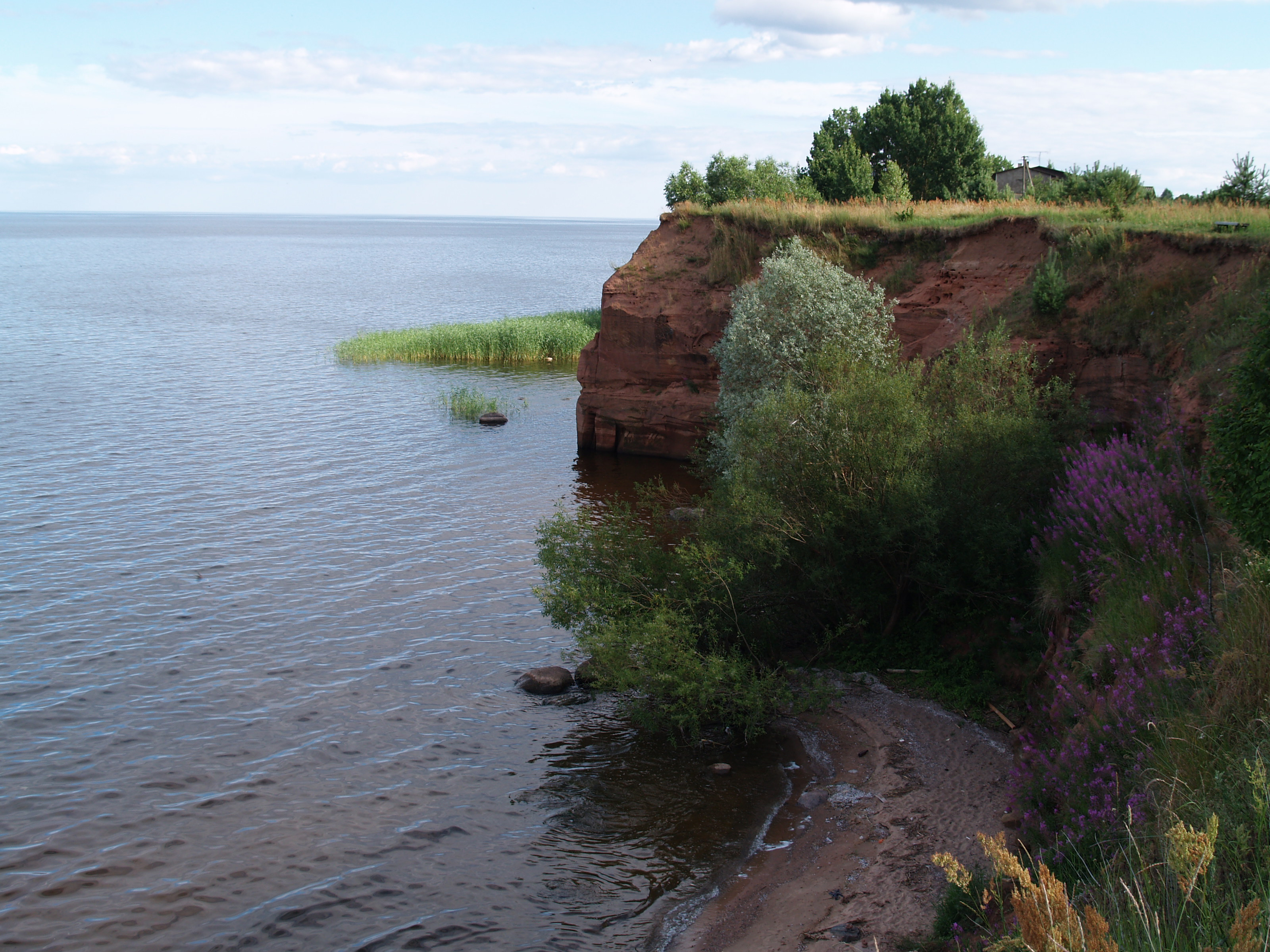
Bank in Kallaste

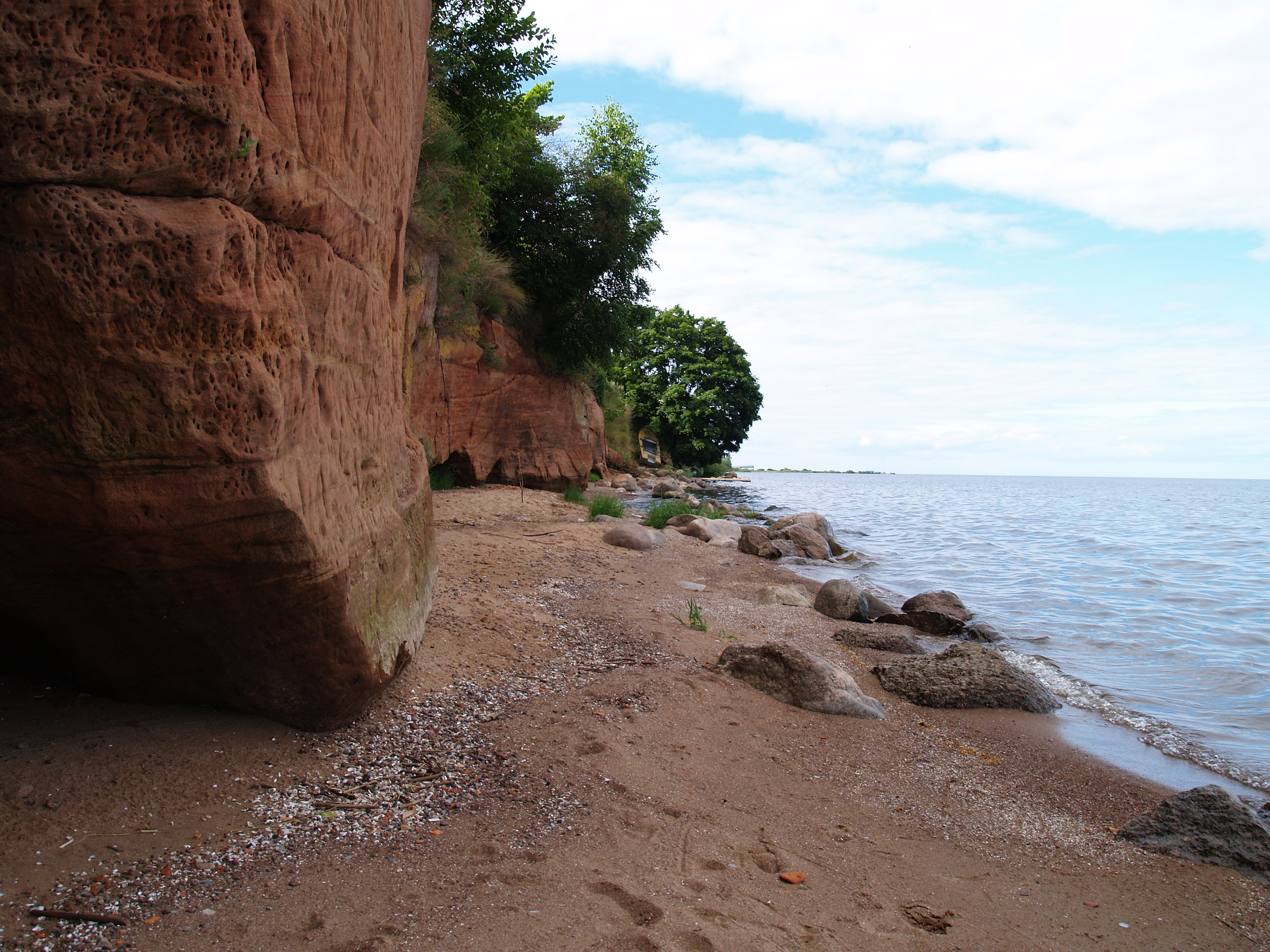

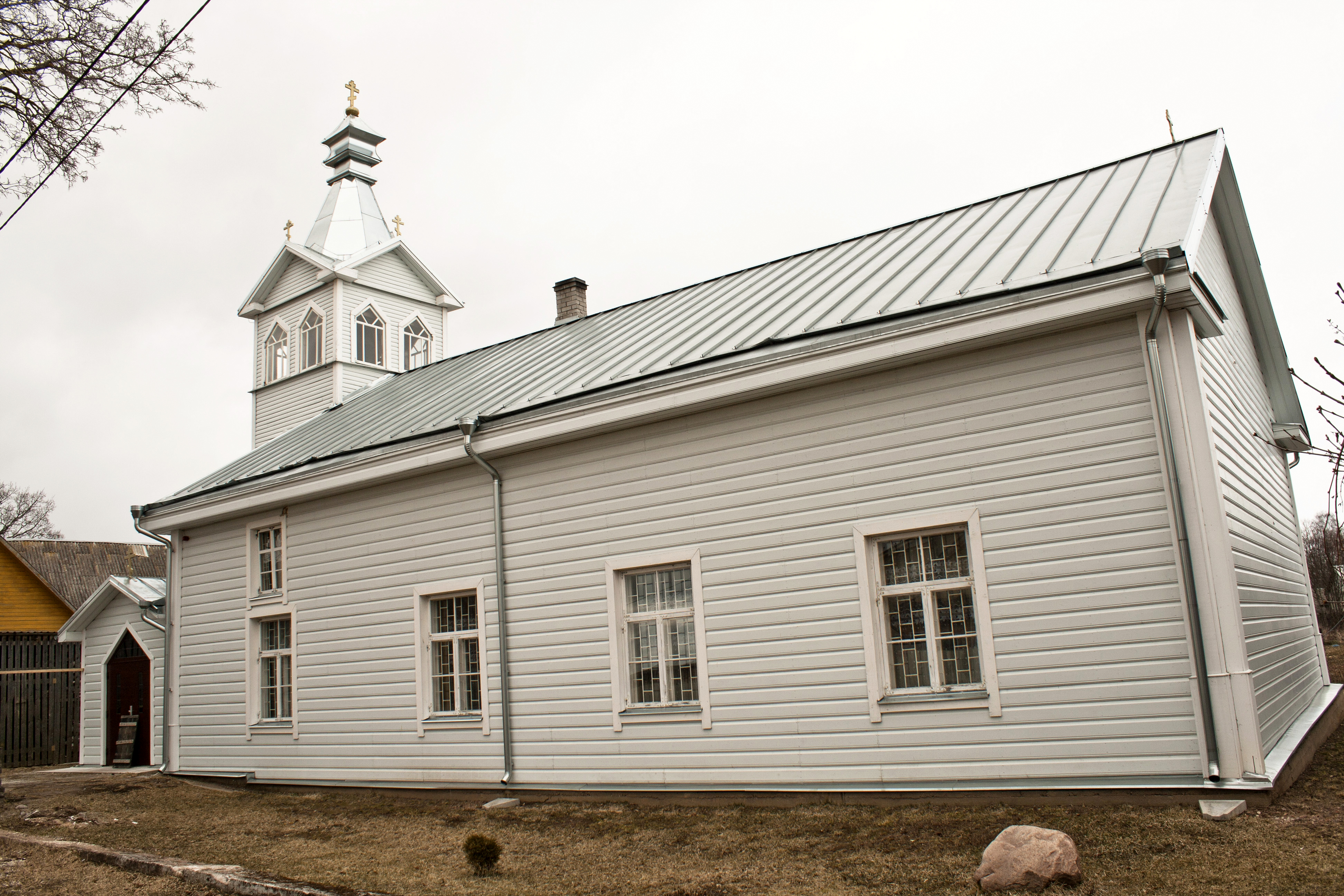
Orthodox church

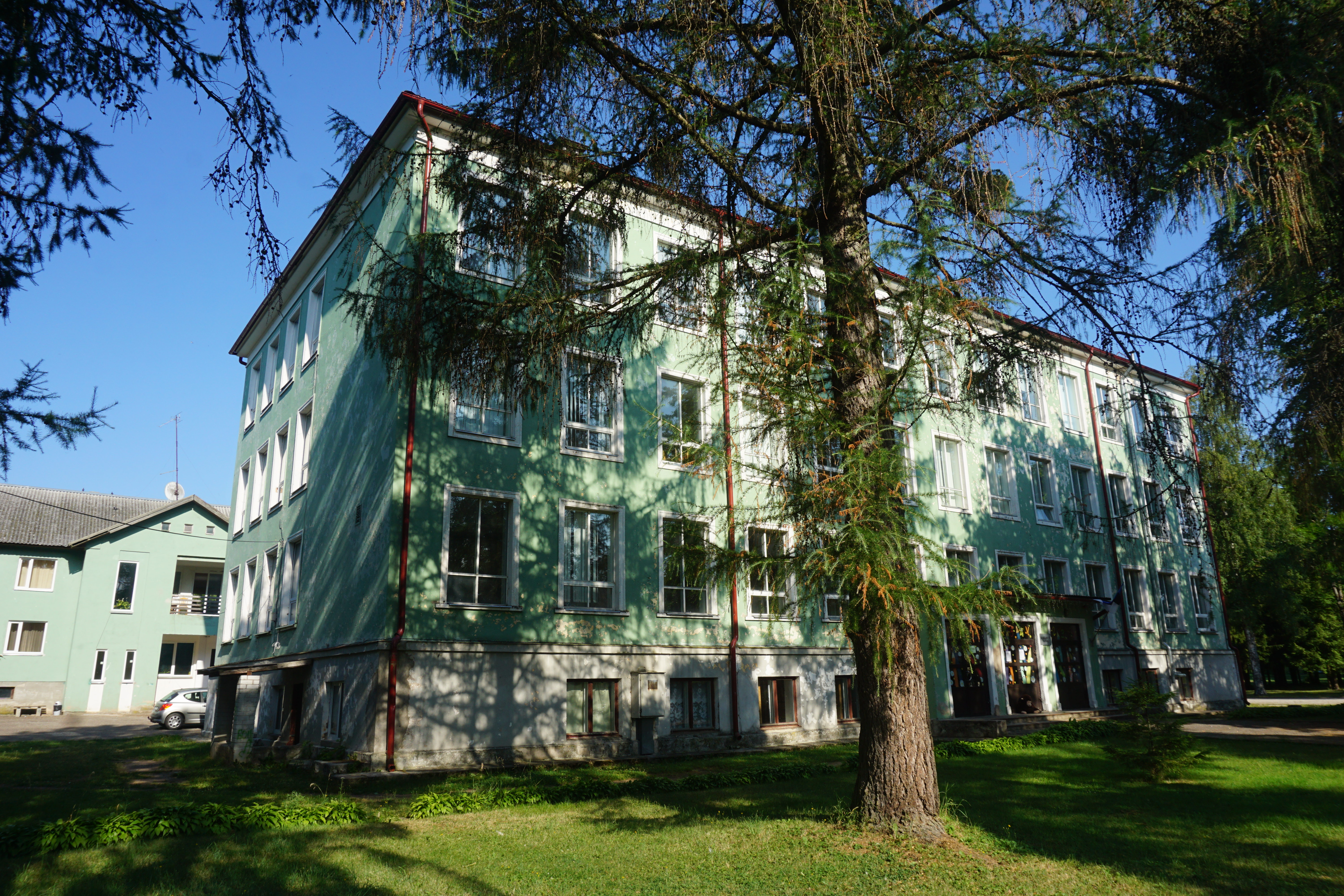
School

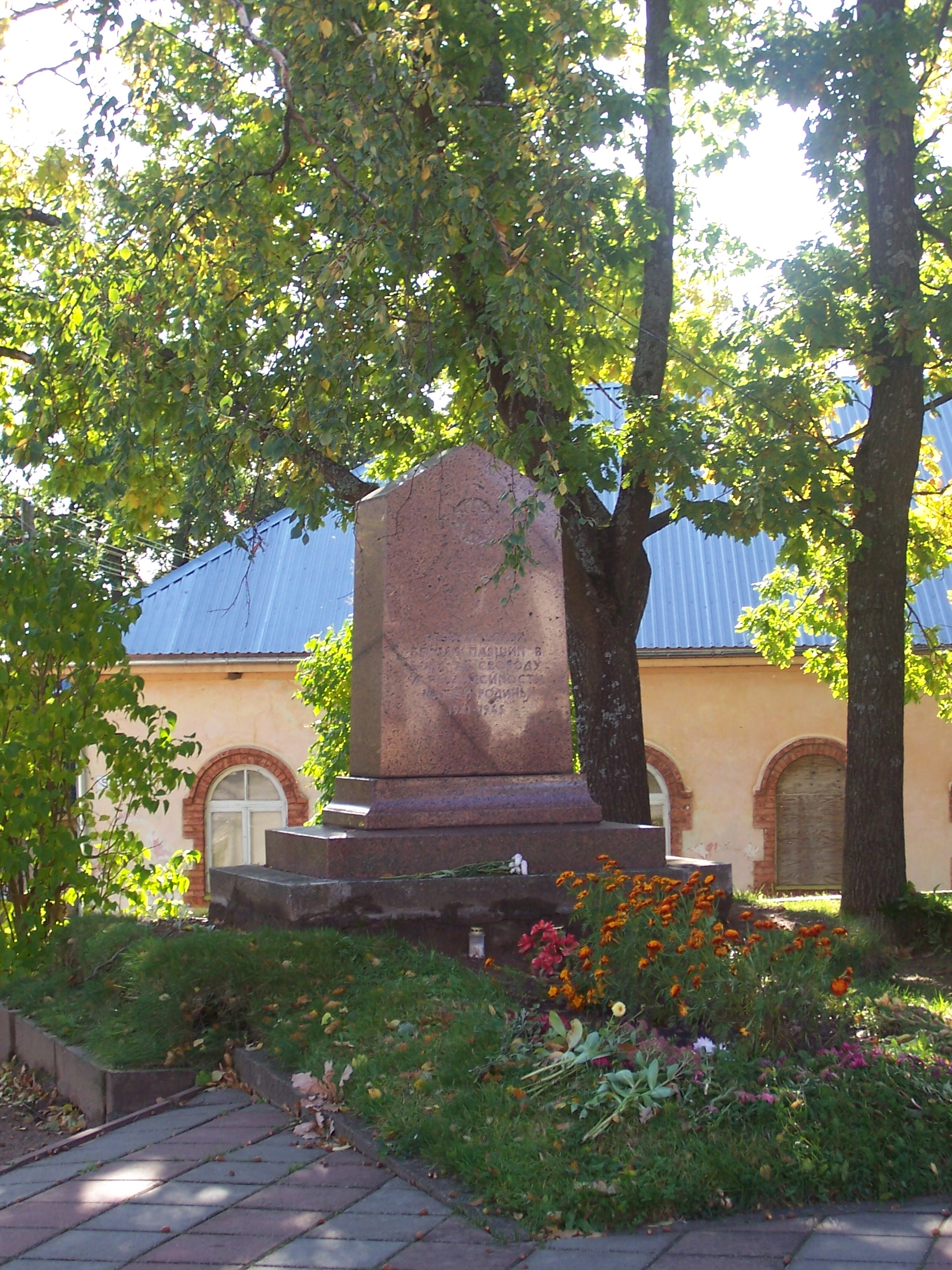
Soviet World War II memorial
