= Sadala =

Borough in Estonia

- Small borough
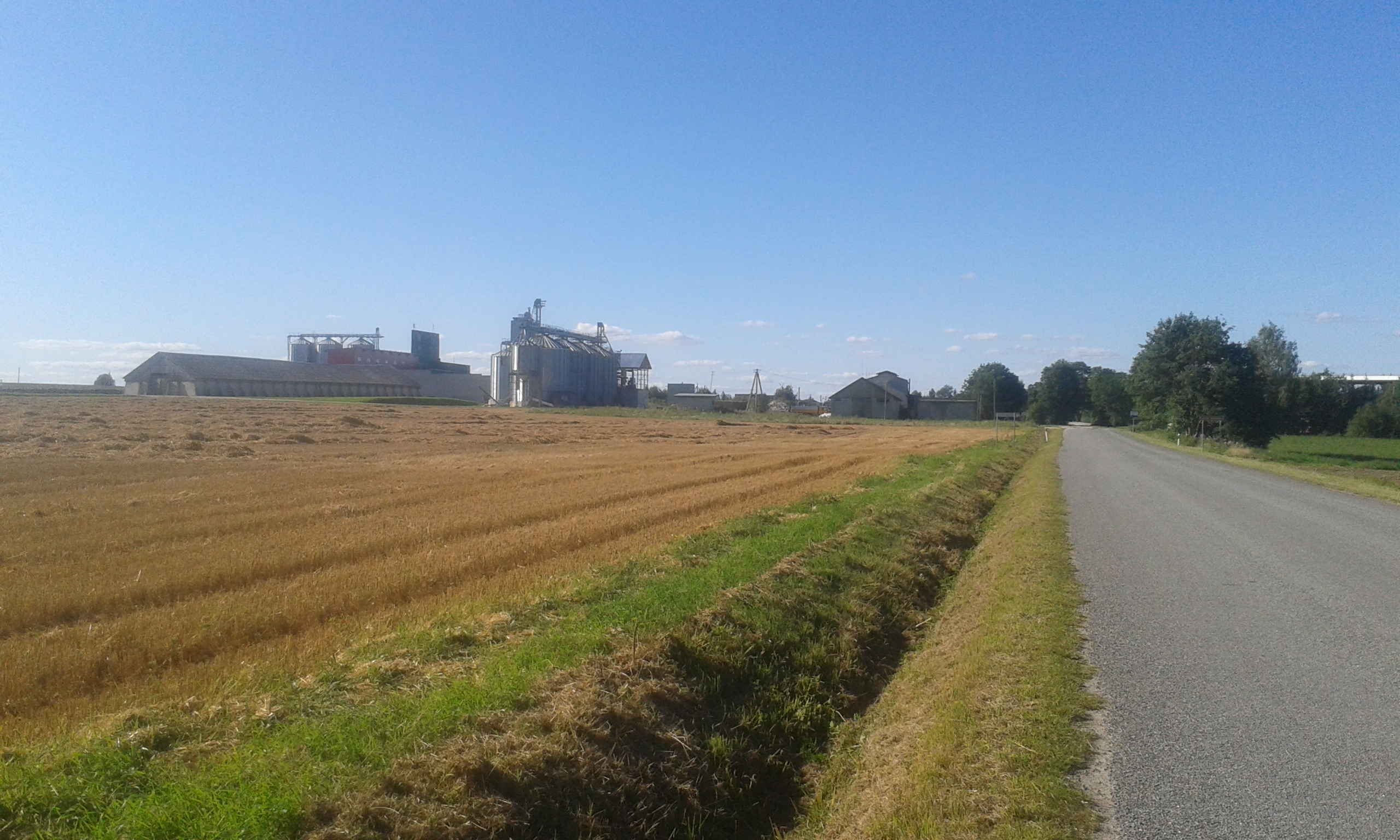

- Location in Estonia
- Coordinates: 58°52′05″N 26°36′05″E
- Country: Estonia
- County: Jõgeva County
- Municipality: Jõgeva Parish

Population (01.01.2000)
  - Total: 312

Sadala is a small borough (Estonian: alevik) in Jõgeva Parish, Jõgeva County, Estonia. It is located about 18 km northeast of the town of Jõgeva and 19 km west of Mustvee. In 2000 it had a population of 312.
