= Raiste =

Village in Estonia

- Location within Estonia
- Coordinates: 57°55′01″N 26°56′43″E
- Country: Estonia
- County: Võru County
- Municipality: Võru Parish

Raiste is a village in Estonia, in Võru Parish, which belongs to Võru County.

On 19 November 2021 Kanariku village was established from part of Raiste village territory.
