= Kudjape =

Borough in Estonia

- Small borough
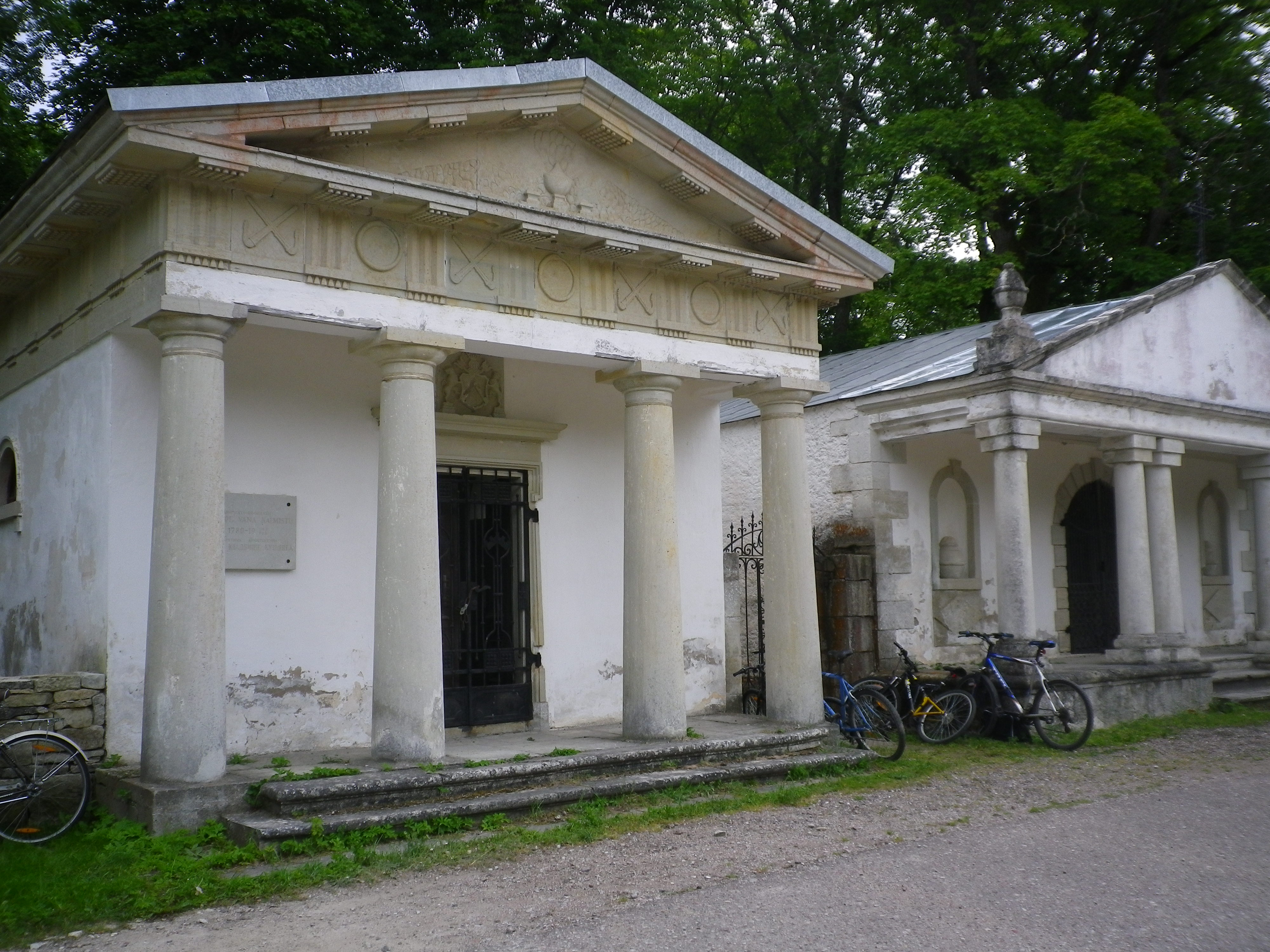
- Entrance of Kudjape Cemetery

- Location in Estonia
- Coordinates: 58°15′38″N 22°31′9″E
- Country: Estonia
- County: Saare County
- Municipality: Saaremaa Parish

Population (2011 Census)
  - Total: 574

Kudjape (German: Kudjapäh) is a small borough (Estonian: alevik) in Saaremaa Parish, Saare County in western Estonia. As of the 2011 census, the settlement's population was 574.
