= Elbi =

Village in Estonia

Coordinates: 58°33′N 24°48′E

- Village
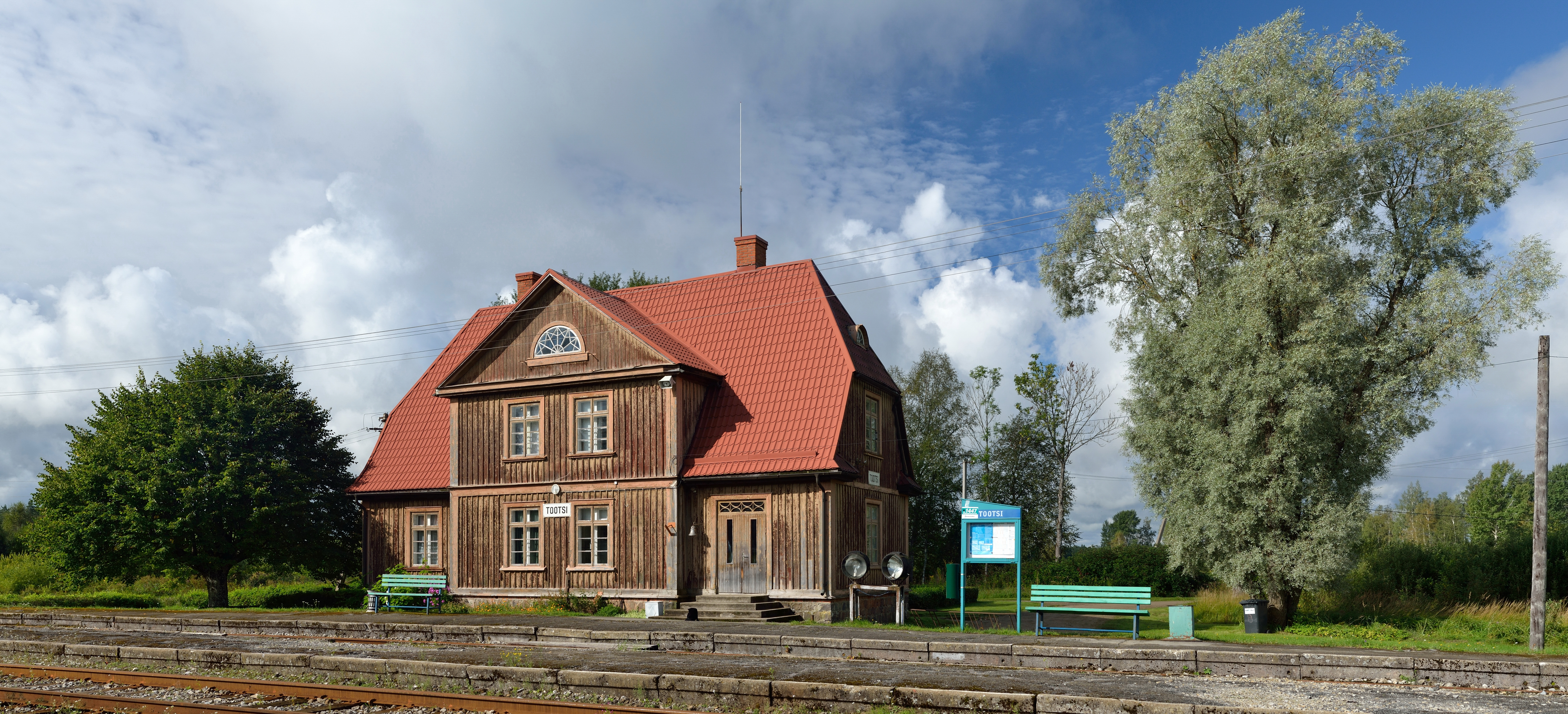
- Tootsi train station in Elbi
- Interactive map of Elbi
- Country: Estonia
- County: Pärnu County
- Parish: Põhja-Pärnumaa Parish
- Time zone: UTC+2 (EET)
  - Summer (DST): UTC+3 (EEST)

Elbi is a village in Põhja-Pärnumaa Parish, Pärnu County in southwestern Estonia, and it immediately borders the borough of Tootsi.

Tootsi station on the Edelaraudtee's western route is located in Elbi.
