= Kamari, Estonia =

Village in Estonia

Coordinates: 58°36′N 26°00′E

Kamari
- Small borough
- Interactive map of Kamari
- Country: Estonia
- County: Jõgeva County
- Parish: Põltsamaa Parish
- Time zone: UTC+2 (EET)
  - Summer (DST): UTC+3 (EEST)

Kamari is a small borough in Põltsamaa Parish, Jõgeva County in eastern Estonia.

There is Kamari Hydroelectric Power Station located on the Põltsamaa River. The station was launched in 1956. In 1971, the station was closed. The station was re-launched in 1999.
