= Veriora =

Borough in Estonia

- Location within Estonia
- Coordinates: 58°0′15″N 27°21′7″E
- Country: Estonia
- County: Põlva County
- Parish: Räpina Parish
- Time zone: UTC+2 (EET)

Veriora is a small borough (alevik) in Räpina Parish, Põlva County, southeastern Estonia. Until 2017, it was the administrative centre of Veriora Parish.

== Gallery ==
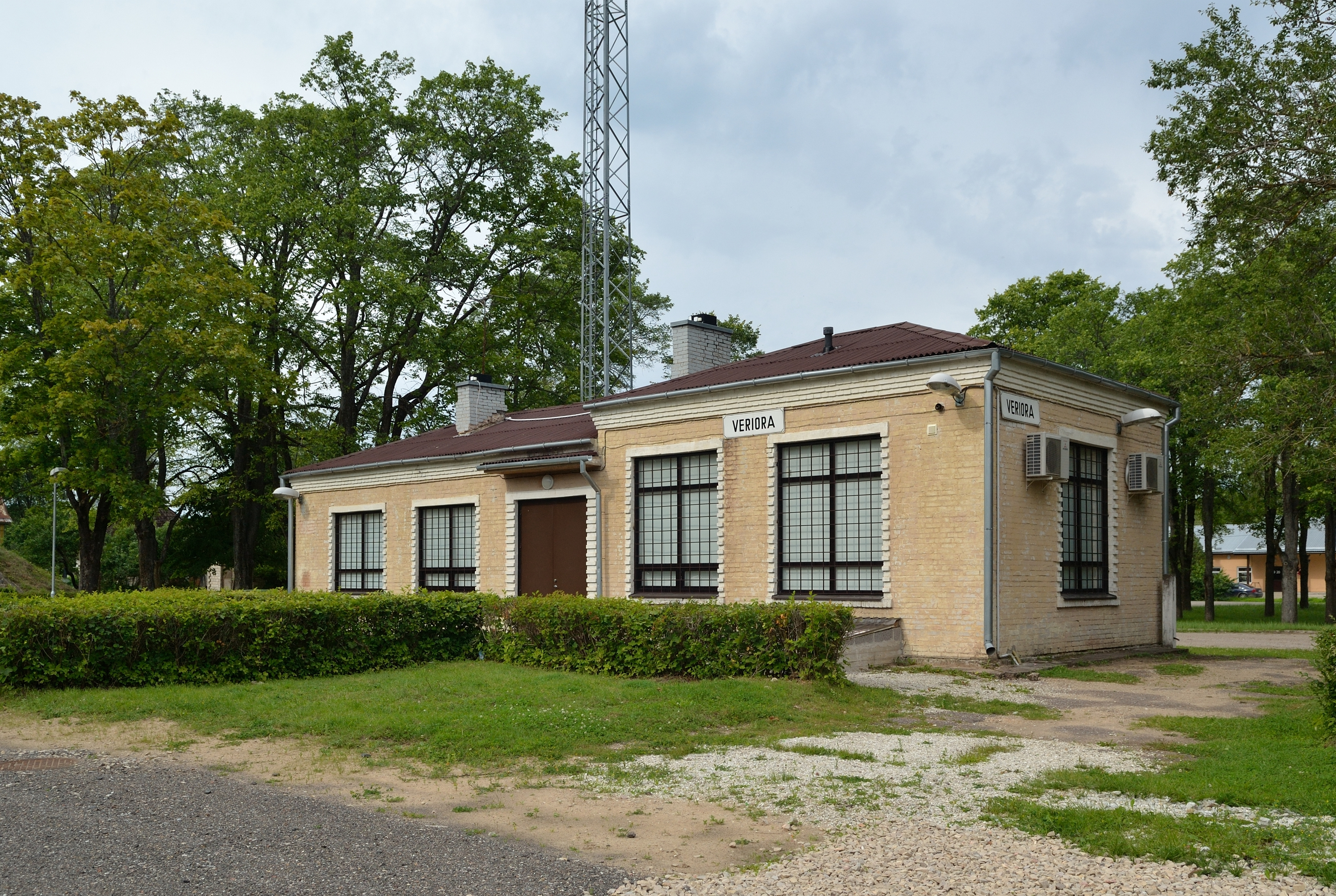
Main building of Veriora railway station

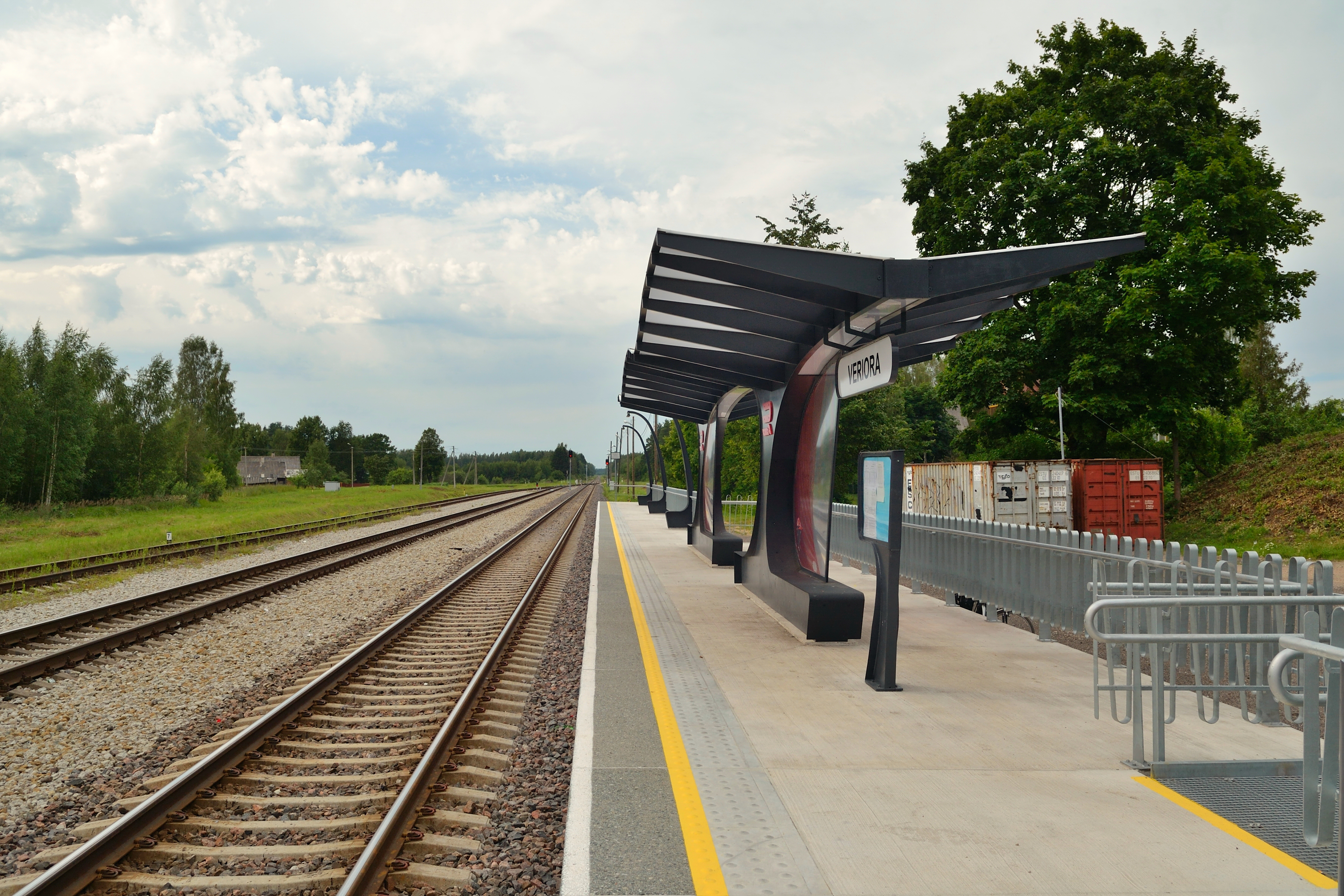
platform

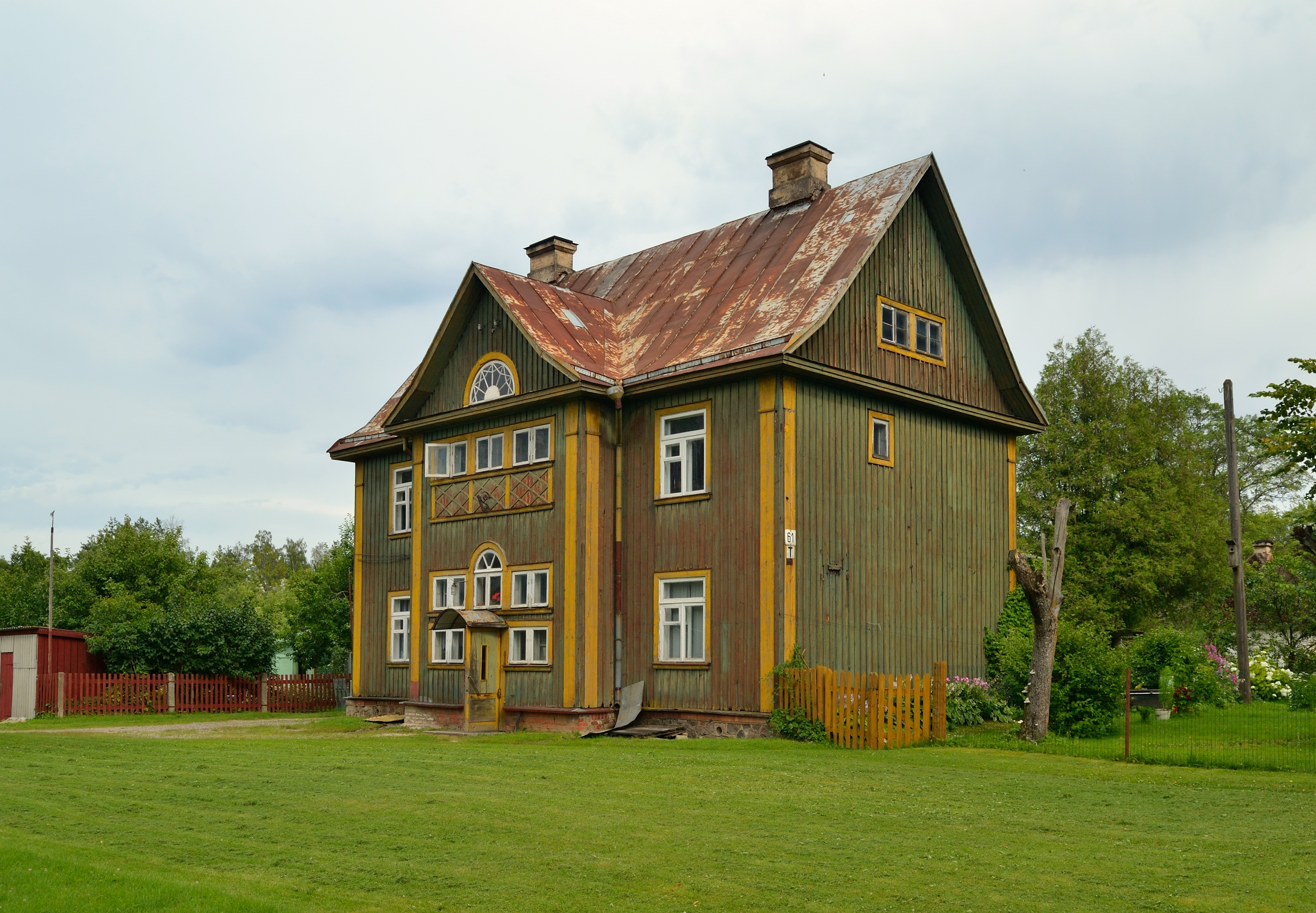
Residential building of the station

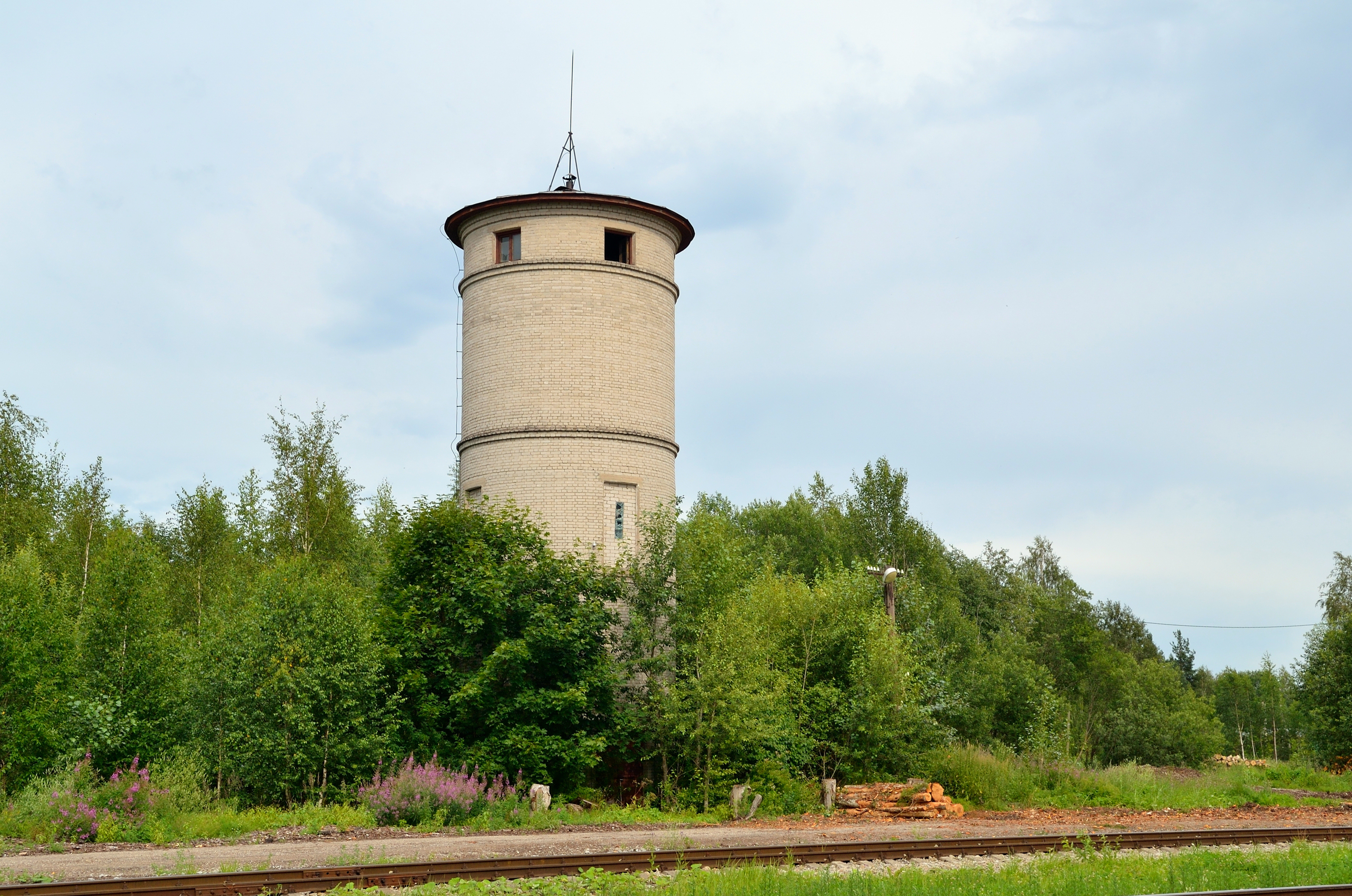
Water tower

Preceding station	Elron	Following station
Ruusa towards Tallinn	Tallinn–Tartu–Koidula	Ilumetsa towards Koidula
