= Jõgeva (small borough) =

Borough in Estonia

- Location within Estonia
- Coordinates: 58°45′51″N 26°23′51″E
- Country: Estonia
- County: Jõgeva County

Population (2010)
  - Total: 597
- Time zone: UTC+2 (EET)

Drone video of Jõgeva borough and Pedja river in Estonia (June 2022)

Jõgeva is a small borough (alevik) in Jõgeva Parish, Jõgeva County in eastern Estonia.

It is the site of Jõgeva manor house, built in the 19th century. Around the main building of the manor, there are several other buildings, including an old watermill, built in the end of 18th century. The site is under state protection as cultural monument.

== See also ==
- Jõgeva
