= Oisu =

Borough in Estonia

Coordinates: 58°45′27″N 25°34′00″E

- Small borough
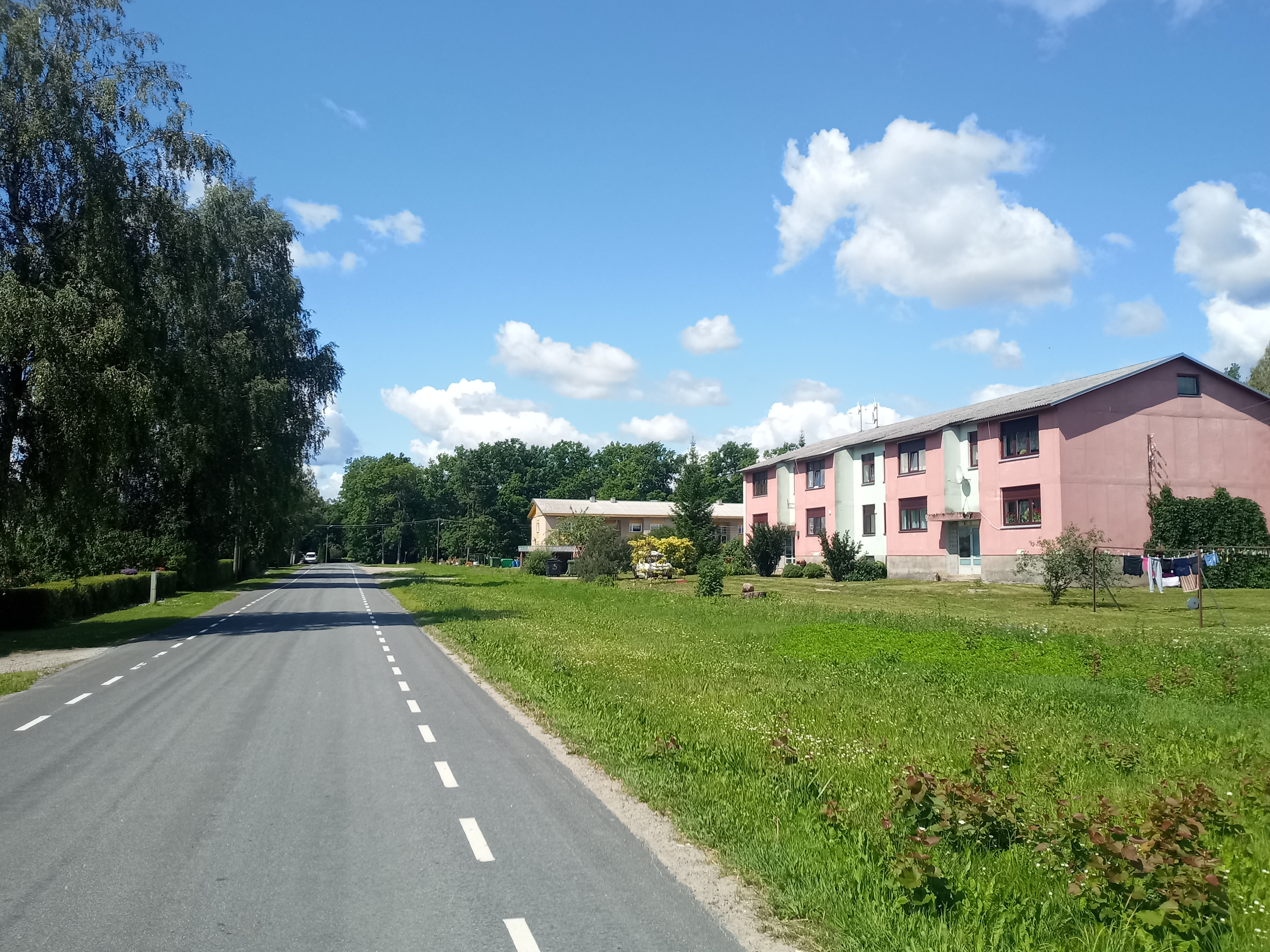
- Oisu in 2023
- Interactive map of Oisu
- Country: Estonia
- County: Järva County
- Parish: Türi Parish
- Time zone: UTC+2 (EET)
  - Summer (DST): UTC+3 (EEST)

Oisu (German: Oiso) is a small borough in Türi Parish, Järva County in central Estonia. From 1991–2005, it was the administrative centre of Oisu Parish.
