= Verijärv Landscape Conservation Area =

Protected area in Estonia

Verijärve Landscape Conservation Area
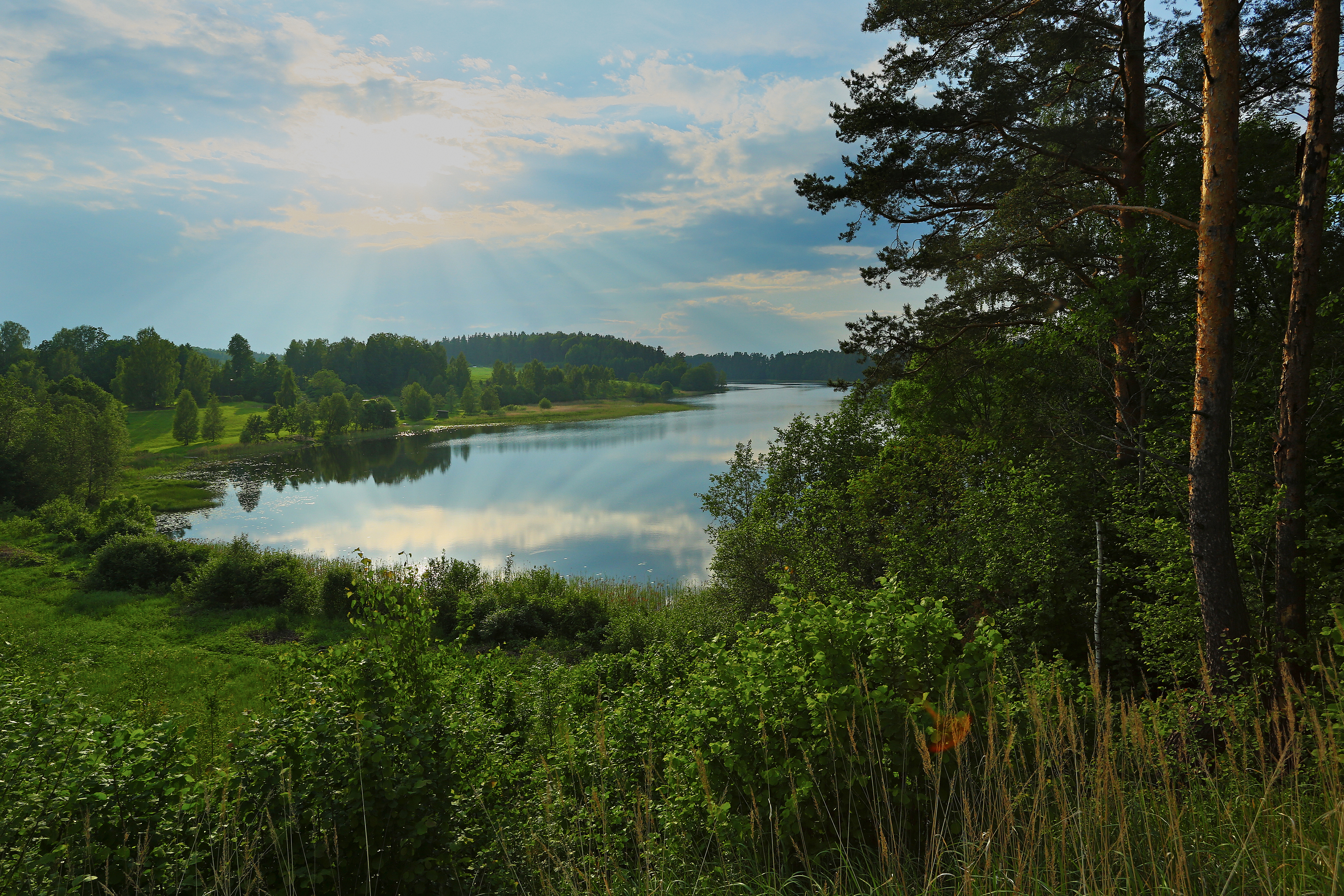

- Location within Estonia
- Location: Estonia
- Coordinates: 57°48′30″N 27°03′00″E
- Area: 81 ha (200 acres)
- Established: 1958 (2015)

Verijärve Landscape Conservation Area is a nature park situated in Võru County, Estonia.

Its area is 81 ha.

The protected area was designated in 1958 to protect lake Verijärv and its surrounding areas. In 2015, the protected area was redesigned to the landscape conservation area.
