= Parksepa =

Borough in Estonia

- Location within Estonia
- Coordinates: 57°54′35″N 26°58′59″E
- Country: Estonia
- County: Võru County
- Parish: Võru Parish
- Time zone: UTC+2 (EET)

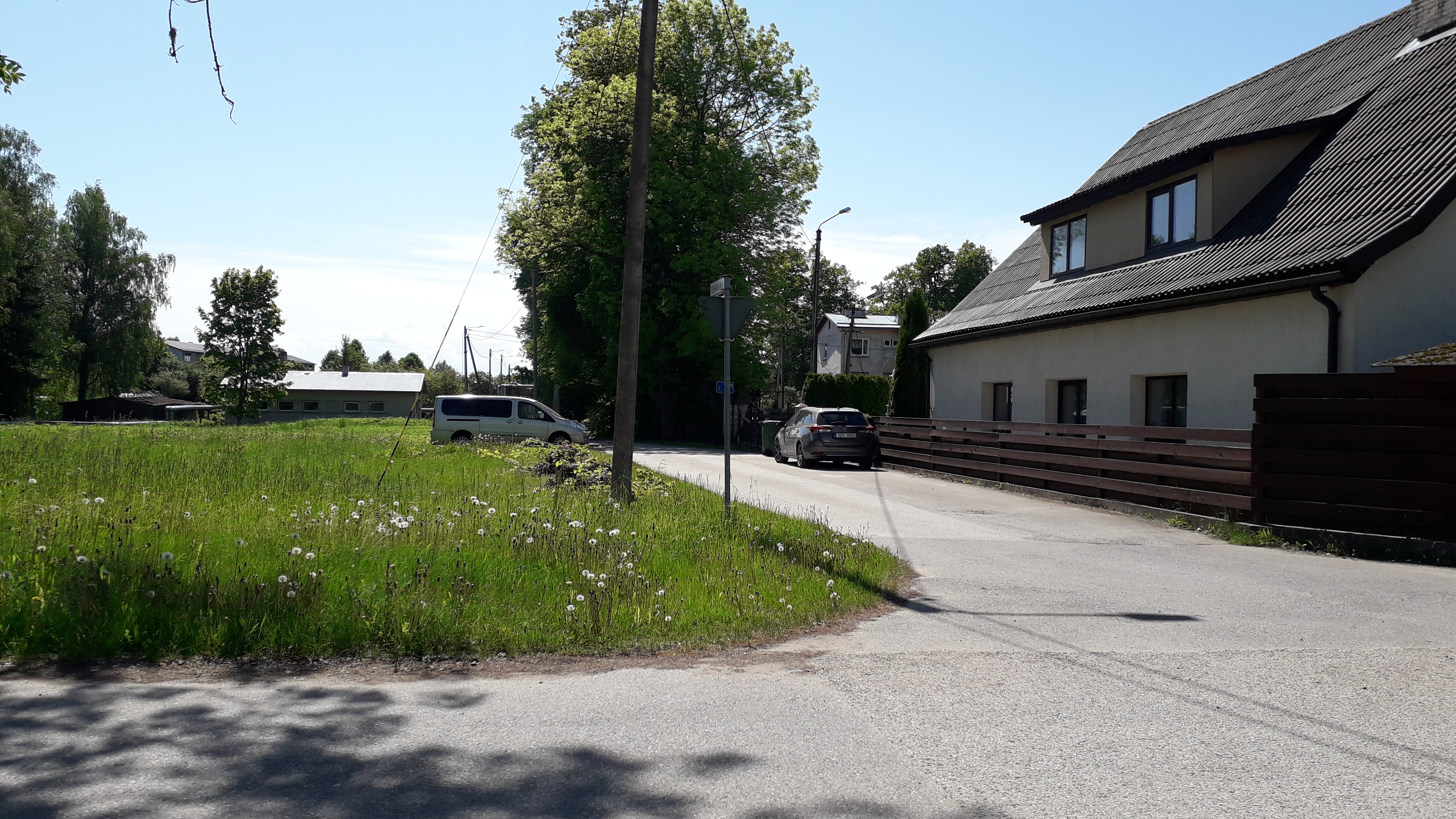
Parksepa, small borough in South East Estonia

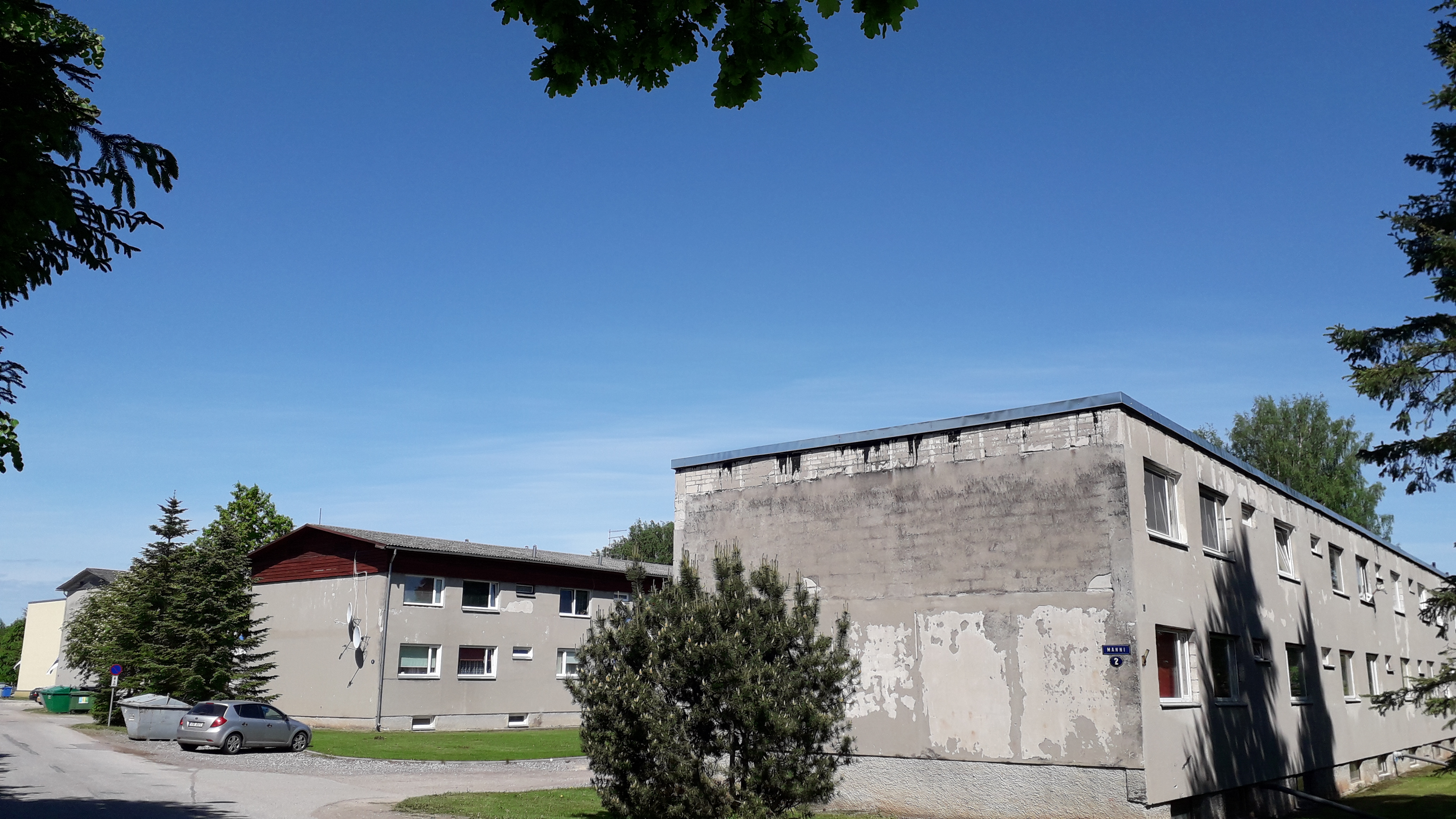
Parksepa, Võru county

Parksepa is a small borough (alevik) in Võru Parish, Võru County in southeastern Estonia.
