= Siimusti =

Borough in Estonia

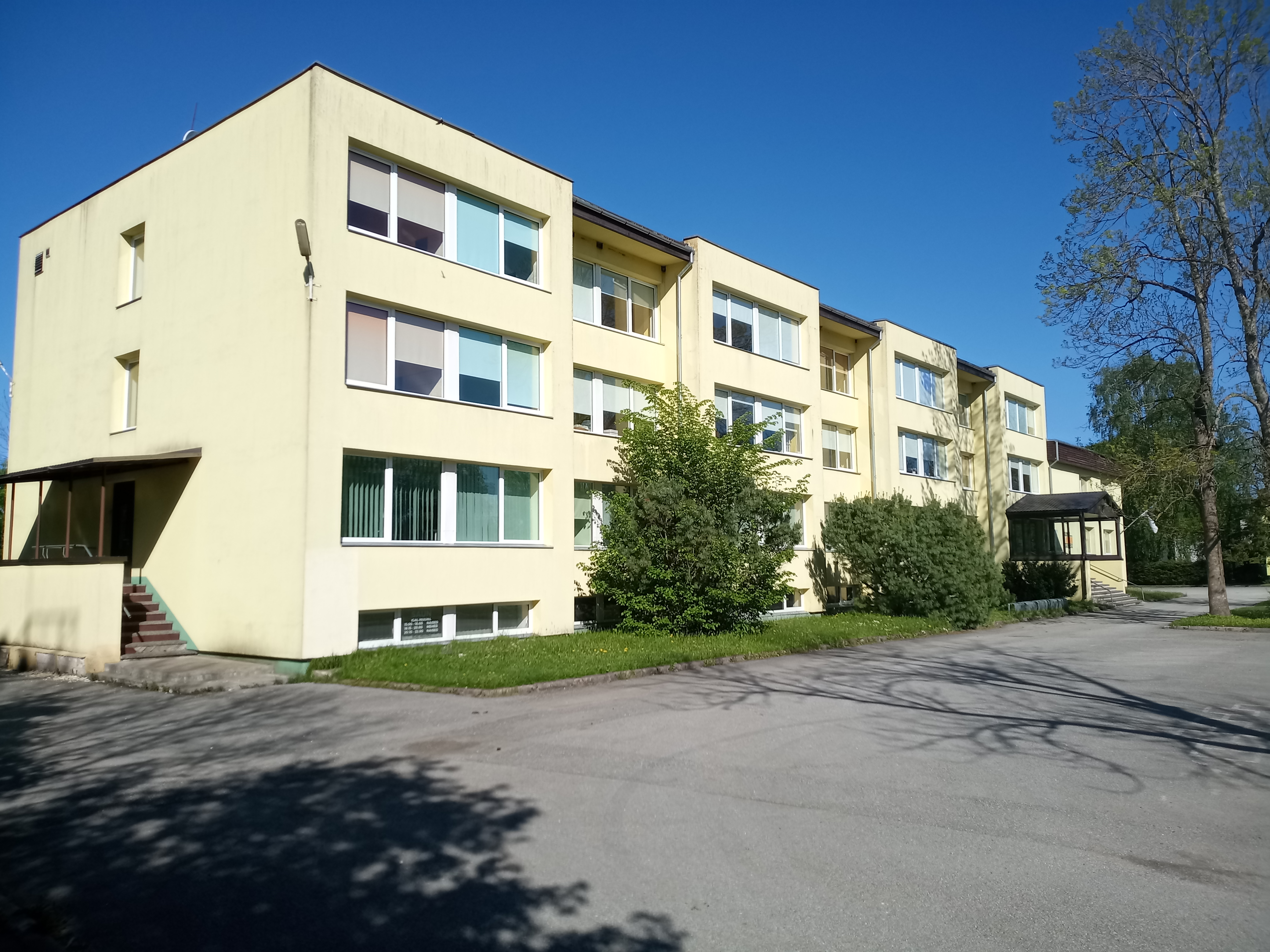
- Siimusti library

- Location within Estonia
- Coordinates: 58°43′47″N 26°20′22″E
- Country: Estonia
- County: Jõgeva County
- Parish: Jõgeva Parish
- Time zone: UTC+2 (EET)

Siimusti is a small borough (alevik) in Jõgeva Parish, Jõgeva County in eastern Estonia.
