= Tootsi =

Borough in Estonia

- Borough
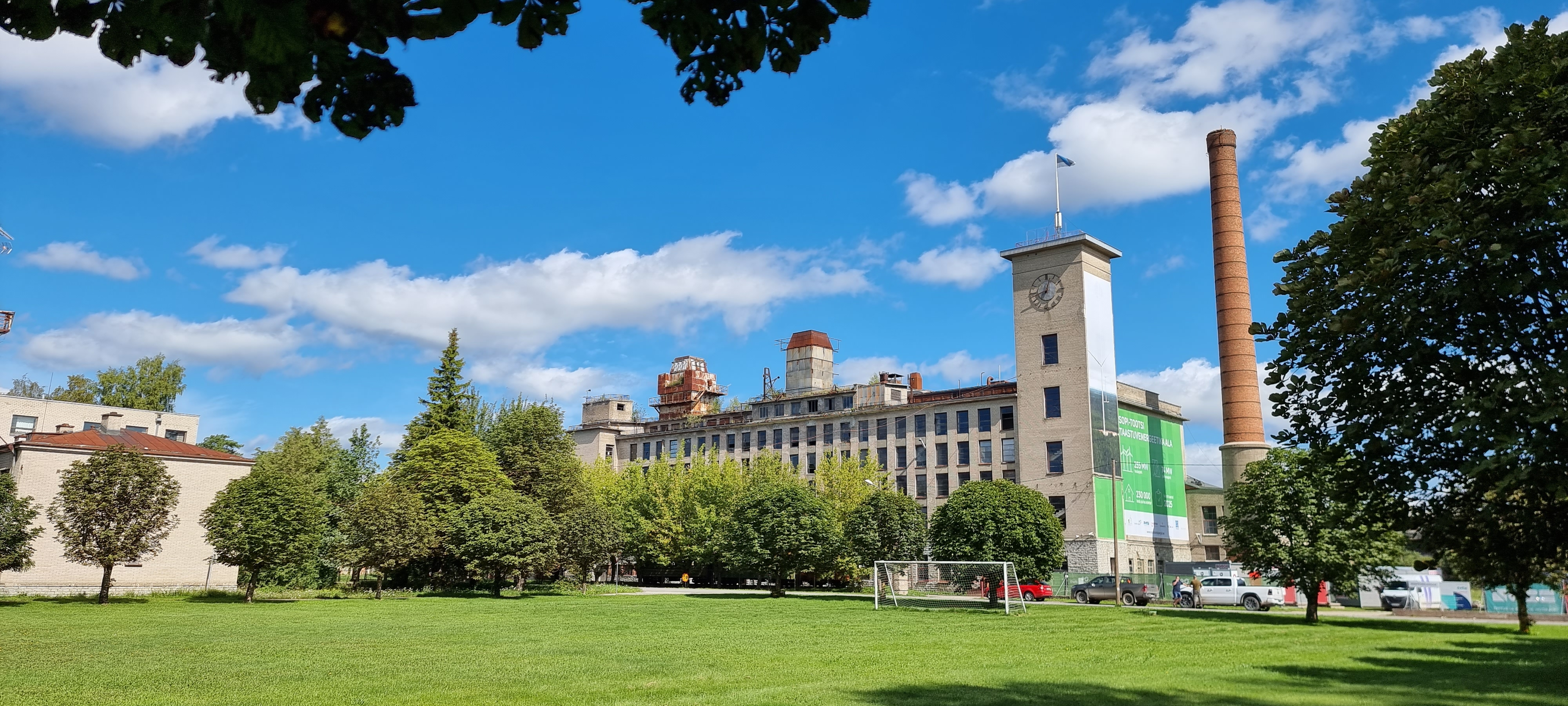
- Former Tootsi peat factory

- Location in Estonia
- Coordinates: 58°35′10″N 24°47′8″E
- Country: Estonia
- County: Pärnu County
- Municipality: Põhja-Pärnumaa Parish

Area
  - Total: 1.76 km^{2} (0.68 sq mi)

Population (2021)
  - Total: 774
  - Density: 440/km^{2} (1,140/sq mi)

Tootsi is a borough (Estonian: alev) in Põhja-Pärnumaa Parish, Pärnu County, in southwestern Estonia. Before the administrative reform in 2017, Tootsi had a municipality status of its own as Tootsi Parish (Tootsi vald) within Pärnu County. It has the population of 951 (as of 1 January 2009) and an area of 1.76 km².

Tootsi was founded in 1938, and in 1949 was granted borough rights.

Until December 2018 Tootsi had a station on the Tallinn - Pärnu railway line operated by Elron located in the neighbouring village of Elbi.

There is a museum dedicated to the peat industry in Tootsi.

Musician and playwright Ivar Põllu was born in Tootsi in 1974.
