= Olustvere Parish =

Former municipality of Estonia

Olustvere Parish Olustvere vald
- Former municipality of Estonia
- Interactive map of Olustvere Parish
- Coordinates: 58.55°N 25.57°E
- Country: Estonia
- Administrative centre: Olustvere

Olustvere Parish (Estonian: Olustvere vald) was a rural municipality of Estonia, in Viljandi County. The parish existed until 1950. The parish re-established in 1991. The parish was liquidated in 2005.
