= Oisu Parish =

Former municipality of Estonia

Oisu Parish Oisu vald
- Former municipality of Estonia
- Interactive map of Oisu Parish
- Coordinates: 58.75°N 25.55°E
- Country: Estonia
- Administrative centre: Oisu

Oisu Parish (Estonian: Oisu vald) was a rural municipality of Estonia, in Järva County. The parish existed until 1892. The parish was re-established in 1991. The parish was liquidated in 2005.
