= Verijärve =

Village in Estonia

- Village
- Location within Estonia
- Coordinates: 57.805°N 27.0606°E
- Country: Estonia
- County: Võru County
- Parish: Võru Parish
- Time zone: UTC+2 (EET)
  - Summer (DST): UTC+3 (EEST)

Verijärve is a village in Võru Parish, Võru County in Estonia.

The wood industry company Barrus is based in the village.

== Gallery ==
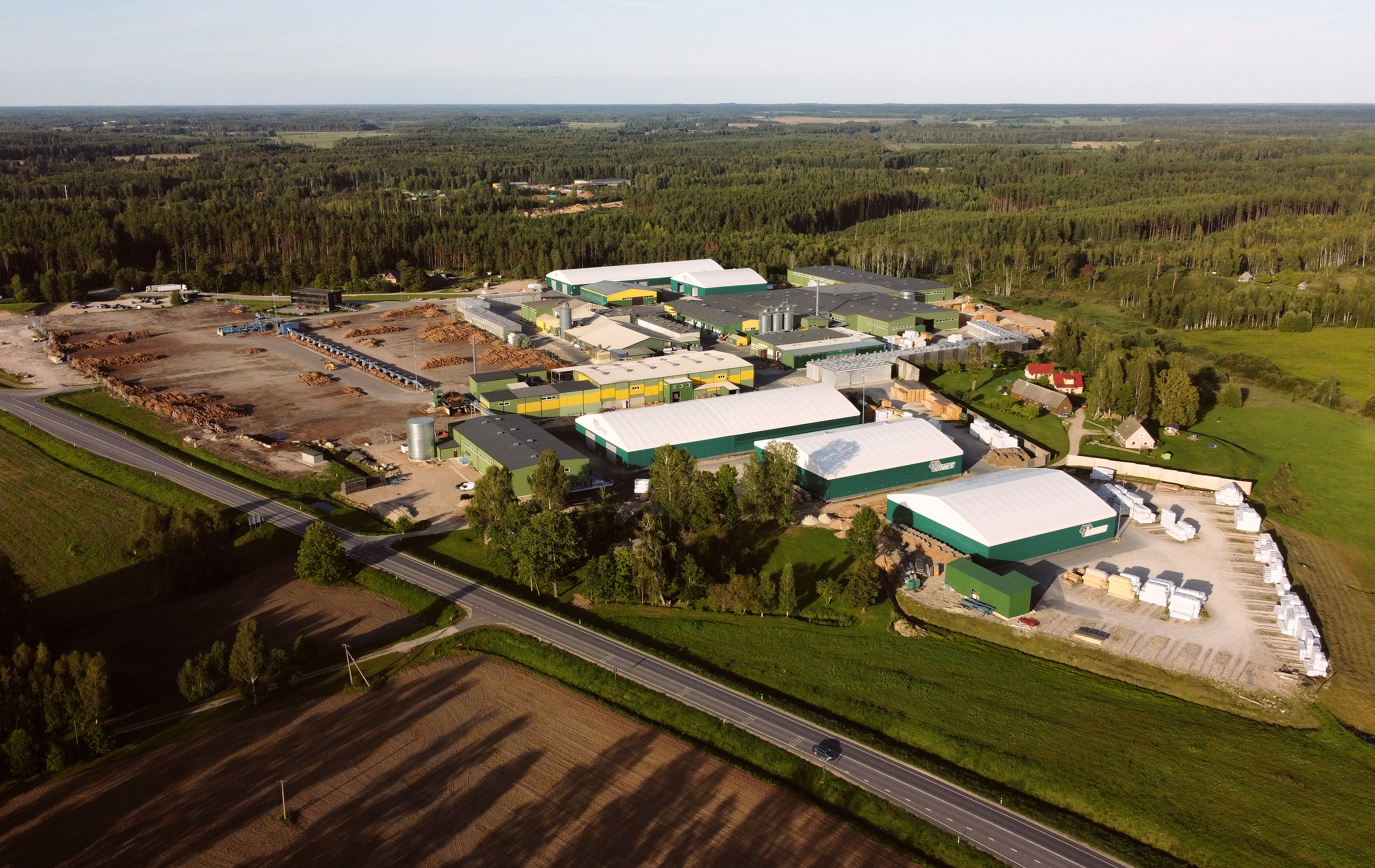
Aerial view of the Barrus company
