= NUTS statistical regions of Estonia =

Statistical regions of Estonia

The Nomenclature of Territorial Units for Statistics (NUTS) is a geocode standard for referencing the subdivisions of Estonia for statistical purposes. The standard is developed and regulated by the European Union. The NUTS standard is instrumental in delivering the European Union's Structural Funds. The NUTS code for Estonia is EE and a hierarchy of three levels is established by Eurostat. Below these is a further levels of geographic organisation - the local administrative unit (LAU). In Estonia, the LAU 1 is counties and the LAU 2 are municipalities.

== Overall ==
=== NUTS Codes ===
Level	Subdivisions	#
NUTS 1	—	1
NUTS 2	—	1
NUTS 3	Groups of counties (Groups of Maakond)	5

=== Local administrative units ===
Below the NUTS levels, the two LAU (Local Administrative Units) levels are:

Level	Subdivisions	#
LAU 1	Counties (Maakond)	15
LAU 2	Municipalities (Vald, linn)	79

The LAU codes of Estonia can be downloaded here:

== NUTS codes ==
NUTS 1	Code	NUTS 2	Code	NUTS 3	Code
Estonia	EE0	Estonia	EE00	Põhja-Eesti	EE001
Estonia	EE0	Estonia	EE00	Lääne-Eesti	EE004
Estonia	EE0	Estonia	EE00	Kesk-Eesti	EE009
Estonia	EE0	Estonia	EE00	Kirde-Eesti	EE00A
Estonia	EE0	Estonia	EE00	Lõuna-Eesti	EE008

=== NUTS 3 ===
EE0 Estonia

EE00 Estonia

EE001 Põhja-Eesti (Harju County)
EE004 Lääne-Eesti (Hiiu County, Lääne County, Pärnu County, Saare County)
EE009 Kesk-Eesti (Järva County, Lääne-Viru County, Rapla County)
EE00A Kirde-Eesti (Ida-Viru County)
EE008 Lõuna-Eesti (Jõgeva County, Põlva County, Tartu County, Valga County, Viljandi County, Võru County)

== See also ==
- Subdivisions of Estonia
- ISO 3166-2 codes of Estonia
- FIPS region codes of Estonia

== Sources ==
- Hierarchical list of the Nomenclature of territorial units for statistics - NUTS and the Statistical regions of Europe
- Overview map of EU Countries - NUTS level 1
  - EESTI - NUTS level 2
  - EESTI - NUTS level 3
- Correspondence between the NUTS levels and the national administrative units
- List of current NUTS codes
  - Download current NUTS codes (ODS format)
- Counties of Estonia, Statoids.com
