= ISO 3166-2:EE =

Entry for Estonia in ISO 3166-2

ISO 3166-2:EE is the entry for Estonia in ISO 3166-2, part of the ISO 3166 standard published by the International Organization for Standardization (ISO), which defines codes for the names of the principal subdivisions (e.g., provinces or states) of all countries coded in ISO 3166-1.

Currently for Estonia, ISO 3166-2 codes are defined for 15 counties, 64 rural municipalities, and 15 urban municipalities.

Each code consists of two parts, separated by a hyphen. The first part is EE, the ISO 3166-1 alpha-2 code of Estonia. The second part is two digits for counties or three digits for municipalities.

== Current codes ==
Subdivision names are listed as in the ISO 3166-2 standard published by the ISO 3166 Maintenance Agency (ISO 3166/MA).

Subdivision names are sorted in Estonian alphabetical order: a-v, õ, ä, ö, ü.

Click on the button in the header to sort each column.

=== Counties ===
| Code | Subdivision name (et) | Subdivision name (en) (Note: For reference only, English name not included in the ISO 3166-2 standard.) |
|---|---|---|
| EE-37 | Harjumaa | Harju |
| EE-39 | Hiiumaa | Hiiu |
| EE-45 | Ida-Virumaa | Ida-Viru |
| EE-50 | Jõgevamaa | Jõgeva |
| EE-52 | Järvamaa | Järva |
| EE-60 | Lääne-Virumaa | Lääne-Viru |
| EE-56 | Läänemaa | Lääne |
| EE-64 | Põlvamaa | Põlva |
| EE-68 | Pärnumaa | Pärnu |
| EE-71 | Raplamaa | Rapla |
| EE-74 | Saaremaa | Saare |
| EE-79 | Tartumaa | Tartu |
| EE-81 | Valgamaa | Valga |
| EE-84 | Viljandimaa | Viljandi |
| EE-87 | Võrumaa | Võru |

=== Municipalities ===
| Code | Subdivision name (et) | Category | County |
|---|---|---|---|
| EE-130 | Alutaguse | rural municipality | 45 |
| EE-141 | Anija | rural municipality | 37 |
| EE-142 | Antsla | rural municipality | 87 |
| EE-171 | Elva | rural municipality | 79 |
| EE-184 | Haapsalu | urban municipality | 56 |
| EE-191 | Haljala | rural municipality | 60 |
| EE-198 | Harku | rural municipality | 37 |
| EE-205 | Hiiumaa | rural municipality | 39 |
| EE-214 | Häädemeeste | rural municipality | 68 |
| EE-245 | Jõelähtme | rural municipality | 37 |
| EE-247 | Jõgeva | rural municipality | 50 |
| EE-251 | Jõhvi | rural municipality | 45 |
| EE-255 | Järva | rural municipality | 52 |
| EE-272 | Kadrina | rural municipality | 60 |
| EE-283 | Kambja | rural municipality | 79 |
| EE-284 | Kanepi | rural municipality | 64 |
| EE-291 | Kastre | rural municipality | 79 |
| EE-293 | Kehtna | rural municipality | 71 |
| EE-296 | Keila | urban municipality | 37 |
| EE-303 | Kihnu | rural municipality | 68 |
| EE-305 | Kiili | rural municipality | 37 |
| EE-317 | Kohila | rural municipality | 71 |
| EE-321 | Kohtla-Järve | urban municipality | 45 |
| EE-338 | Kose | rural municipality | 37 |
| EE-353 | Kuusalu | rural municipality | 37 |
| EE-424 | Loksa | urban municipality | 37 |
| EE-432 | Luunja | rural municipality | 79 |
| EE-431 | Lääne-Harju | rural municipality | 37 |
| EE-441 | Lääne-Nigula | rural municipality | 56 |
| EE-430 | Lääneranna | rural municipality | 68 |
| EE-442 | Lüganuse | rural municipality | 45 |
| EE-446 | Maardu | urban municipality | 37 |
| EE-478 | Muhu | rural municipality | 74 |
| EE-480 | Mulgi | rural municipality | 84 |
| EE-486 | Mustvee | rural municipality | 50 |
| EE-503 | Märjamaa | rural municipality | 71 |
| EE-511 | Narva | urban municipality | 45 |
| EE-514 | Narva-Jõesuu | urban municipality | 45 |
| EE-528 | Nõo | rural municipality | 79 |
| EE-557 | Otepää | rural municipality | 81 |
| EE-567 | Paide | urban municipality | 52 |
| EE-586 | Peipsiääre | rural municipality | 79 |
| EE-638 | Põhja-Pärnumaa | rural municipality | 68 |
| EE-615 | Põhja-Sakala | rural municipality | 84 |
| EE-618 | Põltsamaa | rural municipality | 50 |
| EE-622 | Põlva | rural municipality | 64 |
| EE-624 | Pärnu | urban municipality | 68 |
| EE-651 | Raasiku | rural municipality | 37 |
| EE-653 | Rae | rural municipality | 37 |
| EE-661 | Rakvere | rural municipality | 60 |
| EE-663 | Rakvere | urban municipality | 60 |
| EE-668 | Rapla | rural municipality | 71 |
| EE-689 | Ruhnu | rural municipality | 74 |
| EE-698 | Rõuge | rural municipality | 87 |
| EE-708 | Räpina | rural municipality | 64 |
| EE-712 | Saarde | rural municipality | 68 |
| EE-714 | Saaremaa | rural municipality | 74 |
| EE-719 | Saku | rural municipality | 37 |
| EE-726 | Saue | rural municipality | 37 |
| EE-732 | Setomaa | rural municipality | 87 |
| EE-735 | Sillamäe | urban municipality | 45 |
| EE-784 | Tallinn | urban municipality | 37 |
| EE-792 | Tapa | rural municipality | 60 |
| EE-796 | Tartu | rural municipality | 79 |
| EE-793 | Tartu | urban municipality | 79 |
| EE-803 | Toila | rural municipality | 45 |
| EE-809 | Tori | rural municipality | 68 |
| EE-824 | Tõrva | rural municipality | 81 |
| EE-834 | Türi | rural municipality | 52 |
| EE-855 | Valga | rural municipality | 81 |
| EE-890 | Viimsi | rural municipality | 37 |
| EE-899 | Viljandi | rural municipality | 84 |
| EE-897 | Viljandi | urban municipality | 84 |
| EE-901 | Vinni | rural municipality | 60 |
| EE-903 | Viru-Nigula | rural municipality | 60 |
| EE-907 | Vormsi | rural municipality | 56 |
| EE-917 | Võru | rural municipality | 87 |
| EE-919 | Võru | urban municipality | 87 |
| EE-928 | Väike-Maarja | rural municipality | 60 |

== Changes ==
The following changes to the entry are listed on ISO's online catalogue, the Online Browsing Platform:

| Effective date of change | Short description of change (en) |
|---|---|
| 2020-11-24 | Addition of category urban municipality, rural municipality; Addition of urban municipality EE-184, EE-296, EE-321, EE-424, EE-446, EE-511, EE-514, EE-567, EE-624, EE-663, EE-735, EE-784, EE-793, EE-897, EE-919; Addition of rural municipality EE-130, EE-141, EE-142, EE-171, EE-191, EE-198, EE-205, EE-214, EE-245, EE-247, EE-251, EE-255, EE-272, EE-283, EE-284, EE-291, EE-293, EE-303, EE-305, EE-317, EE-338, EE-353, EE-430, EE-431, EE-432, EE-441, EE-442, EE-478, EE-480, EE-486, EE-503, EE-528, EE-557, EE-586, EE-615, EE-618, EE-622, EE-638, EE-651, EE-653, EE-661, EE-668, EE-689, EE-698, EE-708, EE-712, EE-714, EE-719, EE-726, EE-732, EE-792, EE-796, EE-803, EE-809, EE-824, EE-834, EE-855, EE-890, EE-899, EE-901, EE-903, EE-907, EE-917, EE-928; Change of subdivision code from EE-44 to EE-45, EE-49 to EE-50, EE-51 to EE-52, EE-57 to EE-56, EE-59 to EE-60, EE-65 to EE-64, EE-67 to EE-68, EE-70 to EE-71, EE-78 to EE-79, EE-82 to EE-81, EE-86 to EE-87; Update List Source |

== See also ==
- Subdivisions of Estonia
- FIPS region codes of Estonia
- NUTS codes of Estonia
- Neighbouring countries: LV, RU
