= Administrative divisions of Estonia =

Estonia is a unitary country with a single-tier local government system. Local affairs are managed autonomously by local governments. There are 78 municipalities from 28 November 2025. Two rural municipalities merged in Ida-Virumaa County to form (the new) Jõhvi Parish.

Since administrative reform in 2017, there were in total 79 local governments, including 15 towns and 64 rural municipalities. From 28 November 2025 there are 63 rural municipalities and 15 towns. All municipalities have equal legal status and form part of a county, which is a state administrative unit. Representative body of local authorities is municipal council, elected at general direct elections for a four-year term. The council appoints local government, headed by a mayor. For additional decentralization the local authorities may form municipal districts with limited authority, currently those have been formed in Tallinn and Hiiumaa.

Separately from administrative units there are also settlement units: village, small borough, borough, and town. Generally villages have less than 300, small borough have between 300 and 1000, borough and town have over 1000 inhabitants.

Database which consists of info about Estonian administrative units and settlements, is called EHAK (abbreviation for Estonian Eesti haldus- ja asustusjaotuse klassifikaator).

== Counties ==
Counties of Estonia

- Harju County
- Hiiu County
- Ida-Viru County
- Jõgeva County
- Järva County
- Lääne County
- Lääne-Viru County
- Põlva County
- Pärnu County
- Rapla County
- Saare County
- Tartu County
- Valga County
- Viljandi County
- Võru County

== Parishes or municipalities ==
Administrative divisions of Estonia

Harju County

- Anija Parish
- Harku Parish
- Jõelähtme Parish
- Keila (urban municipality)
- Kiili Parish
- Kose Parish
- Kuusalu Parish
- Loksa (urban municipality)
- Lääne-Harju Parish
- Maardu (urban municipality)
- Raasiku Parish
- Rae Parish
- Saku Parish
- Saue Parish
- Tallinn (urban municipality, capital)
- Viimsi Parish

Hiiu County

- Hiiumaa Parish

Ida-Viru County

- Alutaguse Parish
- Jõhvi Parish
- Kohtla-Järve (urban municipality)
- Lüganuse Parish
- Narva (urban municipality)
- Narva-Jõesuu (urban municipality)
- Sillamäe (urban municipality)

Jõgeva County

- Jõgeva Parish
- Mustvee Parish
- Põltsamaa Parish

Järva County

- Järva Parish
- Paide (urban municipality)
- Türi Parish

Lääne County

- Haapsalu (urban municipality)
- Lääne-Nigula Parish
- Vormsi Parish

Lääne-Viru County

- Haljala Parish
- Kadrina Parish
- Rakvere (urban municipality)
- Rakvere Parish
- Tapa Parish
- Vinni Parish
- Viru-Nigula Parish
- Väike-Maarja Parish

Põlva County

- Kanepi Parish
- Põlva Parish
- Räpina Parish

Pärnu County

- Häädemeeste Parish
- Kihnu Parish
- Lääneranna Parish
- Põhja-Pärnumaa Parish
- Pärnu (urban municipality)
- Saarde Parish
- Tori Parish

Rapla County

- Kehtna Parish
- Kohila Parish
- Märjamaa Parish
- Rapla Parish

Saare County

- Saaremaa Parish
- Muhu Parish
- Ruhnu Parish

Tartu County

- Elva Parish
- Kambja Parish
- Kastre Parish
- Luunja Parish
- Nõo Parish
- Peipsiääre Parish
- Tartu (urban municipality)
- Tartu Parish

Valga County

- Otepää Parish
- Tõrva Parish
- Valga Parish

Viljandi County

- Mulgi Parish
- Põhja-Sakala Parish
- Viljandi (urban municipality)
- Viljandi Parish

Võru County

- Antsla Parish
- Rõuge Parish
- Setomaa Parish
- Võru (urban municipality)
- Võru Parish

== See also ==
- Boroughs of Estonia
- Populated places in Estonia
