= Populated places in Estonia =

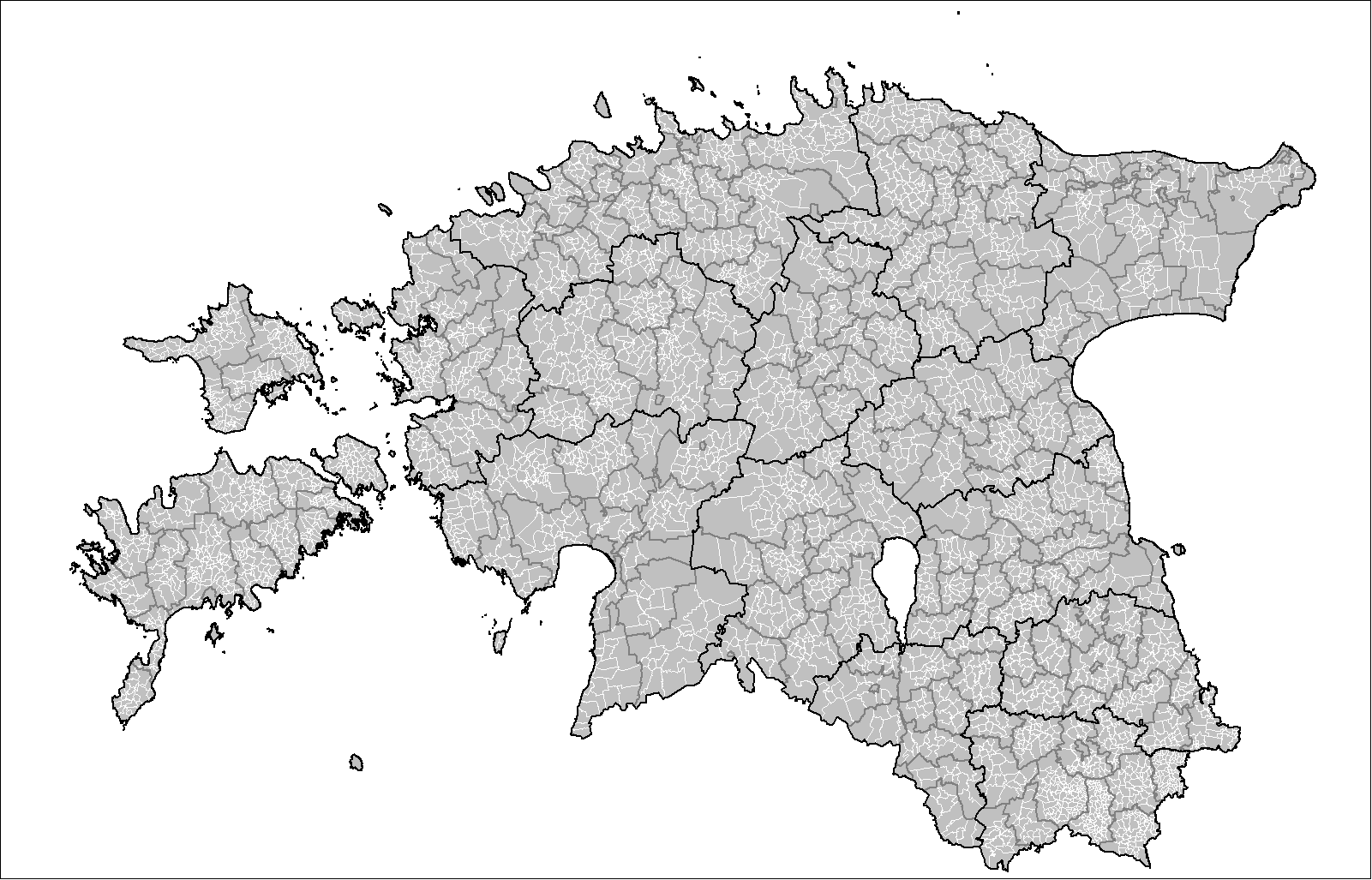
Populated places in Estonia

Populated places in Estonia are cities or settlement units (Note: Estonian: asustusüksus) of rural municipalities, but only cities have administrative functions. Settlement units are divided into settlements (Note: Estonian: asula) and urban regions (Note: Estonian: asum) (subdivisions of cities).

Officially there are four types of settlement unit in Estonia:

- village (küla) – a sparsely populated settlement or a densely populated settlement with fewer than 300 permanent inhabitants
- small borough (alevik) – a densely populated settlement with at least 300 permanent inhabitants
- town (alev) – a densely populated settlement with at least 1000 permanent inhabitants
- city (linn) - a densely populated settlement with at least 1000 permanent inhabitants.

As of 2024, there were 47 cities, 13 towns, 186 hamlets and 4457 villages in Estonia. There were 3 cities with under 1000 permanent inhabitants as of 2023.

== See also ==
- Municipalities of Estonia
- List of cities and towns in Estonia
- Counties of Estonia
