= Haaslava Parish =

Former municipality of Estonia

Coordinates: 58°19′N 26°50′E

Haaslava Parish Haaslava vald
- Former municipality of Estonia
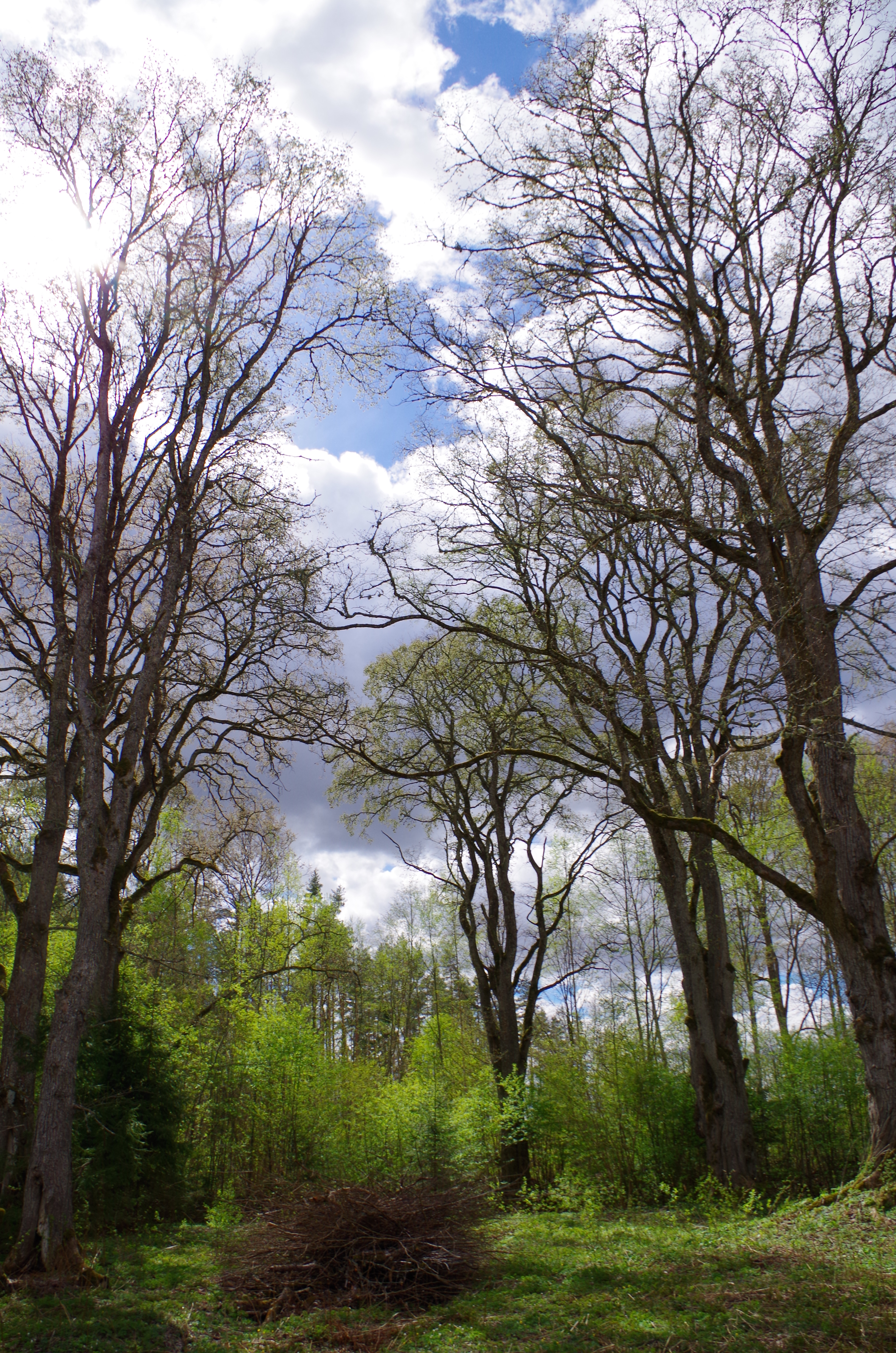

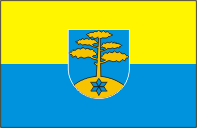
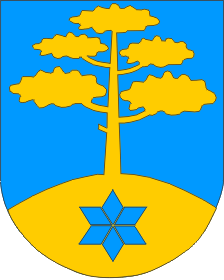
- Flag Coat of arms

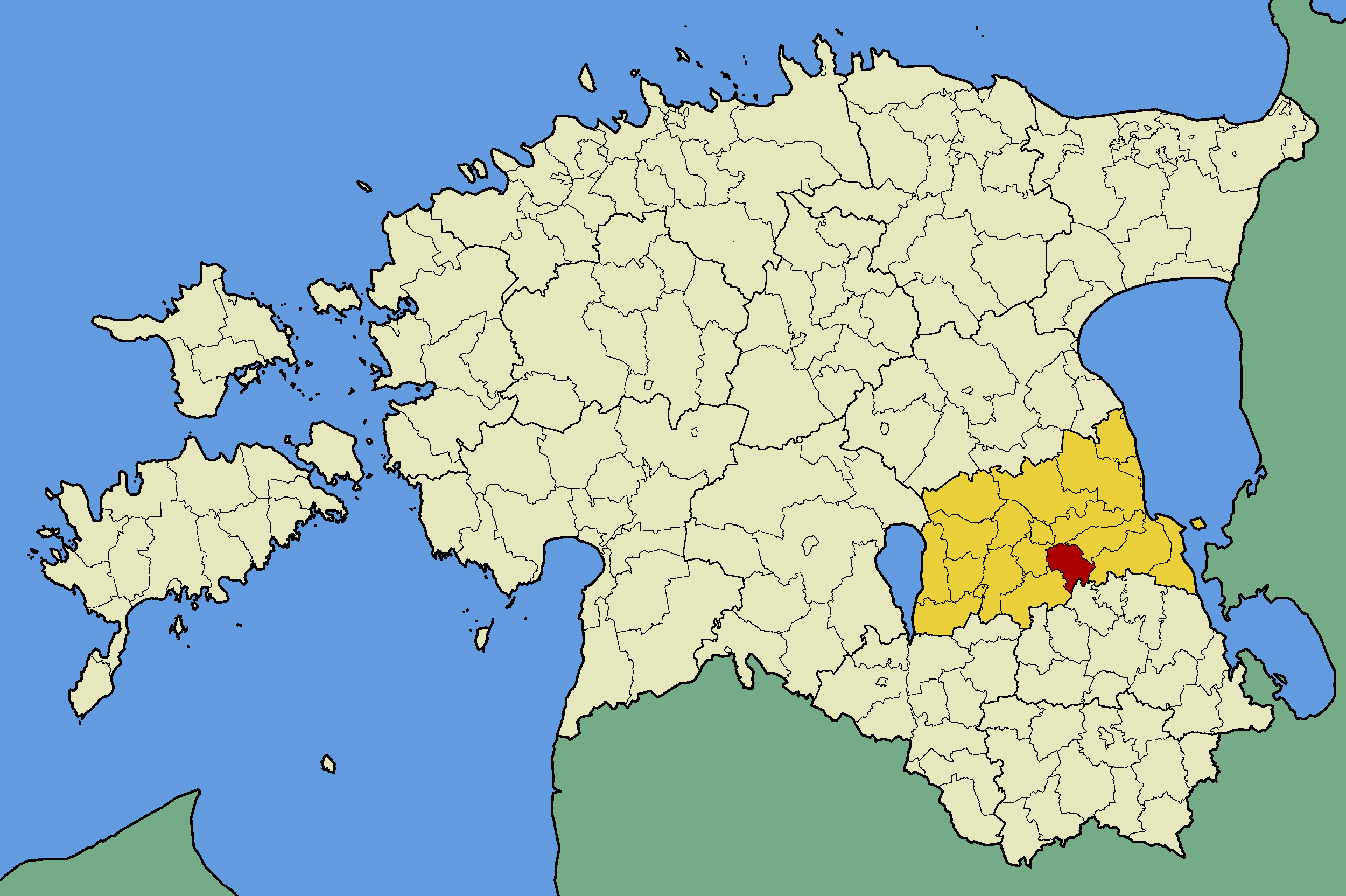
- Haaslava Parish within Tartu County.
- Country: Estonia
- County: Tartu County
- Administrative centre: Kurepalu

Haaslava Parish was a rural municipality in Tartu County (Estonia), located southeast from the city of Tartu.

Administrative center was in Kurepalu village.

From the north the parish was bordered by river Emajõgi. From southwest by Tartu–Pechory railway line.

In 2017 the parish was merged into Kastre Parish.

== Settlements ==
Small borough

Roiu

Villages

Aadami - Aardla - Aardlapalu - Alaküla - Haaslava - Igevere - Ignase - Kitseküla - Kõivuküla - Koke - Kriimani - Kurepalu - Lange - Metsanurga - Mõra - Päkste - Paluküla - Tõõraste - Uniküla

== Gallery ==
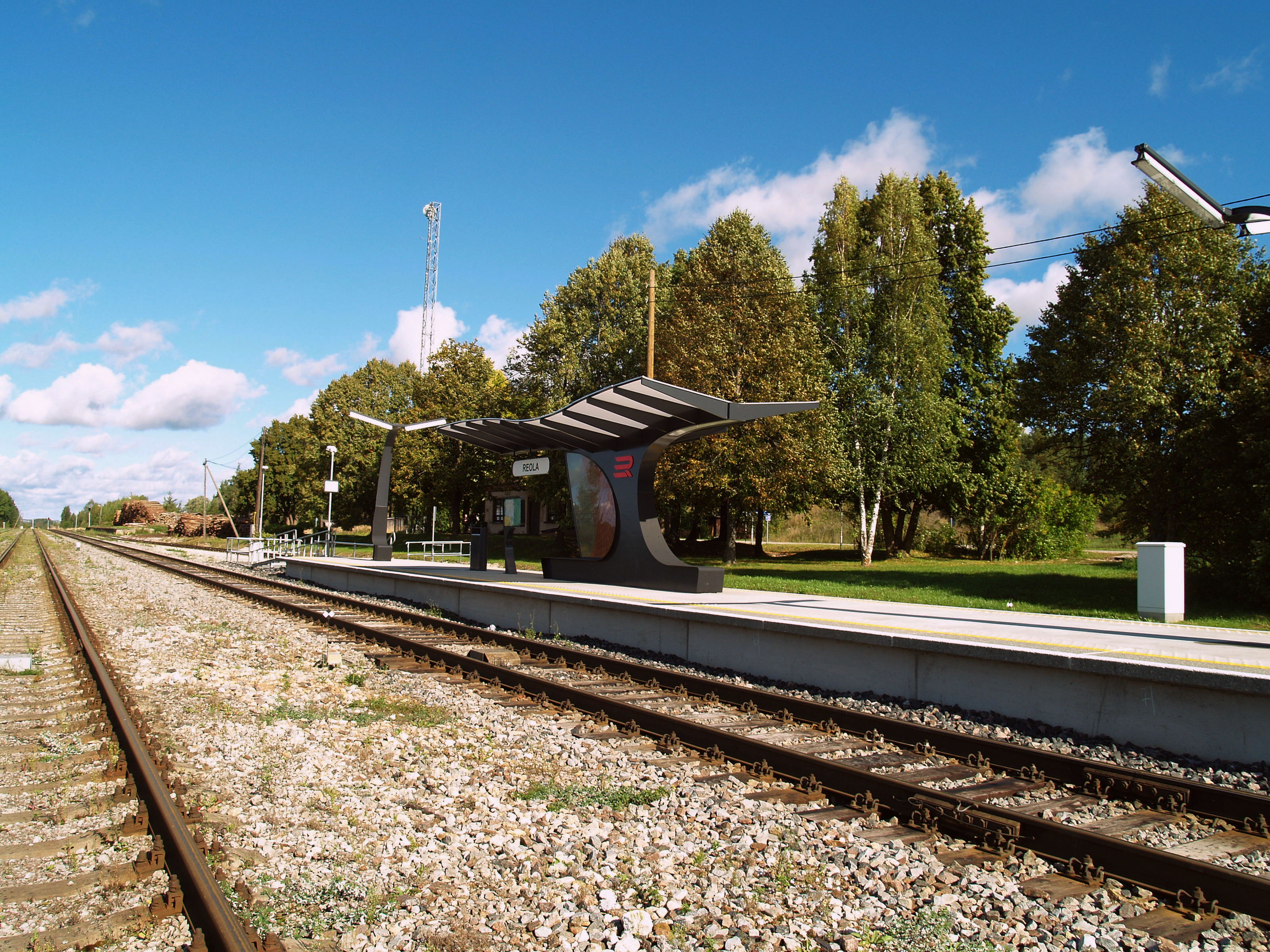
Reola railway station

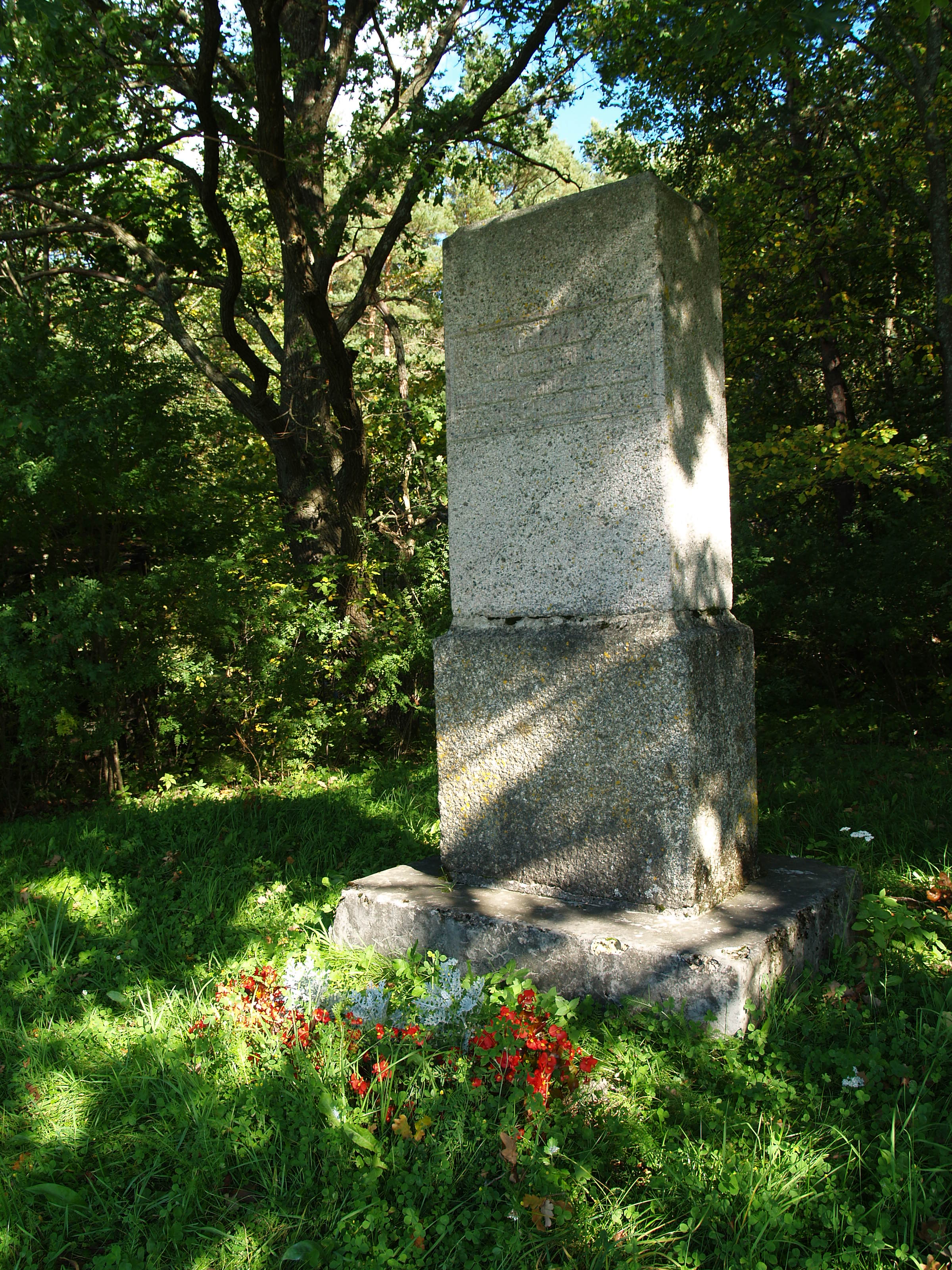
Monument to Reola battle in the Estonian War of Independence

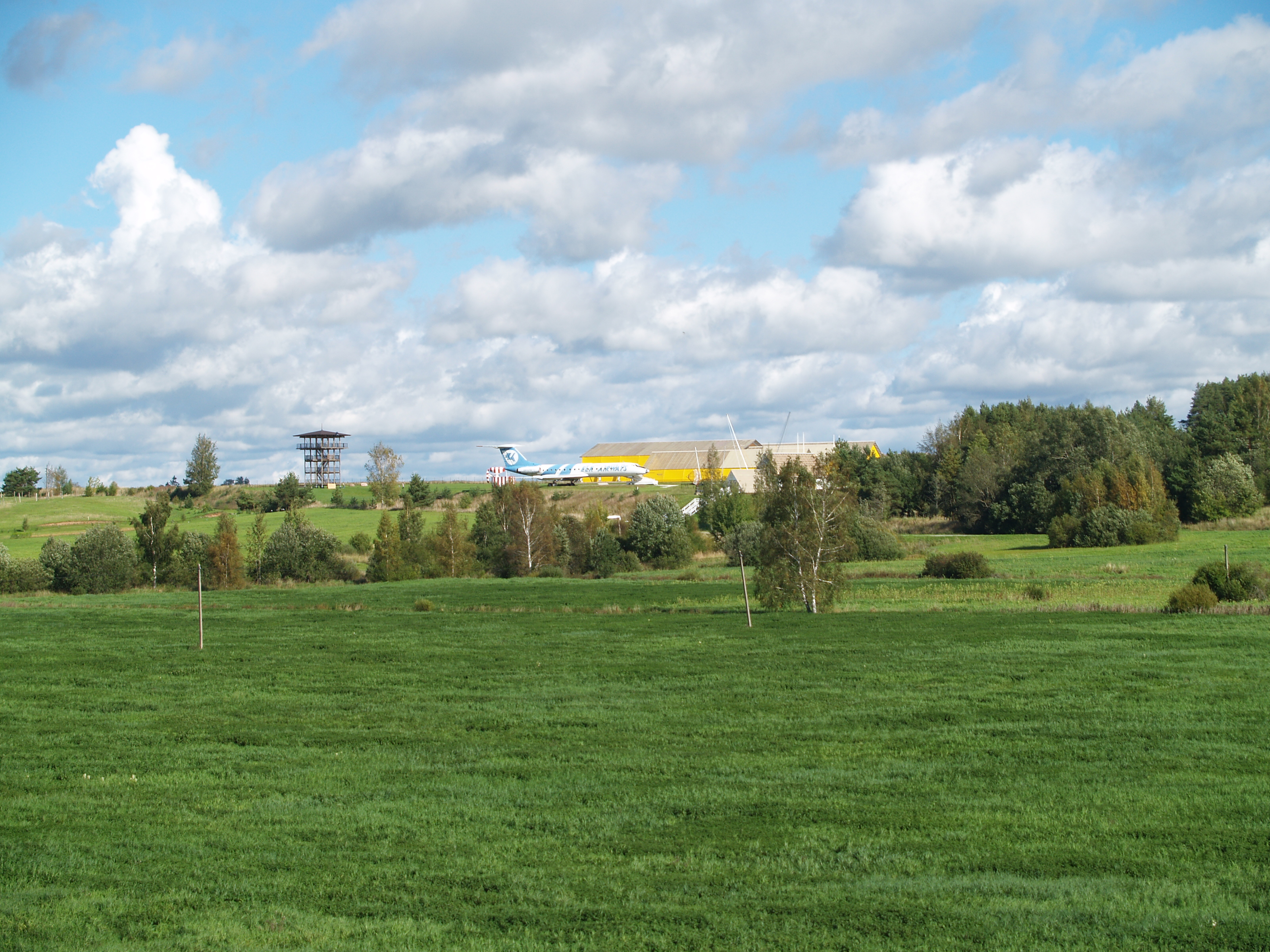
Estonian Aviation Museum in Lange village

== Twinnings ==
- Leivonmäki, Finland
