= Mäksa Parish =

Former municipality of Estonia

Coordinates: 58°20′N 26°59′E

Mäksa Parish Mäksa vald
- Former municipality of Estonia
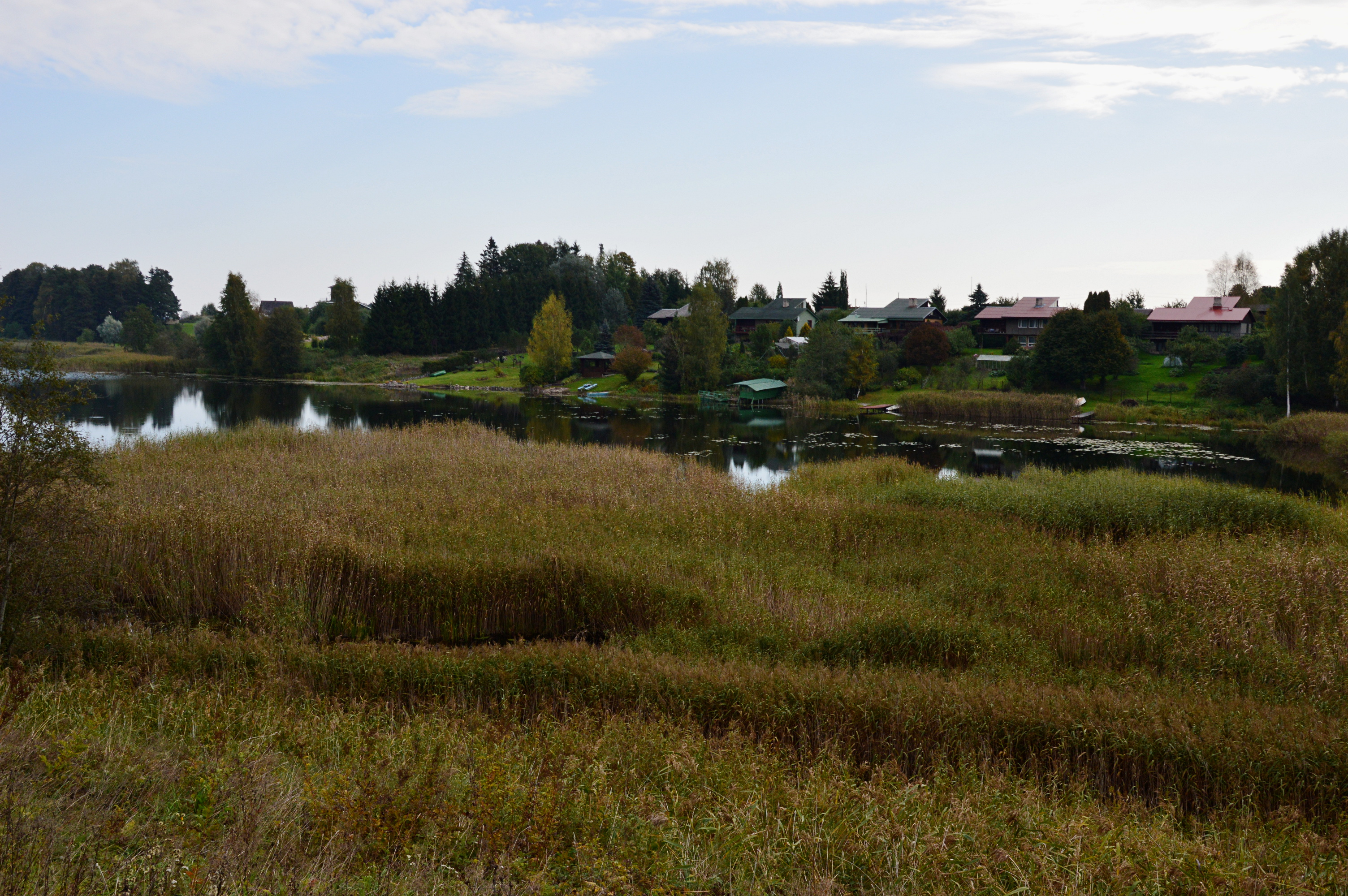
- Lavatsi lake conservation area

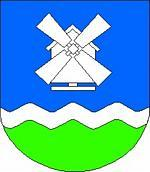
- Flag Coat of arms

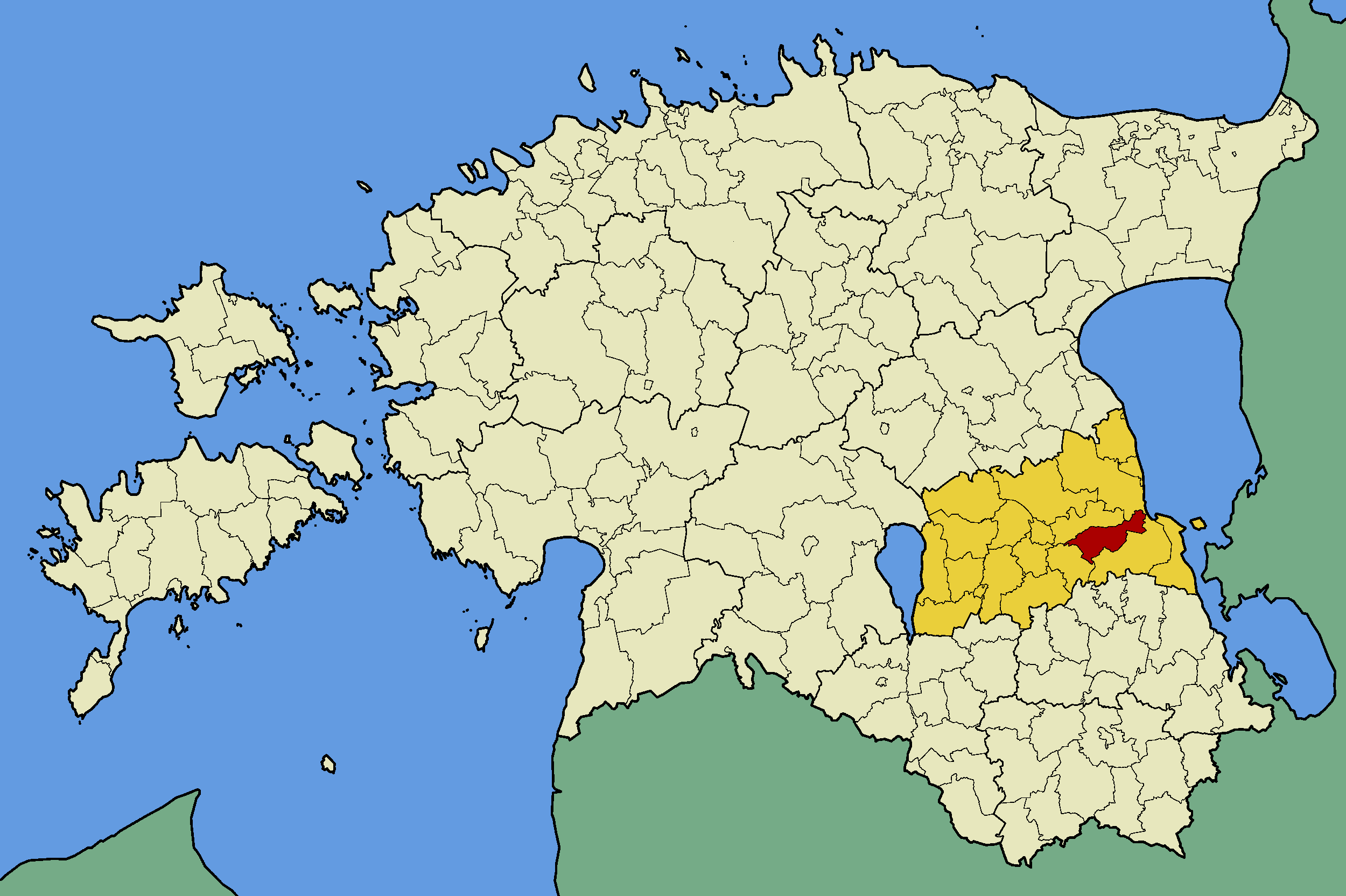
- Mäksa Parish within Tartu County.
- Country: Estonia
- County: Tartu County
- Administrative centre: Melliste
- Website: www.maksavald.ee

Mäksa Parish was a rural municipality in Tartu County, Estonia.

== Settlements ==
Villages

Aruaia - Kaagvere - Kaarlimõisa - Kastre - Mäksa - Mäletjärve - Melliste - Poka - Sarakuste - Sudaste - Tammevaldma - Tigase - Vana-Kastre - Veskimäe - Võõpste - Võruküla

== Twinnings ==
- Kannonkoski Municipality, Finland

== See also ==
- Lake Agali
