= List of Estonian records in Olympic weightlifting =

The following are the national records in Olympic weightlifting in Estonia. Records are maintained in each weight class for the snatch lift, the clean and jerk lift, and the total for both lifts by the Estonian Weightlifting Federation (ETL).

== Current records ==
Key to tables: Awaiting ratification Not ratified or later rescinded by ETL

=== Men ===
Event	Record	Athlete	Date	Meet	Place	Ref
60 kg
Snatch	98 kg	Standard				
Clean & Jerk	117 kg	Standard				
Total	215 kg	Standard				
65 kg
Snatch	109 kg	Standard				
Clean & Jerk	135 kg	Standard				
Total	243 kg	Standard				
70 kg
Snatch	113 kg	Standard				
Clean & Jerk	140 kg	Standard				
Total	248 kg	Standard				
75 kg
Snatch	116 kg	Standard				
Clean & Jerk	144 kg	Standard				
Total	257 kg	Standard				
85 kg
Snatch	124 kg	Standard				
Clean & Jerk	150 kg	Standard				
Total	273 kg	Standard				
95 kg
Snatch	131 kg	Standard				
Clean & Jerk	162 kg	Aleksei Kuzmin	17 October 2026	European Junior Championships	Durrës, Albania	
Total	292 kg	Aleksei Kuzmin	17 October 2026	European Junior Championships	Durrës, Albania	
110 kg
Snatch	146 kg	Standard				
Clean & Jerk	172 kg	Standard				
Total	312 kg	Standard				
+110 kg
Snatch	160 kg	Standard				
Clean & Jerk	187 kg	Standard				
Total	346 kg	Standard				

=== Women ===
Event	Record	Athlete	Date	Meet	Place	Ref
49 kg
Snatch	62 kg	Standard				
Clean & Jerk	75 kg	Standard				
Total	134 kg	Standard				
53 kg
Snatch	66 kg	Standard				
Clean & Jerk	82 kg	Standard				
Total	148 kg	Standard				
57 kg
Snatch	72 kg	Standard				
Clean & Jerk	89 kg	Standard				
Total	160 kg	Standard				
61 kg
Snatch	75 kg	Standard				
Clean & Jerk	93 kg	Standard				
Total	167 kg	Standard				
69 kg
Snatch	84 kg	Standard				
Clean & Jerk	100 kg	Standard				
Total	184 kg	Standard				
77 kg
Snatch	86 kg	Standard				
Clean & Jerk	106 kg	Standard				
Total	192 kg	Standard				
86 kg
Snatch	100 kg	Eliise Peterson	24 April 2026	European Championships	Batumi, Georgia	
Clean & Jerk	118 kg	Eliise Peterson	24 April 2026	European Championships	Batumi, Georgia	
Total	218 kg	Eliise Peterson	24 April 2026	European Championships	Batumi, Georgia	
+86 kg
Snatch	90 kg	Standard				
Clean & Jerk	119 kg	Standard				
Total	207 kg	Standard				

== Historical records ==
=== Men (2025–2026) ===
Event	Record	Athlete	Date	Meet	Place	Ref
60 kg
Snatch	104 kg	Standard				
Clean & Jerk	125 kg	Standard				
Total	229 kg	Standard				
65 kg
Snatch	112 kg	Standard				
Clean & Jerk	136 kg	Standard				
Total	248 kg	Standard				
71 kg
Snatch	120 kg	Standard				
Clean & Jerk	148 kg	Standard				
Total	268 kg	Standard				
79 kg
Snatch	123 kg	Standard				
Clean & Jerk	151 kg	Standard				
Total	274 kg	Standard				
88 kg
Snatch	138 kg	Standard				
Clean & Jerk	175 kg	Leho Pent	14 June 2025		Albu, Estonia	
Total	308 kg	Standard				
94 kg
Snatch	142 kg	Standard				
Clean & Jerk	175 kg	Standard				
Total	317 kg	Standard				
110 kg
Snatch	150 kg	Standard				
Clean & Jerk	184 kg	Standard				
Total	334 kg	Standard				
+110 kg
Snatch	171 kg	Standard				
Clean & Jerk	200 kg	Standard				
Total	371 kg	Standard				

=== Men (2018–2025) ===
Event	Record	Athlete	Date	Meet	Place	Ref
55 kg
Snatch	92 kg	Standard				
Clean & Jerk	113 kg	Standard				
Total	205 kg	Standard				
61 kg
Snatch	104 kg	Standard				
Clean & Jerk	127 kg	Standard				
Total	231 kg	Standard				
67 kg
Snatch	113 kg	Standard				
Clean & Jerk	139 kg	Standard				
Total	252 kg	Standard				
73 kg
Snatch	120 kg	Standard				
Clean & Jerk	148 kg	Standard				
Total	268 kg	Standard				
81 kg
Snatch	139 kg	Alexander Moiseenko	12 March 2022		Melliste, Estonia	
Clean & Jerk	160 kg	Alexander Moiseenko	27 February 2021		Tartu, Estonia	
Total	295 kg	Alexander Moiseenko	12 March 2022		Melliste, Estonia	
89 kg
Snatch	150 kg	Leho Pent	10 September 2023	World Championships	Riyadh, Saudi Arabia	
Clean & Jerk	183 kg	Leho Pent	10 December 2023 (Note: by official time table; 4 December 2023 by ETL source, a typo)	IWF Grand Prix II	Doha, Qatar	
Total	323 kg	Leho Pent	10 September 2023	World Championships	Riyadh, Saudi Arabia	
96 kg
Snatch	155 kg	Leho Pent	30 October 2021		Melliste, Estonia	
Clean & Jerk	190 kg	Leho Pent	30 October 2021		Melliste, Estonia	
Total	345 kg	Leho Pent	30 October 2021		Melliste, Estonia	
102 kg
Snatch	156 kg	Leho Pent	25 September 2019	World Championships	Pattaya, Thailand	
Clean & Jerk	190 kg	Leho Pent	25 September 2019	World Championships	Pattaya, Thailand	
Total	346 kg	Leho Pent	25 September 2019	World Championships	Pattaya, Thailand	
109 kg
Snatch	155 kg	Leho Pent	5 December 2020		Albu, Estonia	
Clean & Jerk	192 kg	Leho Pent	5 December 2020		Albu, Estonia	
Total	347 kg	Leho Pent	5 December 2020		Albu, Estonia	
+109 kg
Snatch	192 kg	Mart Seim	10 November 2018	World Championships	Ashgabat, Turkmenistan	
Clean & Jerk	235 kg	Mart Seim	10 November 2018	World Championships	Ashgabat, Turkmenistan	
Total	427 kg	Mart Seim	10 November 2018	World Championships	Ashgabat, Turkmenistan	

=== Men (1998–2018) ===
Event	Record	Athlete	Date	Meet	Place	Ref
56 kg
Snatch	88 kg	Vadim Goldberg	29 October 2011		Melliste, Estonia	
Clean & Jerk	108 kg	Vadim Goldberg	29 October 2011		Melliste, Estonia	
Total	196 kg	Vadim Goldberg	29 October 2011		Melliste, Estonia	
62 kg
Snatch	102 kg	Sergei Rumjantsev	22 May 2004		Sindi, Estonia	
Clean & Jerk	131 kg	David Tuhkanen	3 April 2004		Tapa, Estonia	
Total	227 kg	David Tuhkanen	25 May 2002		Sindi, Estonia	
69 kg
Snatch	122 kg	Sergei Rumjantsev	7 June 2007		Valga, Estonia	
Clean & Jerk	150 kg	David Tuhkanen	11 March 2006		Rakvere, Estonia	
Total	263 kg	Sergei Rumjantsev	7 June 2007		Valga, Estonia	
77 kg
Snatch	140 kg	Sergei Rumjantsev	10 March 2007		Tartu, Estonia	
Clean & Jerk	165 kg	Mikk Kasemaa	17 November 2001		Tõrva, Estonia	
Total	300 kg	Sergei Rumjantsev	10 March 2007		Tartu, Estonia	
85 kg
Snatch	152 kg	Leho Pent	16 August 2011	Universiade	Shenzhen, China	
Clean & Jerk	191 kg	Mikk Kasemaa	15 October 2005		Mõisaküla, Estonia	
Total	342 kg	Mikk Kasemaa	15 October 2005		Mõisaküla, Estonia	
94 kg
Snatch	170 kg	Andrus Utsar	19 April 2003	European Championships	Loutraki, Greece	
Clean & Jerk	197 kg	Andrus Utsar	26 April 2002	European Championships	Antalya, Turkey	
Total	362 kg	Andrus Utsar	13 October 2001		Ciechanów, Poland	
105 kg
Snatch	175 kg	Andrus Utsar	16 March 2002		Pärnu, Estonia	
Clean & Jerk	210 kg	Andrus Utsar	30 October 2004		Kõrveküla, Estonia	
Total	380 kg	Andrus Utsar	25 September 2004		Pärnu, Estonia	
+105 kg
Snatch	191 kg	Mart Seim	5 December 2017	World Championships	Anaheim, United States	
Clean & Jerk	253 kg	Mart Seim	5 December 2017	World Championships	Anaheim, United States	
Total	444 kg	Mart Seim	5 December 2017	World Championships	Anaheim, United States	

=== Women (2025–2026) ===
Event	Record	Athlete	Date	Meet	Place	Ref
48 kg
Snatch	70 kg	Standard				
Clean & Jerk	86 kg	Standard				
Total	156 kg	Standard				
53 kg
Snatch	74 kg	Standard				
Clean & Jerk	92 kg	Standard				
Total	166 kg	Standard				
58 kg
Snatch	80 kg	Standard				
Clean & Jerk	98 kg	Standard				
Total	178 kg	Standard				
63 kg
Snatch	86 kg	Standard				
Clean & Jerk	103 kg	Standard				
Total	189 kg	Standard				
69 kg
Snatch	90 kg	Standard				
Clean & Jerk	106 kg	Standard				
Total	196 kg	Standard				
77 kg
Snatch	92 kg	Standard				
Clean & Jerk	113 kg	Standard				
Total	205 kg	Standard				
86 kg
Snatch	100 kg	Eliise Peterson	24 April 2026	European Championships	Batumi, Georgia	
Clean & Jerk	120 kg	Standard				
Total	218 kg	Eliise Peterson	24 April 2026	European Championships	Batumi, Georgia	
+86 kg
Snatch	95 kg	Standard				
Clean & Jerk	124 kg	Standard				
Total	219 kg	Standard				

=== Women (2018–2025) ===
Event	Record	Athlete	Date	Meet	Place	Ref
45 kg
Snatch	56 kg	Standard				
Clean & Jerk	70 kg	Standard				
Total	126 kg	Standard				
49 kg
Snatch	61 kg	Standard				
Clean & Jerk	76 kg	Standard				
Total	137 kg	Standard				
55 kg
Snatch	70 kg	Angelina Matjuhhina	10 August 2019		Tartu, Estonia	
Clean & Jerk	93 kg	Angelina Matjuhhina	21 November 2020		Albu, Estonia	
Total	160 kg	Angelina Matjuhhina	10 August 2019		Tartu, Estonia	
59 kg
Snatch	69 kg	Angelina Matjuhhina	29 June 2019	European Union Cup	Waterford, Ireland	
Clean & Jerk	92 kg	Angelina Matjuhhina	9 November 2019		Valga, Estonia	
Total	160 kg	Angelina Matjuhhina	29 June 2019	European Union Cup	Waterford, Ireland	
64 kg
Snatch	75 kg	Standard				
Clean & Jerk	93 kg	Standard				
Total	168 kg	Standard				
71 kg
Snatch	83 kg	Triin Põdersoo	27 March 2021		Tartu, Estonia	
Clean & Jerk	106 kg	Triin Põdersoo	27 March 2021		Tartu, Estonia	
Total	189 kg	Triin Põdersoo	27 March 2021		Tartu, Estonia	
76 kg
Snatch	84 kg	Standard				
Clean & Jerk	105 kg	Standard				
Total	189 kg	Standard				
81 kg
Snatch	92 kg	Eliise Peterson	4 September 2021	Estonian Championships	Tartu, Estonia	
Clean & Jerk	110 kg	Eliise Peterson	4 September 2021	Estonian Championships	Tartu, Estonia	
Total	202 kg	Eliise Peterson	4 September 2021	Estonian Championships	Tartu, Estonia	
87 kg
Snatch	104 kg	Eliise Peterson	9 April 2024 (Note: by official result source; 31 March 2024 by ETL source, a typo)	World Cup	Phuket, Thailand	
Clean & Jerk	121 kg	Eliise Peterson	9 April 2024 (Note: by official result source; 31 March 2024 by ETL source, a typo)	World Cup	Phuket, Thailand	
Total	225 kg	Eliise Peterson	9 April 2024 (Note: by official result source; 31 March 2024 by ETL source, a typo)	World Cup	Phuket, Thailand	
+87 kg
Snatch	91 kg	Standard				
Clean & Jerk	114 kg	Standard				
Total	205 kg	Standard				

=== Women (1998–2018) ===
Event	Record	Athlete	Date	Meet	Place	Ref
48 kg
Snatch	47 kg	Angelina Matjuhhina	11 September 2016		Nowy Tomyśl, Poland	
Clean & Jerk	61 kg	Angelina Matjuhhina	24 September 2016		Tartu, Estonia	
Total	105 kg	Angelina Matjuhhina	16 July 2016		Albu, Estonia	
53 kg
Snatch	63 kg	Angelina Matjuhhina	19 May 2018		Sindi, Estonia	
Clean & Jerk	82 kg	Angelina Matjuhhina	19 May 2018		Sindi, Estonia	
Total	145 kg	Angelina Matjuhhina	19 May 2018		Sindi, Estonia	
58 kg
Snatch	65 kg	Angelina Matjuhhina	27 October 2018		Melliste, Estonia	
Clean & Jerk	85 kg	Angelina Matjuhhina	27 October 2018		Melliste, Estonia	
Total	150 kg	Angelina Matjuhhina	27 October 2018		Melliste, Estonia	
63 kg
Snatch	67 kg	Jevgenia Aleksejeva	28 February 2009		Kohtla-Järve, Estonia	
Clean & Jerk	85 kg	Ave Bombul	31 March 2012		Budapest, Hungary	
Total	146 kg	Ave Bombul	19 May 2012		Sindi, Estonia	
69 kg
Snatch	75 kg	Triin Põdersoo	30 June 2018		Albu, Estonia	
Clean & Jerk	92 kg	Triin Põdersoo	8 April 2017		Melliste, Estonia	
Total	165 kg	Triin Põdersoo	8 April 2017		Melliste, Estonia	
75 kg
Snatch	87 kg	Triin Põdersoo	26 December 2015		Dobele, Latvia	
Clean & Jerk	105 kg	Triin Põdersoo	5 March 2016		Melliste, Estonia	
Total	190 kg	Triin Põdersoo	5 March 2016		Melliste, Estonia	
90 kg
Snatch	91 kg	Triin Põdersoo	17 April 2015	European Championships	Tbilisi, Georgia	
Clean & Jerk	114 kg	Eliise Peterson	19 August 2017		Tartu, Estonia	
Total	203 kg	Triin Põdersoo	17 April 2015	European Championships	Tbilisi, Georgia	
+90 kg
Snatch	55 kg	Johanna Haljasorg	13 October 2018		Abja-Paluoja, Estonia	
Clean & Jerk	72 kg	Johanna Haljasorg	27 October 2018		Melliste, Estonia	
Total	126 kg	Johanna Haljasorg	13 October 2018		Abja-Paluoja, Estonia	
