= Paluküla =

Paluküla may refer to several places in Estonia:

- Paluküla, Hiiu County, village in Pühalepa Parish, Hiiu County
- Paluküla, Rapla County, village in Kehtna Parish, Rapla County
- Paluküla, Tartu County, village in Haaslava Parish, Tartu County
