= Kaarlimõisa =

Village in Estonia

Coordinates: 58°22′N 27°03′E

- Village
- Interactive map of Kaarlimõisa
- Country: Estonia
- County: Tartu County
- Parish: Kastre Parish

Population (2019)
  - Total: 69
- Time zone: UTC+2 (EET)
  - Summer (DST): UTC+3 (EEST)

Kaarlimõisa is a village in Kastre Parish, Tartu County in eastern Estonia. Prior to the 2017 administrative reform of Estonian municipalities, it was part of Mäksa Parish.

Kaarlimõisa's history as a populated place dates from the 18th-century, on the remains of the former Pungar farm in the former village of Kokuta of the Kastre manor cattle estate. The cattle estate had been developed already at the end of the 18th century, when it was acquired in 1790 by Baltic German landowner Carl Otto von Löwenstern, from which it is believed it takes its name (Kaarl from Carl, and mõisa meaning manor). Earlier recorded names for the estate included Karlsberg in 1826 and Carlseberg in 1847.

The village of Kaarlimõisa was officially established in the early 20th-century, following the Estonian War of Independence, during the interwar period. In 1939, the village name was recorded as Kaarli, and from 1977, Kaarlimõisa. In 1977, the village of Telliskivi was merged with Kaarlimõisa.
