= Koke =

Koke or KOKE may refer to:

== People ==
- Koke (footballer, born 1983), Spanish football forward Sergio Contreras Pardo
- Koke (footballer, born 1992), Spanish football midfielder Jorge Resurrección Merodio
- Koke (footballer, born 2000), Spanish football winger Jorge Saiz Colomer
- Koke Iglesias, Spanish football right-back Jorge Iglesias González (born 2005)
- Koke Vegas, Spanish football goalkeeper Jorge Ruiz Ojeda (born 1995)
- Semir Cerić Koke (born 1963), Bosnian folk singer

== Radio stations ==
- KOKE (AM), a radio station licensed to serve Pflugerville, Texas, United States
- KOKE-FM, a radio station licensed to serve Thorndale, Texas
- KOKE, the 1958–1991 callsign of KJCE, Rollingwood, Texas

== Other uses ==
- Kōke (or Koke), a hereditary position ranking below a daimyō in Japan during the Edo period
- Koke, Estonia, Tartu County, a village
- Koke language of Chad

== See also ==
- Kōkeʻe State Park, Hawaii, USA
- Kokey (disambiguation)
