= Uniküla =

Uniküla may refer to several places in Estonia:

- Uniküla, Ida-Viru County, village in Lüganuse Parish, Ida-Viru County
- Uniküla, Tartu County, village in Kastre Parish, Tartu County
- Uniküla, Valga County, village in Valga Parish, Valga County
