= Metsanurga =

Metsanurga may refer to several places in Estonia:

- Metsanurga, Saue Parish, village in Saue Parish, Harju County
- Metsanurga, Kiili Parish, village in Kiili Parish, Harju County
- Metsanurga, Lääne-Viru County, village in Haljala Parish, Lääne-Viru County
- Metsanurga, Kastre Parish, village in Kastre Parish, Tartu County
- Metsanurga, Peipsiääre Parish, village in Peipsiääre Parish, Tartu County
