= Rebase, Estonia =

Village in Estonia

Rebase
- Village
- Location in Estonia
- Coordinates: 58°14′N 26°48′E
- Country: Estonia
- County: Tartu County
- Parish: Kambja Parish
- Time zone: UTC+2 (EET)
  - Summer (DST): UTC+3 (EEST)

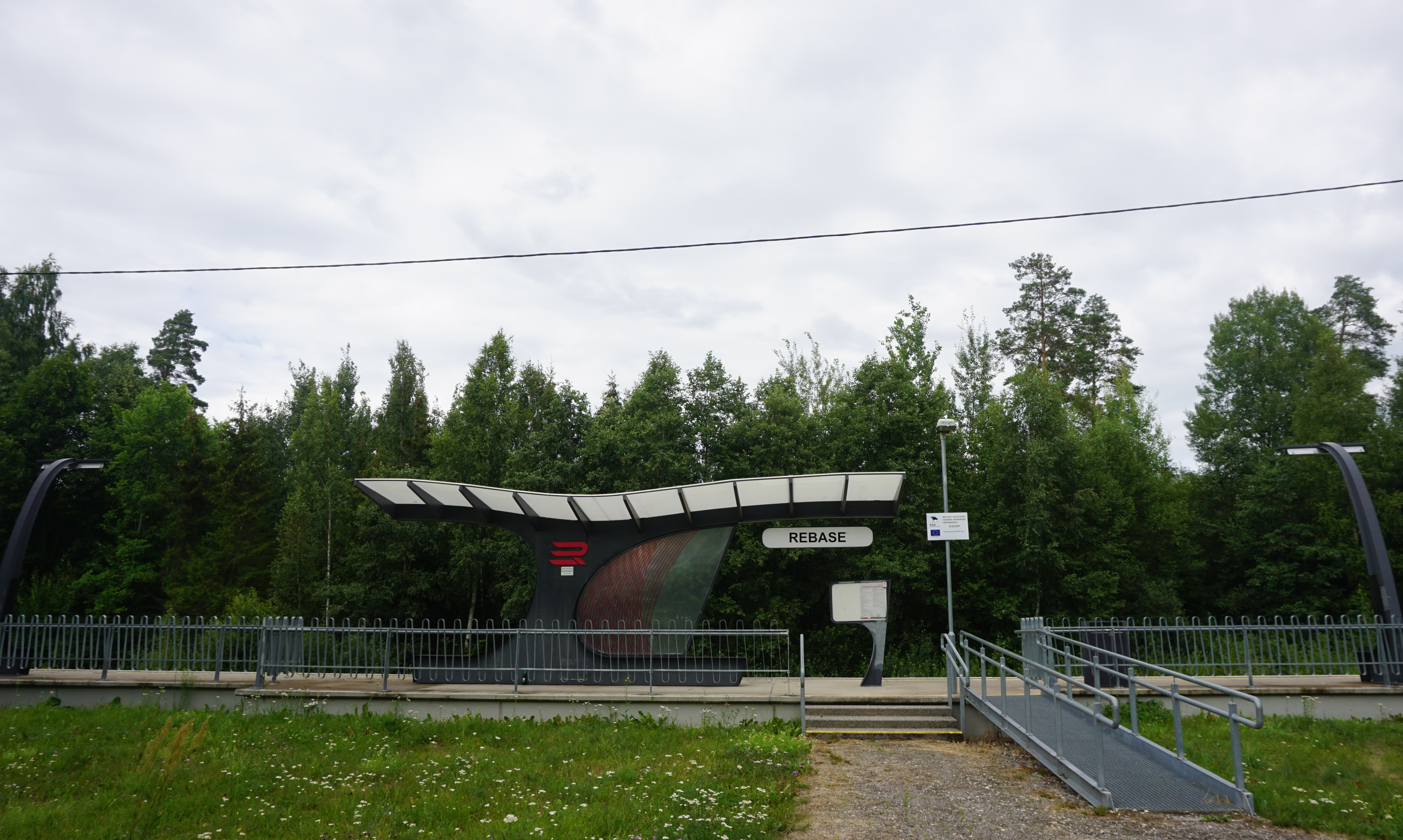
Rebase railway station

Rebase is a village in Kambja Parish, Tartu County in eastern Estonia.

Preceding station	Elron	Following station
Vana-Kuuste towards Tallinn	Tallinn–Tartu–Koidula	Vastse-Kuuste towards Koidula
