= Kalju Kangur =

Estonian writer and translator (1925–1989)

Kalju Kangur (25 October 1925 Vana-Kuuste, Tartu County – 15 January 1989) was an Estonian writer and translator. He is mostly known for his numerous Russian poetry translations into Estonian.

From 1939 to 1944, he studied at Hugo Treffner Gymnasium in Tartu. From 1955, he was a professional writer. From 1950s, he was a member of Estonian Writers' Union.

== Selected works ==
- 1957: poetry collection "Mööda jalgteid" ('Along the Footpaths')
- 1959: poetry collection "Üksainus rukkipea" ('One Single Ear of Rye')
- 1969: children book "Timbu-Limbu õukond ja lumemöldrid" ('The Court of Timbu-Limbu and the Snow-millers')
- 1979: children book "Unenäod kristallkohvris" ('Dreams in a Crystal Suitcase')
