= Kurepalu =

Village in Estonia

- Village
- Location within Estonia
- Coordinates: 58°19′N 26°50′E
- Country: Estonia
- County: Tartu County
- Parish: Kastre Parish
- Time zone: UTC+2 (EET)
  - Summer (DST): UTC+3 (EEST)

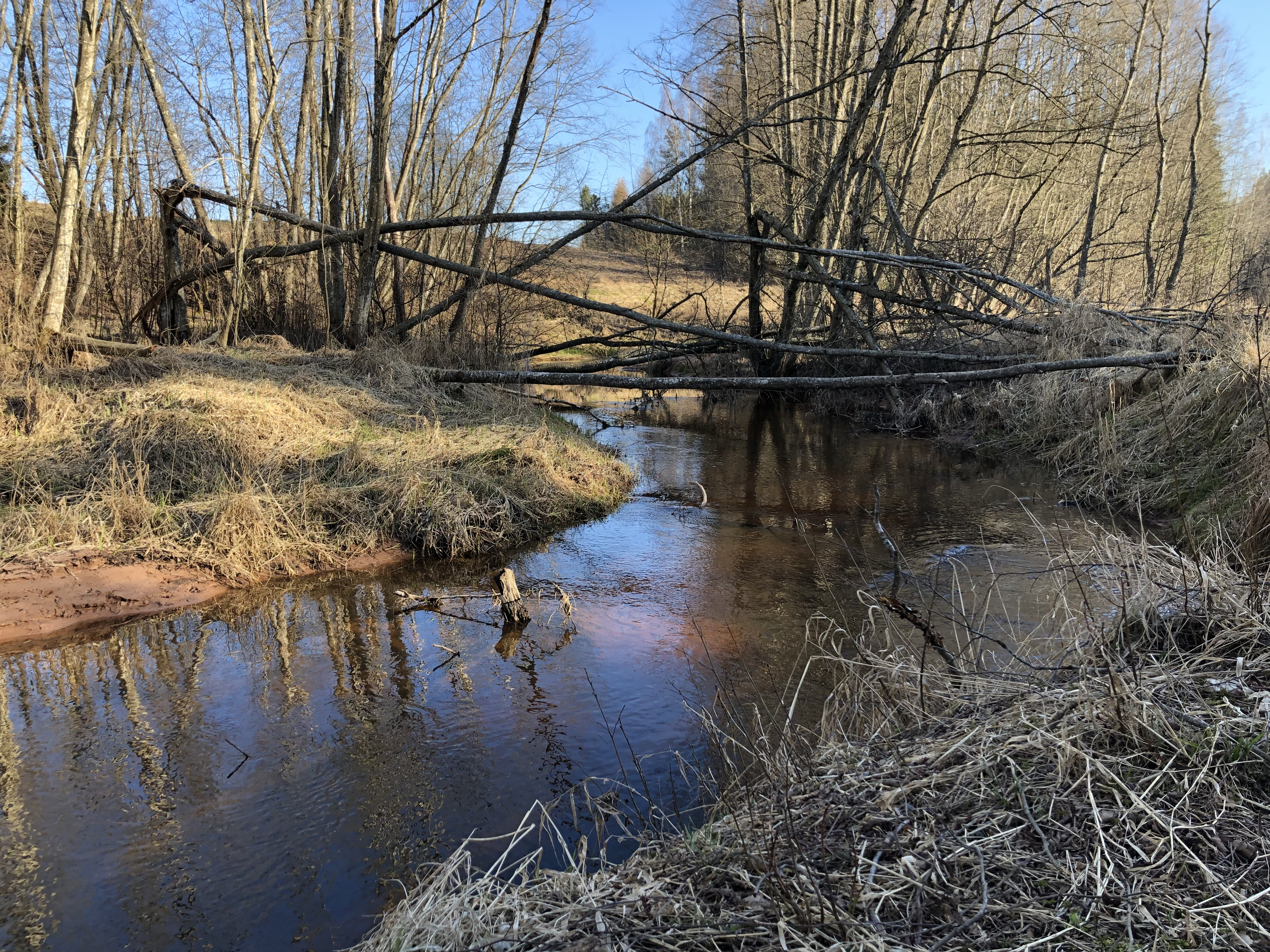
Mõra River between Kurepalu and Roiu, looking upstream

Kurepalu is a village in Kastre Parish, Tartu County in eastern Estonia.
