= Kitseküla, Tartu County =

Village in Estonia

Coordinates: 58°17′40″N 26°55′10″E

- Village
- Interactive map of Kitseküla, Tartu County
- Country: Estonia
- County: Tartu County
- Parish: Kastre Parish
- Time zone: UTC+2 (EET)
  - Summer (DST): UTC+3 (EEST)

Kitseküla is a village in Kastre Parish, Tartu County in eastern Estonia.
