= Kriimani =

Village in Estonia

- Village
- Interactive map of Kriimani
- Coordinates: 58°17′N 26°57′E
- Country: Estonia
- County: Tartu County
- Parish: Kastre Parish

Population (2011)
  - Total: 77
- Time zone: UTC+2 (EET)
  - Summer (DST): UTC+3 (EEST)

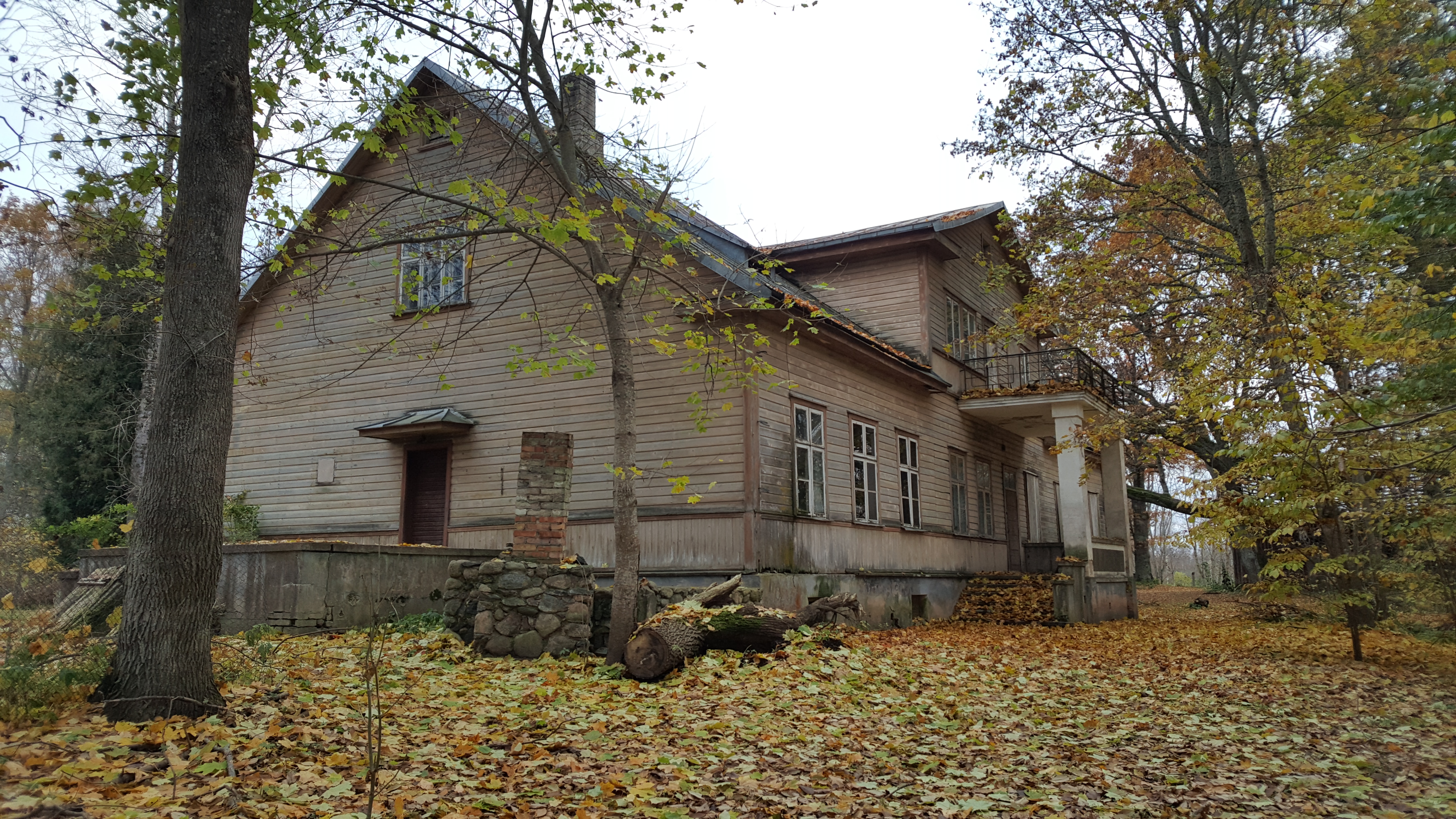
The main building of the Kriimani Manor, 2017

Kriimani is a village in Kastre Parish, Tartu County in eastern Estonia.
