= Uniküla, Tartu County =

Village in Estonia

Coordinates: 58°16′05″N 26°54′51″E

- Village
- Interactive map of Uniküla, Tartu County
- Country: Estonia
- County: Tartu County
- Parish: Kastre Parish
- Time zone: UTC+2 (EET)
  - Summer (DST): UTC+3 (EEST)

Uniküla is a village in Kastre Parish, Tartu County in eastern Estonia.

Until 2017 the village was in Haaslava Parish.
