= Päkste =

Village in Estonia

- Village
- Interactive map of Päkste
- Coordinates: 58°17′42″N 26°53′22″E
- Country: Estonia
- County: Tartu County
- Parish: Kastre Parish
- Time zone: UTC+2 (EET)
  - Summer (DST): UTC+3 (EEST)

Päkste is a village in Kastre Parish, Tartu County in eastern Estonia.
