= Sudaste =

Village in Estonia

Coordinates: 58°20′N 26°56′E

- Village
- Interactive map of Sudaste
- Country: Estonia
- County: Tartu County
- Parish: Kastre Parish
- Time zone: UTC+2 (EET)
  - Summer (DST): UTC+3 (EEST)

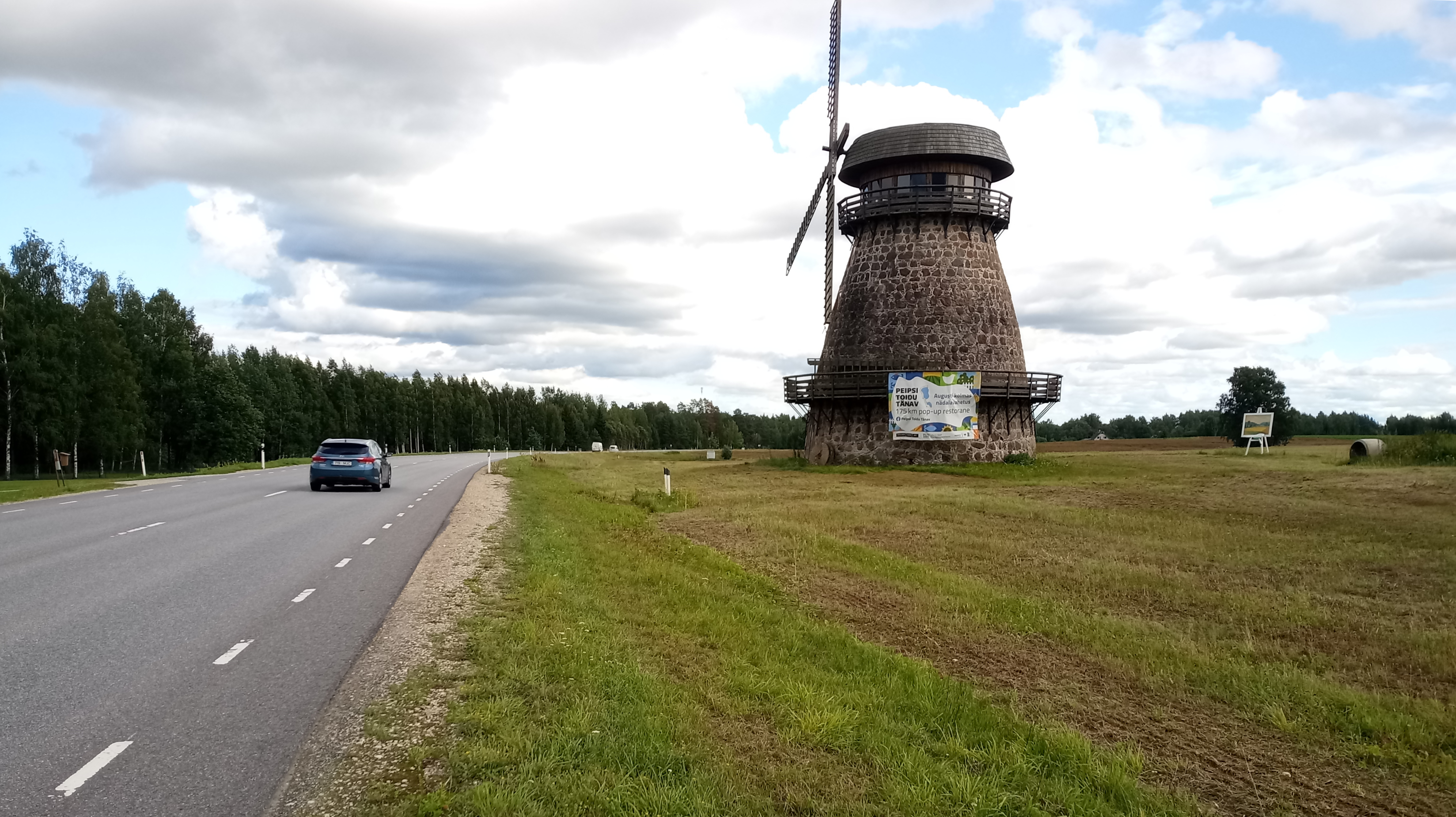

Sudaste is a village in Kastre Parish, Tartu County in eastern Estonia.
