= Tõõraste =

Village in Estonia

Coordinates: 58°17′N 26°46′E

- Village
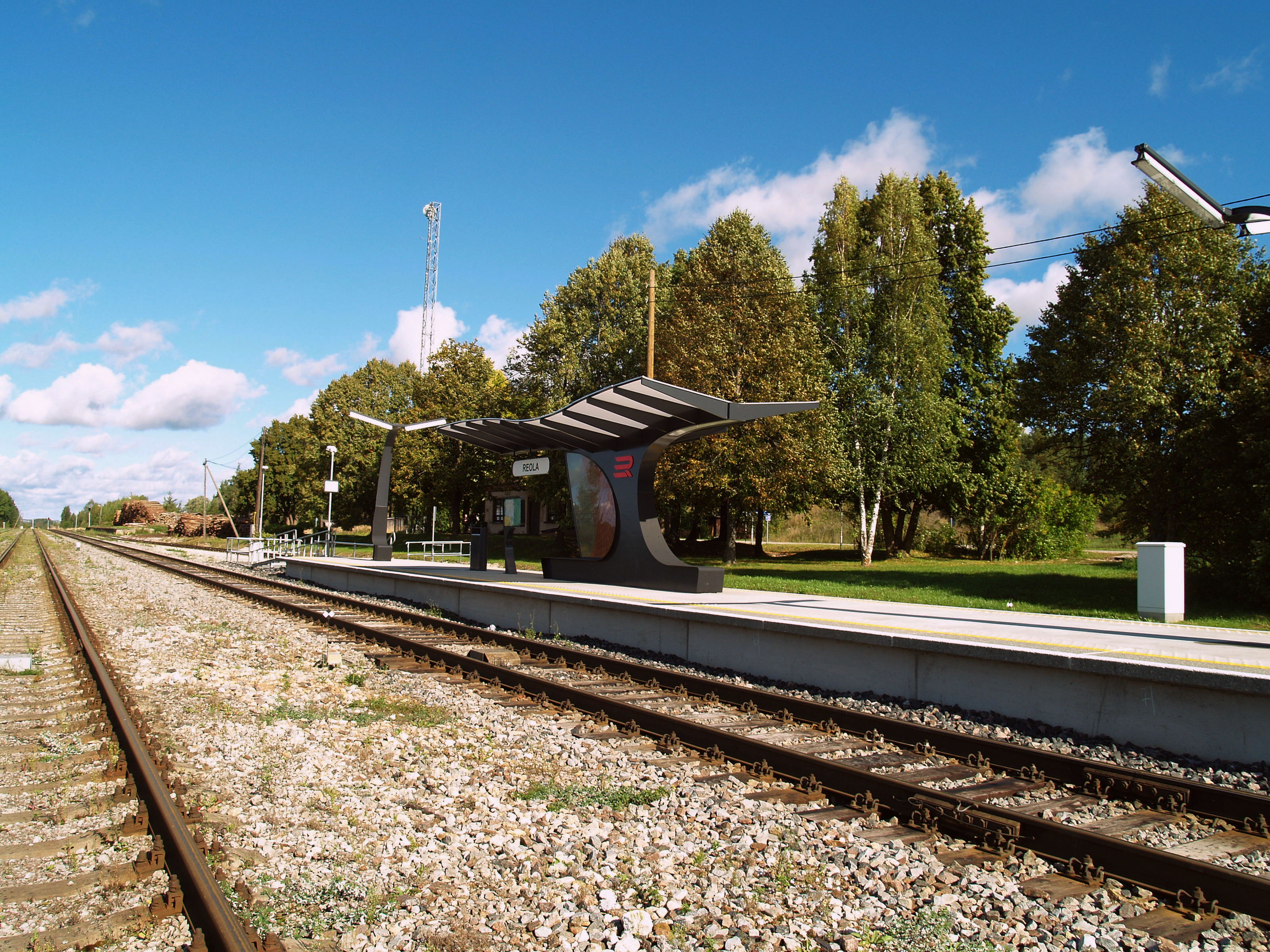
- Reola railway station in Tõõraste.
- Interactive map of Tõõraste
- Country: Estonia
- County: Tartu County
- Parish: Kastre Parish
- Time zone: UTC+2 (EET)
  - Summer (DST): UTC+3 (EEST)

Tõõraste is a village in Kastre Parish, Tartu County in eastern Estonia.

Preceding station	Elron	Following station
Uhti towards Tallinn	Tallinn–Tartu–Koidula	Vana-Kuuste towards Koidula
