= Tammevaldma =

Village in Estonia

Coordinates: 58°20′N 27°01′E

- Village
- Interactive map of Tammevaldma
- Country: Estonia
- County: Tartu County
- Parish: Kastre Parish
- Time zone: UTC+2 (EET)
  - Summer (DST): UTC+3 (EEST)

Tammevaldma is a village in Kastre Parish, Tartu County in eastern Estonia.
