= Alaküla, Tartu County =

Village in Estonia

Alaküla
- Village
- Location within Estonia
- Coordinates: 58°14′22″N 26°55′31″E
- Country: Estonia
- County: Tartu County
- Parish: Kastre Parish
- Time zone: UTC+2 (EET)
  - Summer (DST): UTC+3 (EEST)

Alaküla is a village in Kastre Parish, Tartu County in eastern Estonia.
