= Leho Pent =

Estonian weightlifter (born 1990)

Personal information
- Full name: Leho Pent
- Nationality: Estonian
- Born: Leho Pent; 2 April 1990 (age 36) Paide, Estonia
- Weight: 89 kg (196 lb)

Sport
- Country: Estonia
- Sport: Weightlifting
- Club: SK Vargamäe

Leho Pent (born 2 April 1990) is an Estonian weightlifter competing in the 94 kg category.

Leho is five times Estonian champion in Weightlifting and five times Estonian lifter of the year. He won bronze in 2012 European U23 Weightlifting Championships and in 2013 European U23 Weightlifting Championships. He also holds the Estonian record in the snatch in the 85 kg division.
