= Poka, Tartu County =

Village in Estonia

Coordinates: 58°19′05″N 26°57′57″E

- Village
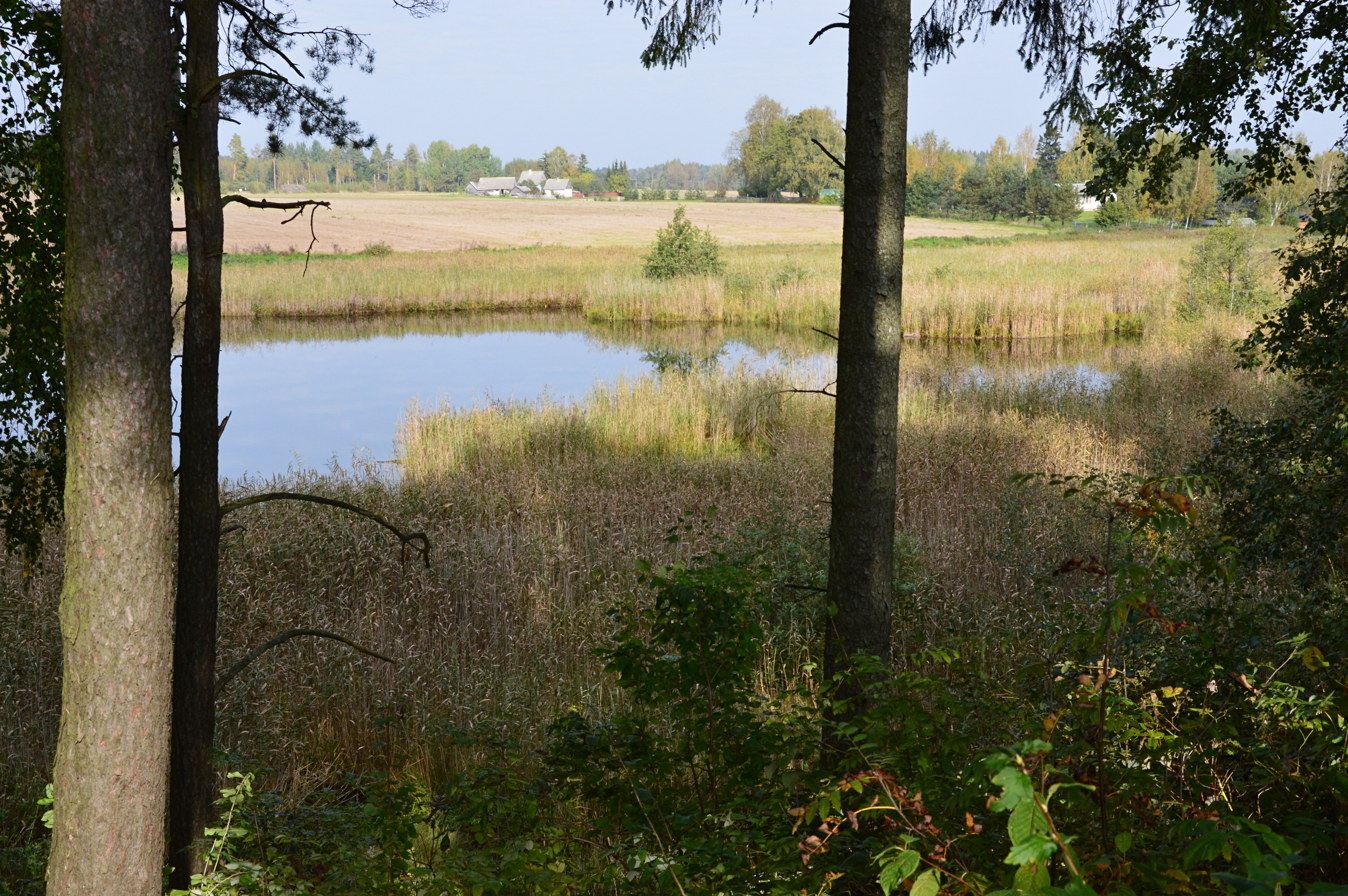
- Lavatsi Lake conservation area
- Interactive map of Poka, Tartu County
- Country: Estonia
- County: Tartu County
- Parish: Kastre Parish
- Time zone: UTC+2 (EET)
  - Summer (DST): UTC+3 (EEST)

Poka is a village in Kastre Parish, Tartu County in eastern Estonia.
