= Roiu =

Borough in Estonia

- Location within Estonia
- Coordinates: 58°18′0″N 26°52′17″E
- Country: Estonia
- County: Tartu County
- Parish: Kastre Parish
- Time zone: UTC+2 (EET)

Roiu is a small borough (alevik) in Kastre Parish, Tartu County, in eastern Estonia.
