= Vana-Kuuste =

Village in Estonia

Coordinates: 58°15′N 26°47′E

- Village
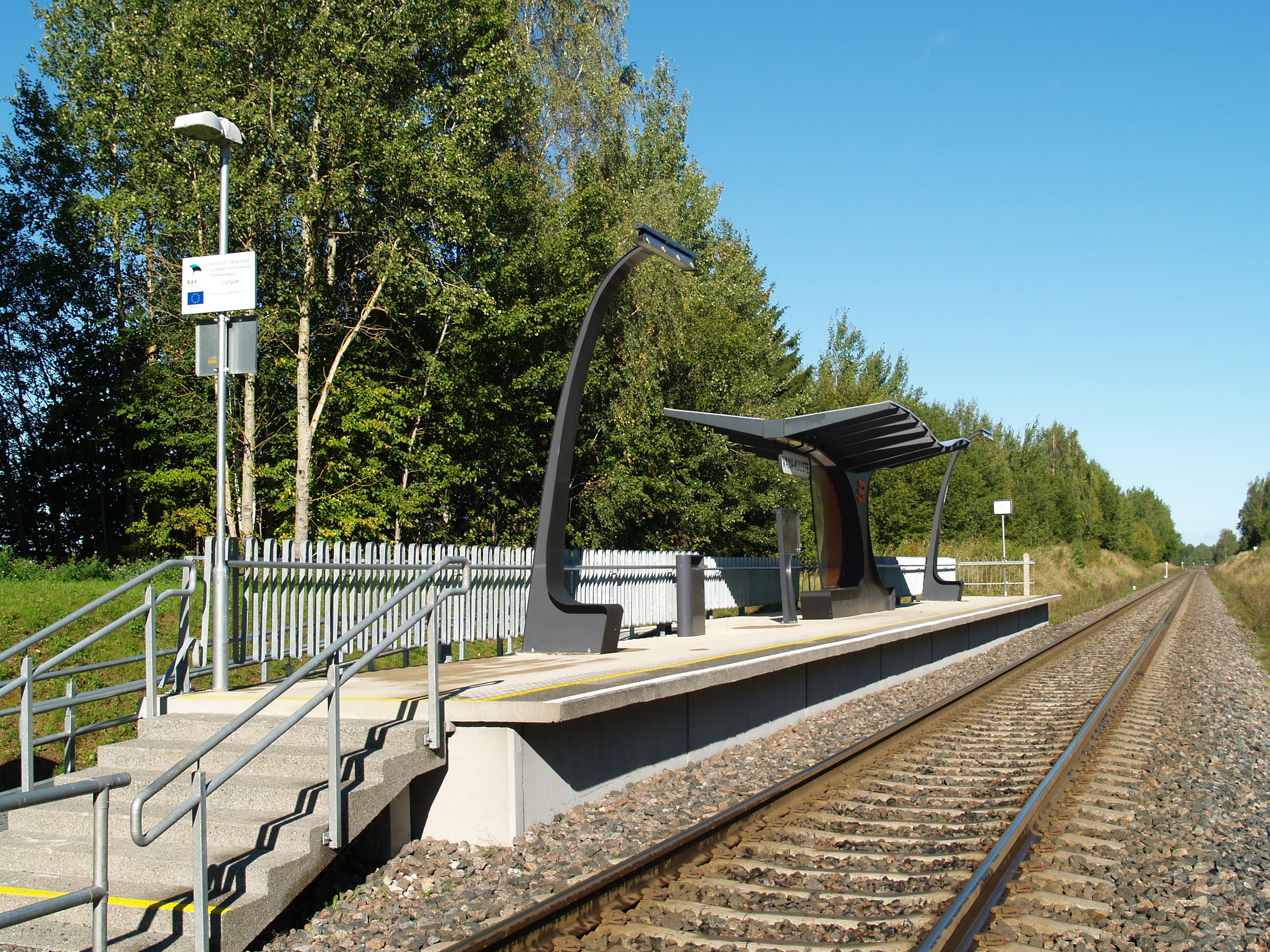
- Vana-Kuuste railway station
- Interactive map of Vana-Kuuste
- Country: Estonia
- County: Tartu County
- Parish: Kambja Parish
- Time zone: UTC+2 (EET)
  - Summer (DST): UTC+3 (EEST)

Vana-Kuuste is a village in Kambja Parish, Tartu County in eastern Estonia.

Opera singer Ivo Posti (born 1975) and writer and translator Kalju Kangur (1925–1989) were born in Vana-Kuuste.

== Gallery ==
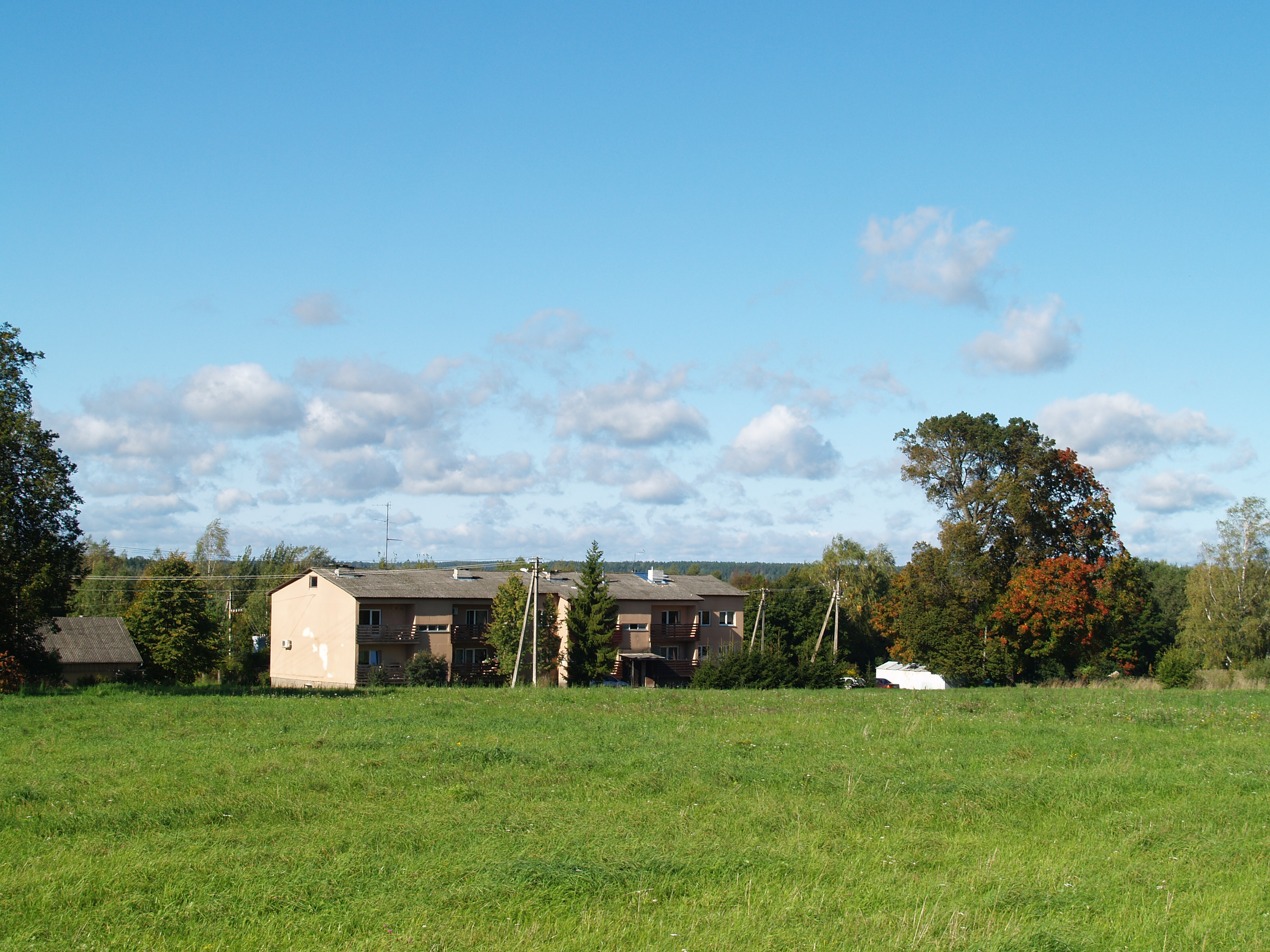
Vana-Kuuste

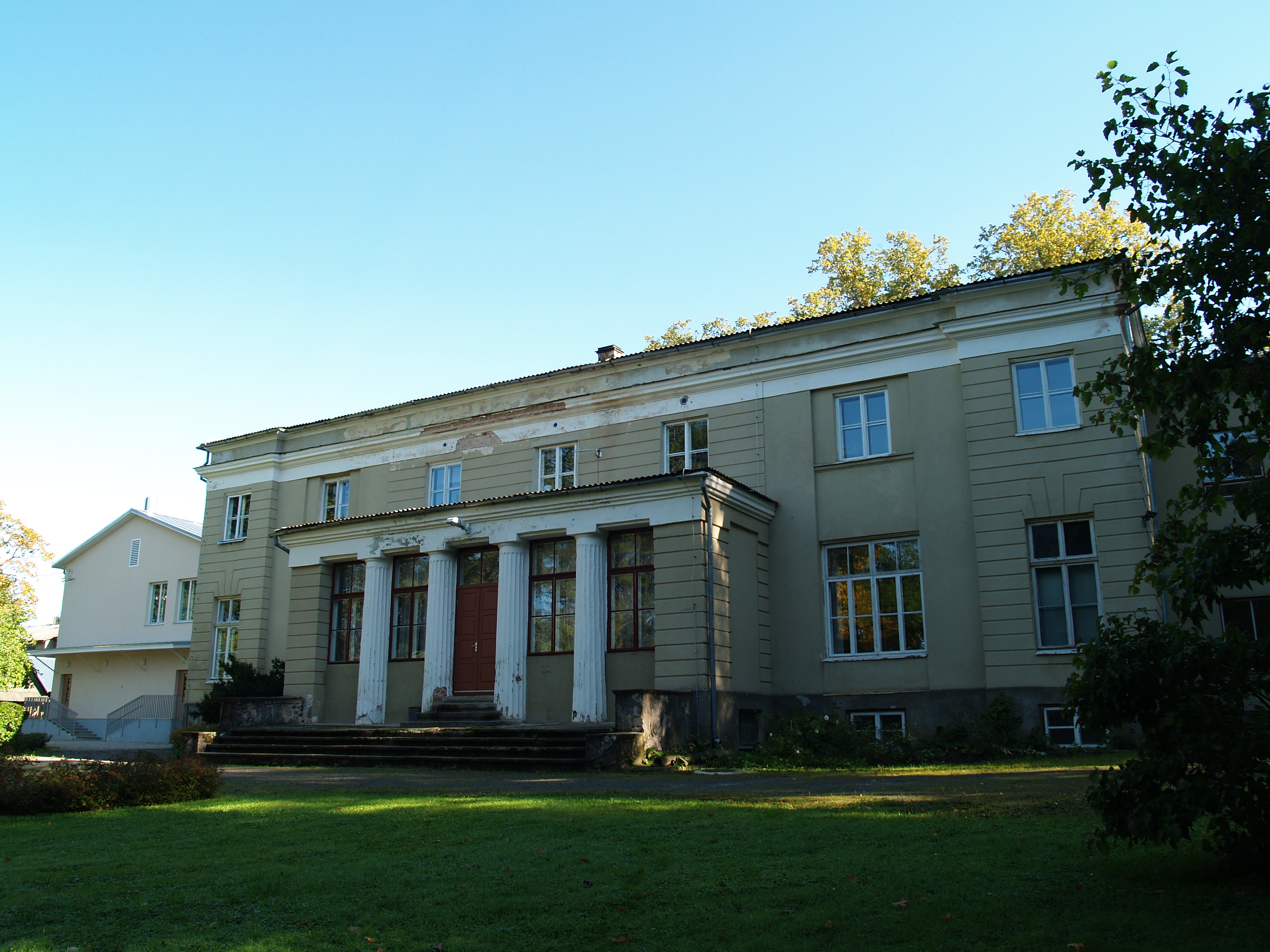
Vana-Kuuste manor house

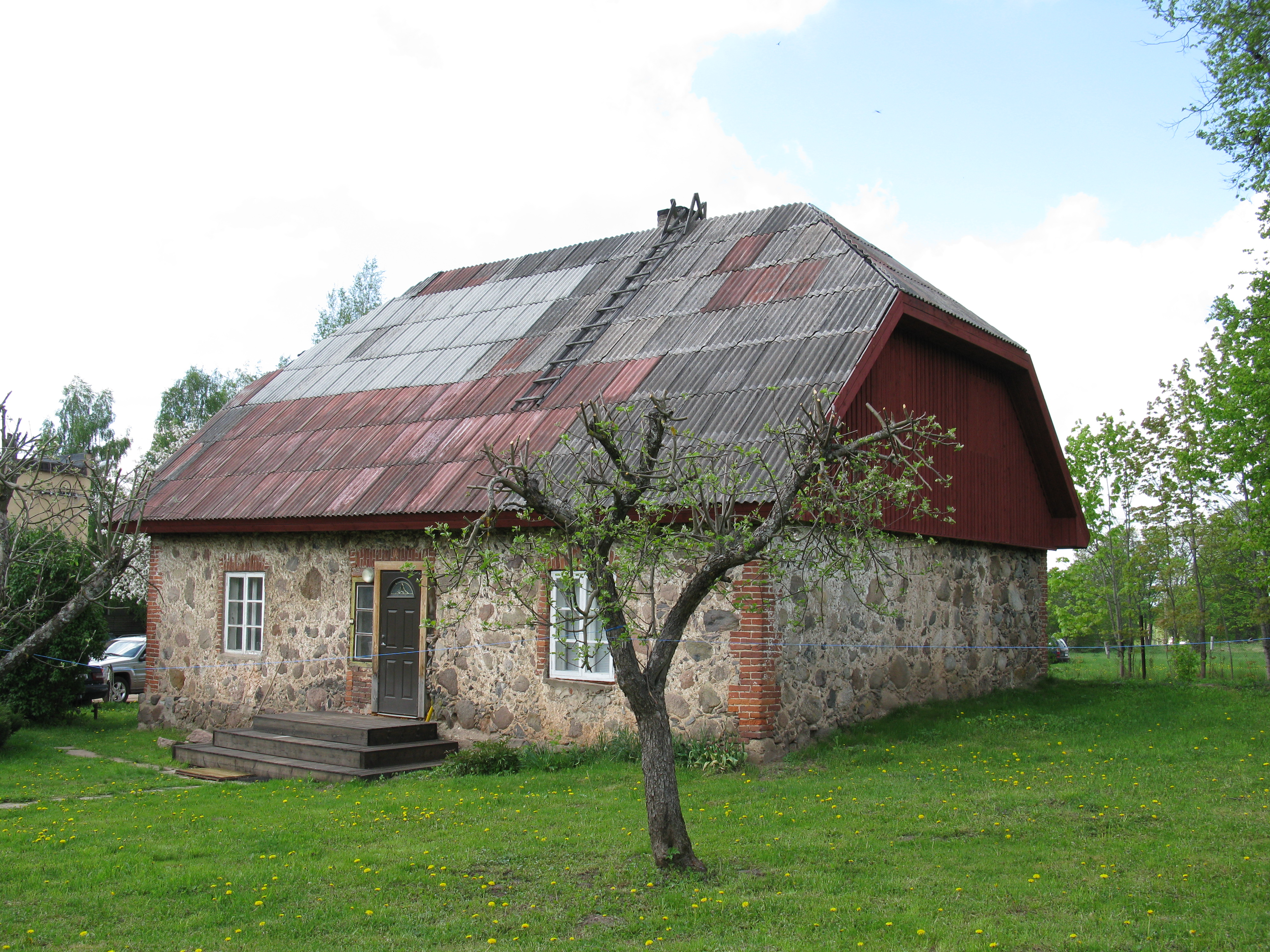
Old Vana-Kuuste courthouse

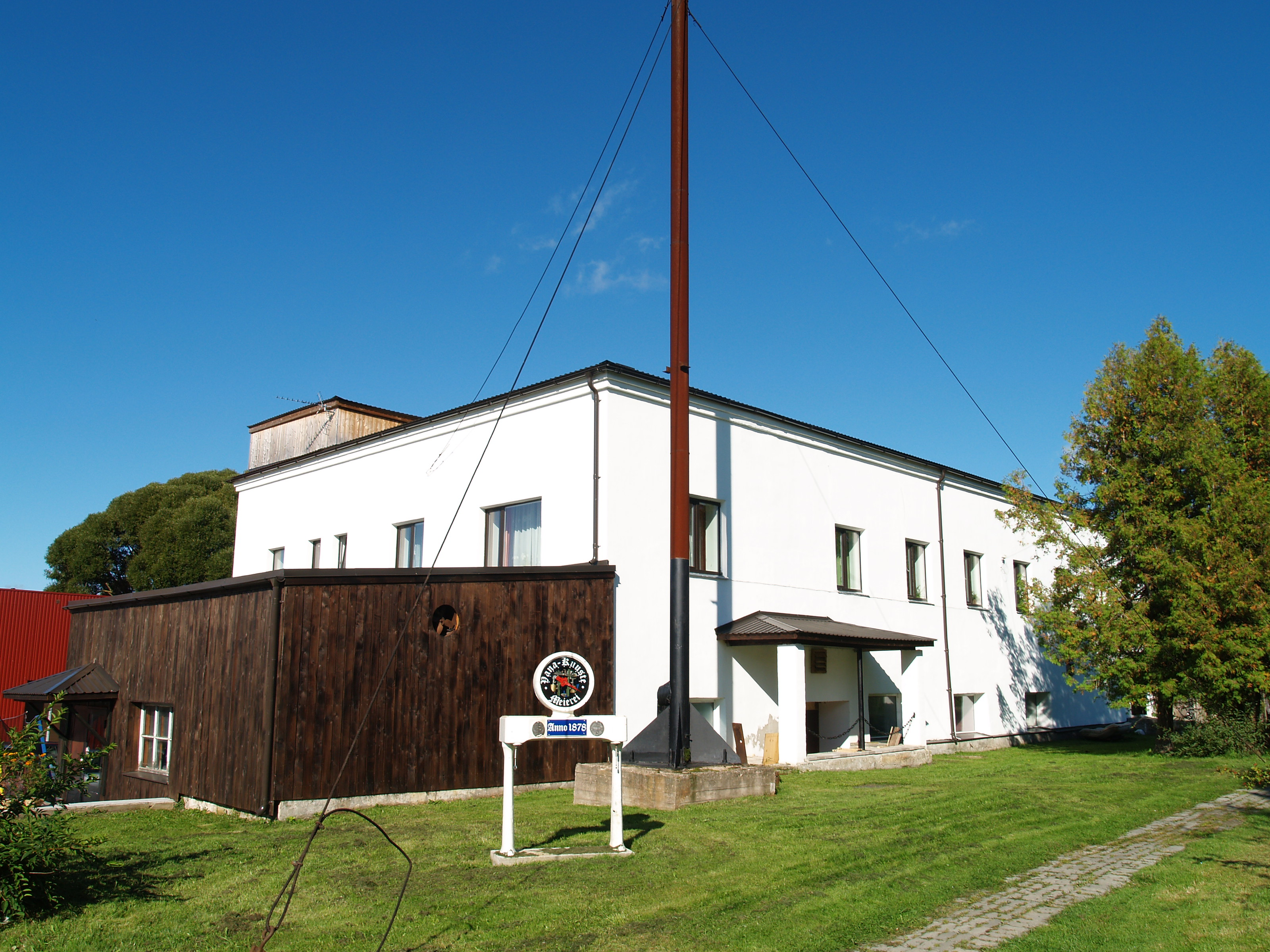
Vana-Kuuste dairy

Preceding station	Elron	Following station
Reola towards Tallinn	Tallinn–Tartu–Koidula	Rebase towards Koidula
