= Kokey =

Kokey may refer to:

- Kokey (film), a 1997 Philippine film
- Kokey (TV series), a 2007 Philippine television series
  - Kokey at Ako, a 2010 Philippine television series, sequel to Kokey
- Kokey, Benin

== See also ==
- Koke (disambiguation)
