= Igevere =

Village in Estonia

Coordinates: 58°17′26″N 26°48′55″E

- Village
- Interactive map of Igevere
- Country: Estonia
- County: Tartu County
- Parish: Kastre Parish
- Time zone: UTC+2 (EET)
  - Summer (DST): UTC+3 (EEST)

Igevere is a village in Kastre Parish, Tartu County in eastern Estonia.
