= Aadami =

Village in Estonia

- Village
- Interactive map of Aadami
- Coordinates: 58°14′22″N 26°52′02″E
- Country: Estonia
- County: Tartu County
- Parish: Kastre Parish
- Time zone: UTC+2 (EET)
  - Summer (DST): UTC+3 (EEST)

Aadami is a village in Kastre Parish, Tartu County in eastern Estonia. In 2012, it had a population of 44.
