= Lehte Hainsalu =

Estonian writer, poet and politician

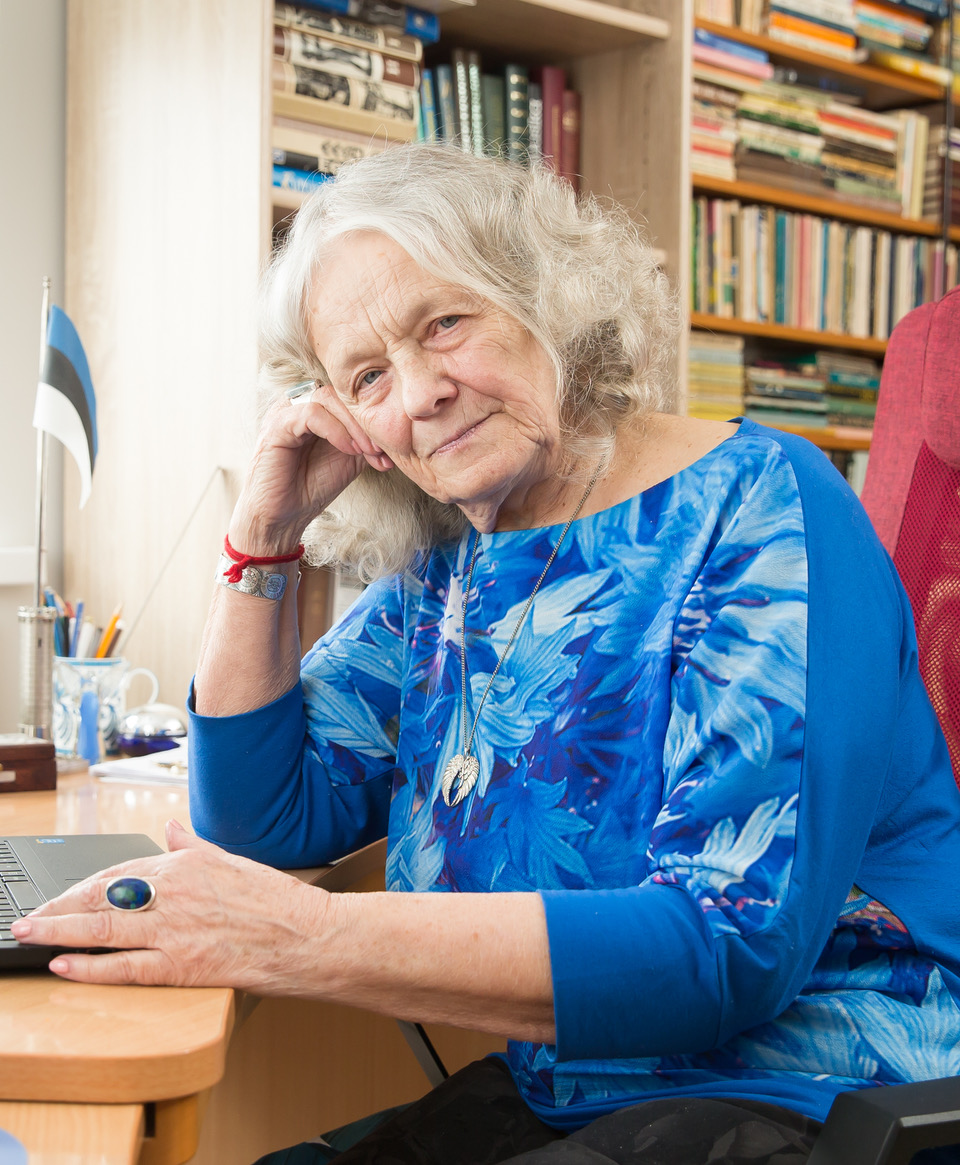
Lehte Hainsalu (2018)

Lehte Hainsalu (married name Lehte Sööt; born 31 October 1938, Haaslava Parish, Tartu County) is an Estonian writer, poet and politician.

In 1961 she graduated from Tartu State University, having studied Estonian philology. After graduation, she worked at the newspaper Edasi; at the Tartu Widget Factory (Estonian: Tartu Aparaaditehas); and at Eesti Televisioon studios in Tartu.

From 1981 to 1990, she was the head of Tartu division of the Estonian Writers' Union.

In 1980, she signed the Letter of 40 intellectuals.

She has won many awards, including the Friedebert Tuglas short story award (1987), and the Karl Eduard Sööt Prize for Children's Poetry (1992, 2015).

== Works ==
- 1957: poetry collection "Sõnajala õis"
- 1967: novel "Pigilinnu laul"
- 1980: poetry collection "Ainsa ööga läbi maa"
- 2003: poetry collection "Lapsed lennand tuulde"
- 2011: novel "Vastamata kõne"
