= Ivo Posti =

Estonian countertenor and historian

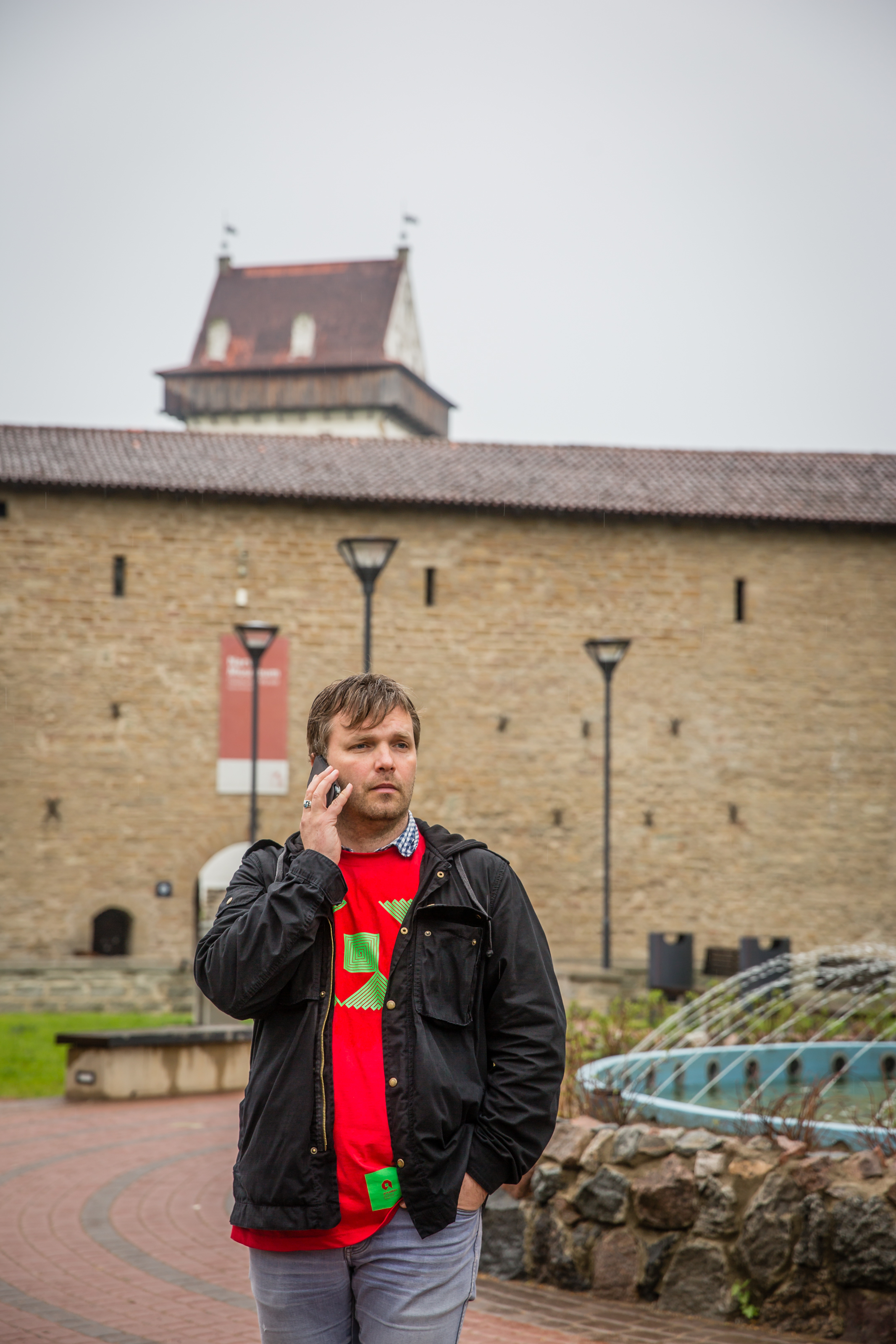
- Ivo Posti (2016)

Background information
- Born: 26 October 1975 (age 50); Vana-Kuuste, then part of Estonian SSR, Soviet Union
- Occupations: countertenor, historian

Ivo Posti (born 26 October 1975 in Vana-Kuuste) is an Estonian countertenor and historian. Director of Narva Museum.

== Early life ==
Ivo Posti at first studied history in the Estonian University of Tartu and became a teacher of Political Science. Between 1996–2001, he studied singing with Aino Kõiv at the Heino Eller Music School in Tartu, and from 2001 until 2007, he studied at Royal Conservatory of The Hague where his teachers were Rita Dams and Barbara Pearson. He has also studied with Marius van Altena and Diane Forlano and has had master classes with Taru Valjakka, Thomas Wiedenhofer, Michael Chance, Jill Feldman, Rick Harrell, Niels Muus, Brian Masuda and Roberta Alexander.

== Career ==
Ivo Posti has given concerts in Estonia and abroad. He has also won many prizes in different competitions (both as a pop singer and an opera singer). Since 2005 Posti has organized masterclasses for classical singers in Tartu.

In the 2007–2008 season, Posti was a member of Opera Studio Nederland. In January 2008 he debuted in co-operation with the Aix-en-Provence Festival in France, where he performed the role of The Spirit in Dido and Aeneas by Henry Purcell in Opéra de Lille and Grand Théâtre de Provence (conducted by Kenneth Weiss). In the season 2008-2009 he sang the role of Grazia in Ercole Amante by Francesco Cavalli in De Nederlandse Opera and role of Parque in Hippolyte et Aricie by Jean-Philippe Rameau at the Nationale Reisopera in The Netherlands. He also performed George Frideric Handel's Brockes Passion in April 2009 with Concerto Copenhagen (conducted by Kenneth Weiss) in Spain. In June 2010 he sang the role of Vjazemskaja in The Dog's Heart by Alexander Raskatov (world-premiere) at De Nederlandse Opera.

Posti also sings jazz and ballades as a baritone.

== Sources ==
- Opera Studio Nederland Biography
- José Iturbi Foundation, 24 Semi-Finalists Selected to Compete for $250000 in Cash Prizes in the 2007 José Iturbi Music Competition
- Pelegrin, Benito, Review: Aix-en-Provence. Grand Théâtre de Provence, le 23 janvier 2008. Henry Purcell, Didon et Enée. Académie Européenne de Musique, Classique News, 28 January 2008 (in French)
