= Paluküla, Tartu County =

Village in Estonia

Coordinates: 58°15′53″N 26°56′24″E

- Village
- Interactive map of Paluküla, Tartu County
- Country: Estonia
- County: Tartu County
- Parish: Kastre Parish
- Time zone: UTC+2 (EET)
  - Summer (DST): UTC+3 (EEST)

Paluküla is a village in Kastre Parish, Tartu County in eastern Estonia.
