= Koke Iglesias =

Spanish footballer (born 2005)

Personal information
- Full name: Jorge Iglesias González
- Date of birth: 16 March 2005 (age 21)
- Place of birth: Valladolid, Spain
- Height: 1.85 m (6 ft 1 in)
- Position: Right-back

Team information
- Current team: Ponferradina

Youth career
- 2015–2022: Valladolid

Senior career*
Years	Team	Apps	(Gls)
2022–2026	Valladolid B	88	(2)
2024–2026	Valladolid	1	(0)
2026	→ Ponferradina (loan)	16	(0)
2026–	Ponferradina	0	(0)

International career^{‡}
2021–2022	Spain U17	6	(0)
2022	Spain U18	2	(0)
2023–	Spain U19	1	(0)
- * Club domestic league appearances and goals as of 25 May 2026 ‡ National team caps and goals as of 18 November 2023

Jorge Iglesias González (born 16 March 2005), known as Koke Iglesias or just Koke, is a Spanish footballer who plays for SD Ponferradina. Mainly a right-back, he can also play as a midfielder.

== Club career ==
Koke was born in Valladolid, Castile and León, and joined Real Valladolid's youth sides in 2015, aged ten. He made his senior debut with the reserves on 23 October 2022, coming on as a half-time substitute in a 3–0 Segunda Federación home loss to Real Avilés CF.

Koke scored his first senior goal on 10 December 2023, netting the B's equalizer in a 2–1 home win over UP Langreo. The following 11 January, he renewed his contract until 2026.

Koke made his first team debut on 4 May 2024, replacing Monchu late into a 1–0 Segunda División away win over CD Mirandés. On 30 January 2026, after being mainly used with the B-team, he renewed his link until 2027 and was loaned to Primera Federación side SD Ponferradina until June.

On 31 August 2026, Koke terminated his link with Valladolid, and returned to Ponfe on a permanent deal.

== International career ==
Koke represented Spain at under-17, under-18 and under-19 levels.
