= Metsanurga, Kastre Parish =

Village in Estonia

Coordinates: 58°20′01″N 26°53′07″E

Metsanurga, Tartu County
- Village
- Interactive map of Metsanurga, Tartu County
- Country: Estonia
- County: Tartu County
- Parish: Kastre Parish
- Time zone: UTC+2 (EET)
  - Summer (DST): UTC+3 (EEST)

Metsanurga is a village in Kastre Parish, Tartu County in eastern Estonia.
