= Melliste =

Village in Estonia

- Location within Estonia
- Coordinates: 58°19′44″N 26°58′53″E
- Country: Estonia
- County: Tartu County
- Time zone: UTC+2 (EET)

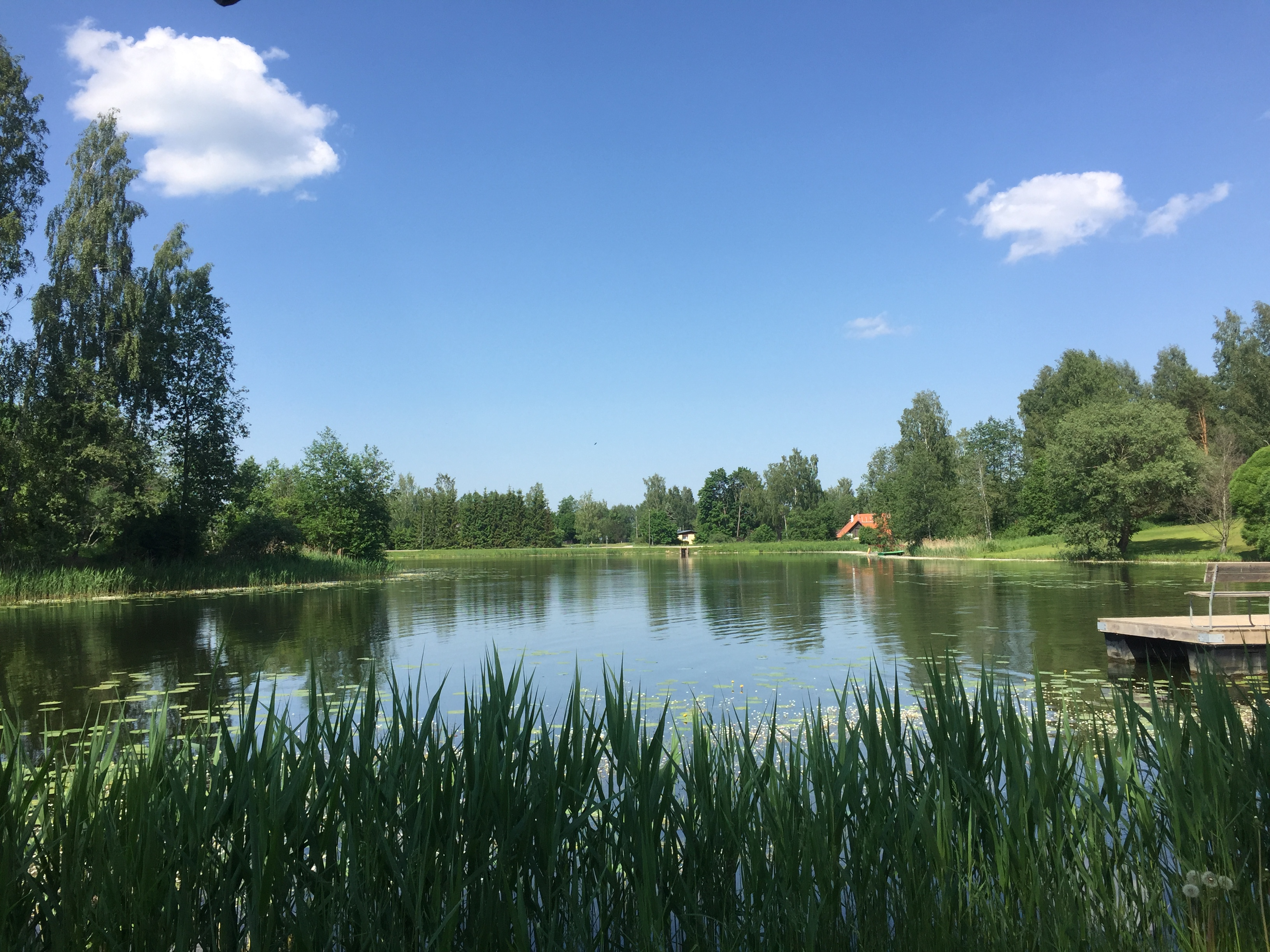

Melliste is a settlement in Kastre Parish, Tartu County in eastern Estonia.
