= Andrus Utsar =

Estonian weightlifter

Andrus Utsar (born 20 March 1976) is an Estonian weightlifter.

He was born in Tallinn.

Andrus has competed in numerous European Championships. He failed a doping test in 2006 and got two year suspension for the use of Stanozolol.

His father is Karl Utsar, another Estonian weightlifter.
