= Koke, Estonia =

Village in Estonia

Coordinates: 58°19′N 26°53′E

- Village
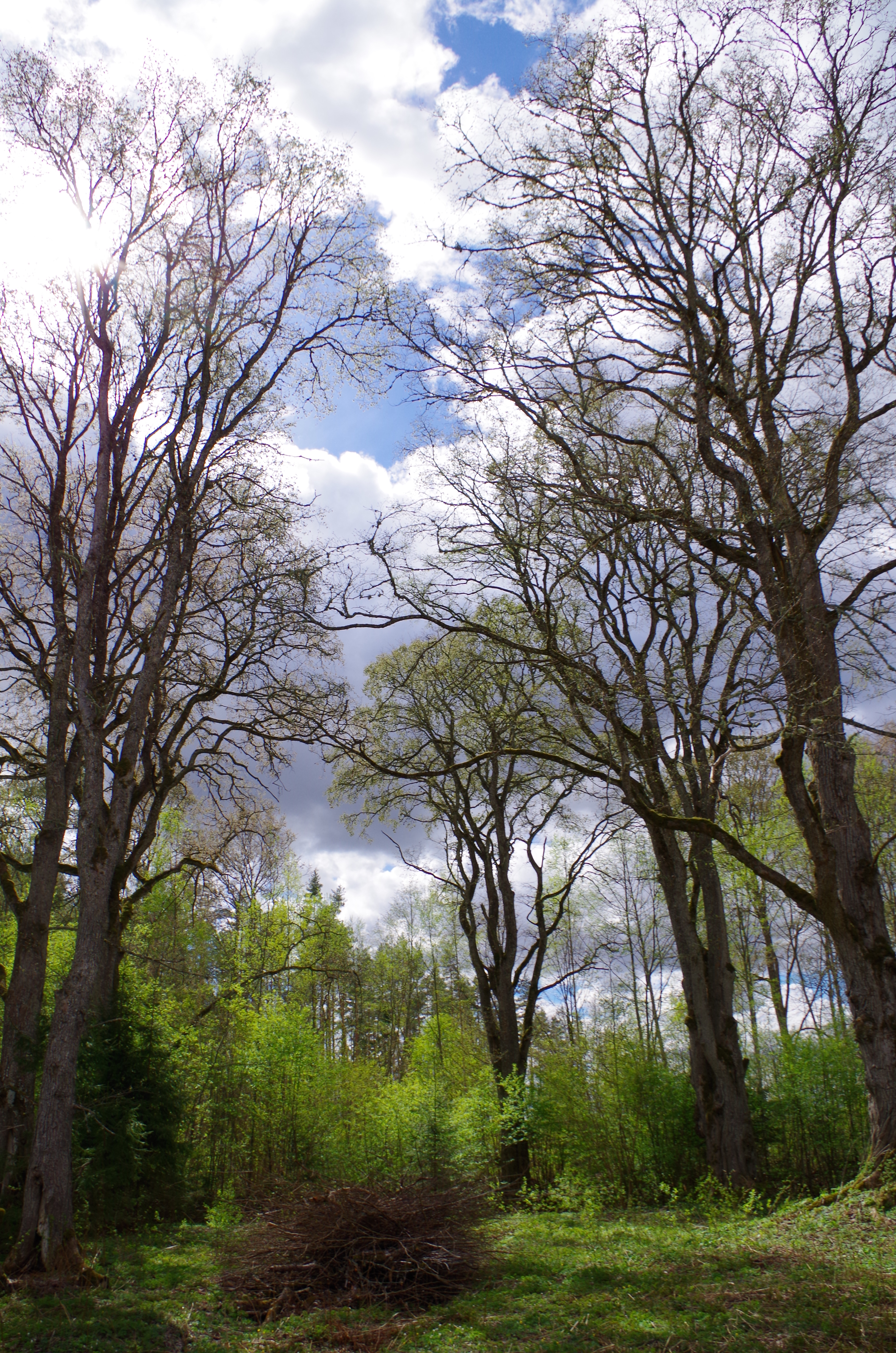
- Kiigeoru Hiiesalu wildlife sanctuary
- Interactive map of Koke, Estonia
- Country: Estonia
- County: Tartu County
- Parish: Kastre Parish
- Time zone: UTC+2 (EET)
  - Summer (DST): UTC+3 (EEST)

Koke is a village in Kastre Parish, Tartu County in eastern Estonia.
