= Albu, Estonia =

Village in Estonia

Albu
- Village
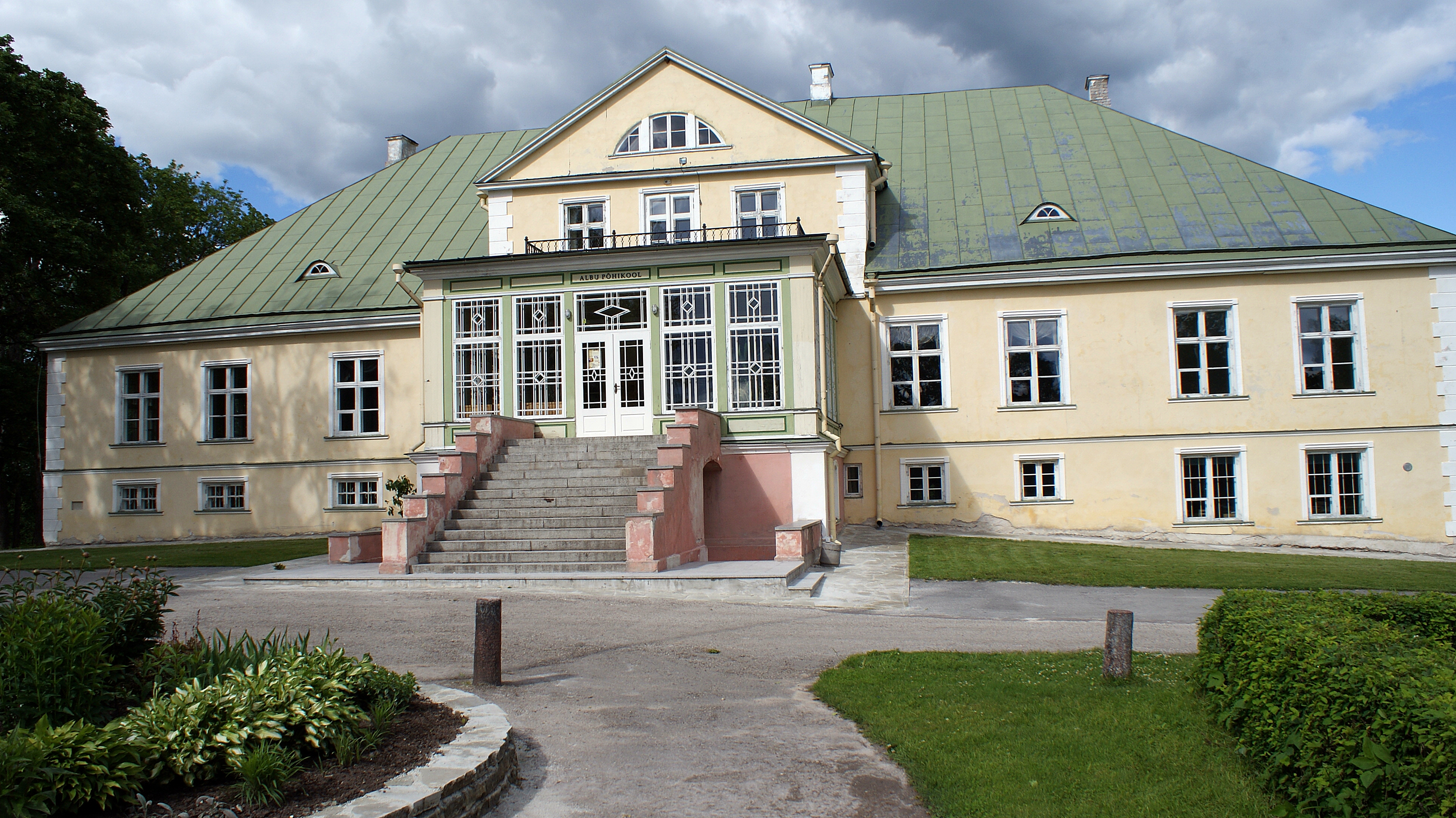
- Albu Manor

- Location in Estonia
- Coordinates: 59°09′00″N 25°40′00″E
- Country: Estonia
- County: Järva County
- Parish: Järva Parish
- Time zone: UTC+2 (EET)
  - Summer (DST): UTC+3 (EEST)

Drone video of Albu village and its manor, July 2021

Albu is a village in Järva Parish, Järva County in northern-central Estonia.

== Albu Manor ==
Albu Manor (German: Alp) is the oldest manor in Järva County, mentioned for the first time in written sources in 1282. Fragments of the medieval walls are still preserved in the basement of the current manor house. The manor belonged to the Teutonic Order until the Livonian War. The present building was begun in 1717 and finished in 1742, when Gustaf Otto Douglas was the owner of the estate. An academy for orphans from aristocratic families is said to have operated at Albu 1718–1740.

The manor house is an example of baroque manor house architecture, with a veranda added in 1888. The interior holds some remarkable original wall and ceiling decorations, which were discovered during a renovation in 1995, as well as other notable architectural details.
