= Kastre =

Village in Estonia

Coordinates: 58°22′N 27°05′E

- Village
- Interactive map of Kastre
- Country: Estonia
- County: Tartu County
- Parish: Kastre Parish
- Time zone: UTC+2 (EET)
  - Summer (DST): UTC+3 (EEST)

Kastre (German: Kaster) is a village in Kastre Parish, Tartu County in eastern Estonia.

== Gallery ==
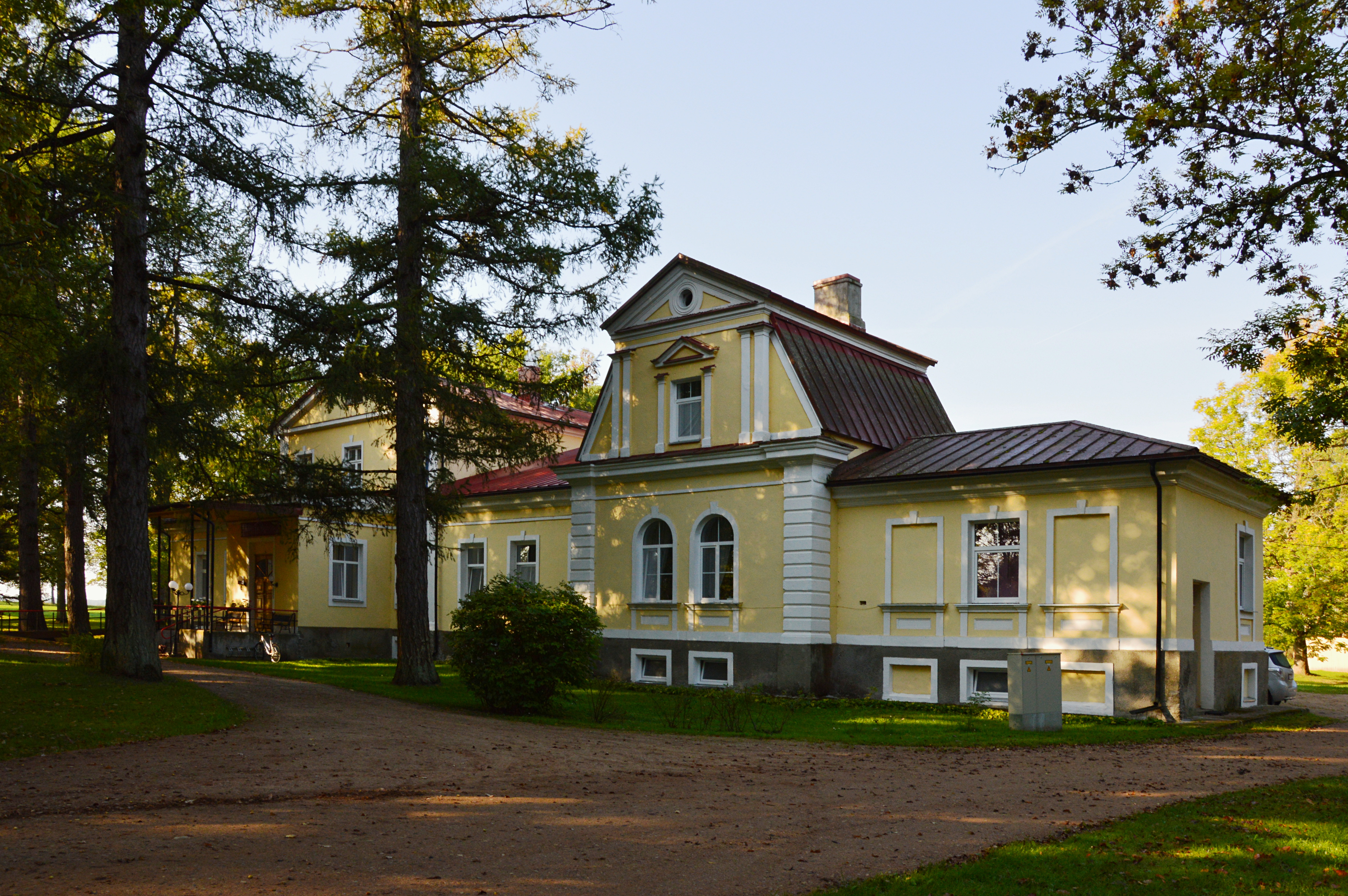
Kastre manor house

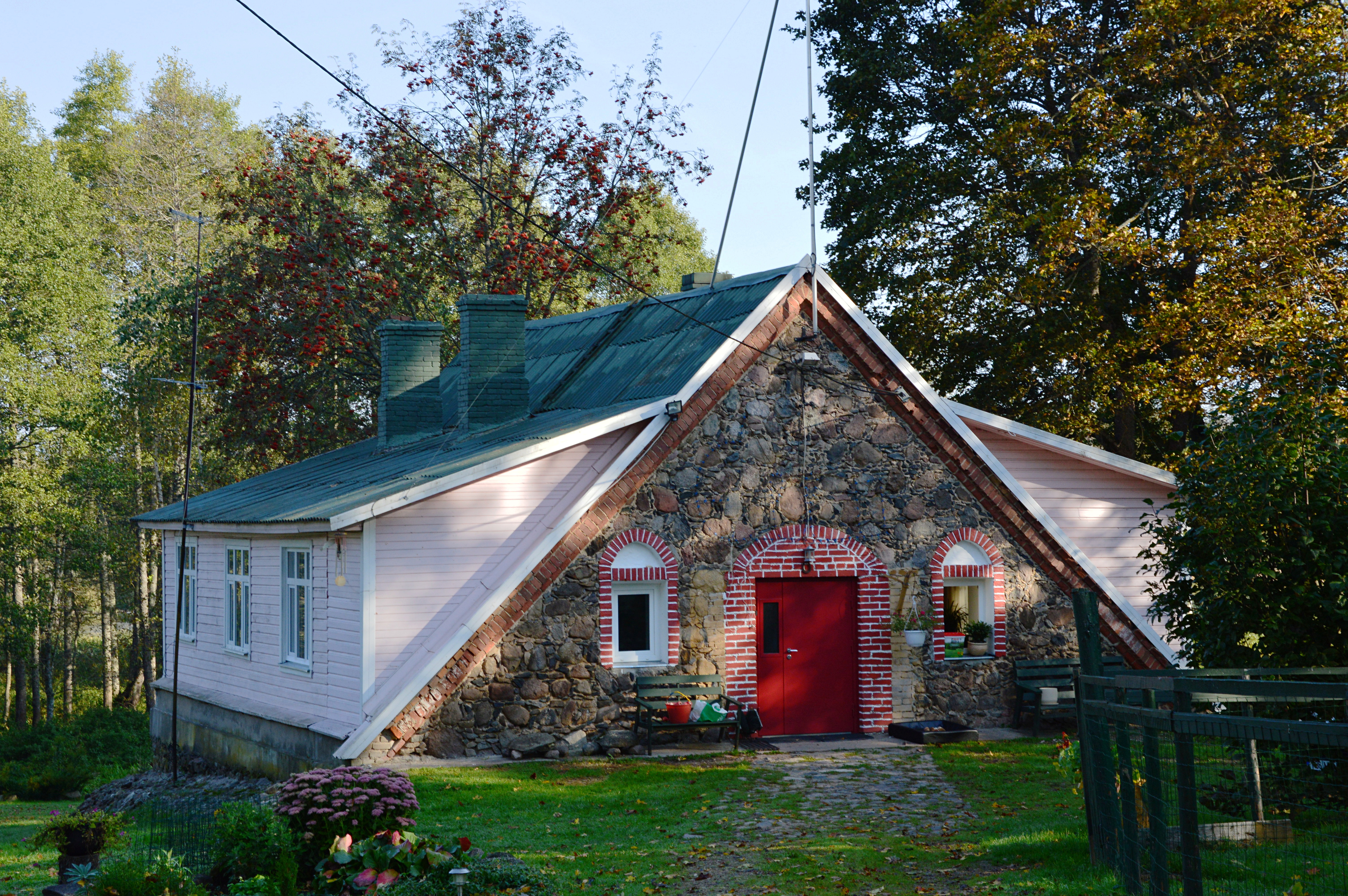
House in Kastre village

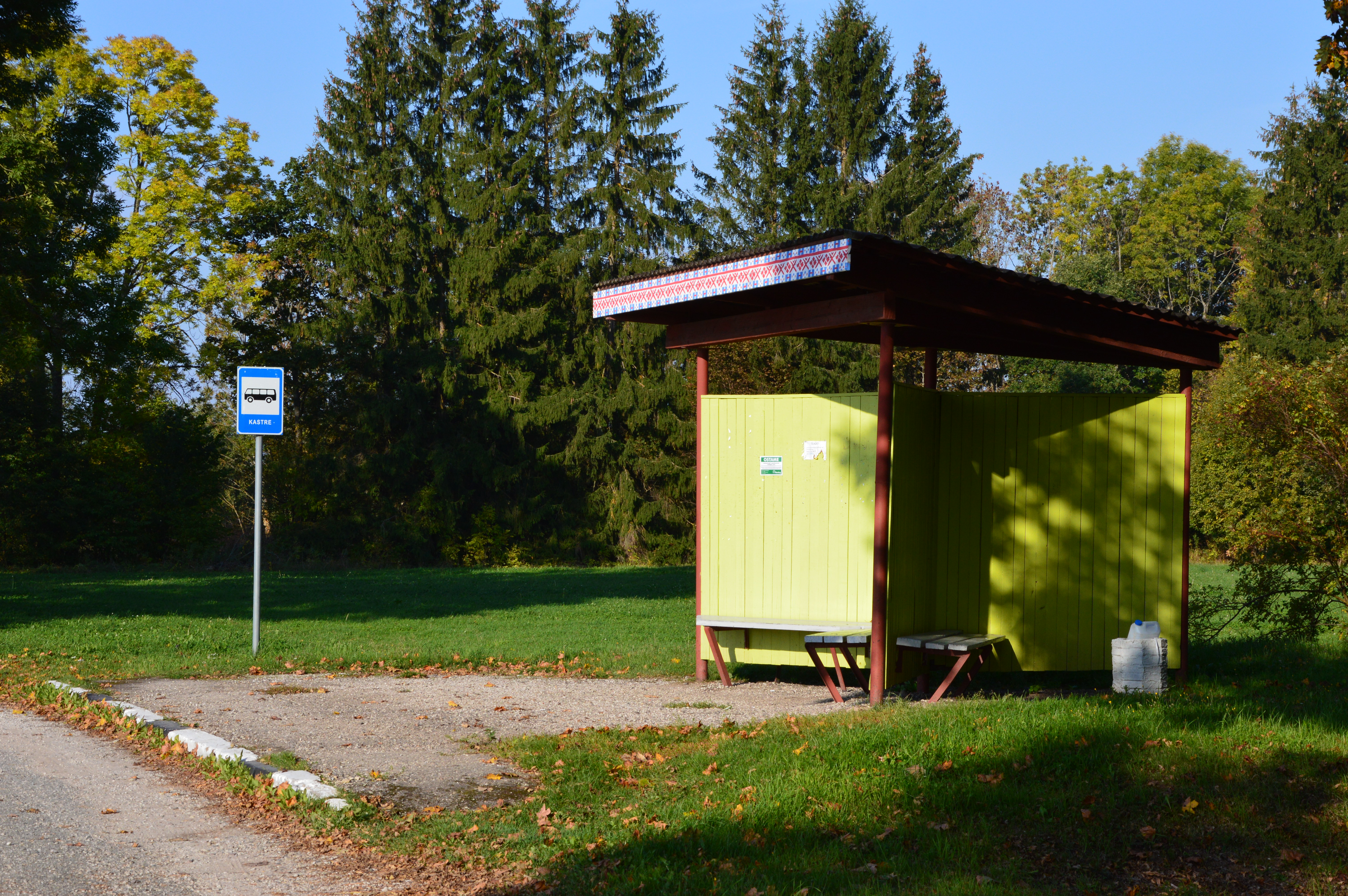
Kastre bus stop

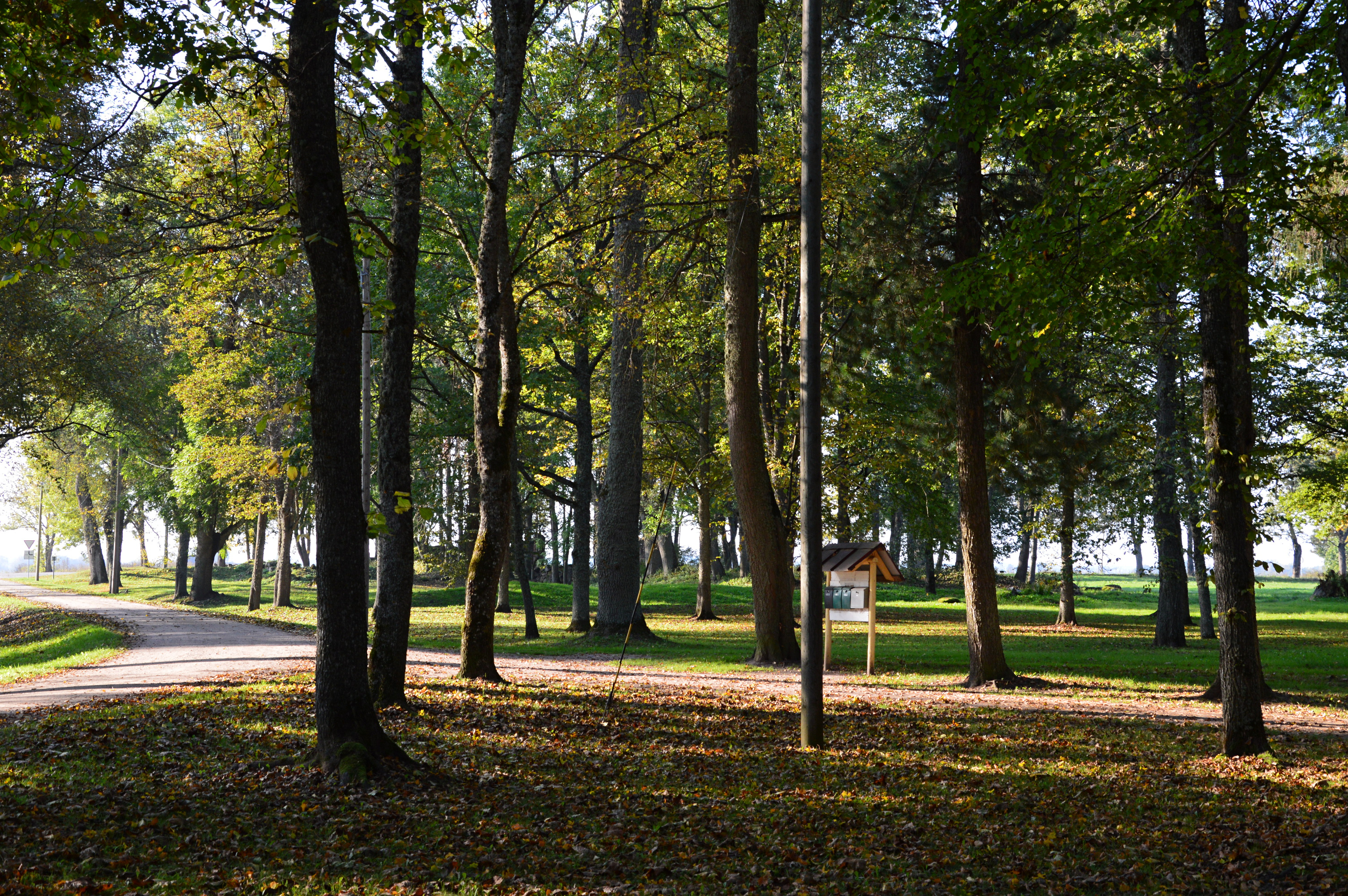
Kastre park
