= Kastre Parish =

Municipality in Estonia

Kastre Parish Kastre vald
- Municipality of Estonia
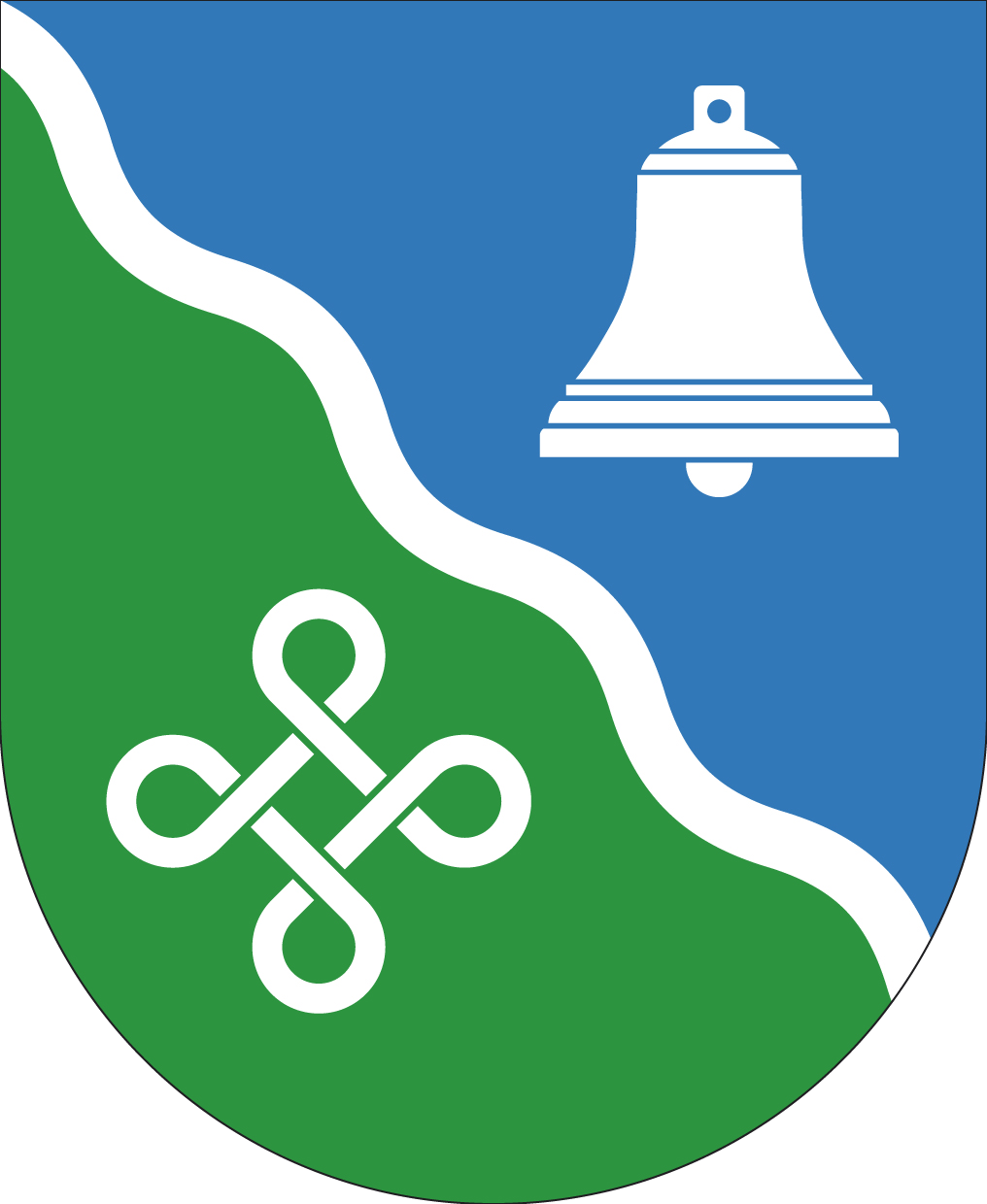
- Flag Coat of arms

- Tartu Parish within Tartu County.
- Coordinates: 58°19′00″N 27°04′00″E
- Country: Estonia
- County: Tartu County
- Administrative centre: Kastre

Government
  - Mayor: Annika Pajumaa-Murov

Area
  - Total: 493 km^{2} (190 sq mi)

Population (2026)
  - Total: 6,380
  - Density: 12.9/km^{2} (33.5/sq mi)
- ISO 3166 code: EE-291

Kastre Parish (Estonian: Kastre vald) is a rural municipality in Tartu County, Estonia.

== Demographics ==
As of 1 January 2026, the parish had 6,380 residents, of which 3,199 (50.1%) were women and 3,181 (49.9%) were men.

=== Religion ===
In terms of religion in the 2021 census of at least 15-years old residents 9.4 per cent declared themselves Lutheran, 3.9 per cent declared themselves Orthodox. The majority of residents of the parish, 83.5 per cent declared themselves religiously unaffiliated. 1.1 per cent of the population followed other religions, the religious preference of 2.1 per cent of residents remained unknown in the survey.

== Notable people ==
- Carl Eduard Körber (1802 in Võnnu – 1883), a pastor and writer of Baltic German ancestry
- Martin Körber (1817 in Võnnu – 1893), a Baltic German pastor, composer, writer and choir leader.
- Gustav Suits (1883 in Võnnu – 1956), one of Estonian's greatest poets, early leader of Noor-Eesti (Young Estonia).
- August Kork (1887 in Aardla – 1937), an Estonian Soviet Red Army commander (Komandarm 2nd rank)
- August Johannes Salum (1894 – 1969), veterinarian and politician; worked in Põltsamaa, 1953 to 1965
- Karl Oskar Freiberg (1894 – 1941), journalist, theatre critic, playwright, translator and politician.
- Virve Kiple (1927 – 2009), ballerina, actress, and director.
- Lehte Hainsalu (born 1938 in Kurepalu), writer, poet and politician.
