= European route E263 =

Road in trans-European E-road network

E263

Major junctions
- From: Tallinn
- To: Luhamaa

Location
- Countries: Estonia
- Major cities: Tallinn; Tartu; Võru

Highway system
- International E-road network; A Class; B Class

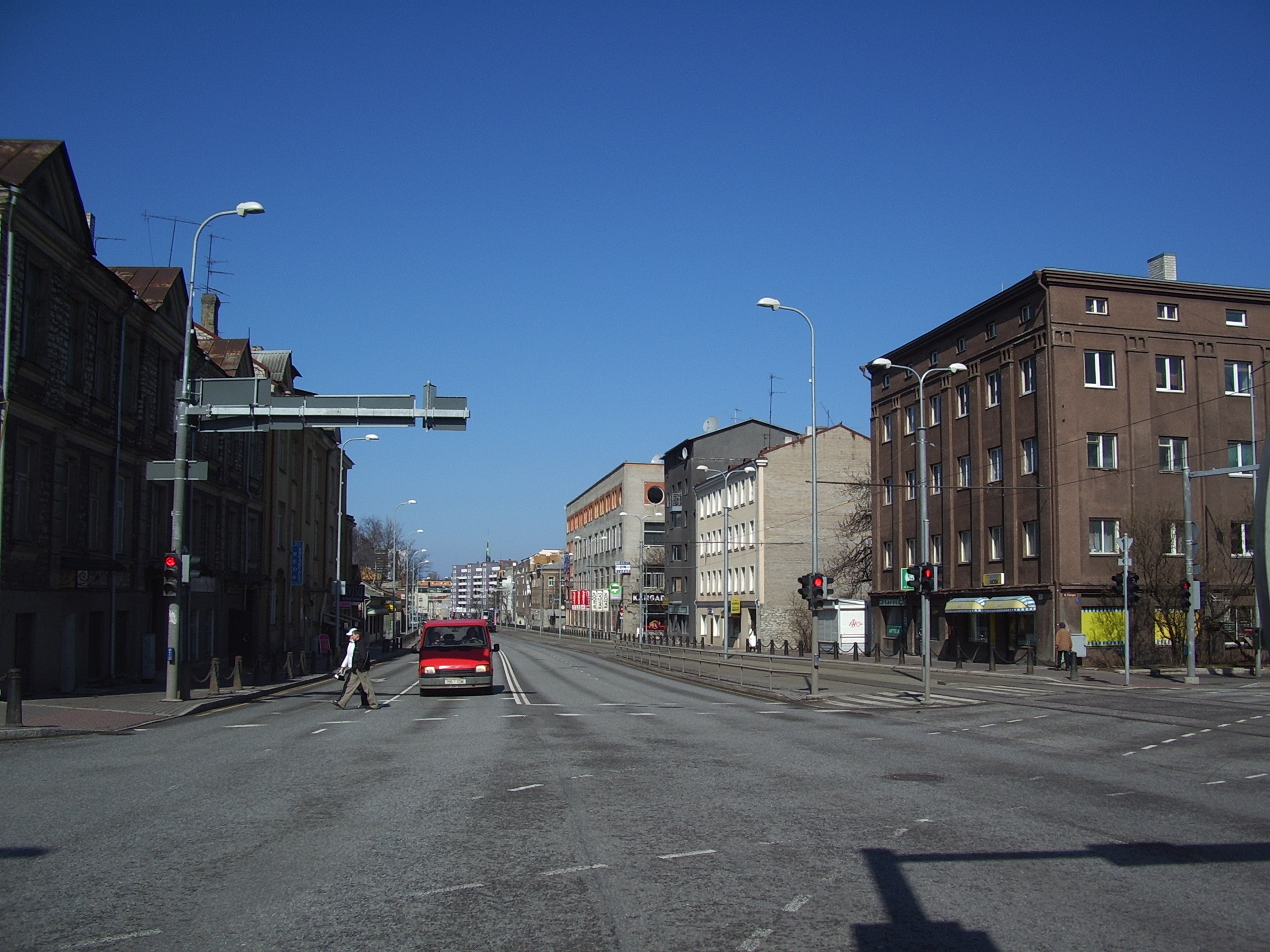
Tartu road in Tallinn.

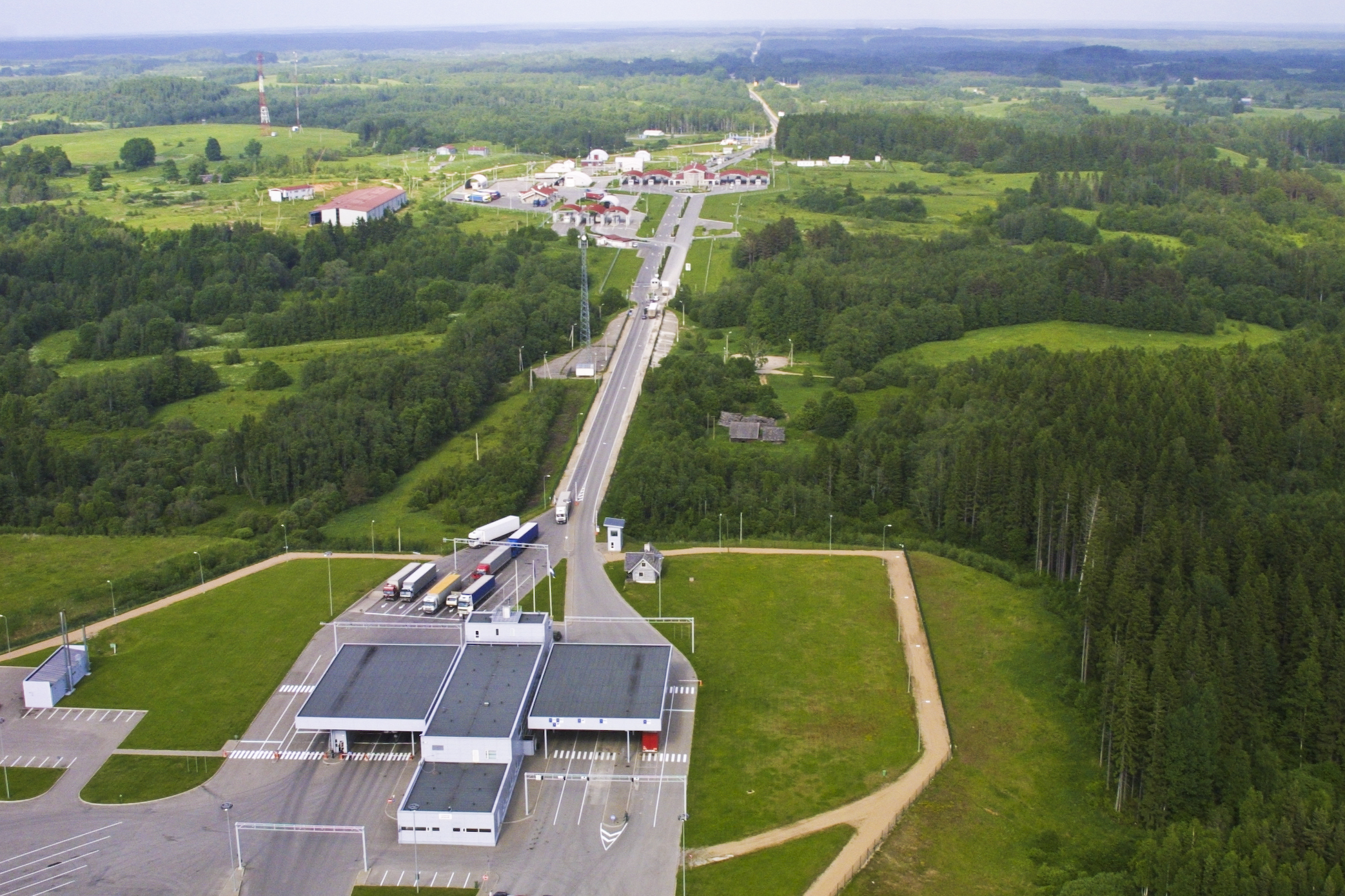
Road at the border at Luhamaa

European route E 263 is a Class B road part of the International E-road network. It runs only through Estonia, begins in Tallinn and ends in Luhamaa, Võru County, and shares exactly the same route as Estonian national road 2.

Route: Tallinn – Tartu – Võru – Luhamaa.

Its total length is 288.5 km (179.3 mi).

== Route ==
- Harju County
  - Tallinn
    - E20/ T1 Narva, Saint Petersburg
    - Tallinn Airport
  - Jüri E265/ T11 Keila, Paldiski
  - Kose T12 Kehra, Jägala
  - Kose T14 Juuru, Hagudi
  - Kose
  - Ardu
- Järva County
  - Mäo T5 Pärnu/Rakvere
  - Nurmsi T25 Koeru
  - Koigi
  - Imavere T49 Võhma, Viljandi, Karksi-Nuia
- Jõgeva County
  - Adavere
  - Põltsamaa
    - T37 Jõgeva
    - T38 Kõo, Võhma
  - Puurmani
- Tartu County
  - Kärevere T41 Kärkna
  - Tähtvere T40 Tartu
  - Tartu
    - T92 Viljandi
    - E264/ T3 Valga, Valmiera, Inčukalns / Jõhvi
  - Tõrvandi
  - Ülenurme
    - Tartu Airport
  - Reola T61 Põlva
  - Tatra T46 Otepää, Sangaste
  - Kambja
- Põlva County
  - Saverna T89 Põlva
  - Kanepi
    - T71 Otepää, Rõngu
    - T62 Põlva, Räpina
- Võru County
  - Vagula T69 Sõmerpalu, Sangaste, Tõrva
  - Võru
    - T64 Põlva
    - T65 Räpina
    - T66 -> T67 Varstu, Valga
  - Vastseliina
  - Luhamaa E77/ T7

== Gallery ==
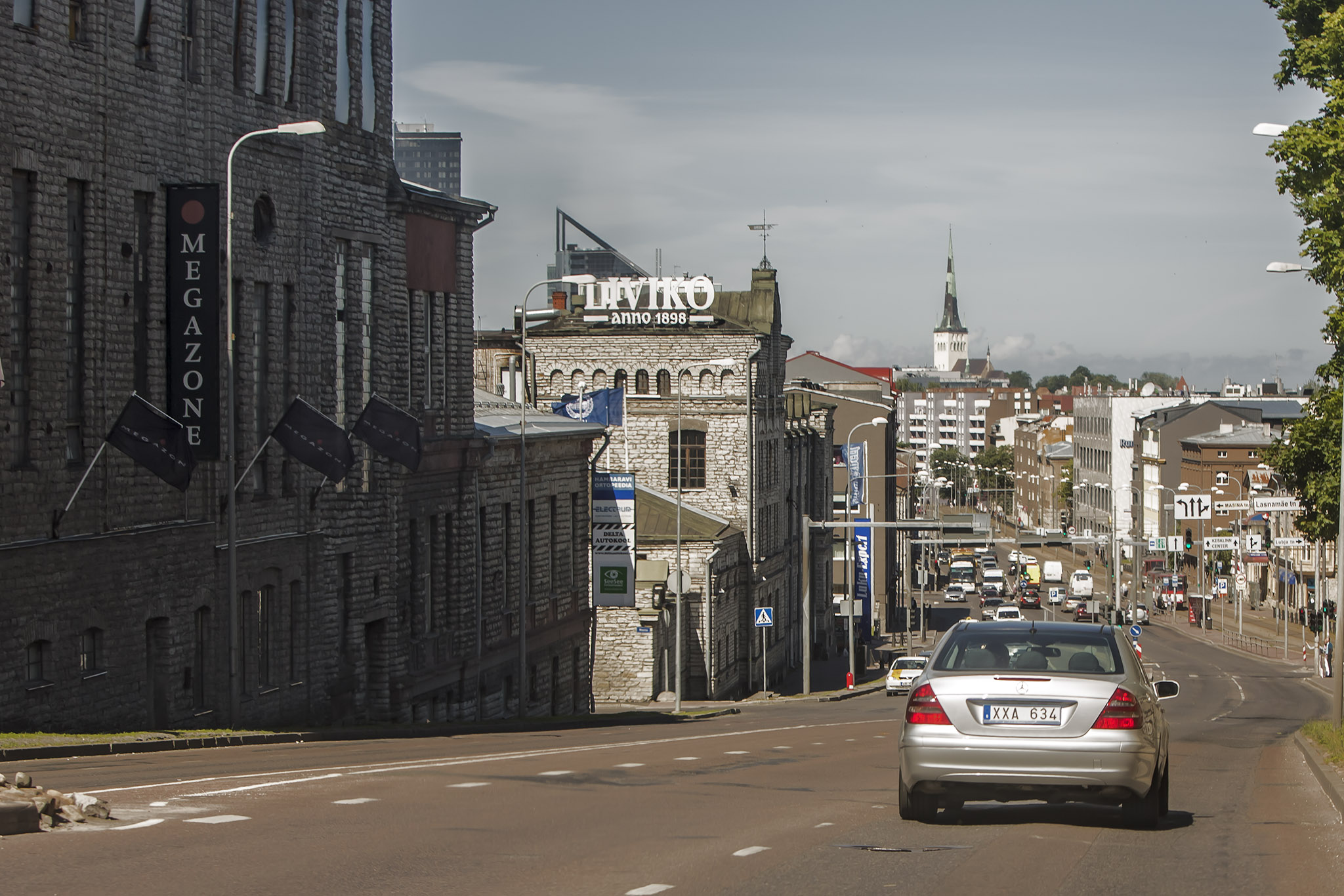
E263 between Tallinn city centre and Tallinn Airport.

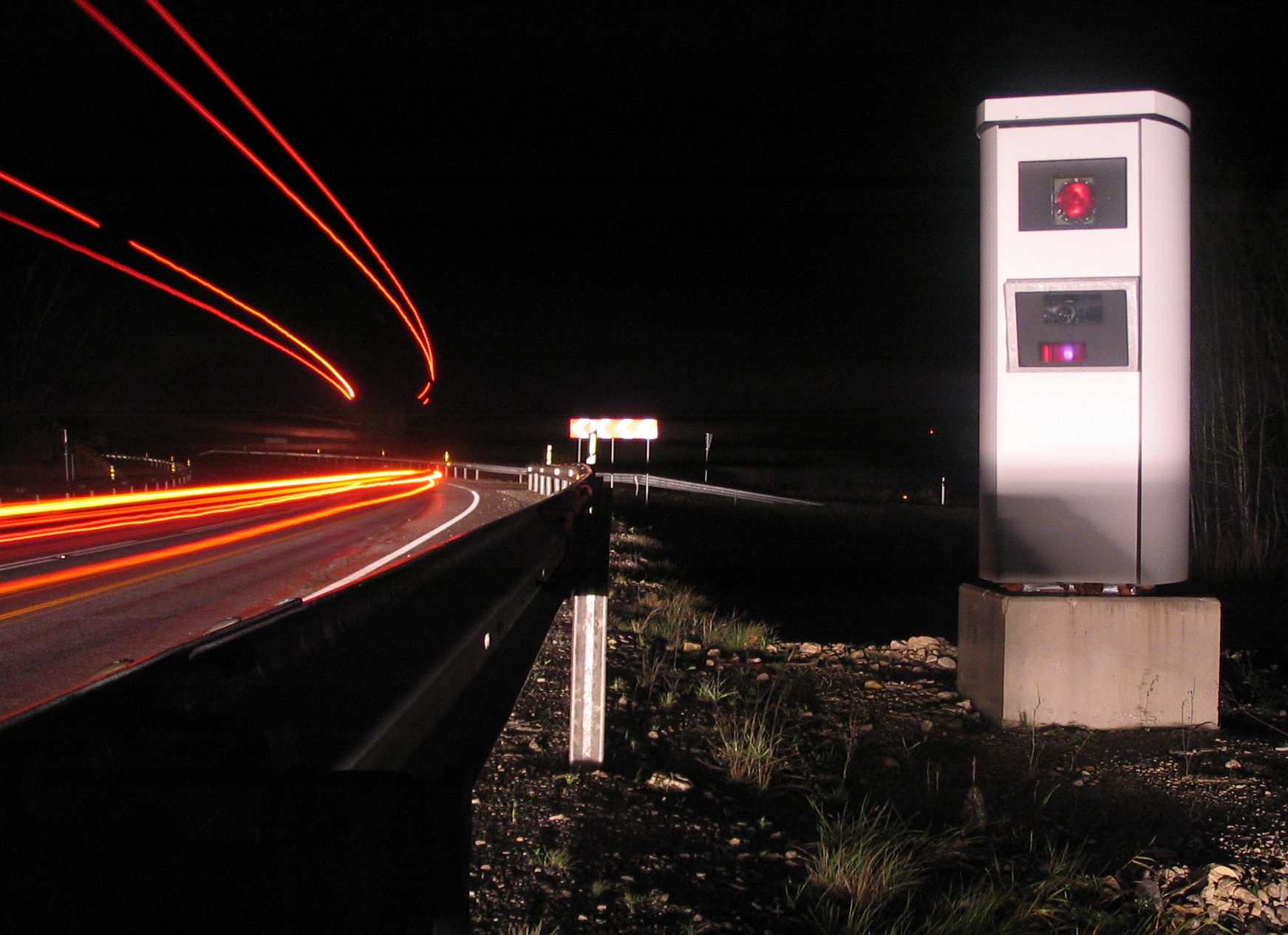
Speed camera on E263.

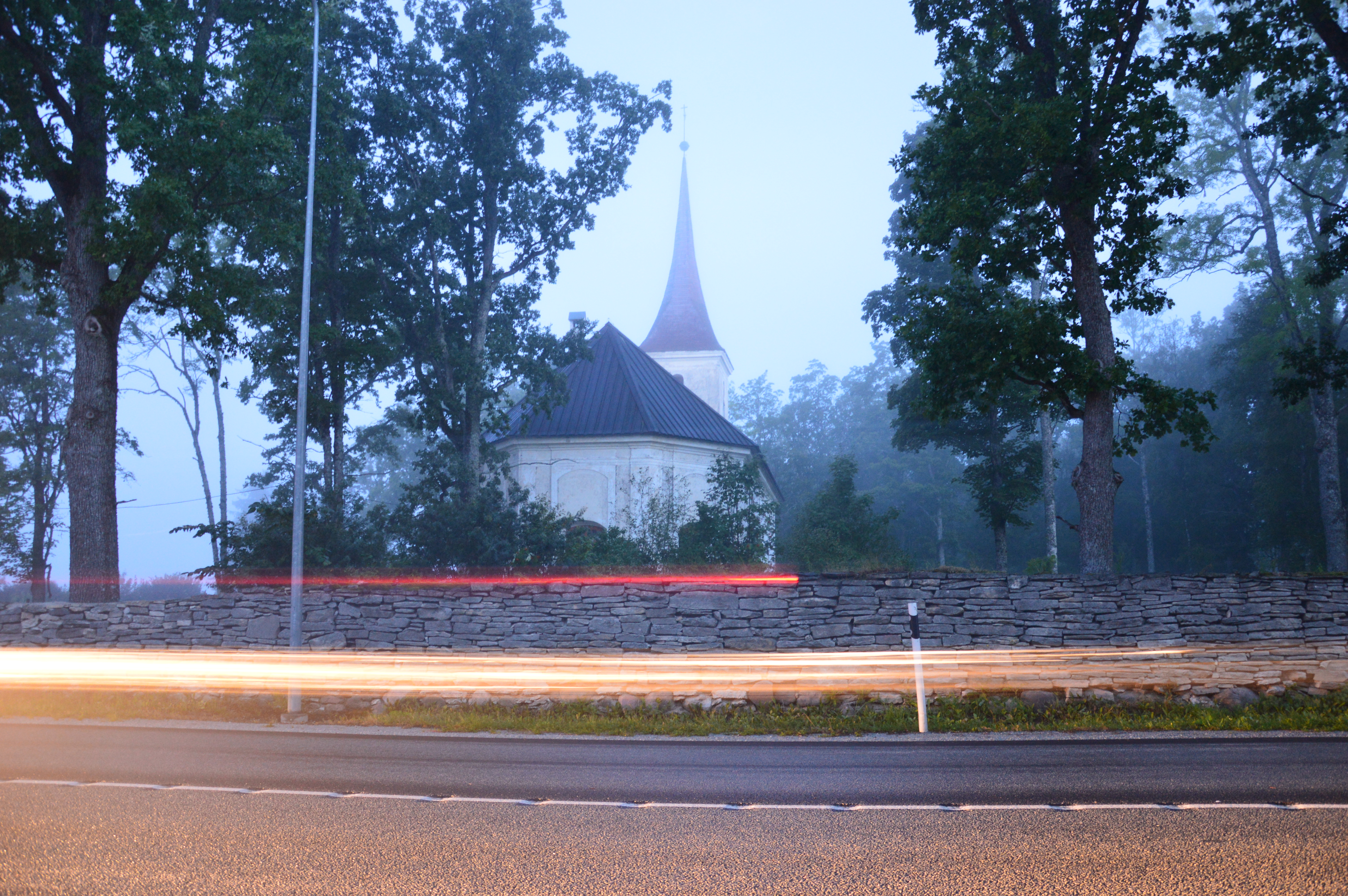
Anna church next to the road.

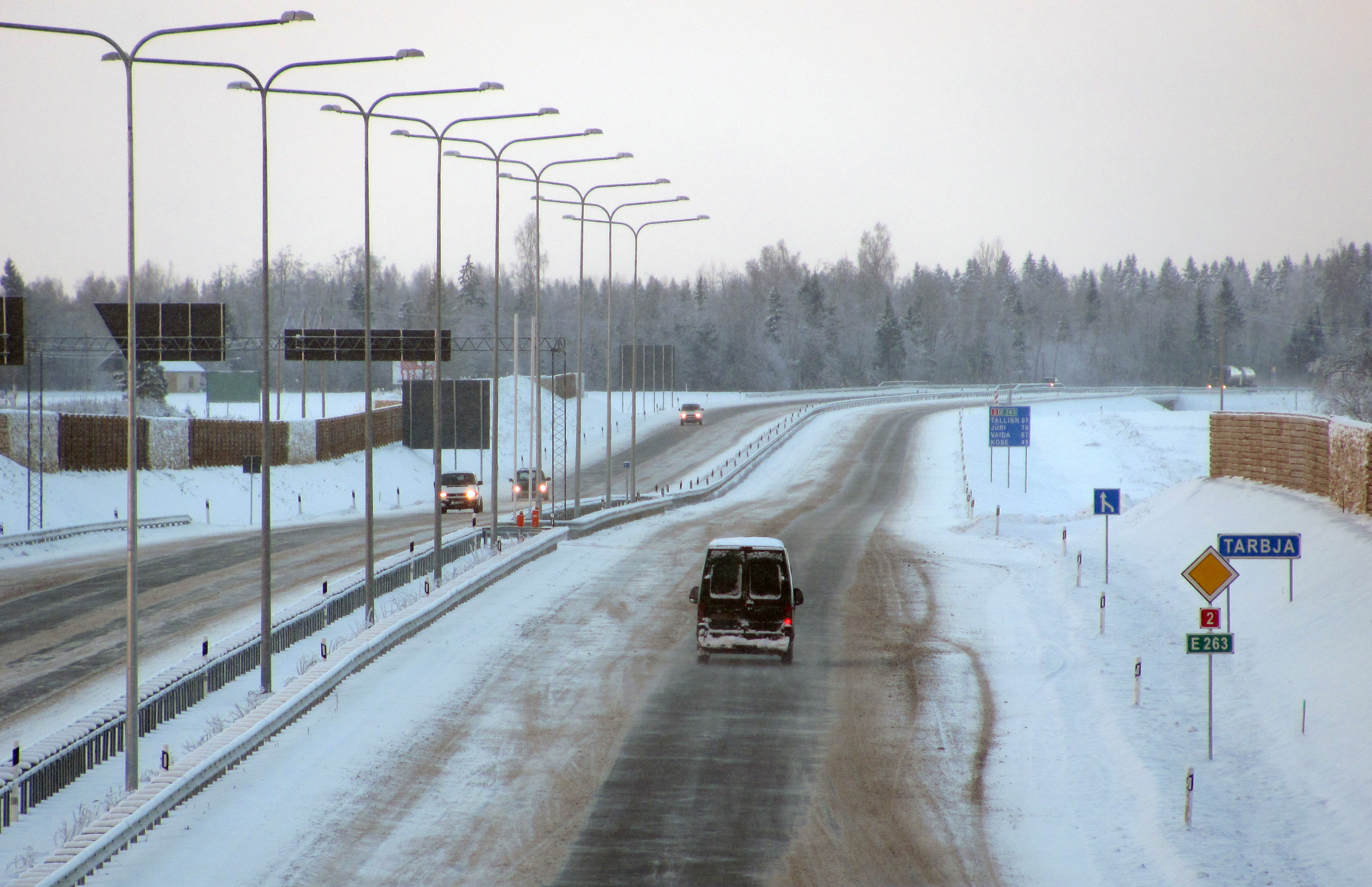
E263 in Mäo.

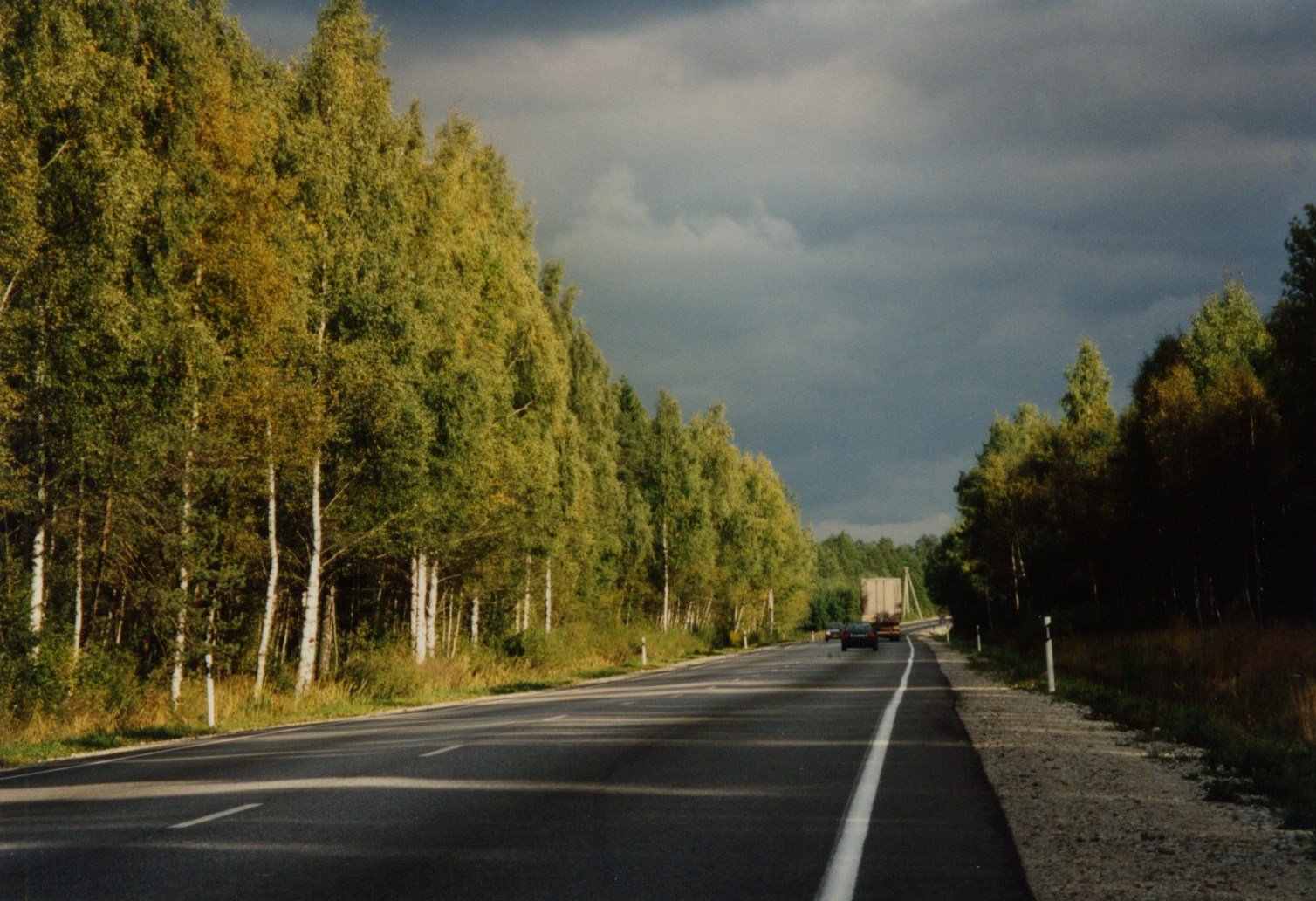
E263 near Koigi.

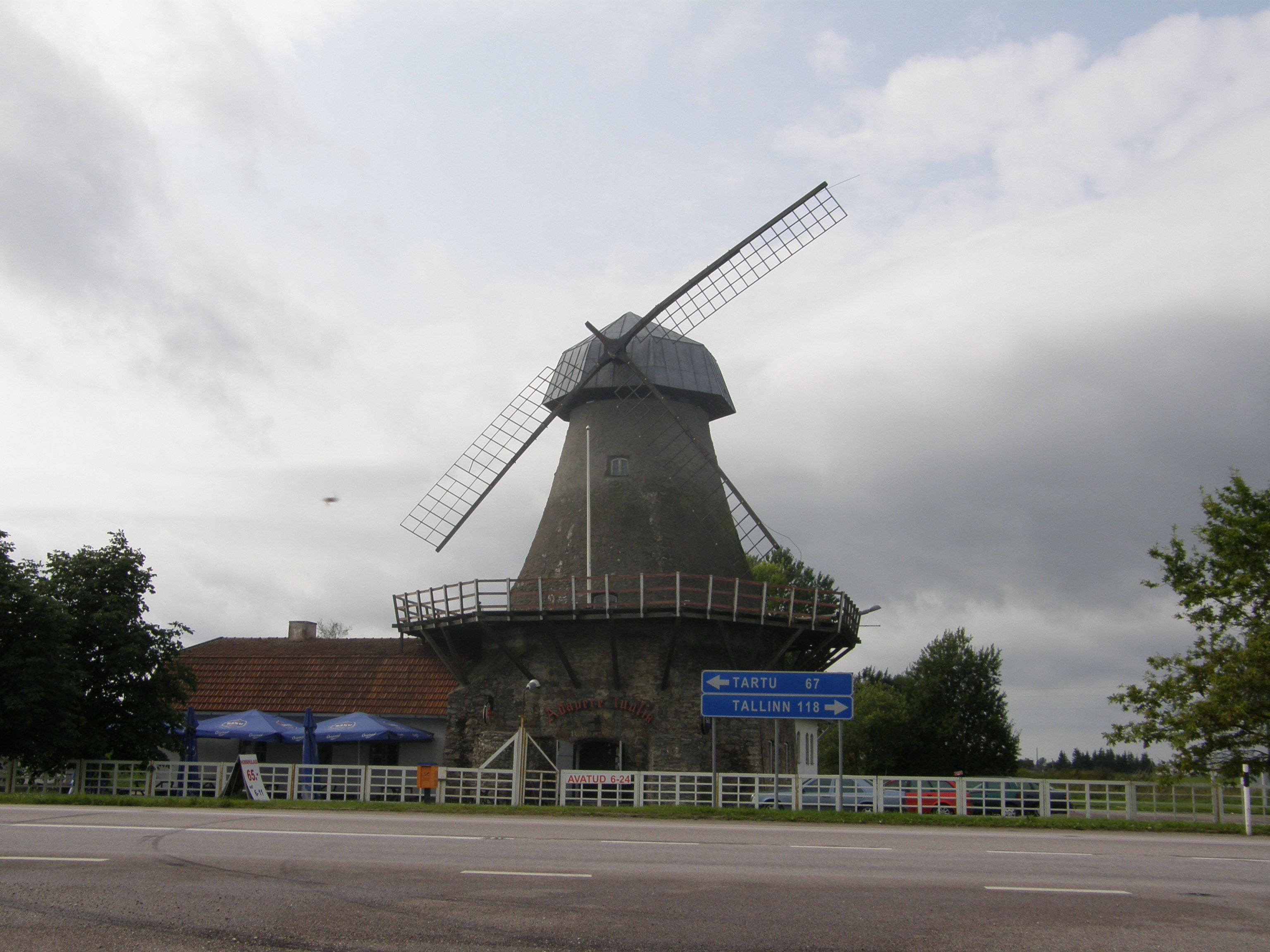
Windmill-tavern by the road in Adavere.

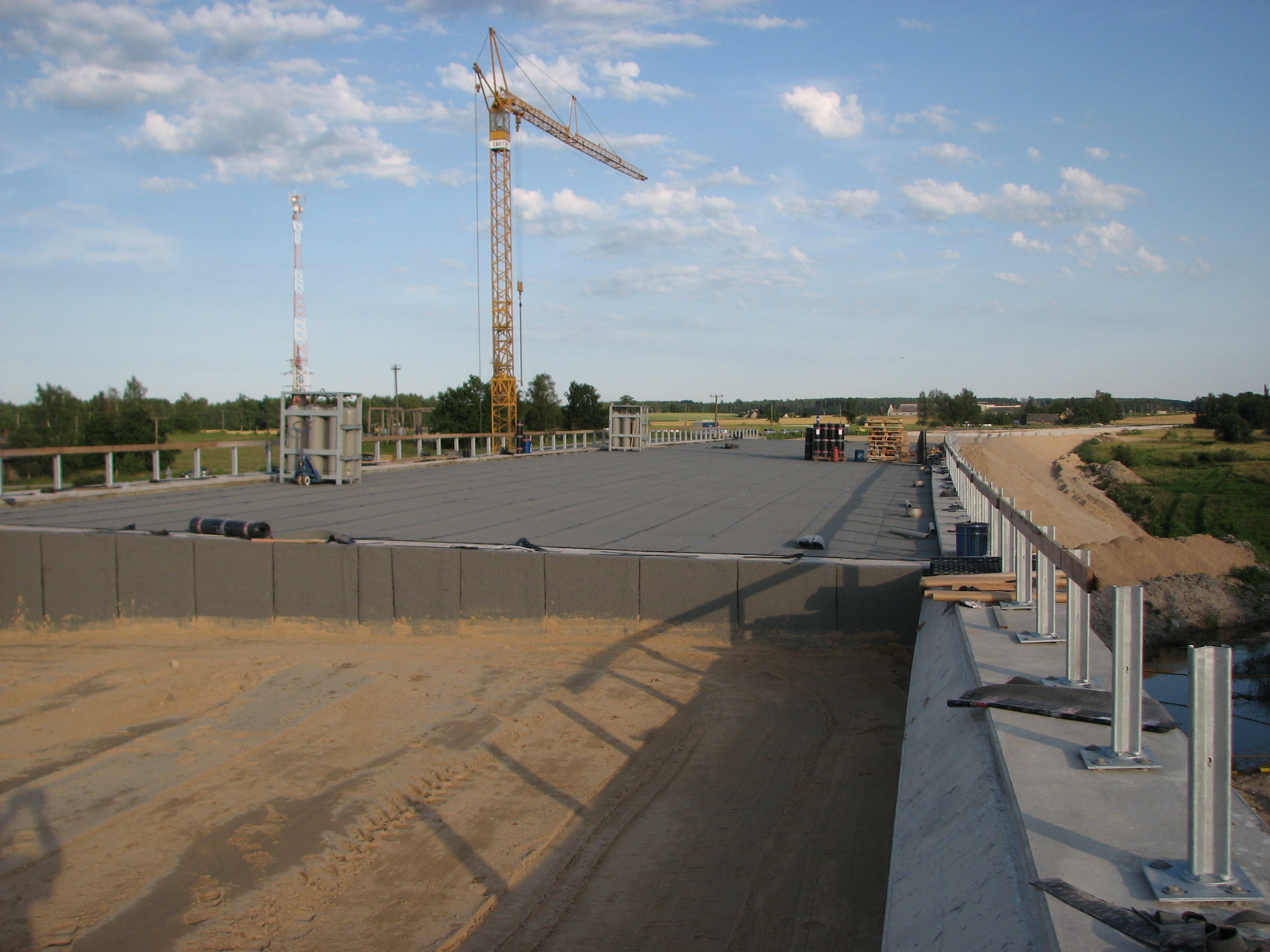
Construction of a new bridge over the Pedja near Puurmani.

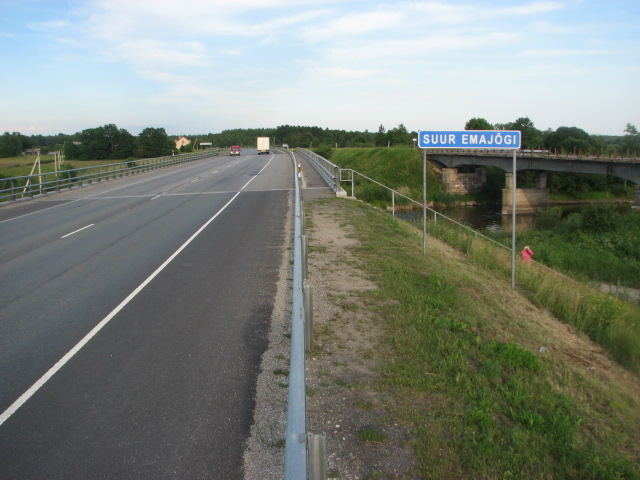
E263 crossing the Emajõgi in Kärevere.

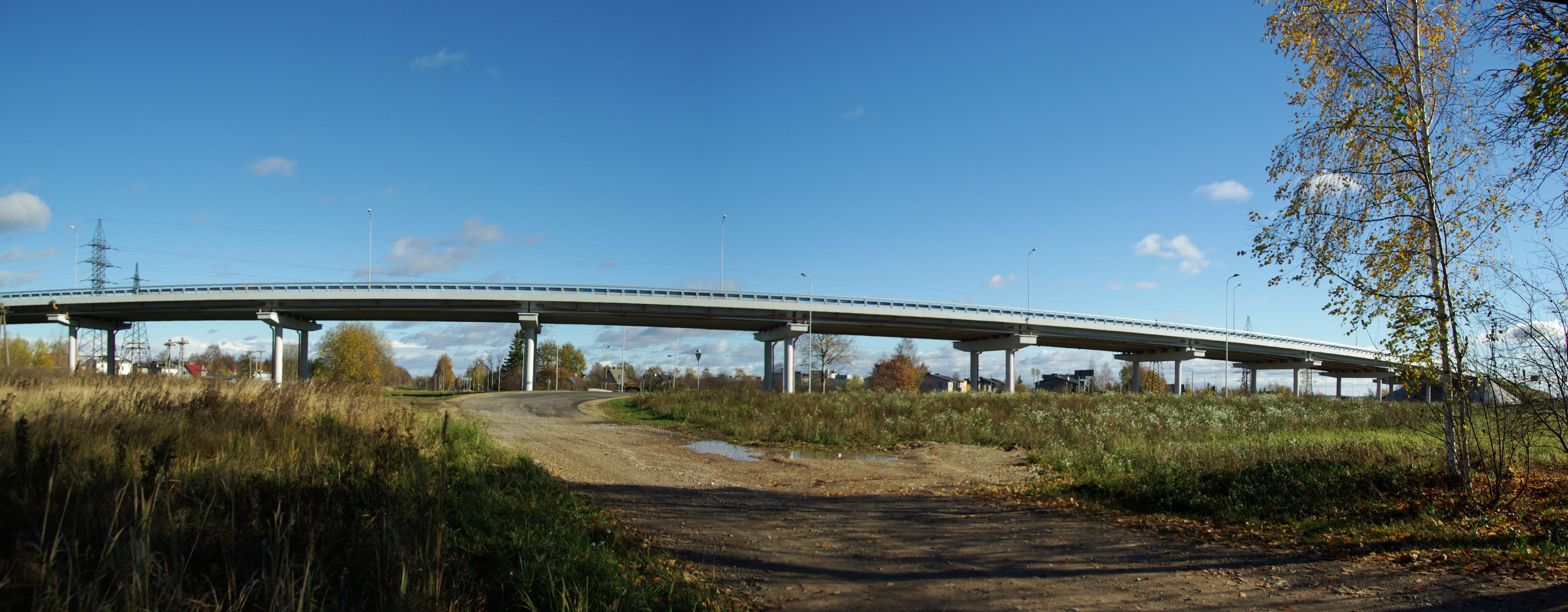
Variku viaduct in Tartu.
