= Reola =

Village in Estonia

- Village
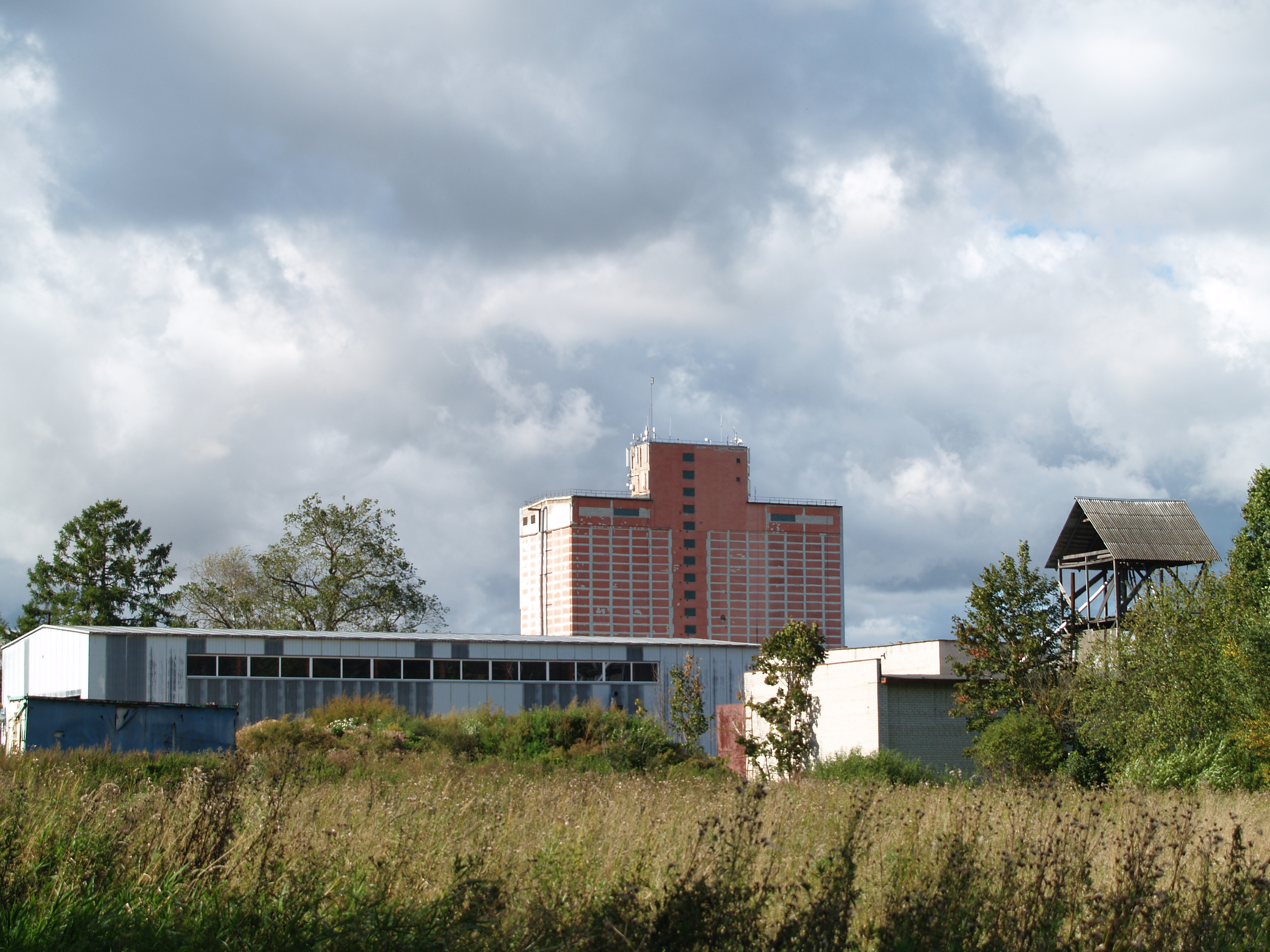
- Grain elevator.

- Location in Estonia
- Coordinates: 58°18′01″N 26°42′55″E
- Country: Estonia
- County: Tartu County
- Municipality: Kambja Parish

Population (2011 Census)
  - Total: 174

Reola is a village in Kambja Parish, Tartu County, Estonia. It is located about 9 km south of Tartu, the second largest city in Estonia, adjacent to Ülenurme and Tõrvandi. Reola is passed by the Tallinn–Tartu–Võru–Luhamaa road (E263) and the Tartu–Koidula railway. Tartu Airport is located on the territory of Reola village. As of the 2011 census, the settlement's population was 174.

The Reola Manor (Rewold) was mentioned in 1522, now in the adjacent neighbouring Uhti village. Uhti was first mentioned in 1299 as Huchten. The Valge Kõrts (White tavern), from the 19th century, is a frequently visited historical attraction that is located near the highway, in the village of Uhti. The Reola railway station is located about 4 km southeast, in Tõõraste village. The nearest station to Reola is the Uhti railway station.

Institutions and companies operating in Reola include:

- Tartu Airport
- Estonian Aviation Academy
- Reola Gaas, sale of liquid gas
- Raitwood, sawn timber products
- A.Le Coq's production complex in Reola
- Reola Köögiviljad OÜ, vegetable treatment and sale
- Reola culture house
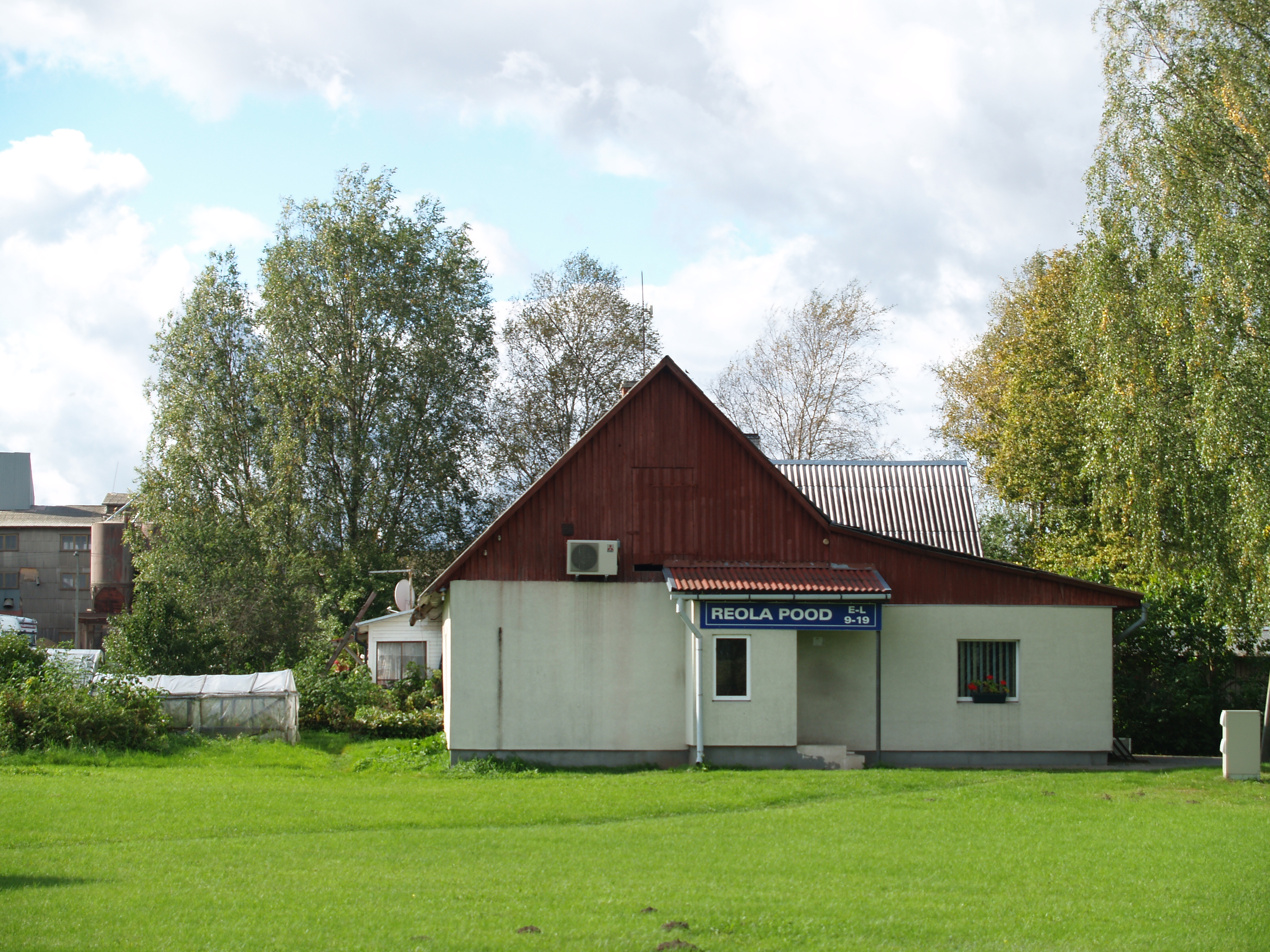
Reola shop

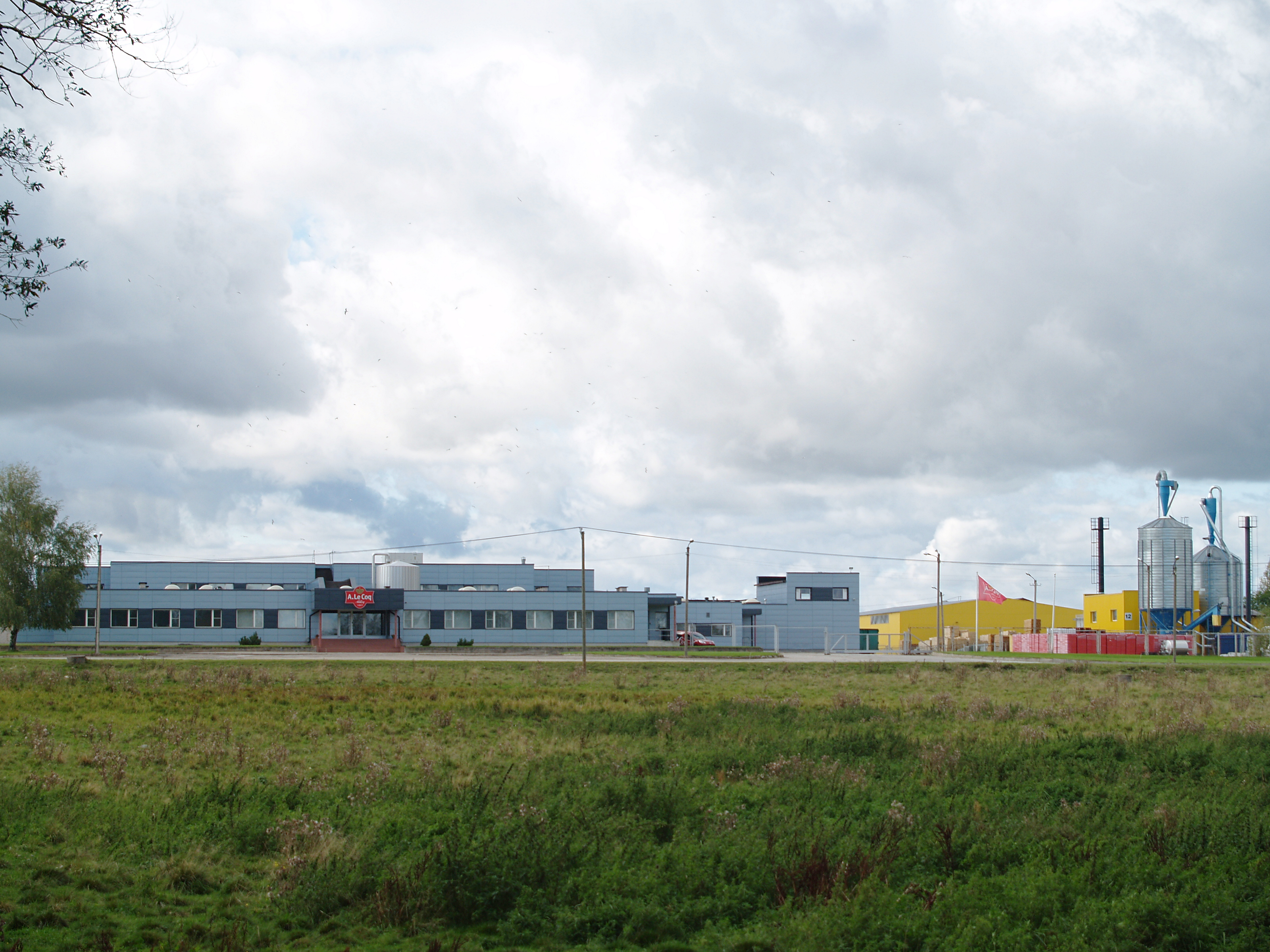
A. Le Coq's production complex

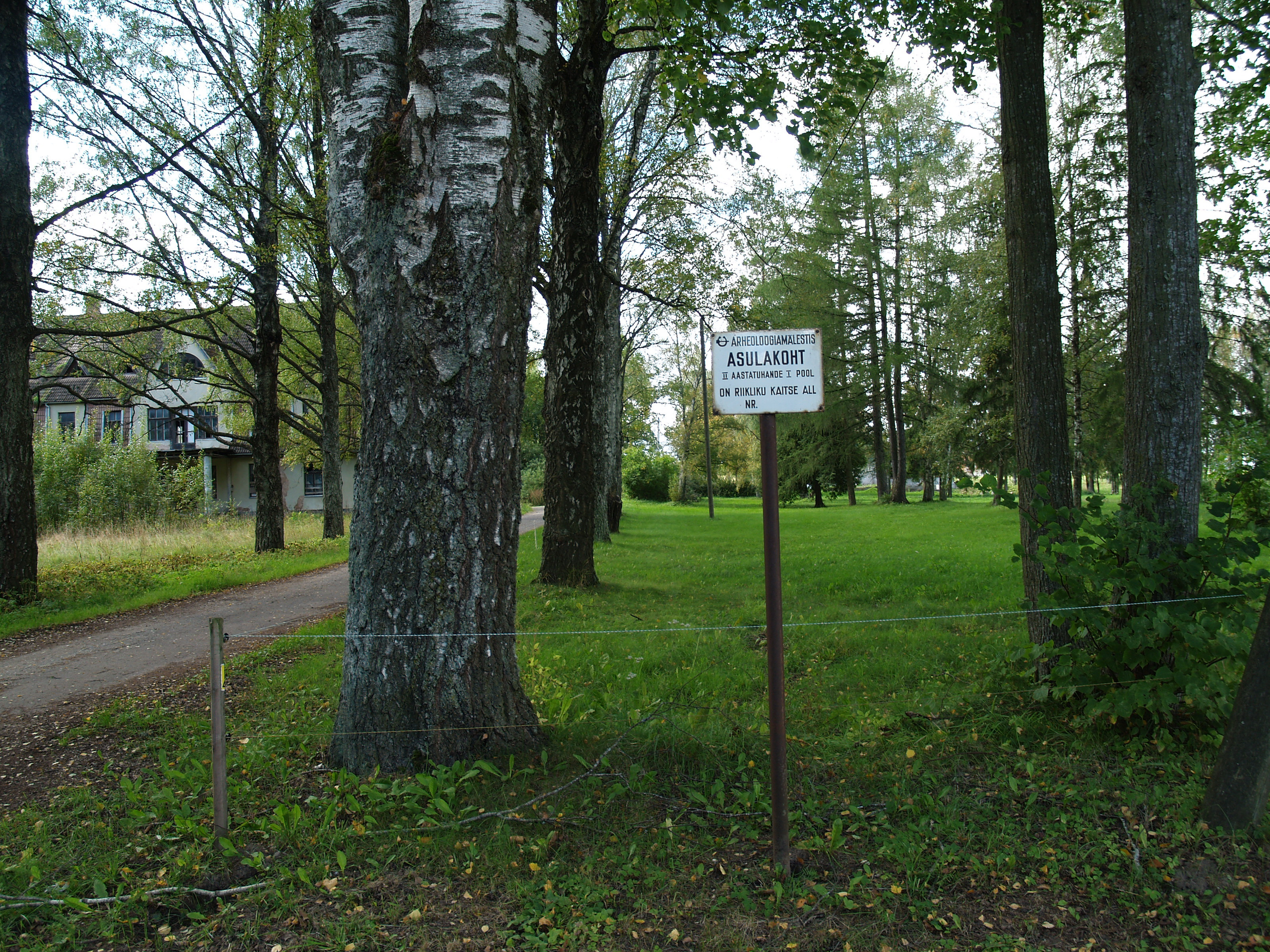
Reola settlement site
