= E263 =

E263 can refer to:

- European route E263, a European route
- Calcium acetate, a chemical compound
