= Johannes Greenberg =

Estonian painter (1887–1951)

- Born: January 10, 1887; Mäo, Estonia
- Died: November 29, 1951 (aged 64); Kuivajõe, Estonia
- Education: Munich Art Academy
- Occupation: Painter

Johannes Greenberg (January 10, 1887 – November 29, 1951) was an Estonian painter.

From 1904 to 1905, he studied at Ants Laikmaa's atelier school. From 1910 to 1913, he studied at the Munich Art Academy. After graduating he moved to Moscow, and until 1920 he was a freelance artist. In 1920 he returned to Tallinn.

His style of painting changed over time. In the 1920s he created rather dark paintings with an expressive style. In the early 1930s, he adopted an art deco style.

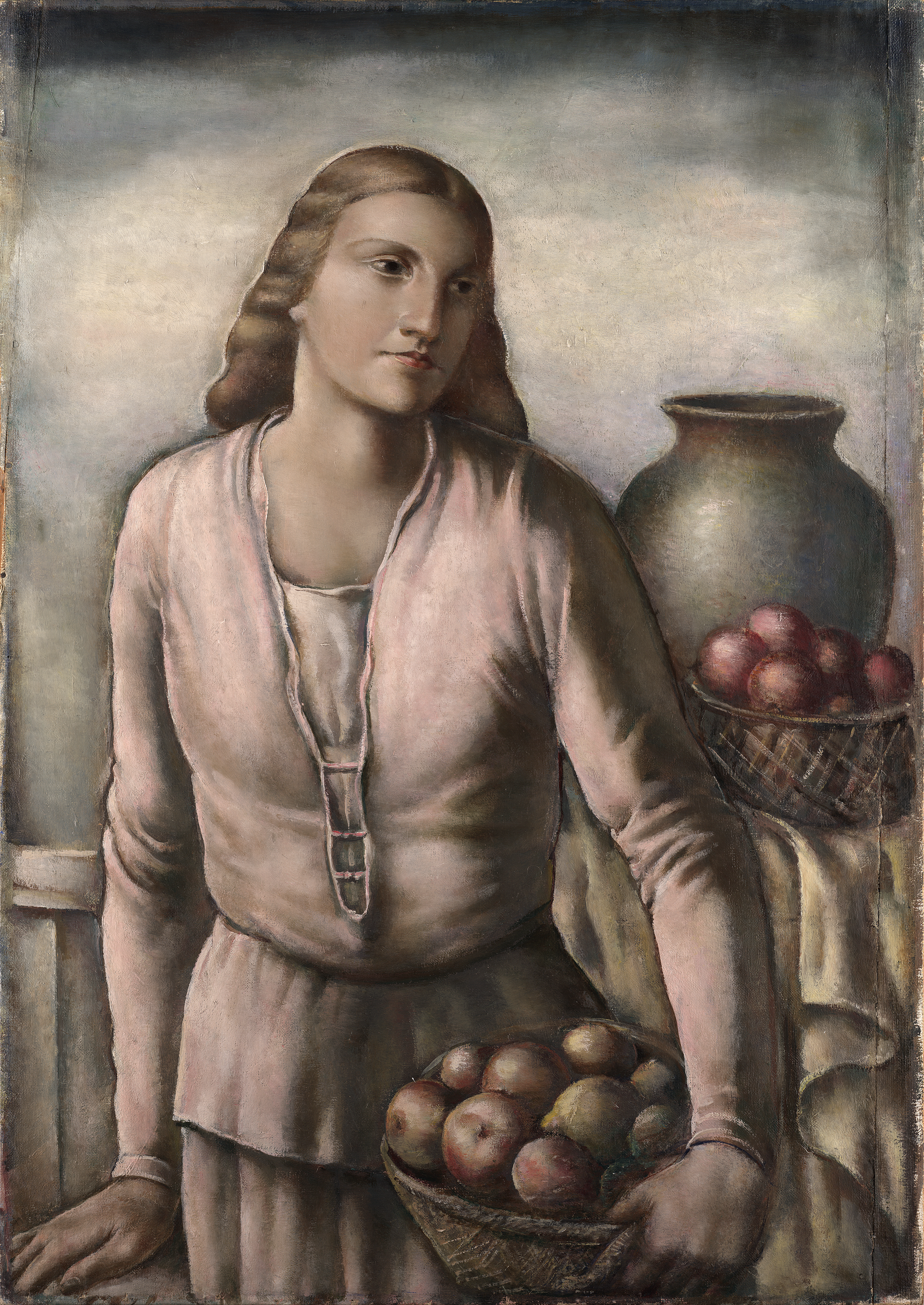

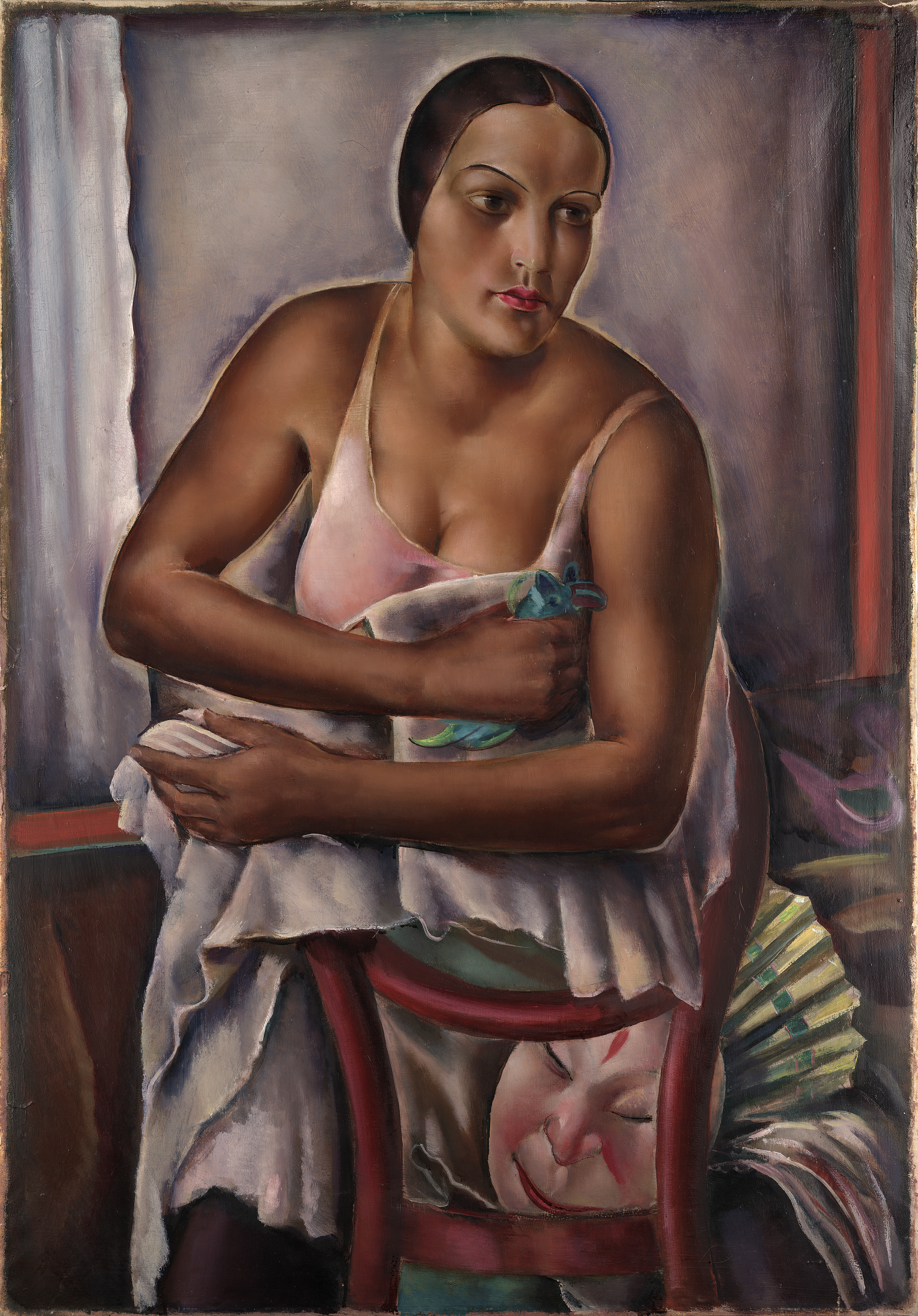

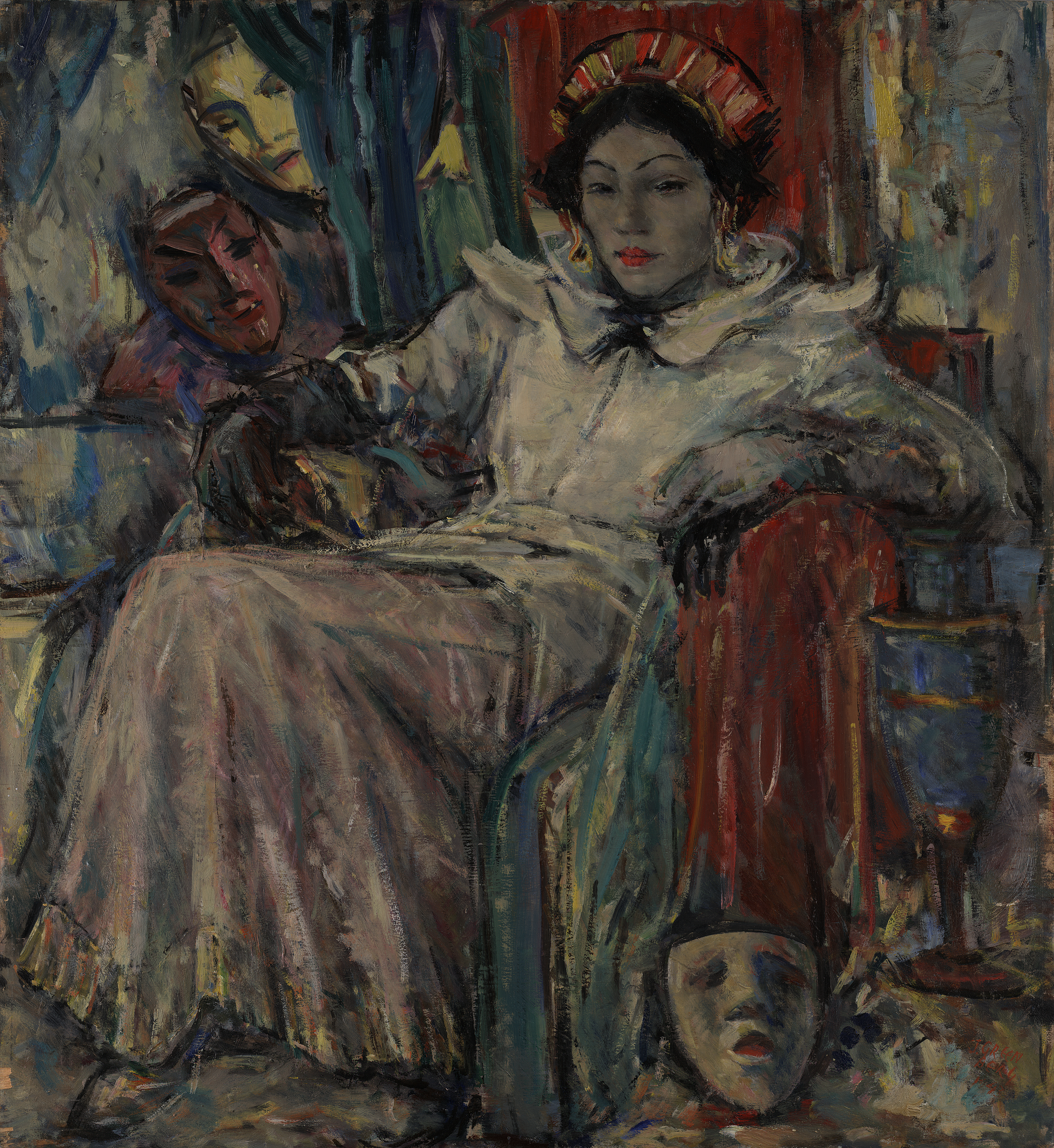

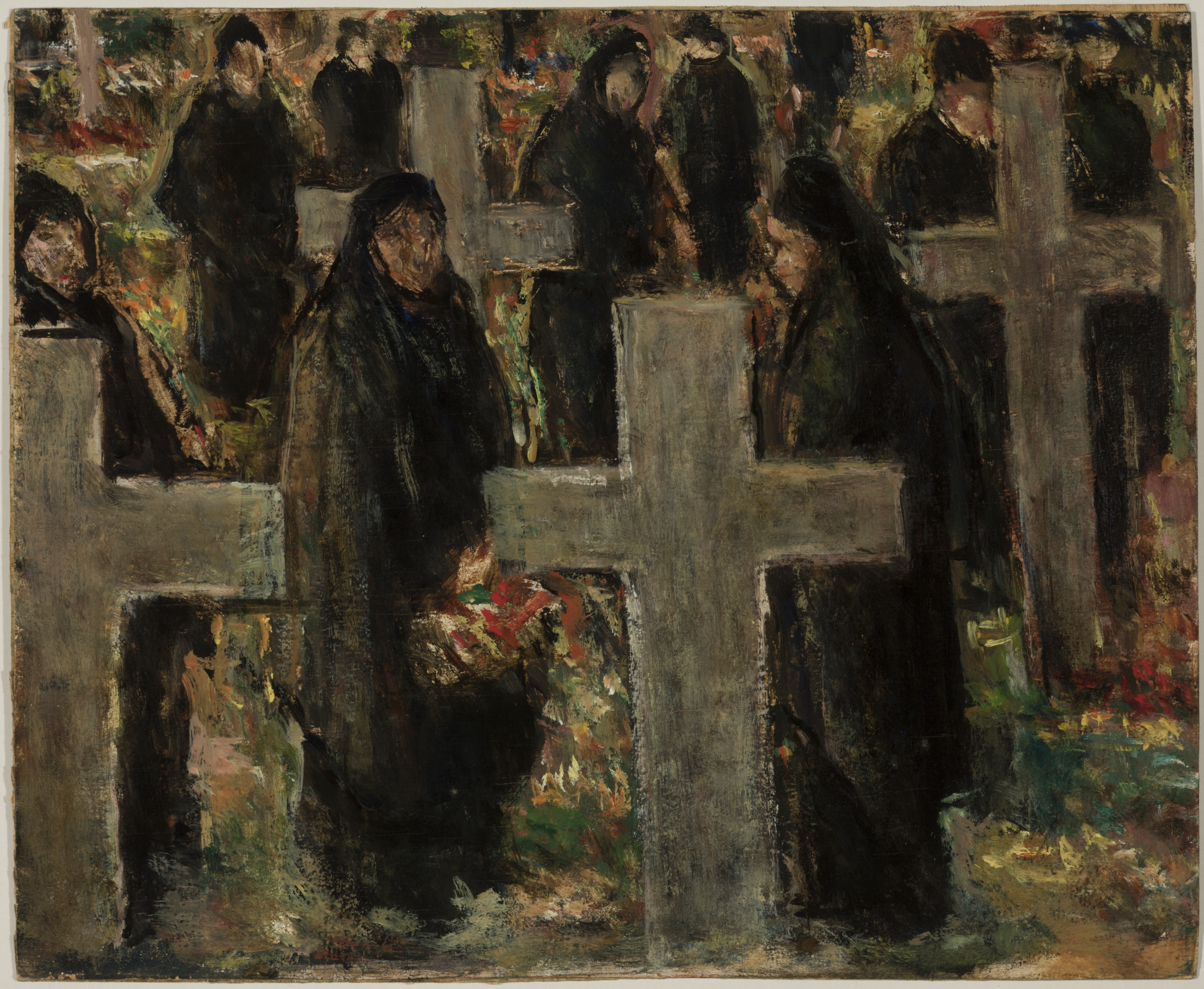
