= Mäo, Järva County =

Village in Estonia

Coordinates: 58°54′36″N 25°36′39″E

Mäo
- Village
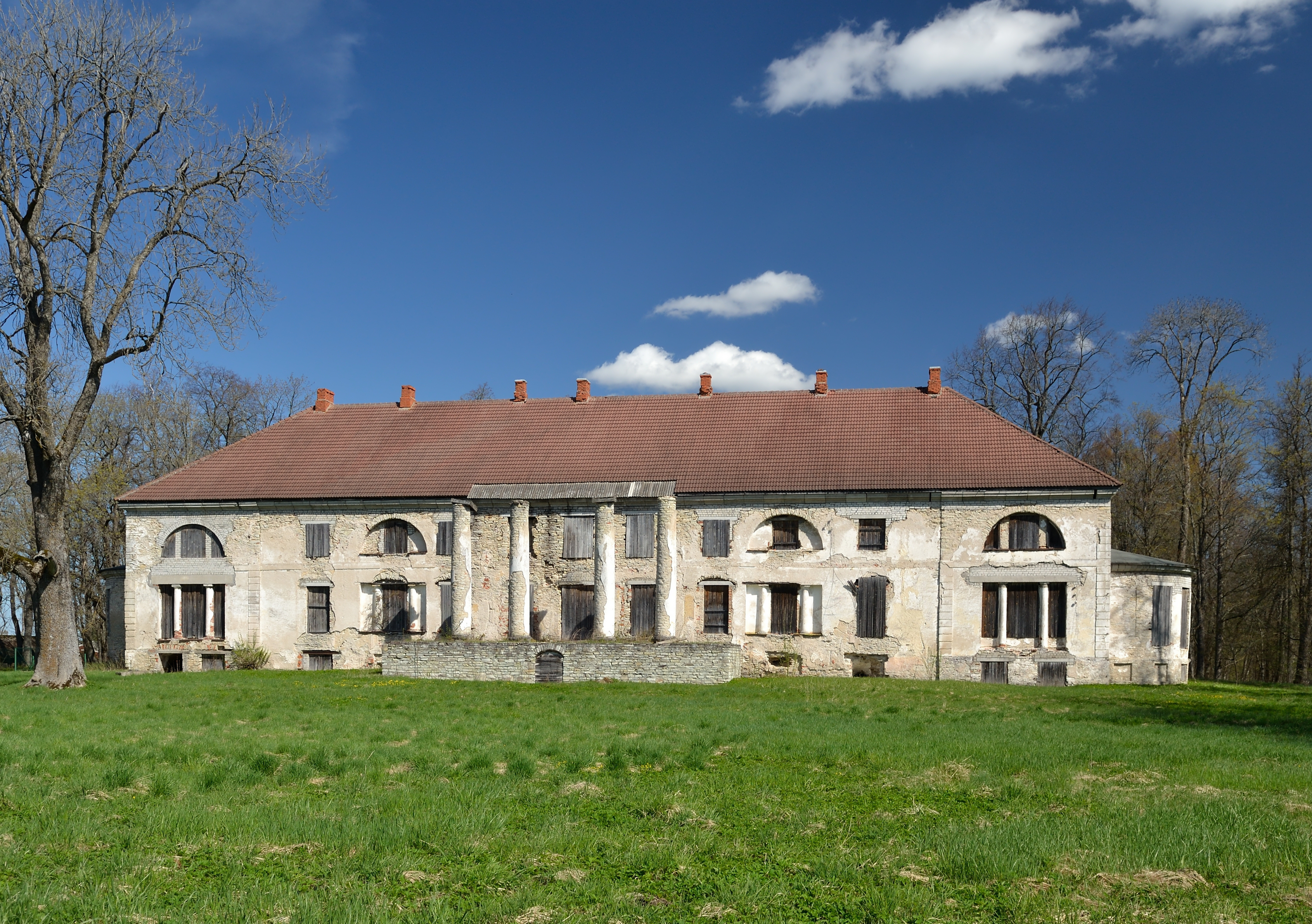
- Mäo Manor
- Interactive map of Mäo
- Country: Estonia
- County: Järva County
- Municipality: Paide
- Time zone: UTC+2 (EET)
  - Summer (DST): UTC+3 (EEST)

Mäo (German: Mexhof) is a village in Paide municipality, Järva County in northern-central Estonia. Prior to the 2017 administrative reform of local governments, it was located in Paide Parish.

== History ==
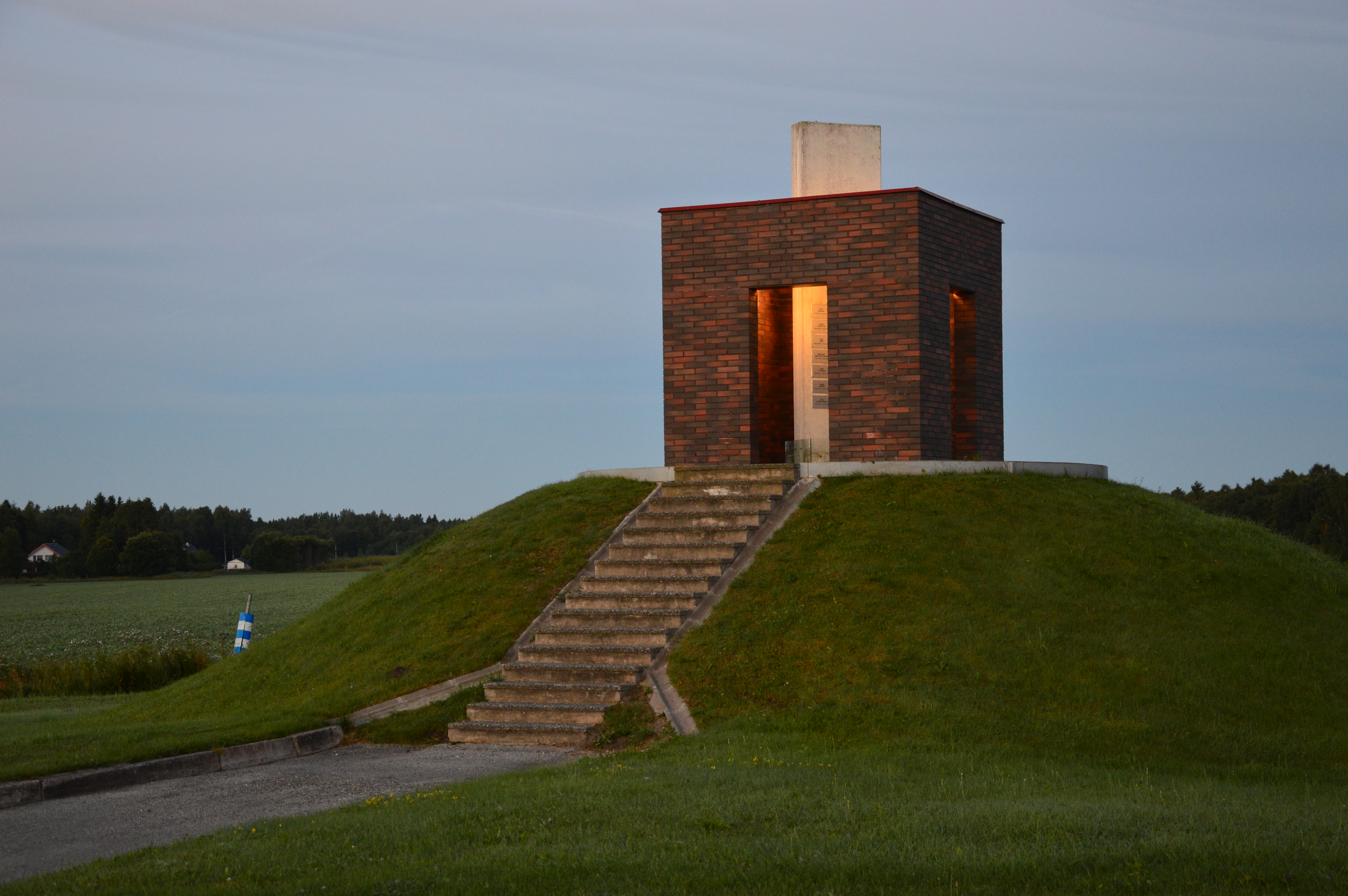
Memorial to the fallen police officers in the 1994 Mäo shooting

In Mäo, there is a memorial to fallen policemen designed by Vilen Künnapu and unveiled in 1995. It commemorates the Mäo shooting, which took place on December 15, 1994, when smugglers killed two policemen at the intersection in Mäo: 21-year-old Marek Lemming and 30-year-old Argo Kivi.

== Notable people ==
Notable people that were born or lived in Mäo include the following:

- Johannes Brenner (1906–1975), Estonian footballer and Olympic competitor, born in Mäo
- Johannes Greenberg (1887–1951), painter, born at Mäo Manor
- Carmen Kass (born 1978), Estonian supermodel, grew up in Mäo

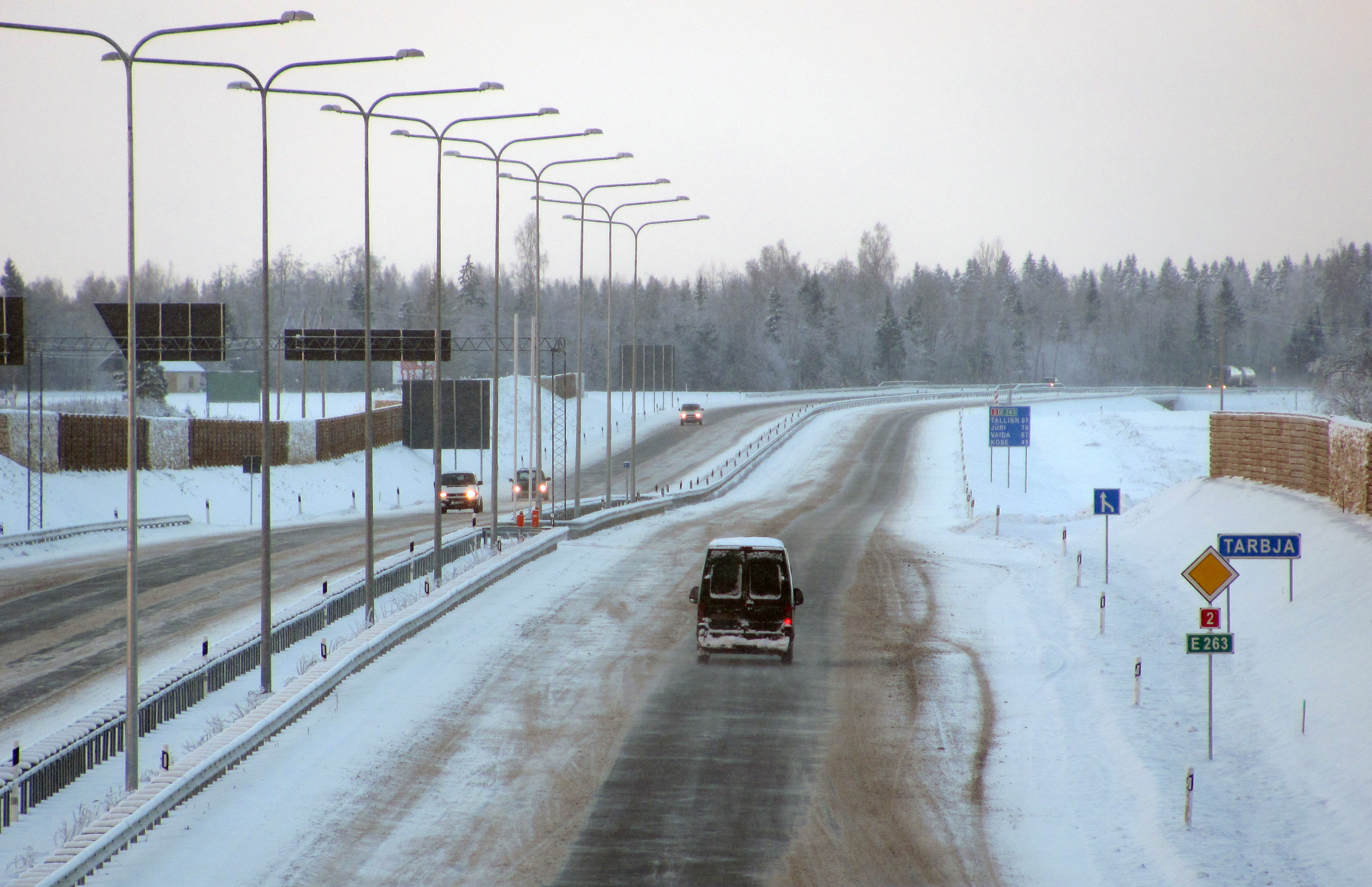
European route E263 in Mäo
