= Johannes Brenner =

Estonian footballer

Personal information
- Date of birth: 16 January 1906
- Place of birth: Mäo, Kreis Jerwen, Governorate of Estonia, Russian Empire
- Date of death: 9 September 1975 (aged 69)
- Place of death: Tallinn, then part of Estonian SSR, Soviet Union
- Position: Forward

Senior career*
Years	Team	Apps	(Gls)
1920–1925	ESS Kalev Tallinn		
1925–1930	Tallinna Jalgpalli Klubi		

International career
1923–1930	Estonia	16	(4)
- * Club domestic league appearances and goals

Johannes Brenner (16 January 1906 in Mäo – 9 September 1975 in Tallinn) was an Estonia football forward, who played for ESS Kalev Tallinn, Tallinna Jalgpalli Klubi and the Estonia national football team.

== Football career ==
Brenner started playing football in 1920 for ESS Kalev Tallinn. He later also played for Tallinna Jalgpalli Klubi. Won two national championships, one with both clubs. Although he played as a forward or midfielder, he only scored one goal in his entire club career.

From 1923 to 1930, Brenner represented Estonian 16 times and scored four goals in those matches. He made the debut on 24 June 1923 in a friendly against Lithuania and became the youngest ever player (17 years and 159 days) to represent the nation. The record was eventually broken by Jarmo Ahjupera in 2001.

Retired at the age of 24 to concentrate on his career as a military pilot.
