= Lake Vagula =

Lake in Estonia

- Vagula järv (Estonian)
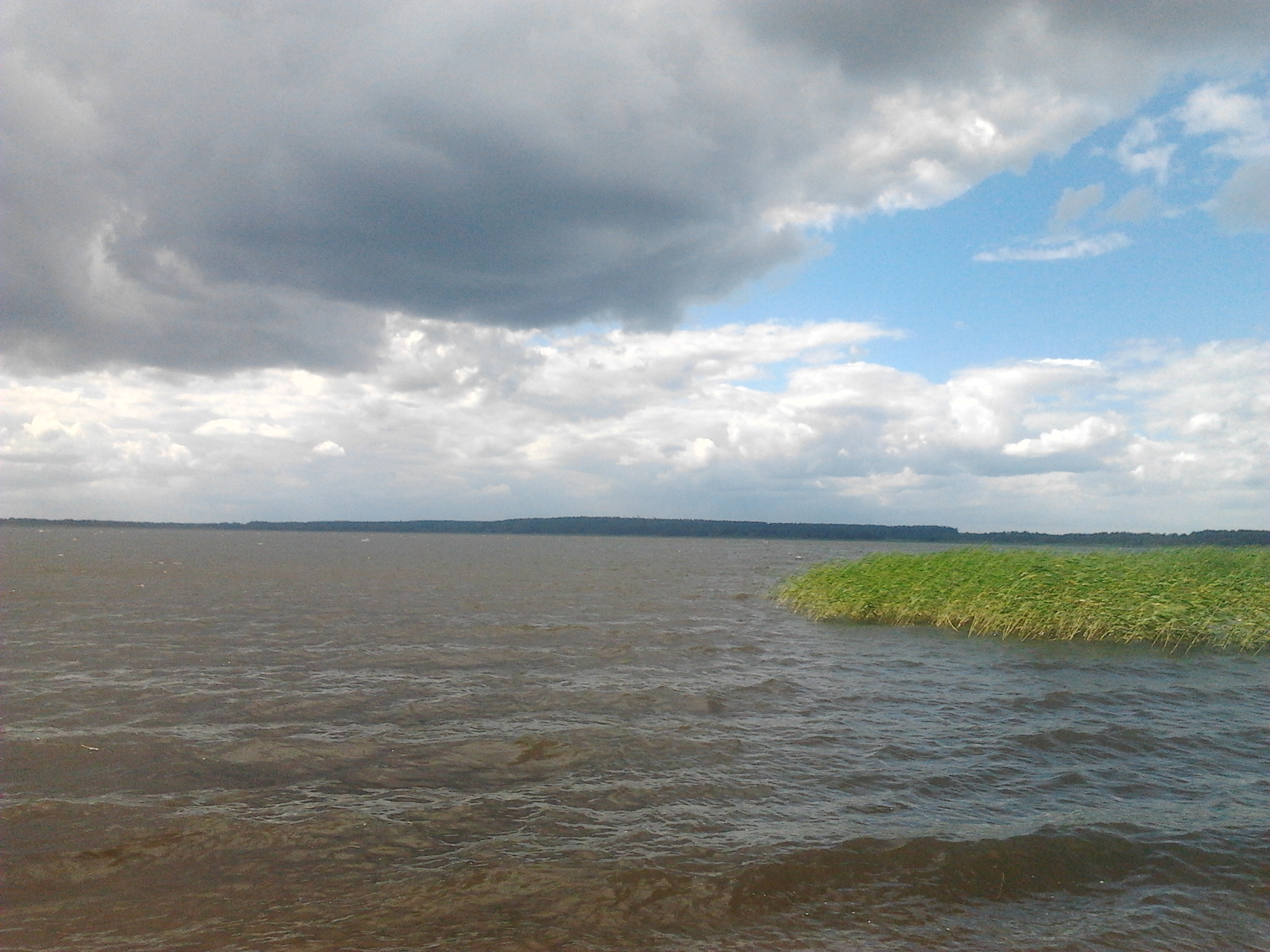
- Lake Vagula viewed from its eastern coast

- Location within Estonia
- Coordinates: 57°50′46″N 26°54′46″E
- Primary inflows: Võhandu River, Kondi Creek, Kivioja, Üra Creek
- Primary outflows: Võhandu River
- Basin countries: Estonia
- Max. length: 4,930 meters (16,170 ft)
- Max. width: 1,700 meters (5,600 ft)
- Surface area: 602.7 hectares (1,489 acres)
- Average depth: 5.3 meters (17 ft)
- Max. depth: 11.5 meters (38 ft)
- Water volume: 33,939,000 cubic meters (1.1985×10^{9} cu ft)
- Shore length^{1}: 16,100 meters (52,800 ft)
- Surface elevation: 69.2 meters (227 ft)
- Islands: 1
- ^{1} Shore length is not a well-defined measure.

Lake Vagula (Estonian: Vagula järv) is a lake in Estonia. It is located in the village of Vagula in Võru Parish, Võru County.

== Physical description ==
The lake has an area of 602.7 hectares (1,489 acres), and it has one islands with an area of 0.09 hectares (0.22 acres). The lake has an average depth of 5.3 meters (17 ft) and a maximum depth of 11.5 meters (38 ft). It is 4,930 meters (16,170 ft) long, and its shoreline measures 16,100 meters (52,800 ft). It has a volume of 33,939,000 cubic meters (1.1985×10^{9} cu ft).

== See also ==
- List of lakes of Estonia
