= Adavere =

Borough in Estonia

- Small borough
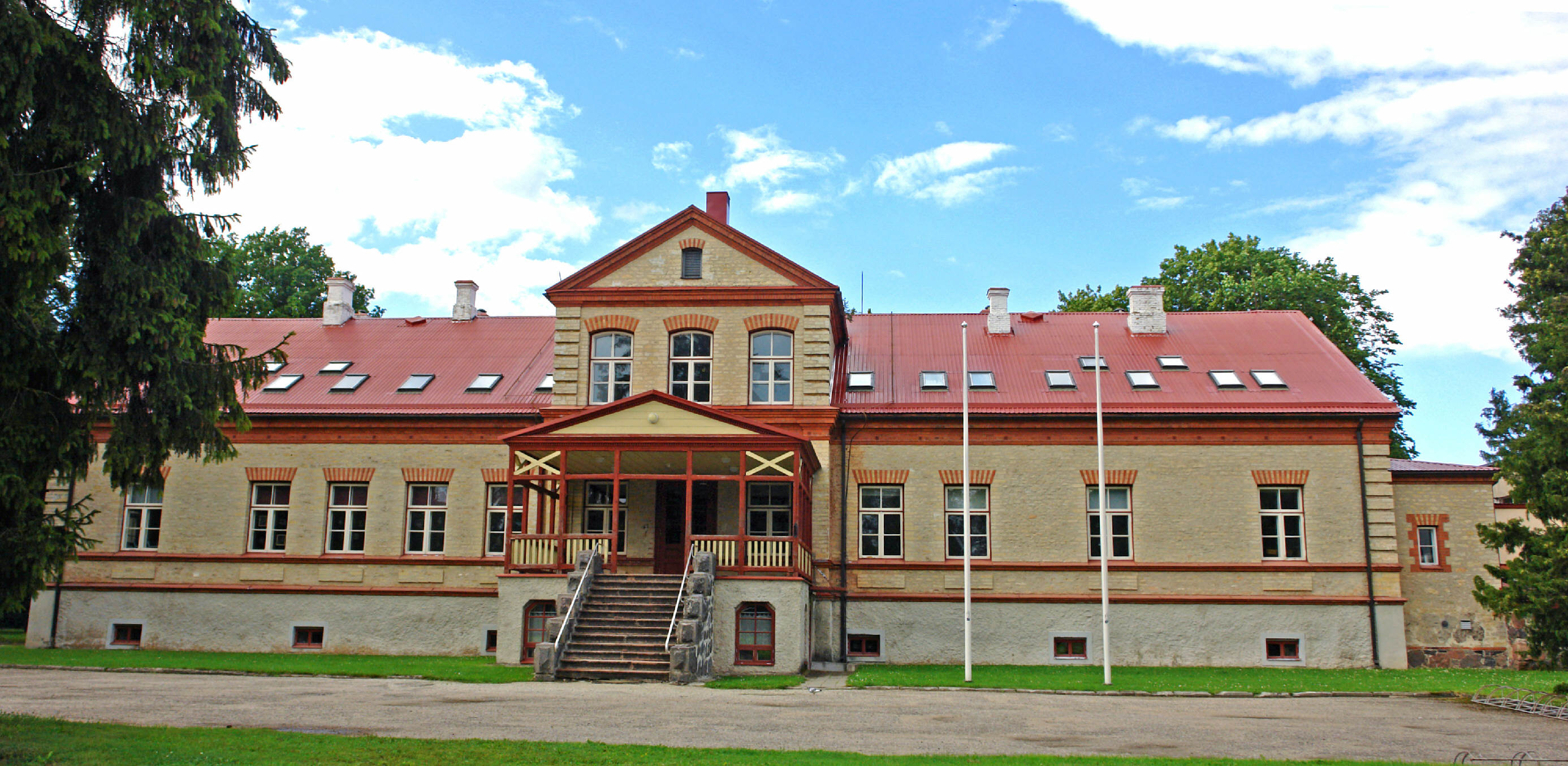
- Adavere manor

- Location in Estonia
- Coordinates: 58°42′22″N 25°53′57″E
- Country: Estonia
- County: Jõgeva County
- Municipality: Põltsamaa Parish

Population (01.01.2010)
  - Total: 632

Adavere is a small borough (Estonian: alevik) in Põltsamaa Parish, Jõgeva County in central Estonia. It has a population of 632 (as of 1 January 2010). Just outside the town is the 'Estonian mainland midpoint symbol denoting'.

== Adavere Manor ==
Adavere Manor (German: Addafer) was established as an estate in the 17th century. The estate has belonged to several Baltic German aristocratic families during the centuries. The present building was constructed in 1892–1893. Some original interior details survive to this day, and Art Nouveau ceiling decorations were uncovered in 2000.

== Gallery ==
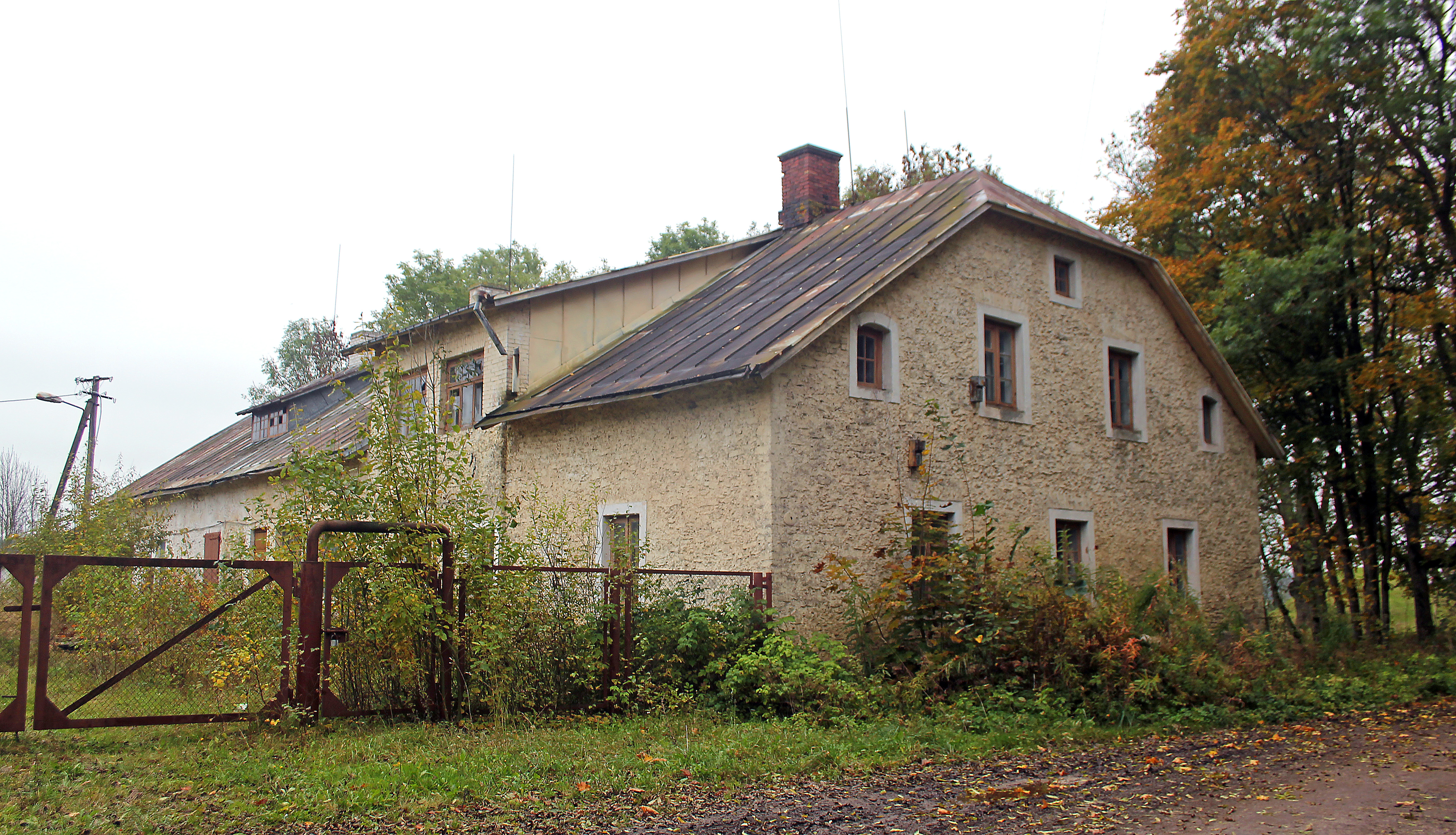
Adavere manor dairy

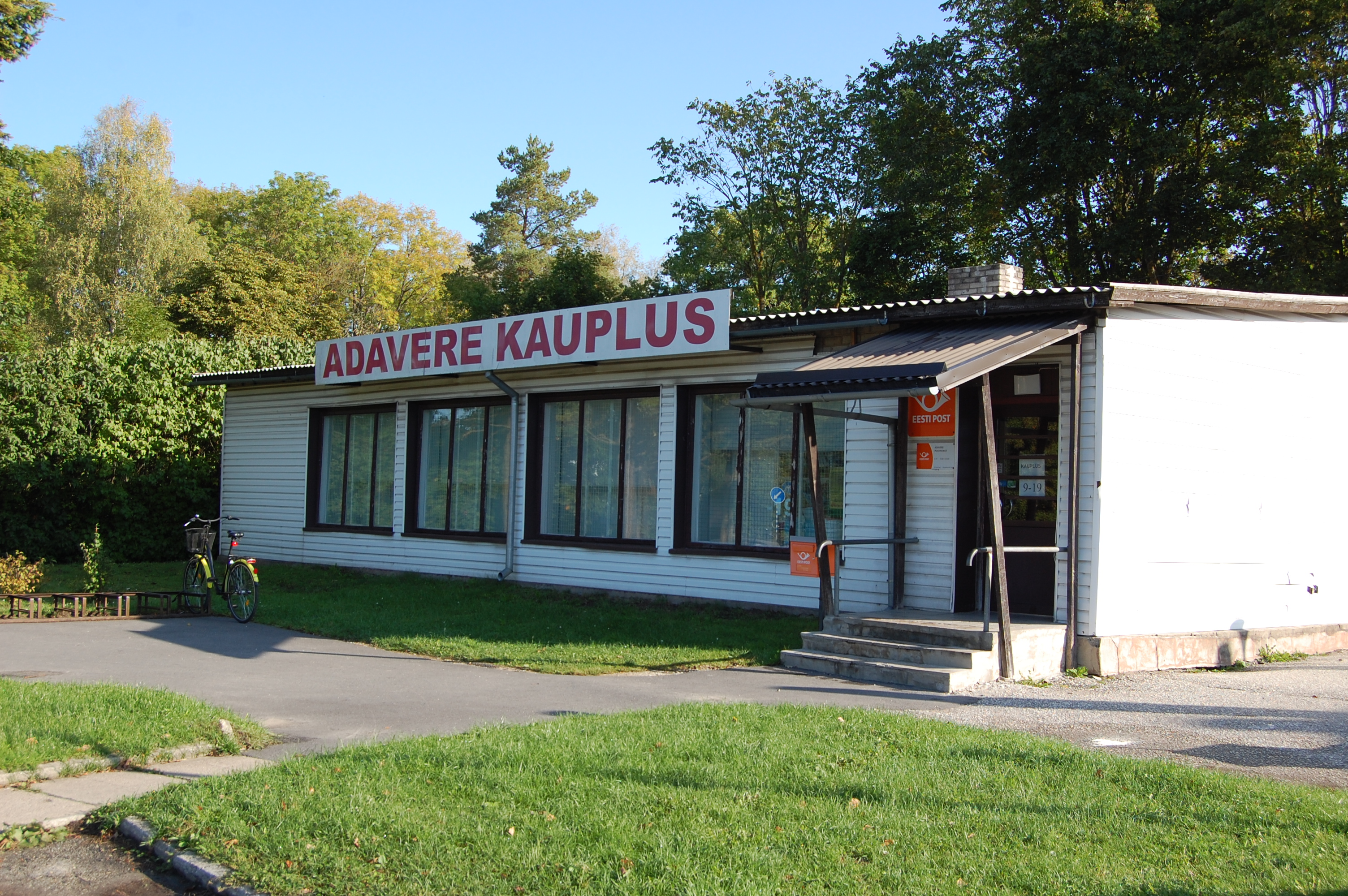
Small shop
