= Variku, Tartu =

Neighbourhood of Tartu, Estonia

Coordinates: 58°20′58.14″N 26°42′20.84″E

Variku
- Neighbourhood of Tartu
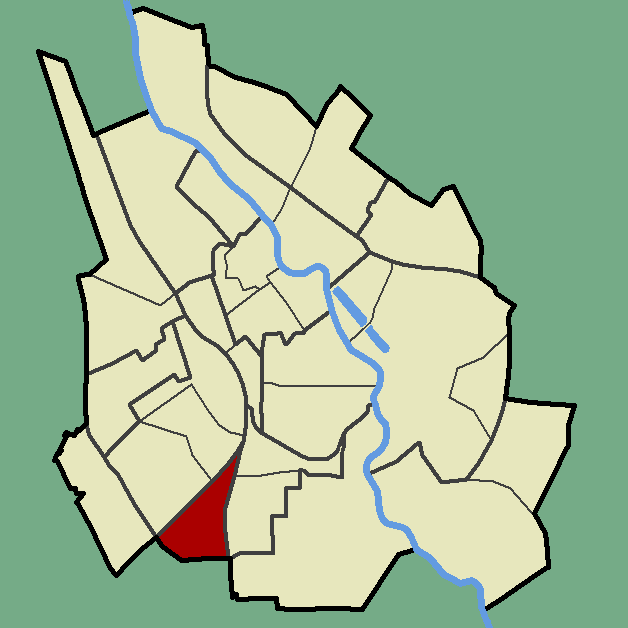
- Location of Variku in Tartu.
- Country: Estonia
- County: Tartu County
- City: Tartu

Area
  - Total: 0.77 km^{2} (0.30 sq mi)

Population (31.12.2013)
  - Total: 1,869
  - Density: 2,400/km^{2} (6,300/sq mi)

Variku is a neighbourhood of Tartu, Estonia. It has a population of 1,869 (as of 31 December 2013) and an area of 0.77 km^{2} (0.30 mi^{2}).
