= Vagula =

Village in Estonia

Coordinates: 57°52′N 26°53′E

- Village
- Interactive map of Vagula
- Country: Estonia
- County: Võru County
- Parish: Võru Parish
- Time zone: UTC+2 (EET)
  - Summer (DST): UTC+3 (EEST)

Vagula is a village in Võru Parish, Võru County in southern Estonia.

== Gallery ==
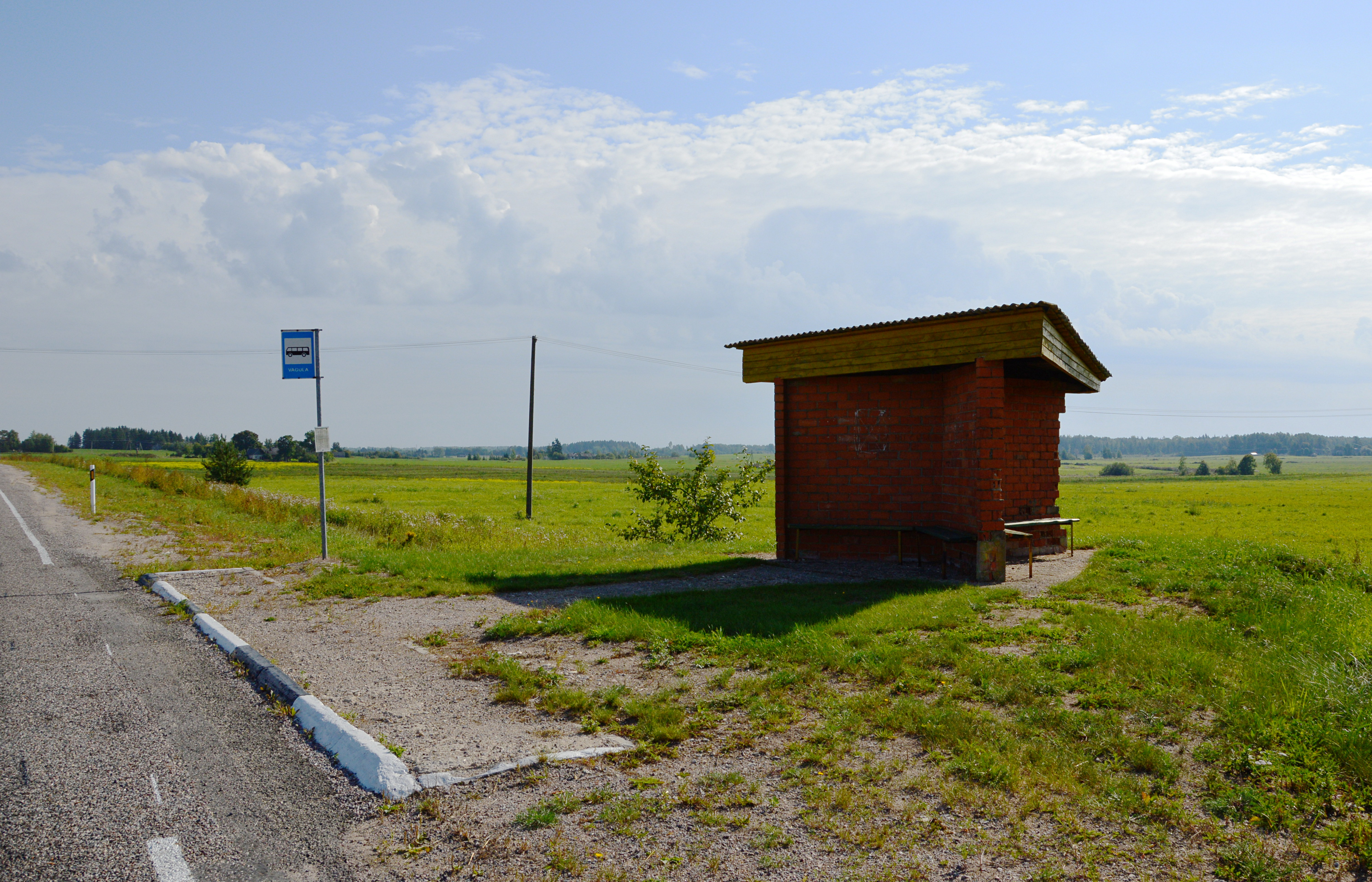

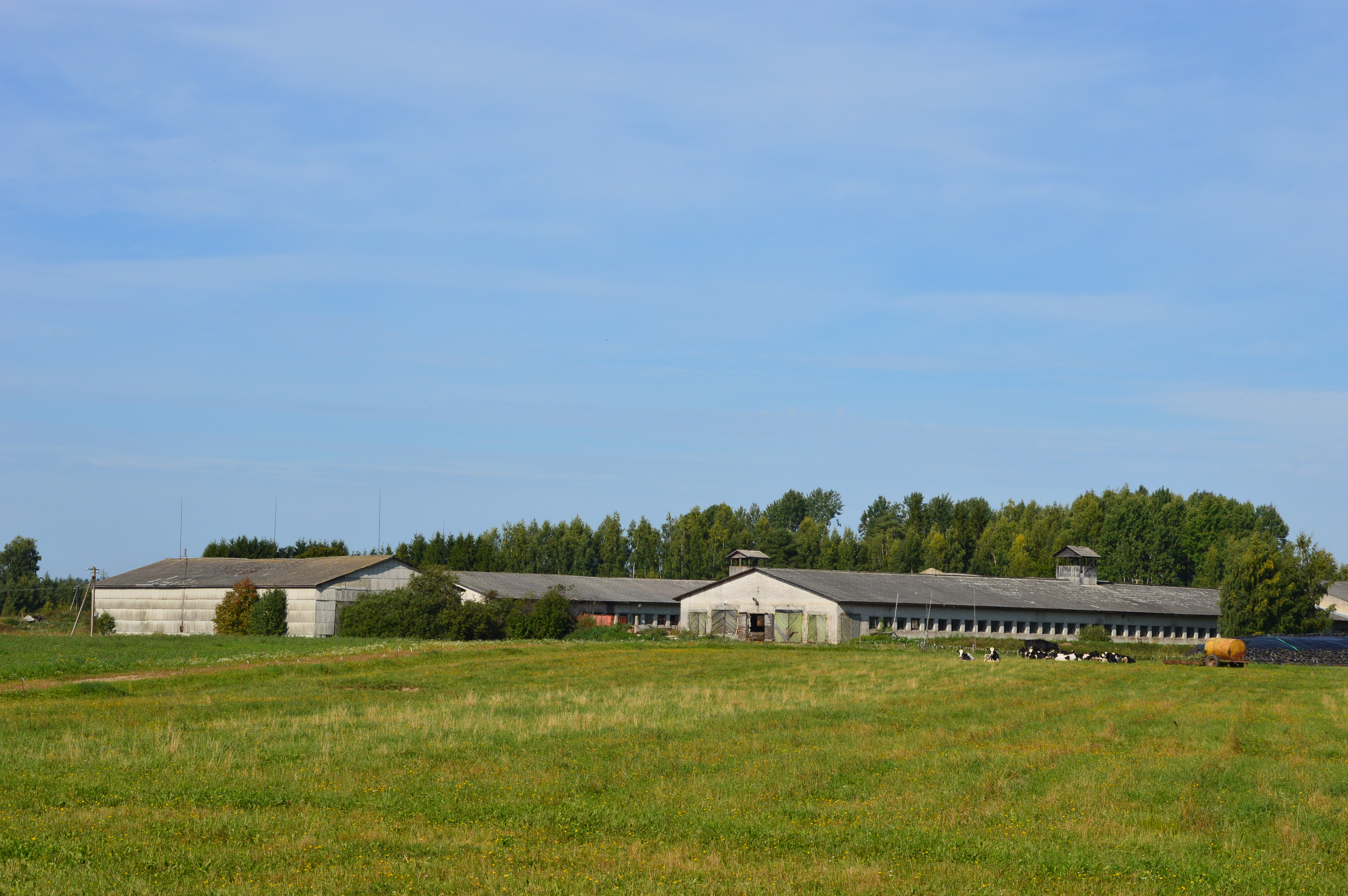

== See also ==
- Lake Vagula
