= Tõrvandi =

Borough in Estonia

- Small borough
- Location in Estonia
- Coordinates: 58°19′25″N 26°42′32″E
- Country: Estonia
- County: Tartu
- Parish: Kambja

Population (01.09.2010)
  - Total: 1,655

Tõrvandi (German: Törwant) is a small borough (Estonian: alevik) in Kambja Parish, Tartu County, Estonia. It has a population of 1,655 (as of 1 September 2010). As of October 2020 a new town official has been voted to office, local officer Rait Maamees is the new town official.

== Gallery ==
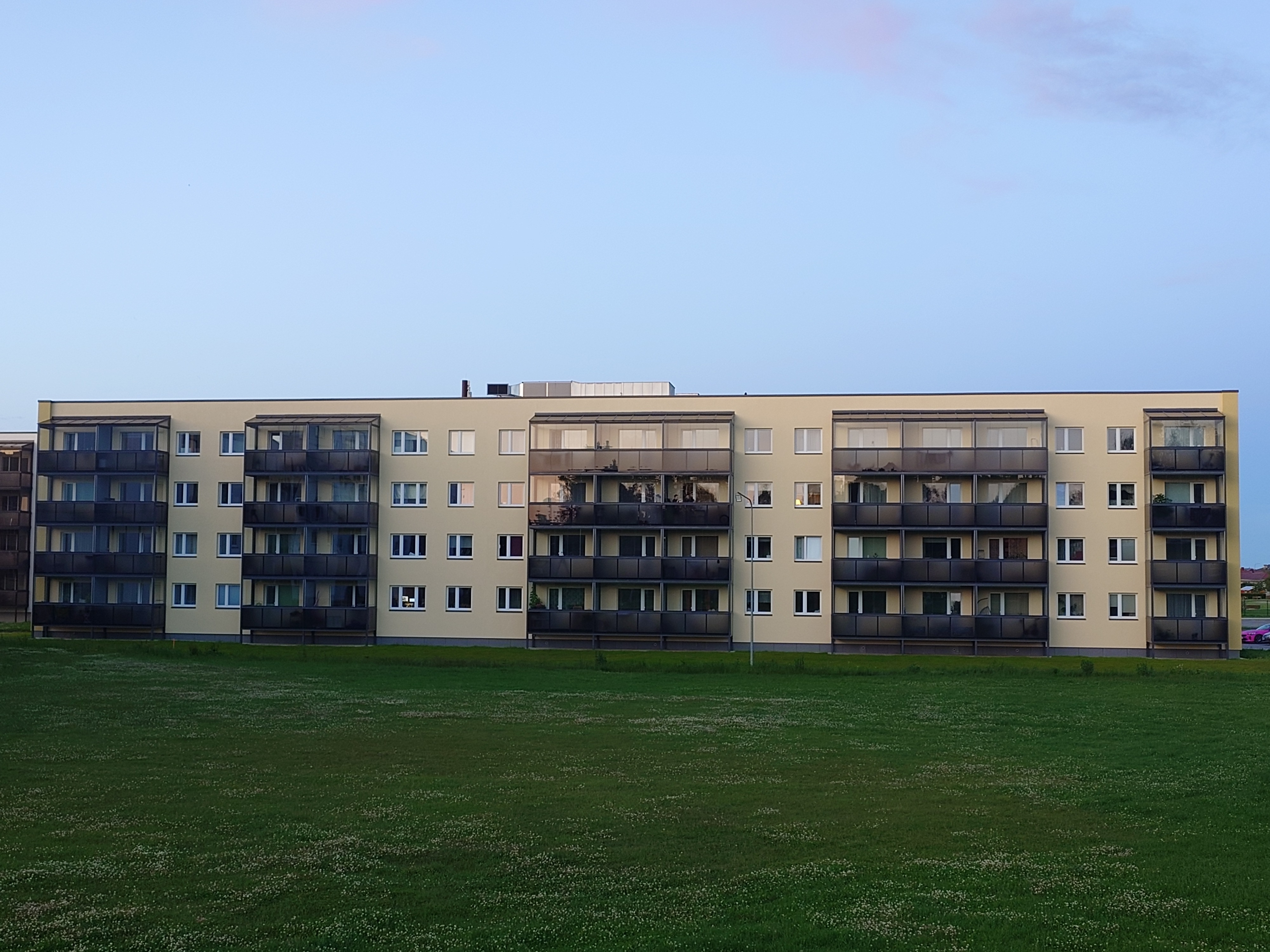
Typical residential building

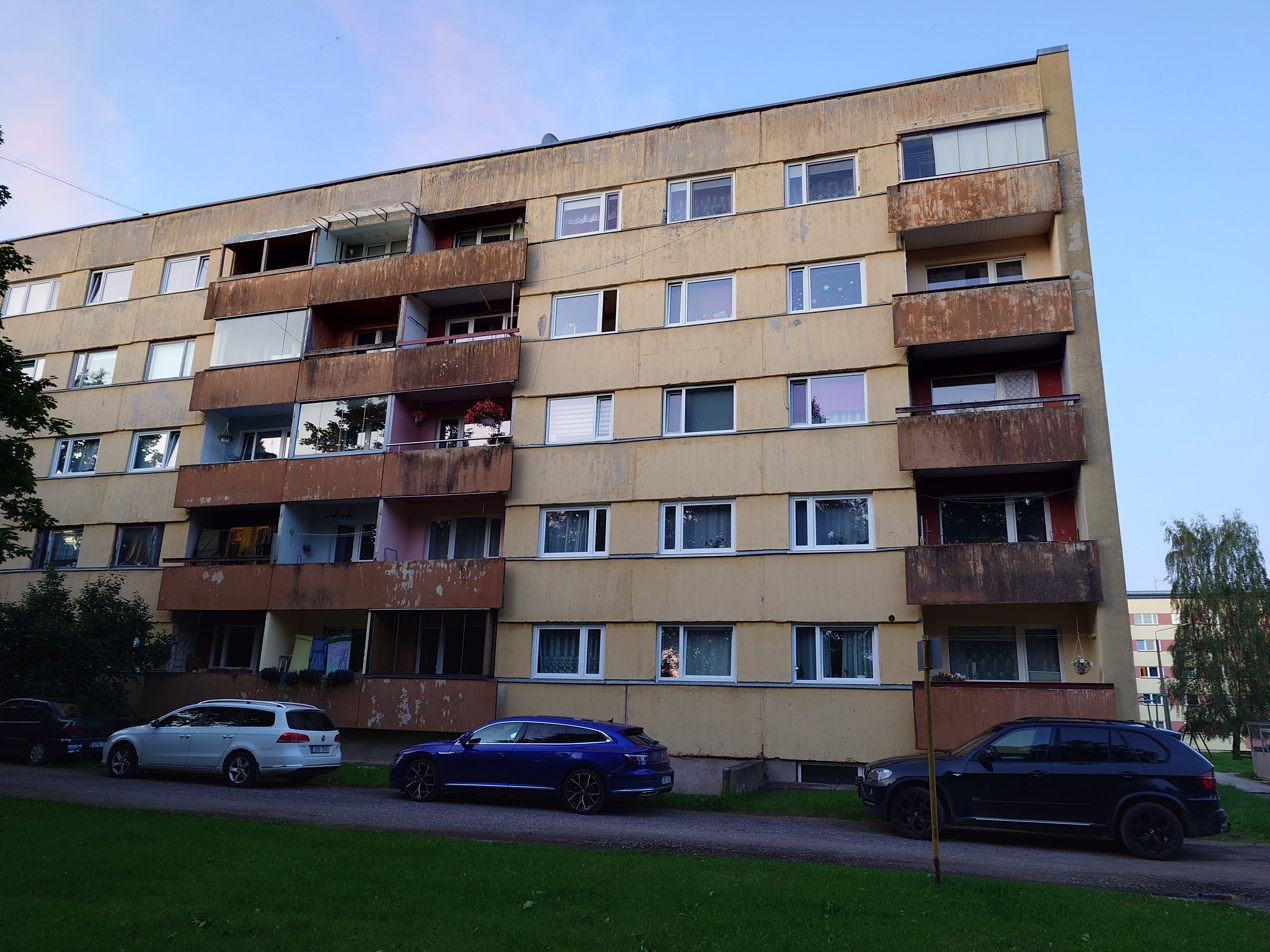
Older residential building

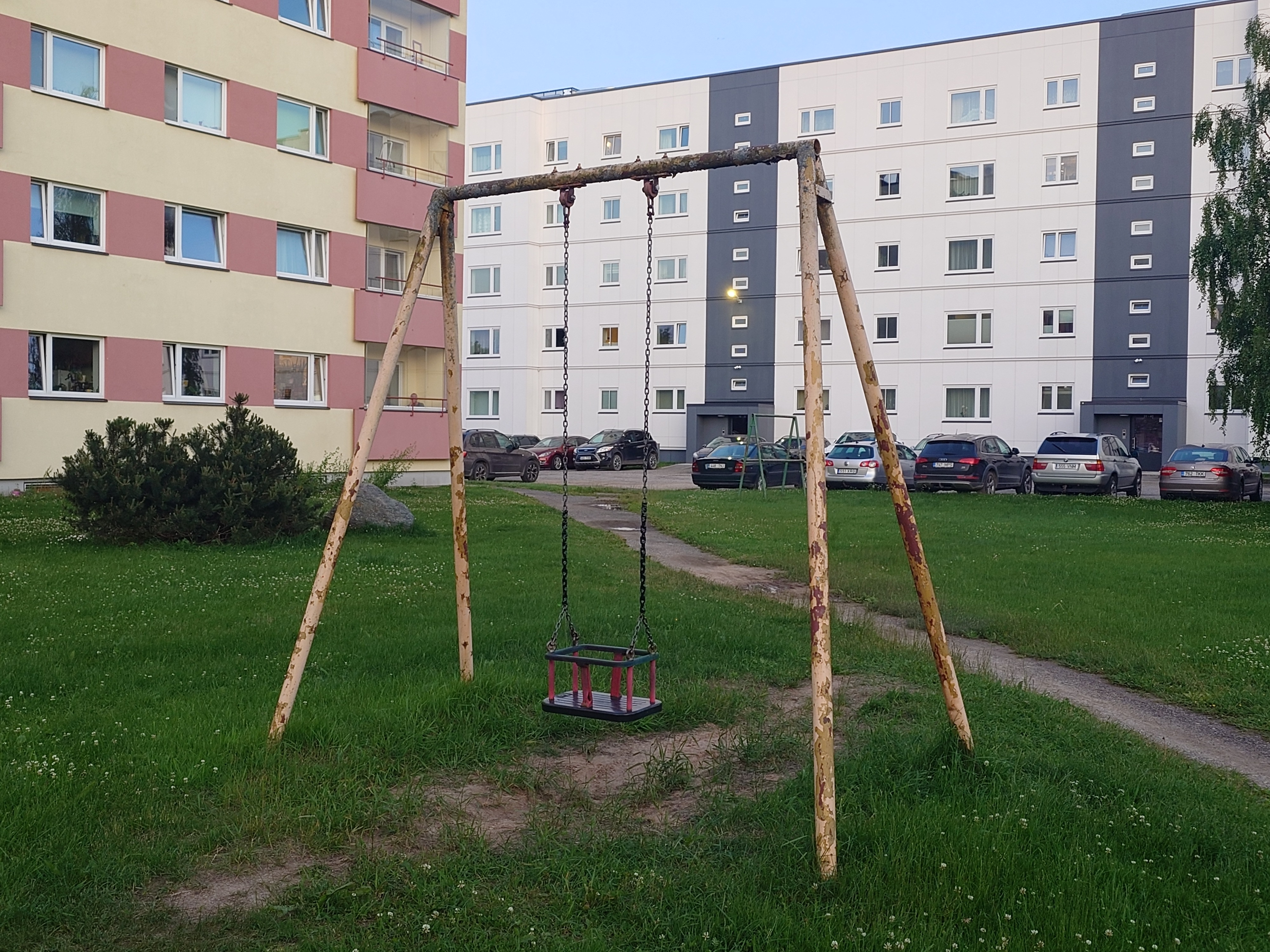
Children's swing

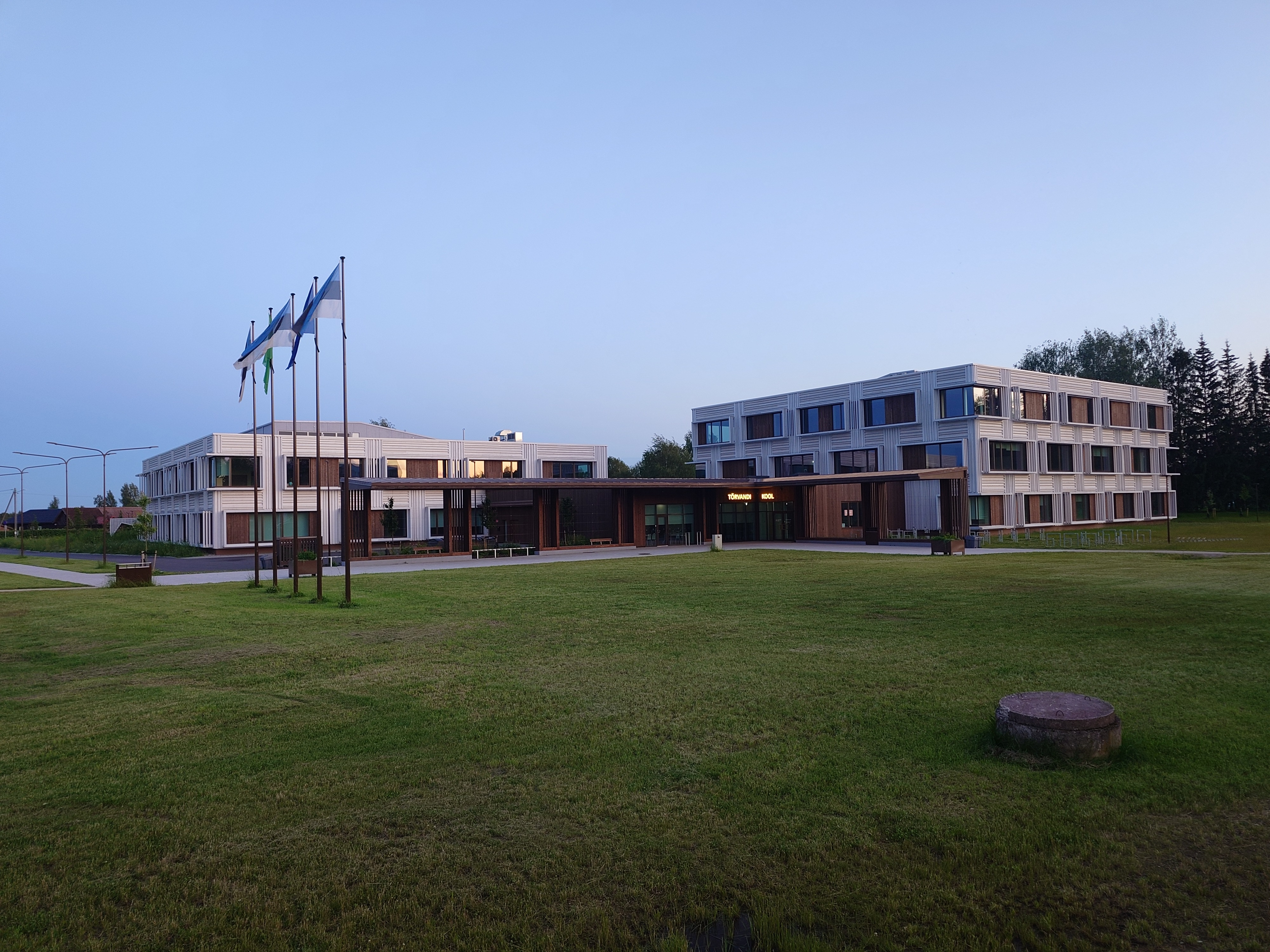
Tõrvandi school (new building from 2025)

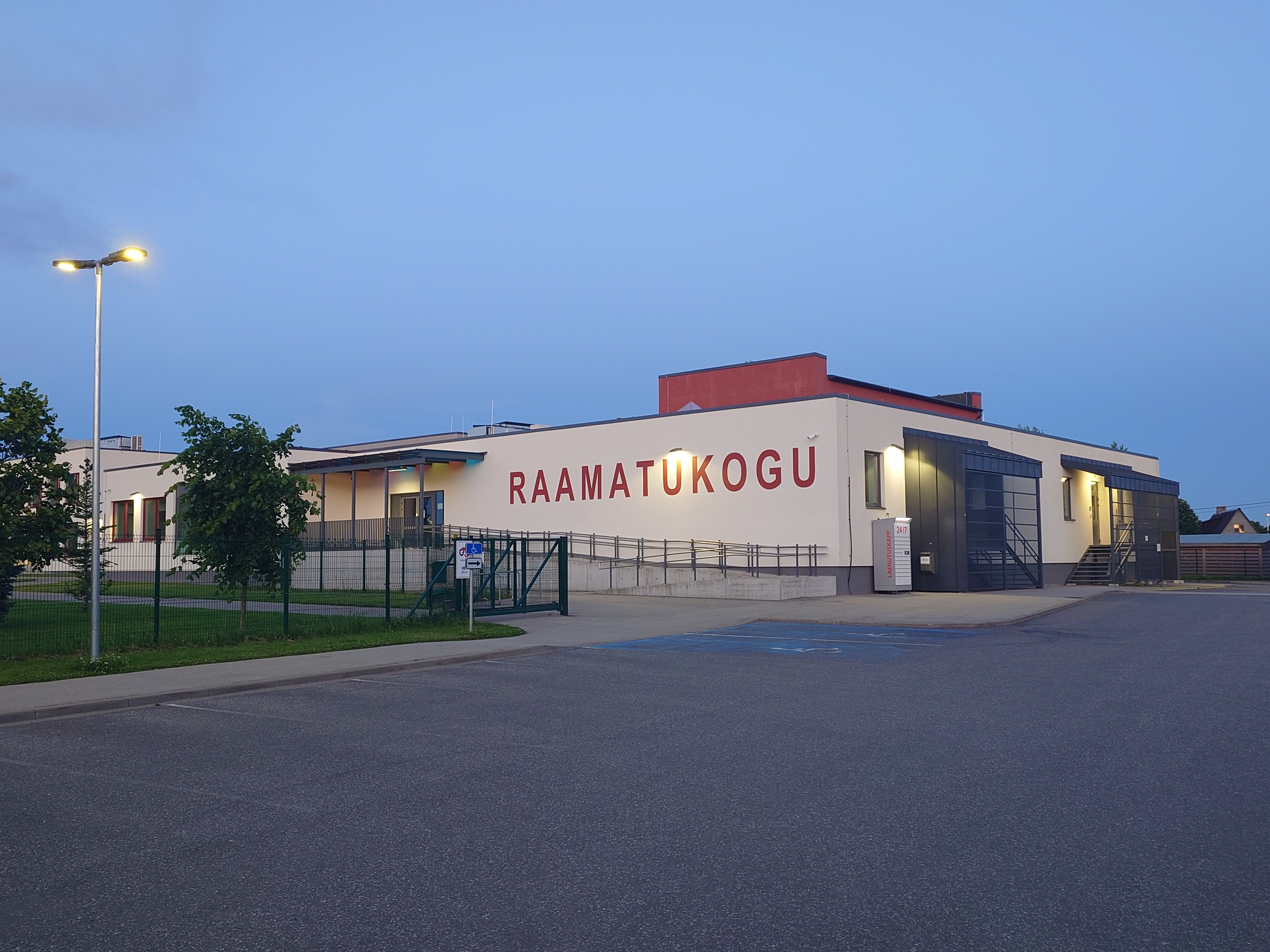
Tõrvandi library

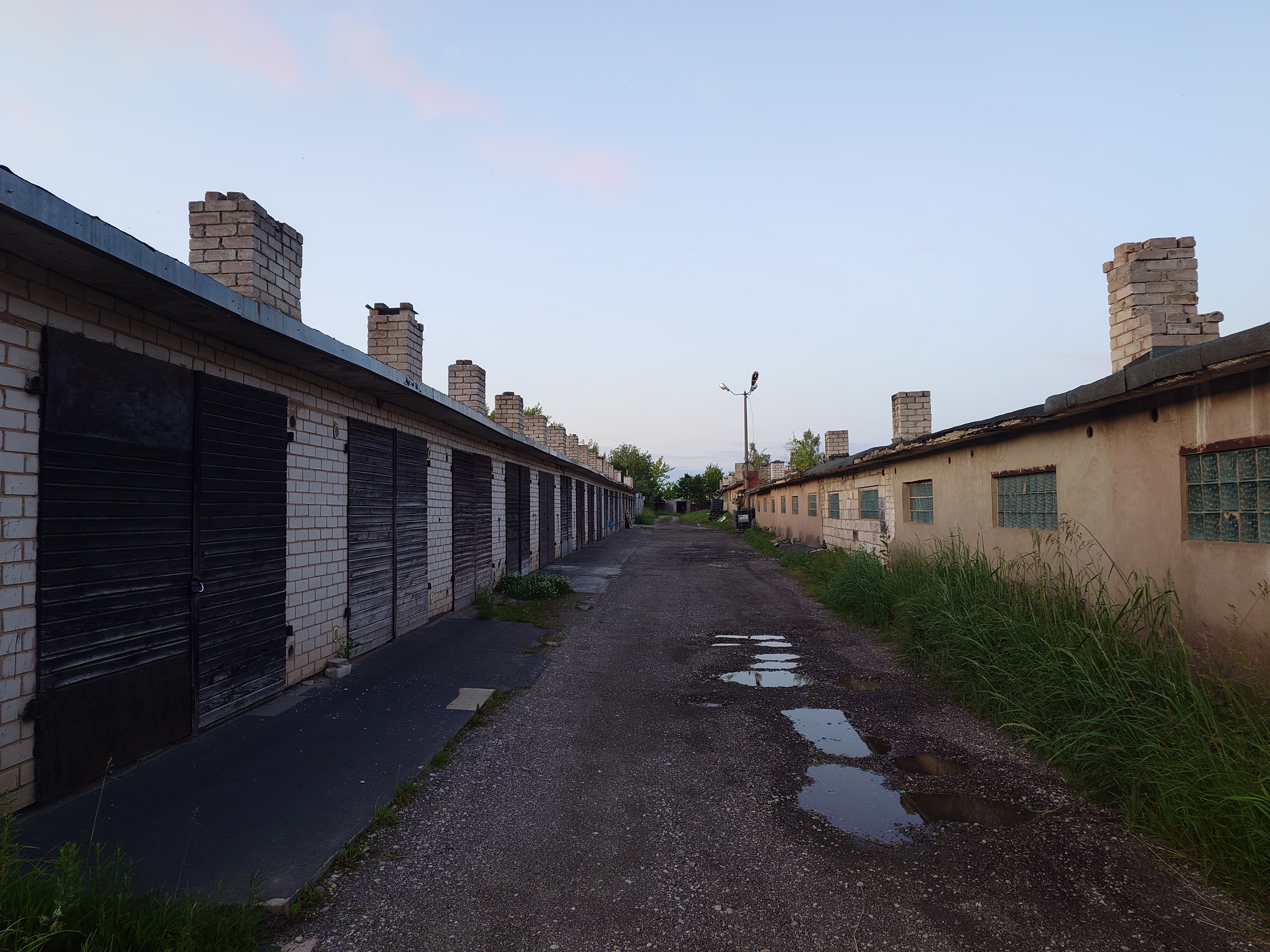
Row of garages

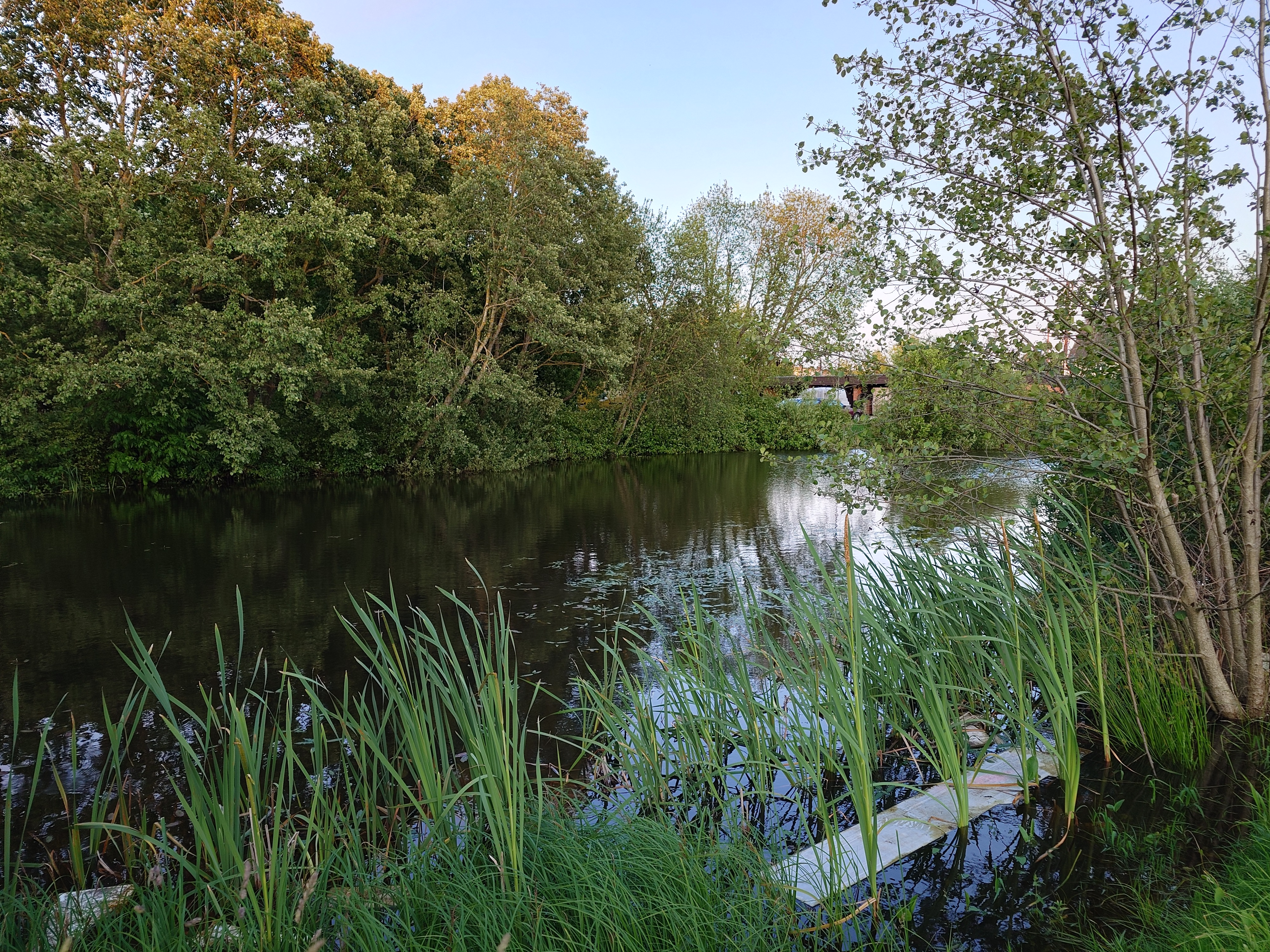
Tõrvandi pond

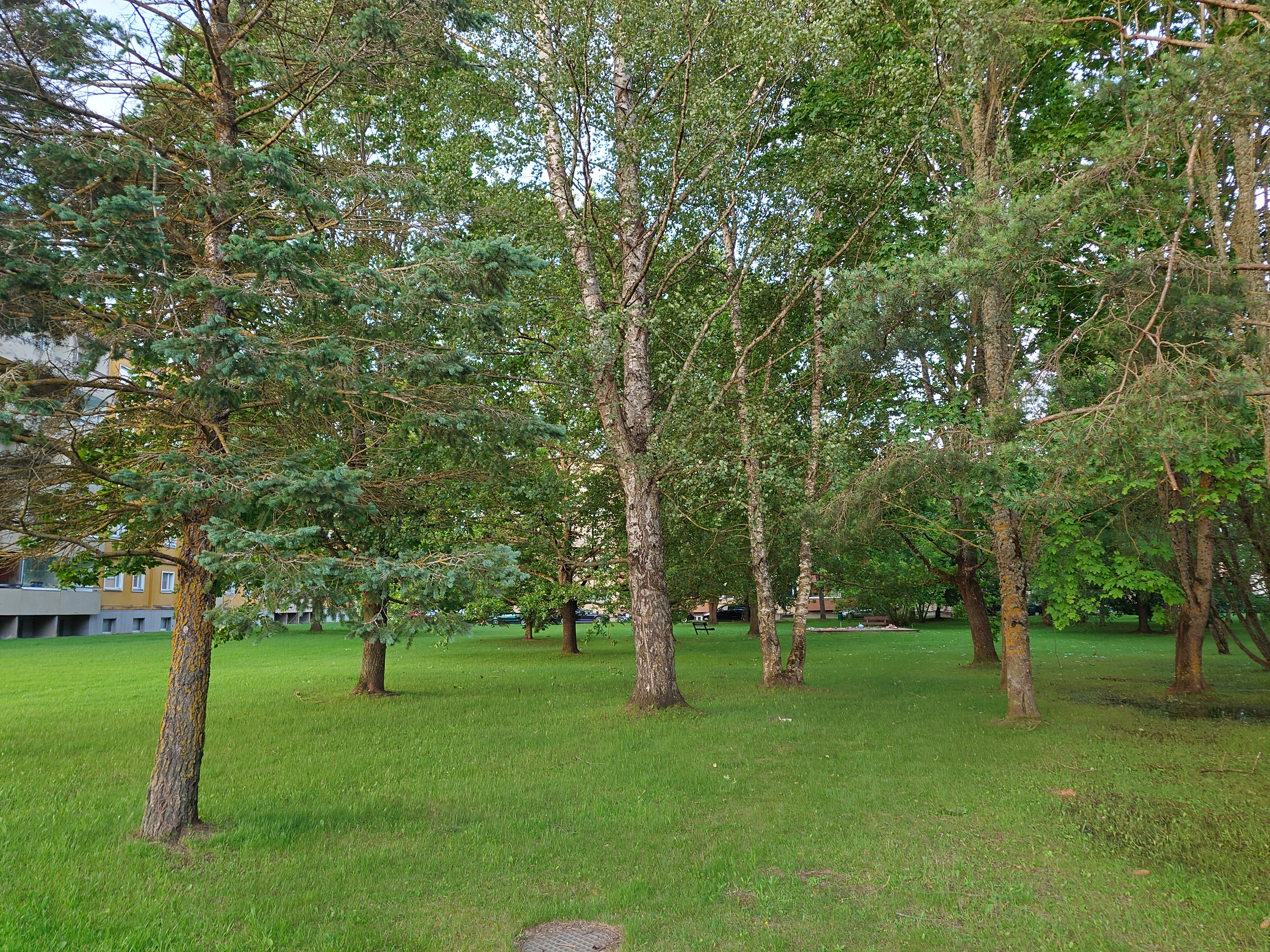
Park in Tõrvandi
