= Estonian national road 4 =

Road in Estonia

National Road 4
- Põhimaantee 4
- Pärnu Highway
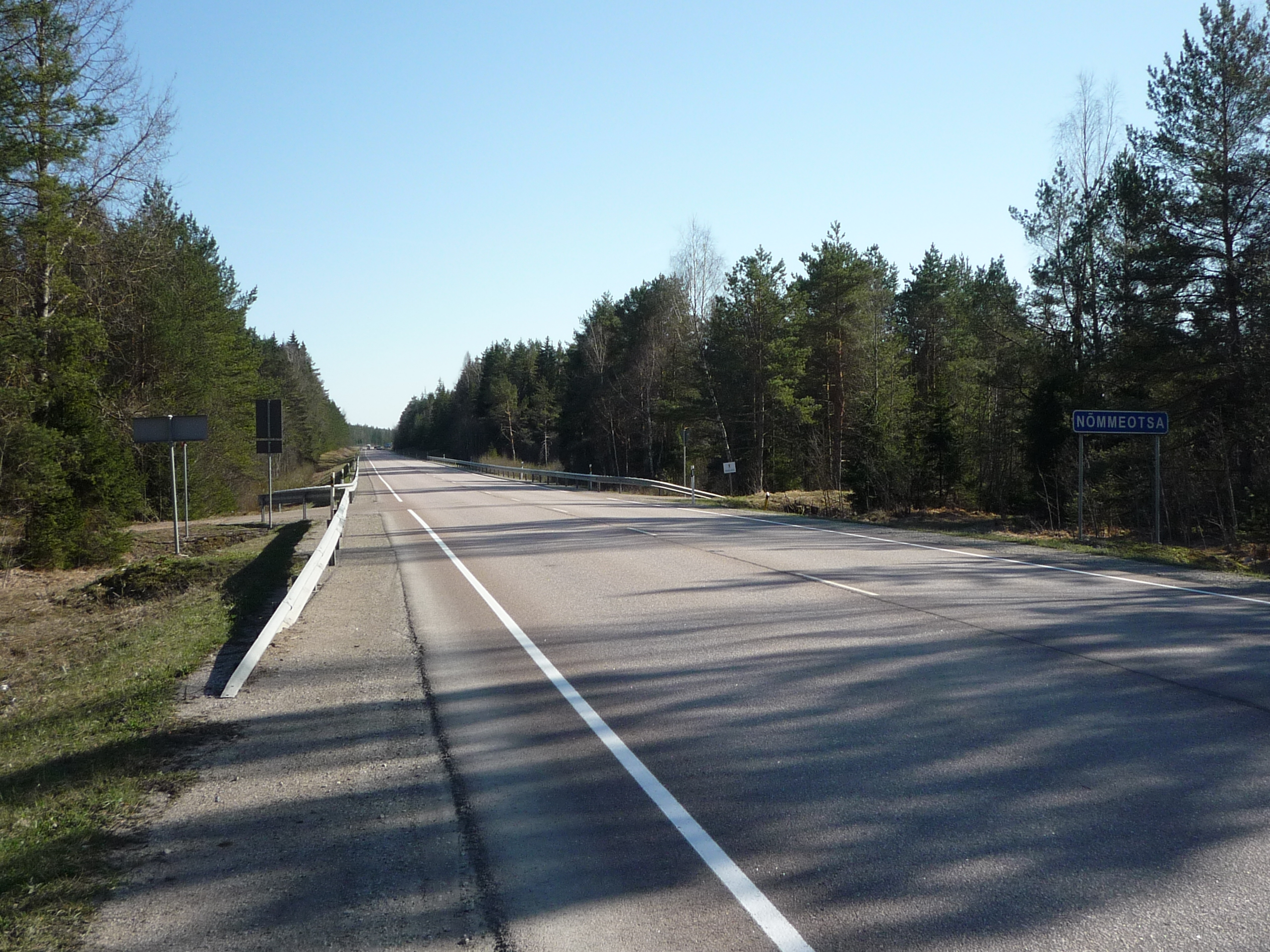

Route information
- Length: 192 km (119 mi)

Major junctions
- From: Tallinn
- Tallinn Järve, Tallinn; Kanama; Ääsmäe; Märjamaa; Märjamaa; Pärnu; Pärnu; Pärnu Uulu
- To: Ikla border with Latvia

Location
- Country: Estonia
- Counties: Harju County Rapla County Pärnu County

Highway system
- Transport in Estonia
← T3	→ T5

Tallinn-Pärnu-Ikla maantee (Tallinn-Pärnu-Ikla highway, alternatively Põhimaantee nr 4, unofficially abbreviated T4) is a 192-kilometre-long north-south national main road in Estonia. The route follows the same path as European route E67, also known as Via Baltica. The road forms an important north–south freight and travel corridor, connecting Estonia (and the rest of the Baltics) with the rest of Europe. Despite this, the only other major town serviced is Pärnu, though other main highways do branch off the T4. The highway ends on the border with Latvia in Ikla.

In 2021, the highest traffic volumes were exiting Tallinn, with AADT measured at 35,000, though this figure drops noticeably past Laagri. This is the highest recorded volume of traffic anywhere on the highway network. Being the only highway on the network that services over 1000 trucks across its entire length, congestion and dangers arising from frequent overtaking are a major issue.

The road is a dual carriageway for 13 kilometres exiting Tallinn. Isolated sections of 2+1 exist as well, however all future projects foresee a 2+2 cross-section.

== History ==
The route Tallinn-Pärnu-Ikla was part of the historical postal route between Tallinn and Riga, connecting the governatorial capitals of Estonia and Livonia. Post houses and inns were well established along the road already by the end of the 17th century. In 1800 a new route between Pärnu and Riga was established via Mõisaküla and Valmiera, replacing the previously used coastal route via Häädemeeste.

The end of the 1930s saw large-scale construction works planned on the route Laatre-Pärnu-Tallinn, to accommodate foreign visitors travelling by car to the 1940 Helsinki Olympics. The project, named "Olympic Way", foresaw the straightening of 55 kilometres of road sections and blacktop laid on 70 kilometres, replacing cobblestones. Construction began in 1939, but after the outbreak of war, materials were hard to come by and the Olympics eventually cancelled. This also cancelled the Olympic Way.

Under Soviet occupation, the highway was one of three considered to have All-Union importance (alongside Tallinn-Narva, Tallinn-Tartu). Large scale reconstruction was undertaken in 1961-1972 between Tallinn and Märjamaa. A bypass for Pärnu, including a bridge across the Pärnu river, were completed in 1970 and 1976 respectively. The first stretch of dual carriageway was opened by the 1980 Moscow Olympics, as the sailing event was held in Tallinn. A further stretch was opened during the 1980s.

The first international discussions around Via Baltica, a highway connecting Tallinn, Riga, Kaunas and Warsaw were held in 1988. Although progress has not been as successful as envisaged then, the tenets of these discussions are still held firm and eventual full development is at least ideally expected.

The first developments after re-independence saw the reconstruction and widening of Pärnu bypass in 2009–2012. In 2017 and 2020, 2+1 sections were constructed between Ääsmäe-Kohatu and bypassing Kernu.

Following the reconstruction and widening of the Pärnu bypass between 2009 and 2012, and the addition of 2+1 sections between Ääsmäe–Kohatu and the Kernu bypass in 2017 and 2020, further developments have been undertaken on Estonian national road 4. In 2023, the Pärnu–Uulu section was upgraded to a 2+2 dual carriageway, enhancing traffic flow and safety. Additionally, the Päädeva–Konuvere segment is undergoing reconstruction into a 2+2 road, with the project encompassing the refurbishment of the Konuvere Bridge to meet European road safety and design standards, as well as military mobility requirements.

However, plans for the Libatse–Nurme 2+2 expansion have encountered delays. The initial construction tender failed, leading to a revised completion target set for 2029. These developments are part of Estonia's broader efforts to enhance its main road network, particularly the Via Baltica corridor, to improve connectivity and safety.

== Route description ==
The T4 is a major north–south highway in Estonia connecting the capital of the country, Tallinn, to the fourth largest city in Estonia, Pärnu, and ultimately the Latvian border (where the Latvian A1 continues to Riga). The T4 is a part of European route E67, also known as the Via Baltica.

The route begins in Tallinn from Viru Square and runs through the city for 13 kilometres, following the city streets of Pärnu maantee and Vabaduse puiestee. Exiting the city it services the borough of Laagri. The T11 is met in Kanama at a cloverleaf interchange. Dual carriageway continues until Ääsmäe, with the outermost lane heading towards Haapsalu as the T9. A further 13 kilometres of 2+1 road follows, with a new route bypassing Kernu.

From here the route is generally straight, but does go through boroughs and villages, such as Märjamaa and Are. Another very short 2+1 sections precedes Sauga and Pärnu. The road turns left onto Pärnu bypass, which, while having 2+2 lanes, has at-grade intersections and traffic lights. The Pärnu river is crossed and the road turns left again at an intersection with Riia maantee.

The Pärnu-Uulu 2+2 section begins here on a slightly straightened route as compared to before, culminating in a trumpet interchange with the T6 in Uulu. The highway continues along the coast, meeting only the boroughs of Võiste and Häädemeeste before culminating on the Latvian border in Ikla. The former border station serves as a rest stop. The road continues as the A1 in Latvia.

=== Road length of lane ===
13 km	14 km	13 km	20 km	23 km	15 km	22 km	2 km	12 km	6 km	52 km
Urban	2+2 road	2+1 road	1+1 road	2+2 construction	1+1 road	2+2 construction	2+1 road	Urban	2+2 road	1+1 road

== Route table ==
The route passes through Harju County (Tallinn, Saue), Rapla County (Märjamaa), Pärnu County (Tori, Pärnu, Häädemeeste).

Municipality	Location	km	mi	Destinations	Notes
Tallinn	Viru väljak	0.0	0.0		Viru Square is the starting point for four highways - Tallinn-Narva, Tallinn-Tartu, Tallinn-Pärnu and Tallinn-Paldiski. Concurrency with T8.
Tallinn	Vabaduse väljak			Estonian national road 8	Urban intersection
Tallinn	Järve			– Viljandi highway, Rapla	Urban intersection
Tallinn	Liiva			– Tammemäe	Urban intersection
Saue	Veskitammi			– Laagri centre, Seljaku street, Nõlvaku street	
Saue	Tänassilma			Estonian national road 11424	
Start of dual carriageway
Saue	Topi			– Harku	
Saue	Kanama			– Keila, Saue, Paldiski, Narva, Tartu	Reconstruction planned to strengthen T11 viaduct and add collectors on T4.
Saue	Kanama			– Jälgimäe, Saue village	Northbound exit and entrance only
Saue	Rahula			– Harku	At-grade; all-directions access via U-turns
Saue	Jõgisoo			– Valingu; Vesiveski road Voore road	
Saue	Ääsmäe			– Haapsalu, Virtsu; – Ääsmäe	
End of dual carriageway
Start of 2+1
Saue	Kernu			– Kohatu, Kernu;	
Saue	Haiba			– Riisipere, Kernu, Haiba	
End of 2+1
Saue	Kustja			– Kernu, Kohila	Northbound exit only, formed by former T4 route
Märjamaa	Vaidi			– Riisipere, Pajaka	
Märjamaa	Varbola			– Rapla, Varbola centre	
Märjamaa	Varbola			– Lümandu, Sipa	
Märjamaa	Vaimõisa			– Russalu	
Märjamaa	Orgita			– Rapla	
Märjamaa	Orgita			Estonian national road 28 Estonian national road 29	To be constructed as part of Päädeva-Konuvere 2+2 section
Märjamaa	Orgita			– Märjamaa, Koluvere	
Märjamaa	Märjamaa			– Märjamaa, Valgu	
Märjamaa	Haimre			– Märjamaa	
Märjamaa	Haimre			– Moka, Haimre centre	
Märjamaa	Haimre			Estonian national road 20173	To be constructed as part of Päädeva-Konuvere 2+2 section
Märjamaa	Naistevalla			– Naistevalla	
Märjamaa	Konuvere			– Paeküla; – Sulu	
Märjamaa	Konuvere			Estonian national road 20170 Estonian national road 20174 Estonian national road 20204 Estonian national road 20142	To be constructed as part of Päädeva-Konuvere 2+2 section
Märjamaa	Konuvere			– Kilgi	
Märjamaa	Päärdu			Estonian national road 20180	
Märjamaa	Päärdu			Estonian national road 20178	
Märjamaa	Päärdu			– Manni, Valgu, Velise	
Märjamaa	Jädivere			– Vana-Vigala, Kivi-Vigala	
Märjamaa	Jädivere			Estonian national road 20177	
Põhja-Pärnumaa	Jädivere			– Langerma centre – Valgu, Kaelase	
Põhja-Pärnumaa	Jädivere			– Libatse road	
Põhja-Pärnumaa	Pärnu-Jaagupi			– Pärnu-Jaagupi centre, Koonga	
Põhja-Pärnumaa	Kergu			Estonian national road 19207 Estonian national road 19202	To be constructed as part of Libatse-Are 2+2 section
Põhja-Pärnumaa	Pärnu-Jaagupi			– Kergu, Pööravere	
Põhja-Pärnumaa	Pärnu-Jaagupi			– Pärnu-Jaagupi centre	
Põhja-Pärnumaa	Halinga			Estonian national road 19207 Estonian national road 19218	To be constructed as part of Libatse-Are 2+2 section
Põhja-Pärnumaa	Halinga			– Valistre	
Tori	Are			– Elbu	
Tori	Are			Estonian national road 19219	To be constructed as part of Are-Nurme 2+2 section
Tori	Are			– Suigu, Pärnu-Rakvere highway	
Tori	Are			– Are centre	
Tori	Nurme			– Tõstamaa, Audru	
Tori	Nurme			Estonian national road 19123	To be constructed as part of Are-Nurme 2+2 section
Start of 2+1
Tori	Nurme			– Suigu, Kilksama	Northbound exit and entrance only
End of 2+1
Tori	Sauga			– Sauga centre – Urge, Kilksama, Sauga	Roundabout
Pärnu	Ehitajate			– Lihula, Audru	
Pärnu	Papiniidu			– Rakvere; Tammiste road	
Pärnu	Raeküla			Riia maantee	
Pärnu	Raeküla			– Tori, Sindi	
Start of dual carriageway
Häädemeeste	Tõllapulga				
Häädemeeste	Mereküla			– Valga, Viljandi, Kilingi-Nõmme;	
End of dual carriageway
Häädemeeste	Uulu			– Soometsa, Uulu centre	
Häädemeeste	Metsaküla			– Tahkuranna	
Häädemeeste	Metsaküla			– Leina	
Häädemeeste	Rannametsa			– Rannametsa	
Häädemeeste	Häädemeeste			– Häädemeeste, Soometsa	
Häädemeeste	Häädemeeste			– Häädemeeste, Kilingi-Nõmme, Valga-Uulu highway	
Häädemeeste	Penu			– Urissaare, Jaagupi	
Häädemeeste	Penu			– Kabli, Massiaru	
Häädemeeste	Majaka			– Treimani	
Häädemeeste	Ikla			– Ikla	
Ikla border crossing with Latvia
1.000 mi = 1.609 km; 1.000 km = 0.621 mi: Concurrency terminus; Incomplete access; Proposed

== Old alignments and local access roads ==
Following the phased upgrade of the T4 highway into a high-speed dual-carriageway corridor along the Via Baltica, older historical single-carriageway segments were structurally disconnected from the main international transit lanes. These legacy sections were subsequently downgraded in the national registry and reclassified as village roads, municipal streets, or parallel access routes running adjacent to the new expressway network.

=== Kernu section ===
The historical alignment passing through the residential core of Kernu was preserved as a localized road link. It was formally integrated into the national secondary road register as the Kustja–Kernu route (designation 11430). Now operating as a low-speed village and tertiary road, it provides direct entry to residential properties and the historical Kernu manor complex without intersecting high-speed international transit.

=== Are section ===
The former T4 route that divided the settlement of Are was converted into a local village and residential access road. This segment now functions primarily as a domestic and agricultural distributor link, operating under a reduced speed limit to maximize safety for local residents while running parallel to the modern western bypass.

=== Sauga section ===
The original northern entry lane into Pärnu via Sauga was completely bypassed by the modern 2x2 highway alignment. The historical pathway was officially downgraded to a suburban residential street and renamed Tallinn Highway (Tallinna maantee), completely removing heavy goods vehicles (HGVs) from the residential environment.

=== Pärnu urban transit route ===
The legacy urban path that historically routed heavy Via Baltica traffic directly through the center of Pärnu was entirely decoupled from the national transit matrix. These historic streets were handed over to the local municipality and re-designated as standard urban arterial and city roads. The old route follows the alignment of Riga Highway (Riia maantee), Pikk, Vee, and crosses the river via the historic Tallinn Highway Bridge (Tallinna maantee sild).

=== Uulu section ===
Near the southern boundary of the expansion zone approaching Uulu, the original single-carriageway alignment was permanently cut off from the main transit flow. The initial stretch of this bypassed route has been reclassified as a minor road named the Reiu link road. The terminal segment has been modified into a dead end, functioning as a service road that leads directly into the Reiu beach parking area (Reiu ranna parkla). It now serves exclusively as a localized cul-de-sac and recreational access road for visitors, completely separated from the high-speed 2x2 arterial lanes.

== See also ==
- Transport in Estonia
