= Transport in Estonia =

Transport in Estonia relies mainly on road and rail networks.

== Roads ==
Estonian main and E-roads

- Total: 57,565 km (including 16,465 km of national roads)
- Paved: 12,926 km (including 99 km of limited-access roads)

=== National roads ===
National roads form the core of Estonian road network. Their total length is 16,489 km (or 28% of all roads), 67% of them are paved. They are divided into 4 classes according to importance:

- main roads (1,607 km)
- basic roads (2,406 km)
- secondary roads (12,476 km)
- local roads (18,455 km)

Main roads in Estonia
Number	E-road	Route	Length (km)	Notes
T1	E20	Tallinn – Narva	211	expressway for 80 km out of Tallinn and 7 km between Kukruse and Johvi. Continues to Saint Petersburg as Russian A180
T2	E263	Tallinn – Tartu – Võru – Luhamaa	291	expressway for 79 km out of Tallinn. Crosses Estonia in southeast direction from Tallinn to join national road 7
T3	E264	Jõhvi – Tartu – Valga	216	continues from Valga to Riga as Latvian A3
T4	E67	Tallinn – Pärnu – Ikla	193	expressway for 14 km out of Tallinn and 7 km out of Pärnu continues from Ikla to Riga as Latvian A1
T5		Pärnu – Rakvere – Sõmeru	184	from Pärnu via Paide to join national road 1 near Rakvere
T6		Valga – Uulu	125	from Pärnu via Kilingi-Nõmme to Valga
T7	E77	Riga – Pskov	22	short section in southeast Estonia via Misso, continues as Russian A212 and Latvian A2
T8	E265	Tallinn – Paldiski	49	via Keila, Keila-Paldiski section is part of E 265, which continues on ferry to Kapellskär
T9		Ääsmäe – Haapsalu – Rohuküla	81	ferry connection from Rohuküla to Hiiumaa
T10		Risti – Virtsu – Kuivastu – Kuressaare	144	ferry between Virtsu and Kuivastu (Muhumaa)
T11	E265	Tallinn ring road	38	
T92		Tartu – Viljandi – Kilingi-Nõmme	130	

=== Electric vehicle network ===
Estonia is the first country in the EU and in the world to introduce a nationwide, publicly serviced charging system for charging the batteries of electric vehicles. The 165 fast charging stations are equipped with connectors of the CHAdeMO standard. They are located throughout the entire country, including the islands, and have a maximum distance of 40–60 km in between. The charging stations can also be navigated via a smartphone app (currently only for Android). The relatively dense network and 30 minute quick charges are built to enable a country-wide electric vehicle network. The system offers a unitary booking service and several different tariffs, some of which appear attractively low priced. The charging station network puts Estonia at the forefront in Europe even though Norway actually has a higher penetration of electric vehicles. Estonia has a rate of 1 electric vehicle per 1,000 capita, whereas Norway has 4 EVs per 1,000 capita.

== Railways ==
- Total: 900 km common carrier lines only (1,200 km including dedicated industrial lines)
- Broad gauge: 900 km 1,520 mm (4 ft 11 27/32 in) or 1,524 mm (5 ft) gauge (133 km electrified)

=== Railway links with adjacent countries ===
- Latvia – yes – same 1,520 mm (4 ft 11 27/32 in) gauge
- Russia – yes – same 1,520 mm (4 ft 11 27/32 in) gauge

As of 2023, the Rail Baltica project to link a high speed line through Latvia and Lithuania to Poland, is scheduled for completion in 2030, with a start of services on some of the sections in 2028.

=== Light rail ===
There has been a growing tram network in Tallinn, Estonia since 1888, when traffic was started by horse-powered trams. The first line was electrified on October 28, 1925. The first electric trams were built by Dvigatel, Ltd., in Tallinn before World War II and for some years after that, the last one in 1954. In the 1920s and 1930s gas-powered trams were also used. Since 1955 to 1988 German-built trams were used. In total, there were 20 LOWA T54-B54 trams (in use from February 1955 to March 1977), 11 Gotha T57-B57 (in use from January 1958 to June 1978), 5 Gotha T59E-B59E (in use from June 1960 to February 1980), 14 Gotha T2-62 and B2-62 (in use from 1962 to 1981) and 50 Gotha G4 trams (in use from January 1965 to October 1988) trams. The first Czechoslovak-built ČKD Tatra T4SU arrived in 1973. The T4SU trams were in use from May 1973 to September 2005 and there were 60 of them. The first KT4SU arrived in Tallinn in 1981 and was first in use on March 10, 1981. In 2007, there are 56 KT4SU, 12 KTNF6 (rebuilt KT4SUs, 10 local, one from Gera and one from Erfurt) and 23 KT4D (12 from Gera, 6 from Cottbus, 1 from Frankfurt (Oder) and 5 from Erfurt) in use. As of 2018, there are five lines: 1: (Kopli-Kadriorg), 2: (Kopli-Suur-Paala), 3: (Tondi-Kadriorg) 4: (Tondi-Suur-Paala) and 5: (Kopli-Vana-Lõuna).

The line number 4 was diverted to Suur-Paala in 2024 due to the construction of the Rail Baltica railway terminal in Ülemiste. However, said construction has finished and service to the airport resumed in the 1st of August 2026.

== Ports and harbours ==
Estonia has 45 ports in the State Port Register. With a few exceptions, all of them are on the Baltic Sea.

Largest ports are Muuga (near Tallinn), Tallinn (comprises several ports), Paldiski, Kunda, Pärnu and Sillamäe.

== Merchant marine ==
Since 2014, there have been no vessels over 500gt on the Estonian register. About 60 merchant vessels are beneficially owned in Estonia, with most of them registered in Malta. The government has started a drive to bring more of these vessels back into the Estonian register.

== Airports ==
=== Airports – with paved runways ===
- total: 13 (2013)
- over 3,047 m: 2
- 2,438 to 3,047 m: 8
- 1,524 m to 2,437 m : 2
- 914 to 1,523 m: 1

Lennart Meri Tallinn Airport is the largest airport in Estonia.

== Pipelines ==
- Natural gas 859 km (2007)

== Waterways ==
- 320 km perennially navigable

Currently operating water transport routes:

- International:
  - Tallinn – Helsinki ferry and (seasonal) high-speed craft
  - Tallinn – Mariehamn (Åland) – Stockholm ferry
  - Paldiski – Kappelskär (Sweden) ferry
  - Tallinn – Visby (Gotland) (seasonal cruise) ferry
- Domestic:
  - Western Estonia:
    - Rohuküla – Sviby (Vormsi Island) ferry
    - Rohuküla – Heltermaa (Hiiumaa Island) ferry
    - Sõru (Hiiumaa Island) – Triigi (Saaremaa Island) ferry
    - Virtsu – Kuivastu (Muhu Island) ferry
    - Pärnu – Kihnu Island boat-ferry
    - Munalaid – Kihnu Island boat-ferry
    - Munalaid – Manilaid Islet boat-ferry and boat
    - Roomassaare (Saaremaa Island) – Abruka Island boat-ferry and boat
    - Munalaid – Ruhnu Island (charter) ferry and (seasonal) high-speed craft-ferry
    - Pärnu – Ruhnu Island (seasonal) high-speed craft-ferry
    - Roomassaare (Saaremaa Island) – Ruhnu Island (seasonal) high-speed craft-ferry
    - Rohuküla – Hobulaid Islet (charter) boat
  - Northern Estonia:
    - Leppneeme – Prangli Island boat-ferry
    - Tallinn – Aegna Island (seasonal) boat
    - Tallinn – Naissaar Island (seasonal) boat
    - Dirhami – Osmussaar Island (seasonal) boat
    - Kurkse – Väike-Pakri Island (charter) boat
  - Lake Peipus and Emajõgi River:
    - Laaksaare – Piirissaar Island ferry
    - Kavastu (seasonal) cable ferry across Emajõgi River

== See also ==
- M/S Estonia
- TS Laevad – ferry company serving the major islands
- Kihnu Veeteed – ferry company serving mainly smaller islands
- Plug-in electric vehicles in Estonia
