= Estonian national road 6 =

Road in Estonia

National Road 6
- Põhimaantee 6
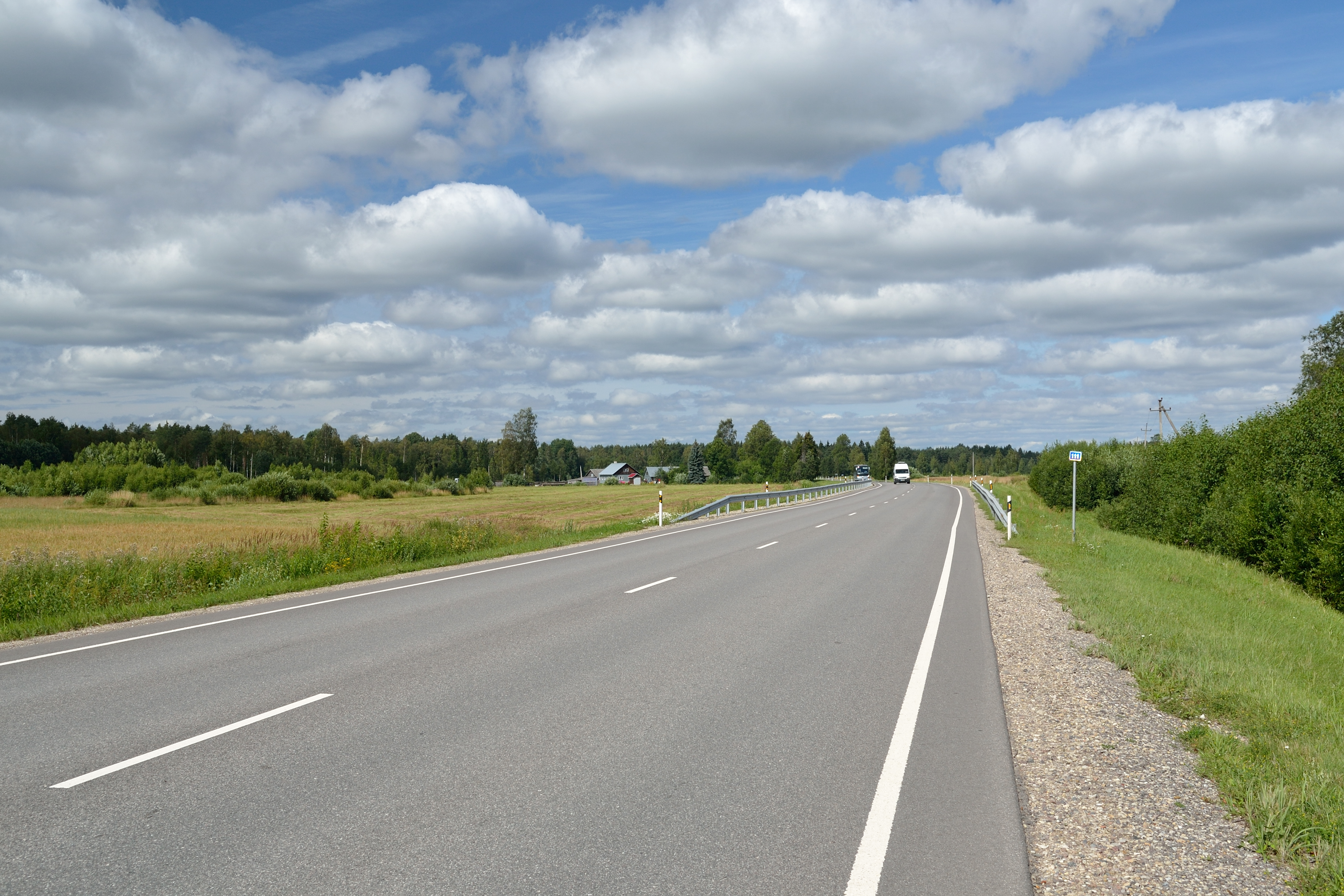

Route information
- Length: 125 km (78 mi)

Major junctions
- From: Valga
- Valga Valga; Tõrva; Tõrva; Karksi-Nuia; Karksi-Nuia; Mõisaküla Kilingi-Nõmme
- To: Uulu

Location
- Country: Estonia
- Counties: Valga County Viljandi County Pärnu County

Highway system
- Transport in Estonia
← T5	→ T7

National Road 6 (also known as Valga-Uulu maantee; Valga-Uulu highway) begins from Valga at the border crossing with Latvia. After this the road runs through the city for 0.5 km, after which it crosses the city limits. The Valga-Uulu highway runs parallel to the southern border of Estonia. The highway ends on the T4 at Uulu.

== Route ==
The total length of the road is 124.8 km and it's the only 1+1 road in Estonia that allows 100 km/h.

== See also ==
- Transport in Estonia
