= Marta Lepp =

Estonian writer

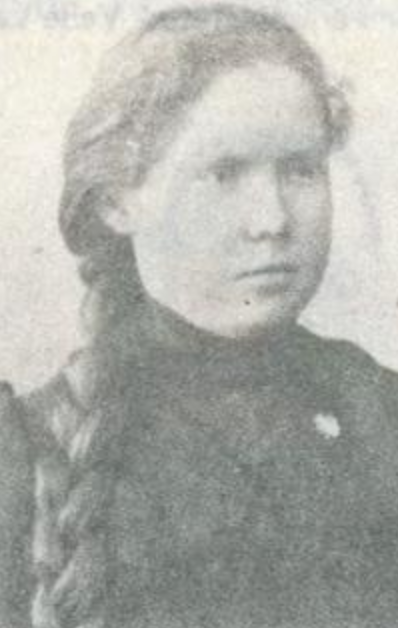
- Marta Lepp, photographed as a young woman, from a 1936 book
- Born: Marta Kirschbaum; 12 November 1883; Varbola, Governorate of Estonia, Russian Empire
- Died: 11 November 1940 (aged 56); Tartu, Estonia
- Other names: Sophia Vardi (pseudonym), Marta Kirschbaum (after 1913), Marta Utuste or Maarda Utuste (after 1927)
- Occupations: Writer, editor, educator, political leader

Marta Sophia Lepp Utuste (born Marta Kirschbaum; 12 November 1883 – 11 November 1940), also known as Sophia Vardi and Maarda Lepp-Utuste, was an Estonian writer, editor, educator, and political and religious leader.

== Early life ==
Lepp was born in Varbola, the daughter of Priidik Lepp and Maria Sassi Lepp. She attended schools in Tallinn and trained as a teacher in Saint Petersburg.

== Career ==
For her revolutionary activities, Lepp was imprisoned in Siberia in 1905, 1907, and 1910; she escaped at least once before her official release in 1910. In 1917, she returned to Estonia, where she taught Estonian language and history in Tallinn; she was also head of a women's political organization, and was editor of a newspaper, Our Free Land. She and her husband were adherents and leaders of Taaraism, an Estonian neo-pagan religion. Her writing included short stories, an opera libretto, a novel, and a three-volume memoir.

== Personal life ==
Lepp married soldier Gustav Vladimir Kirschbaum (later known as Kustas Utuste) in 1913. Their son Reljo Utuste was born in Tallinn in 1923. Their nephew was writer Henn-Kaarel Hellat. She died in 1940, the day before her 57th birthday, in Tartu. There is a collection of her papers at the University of Minnesota.
