= Estonian national road 5 =

Road in Estonia

National Road 5
- Põhimaantee 5
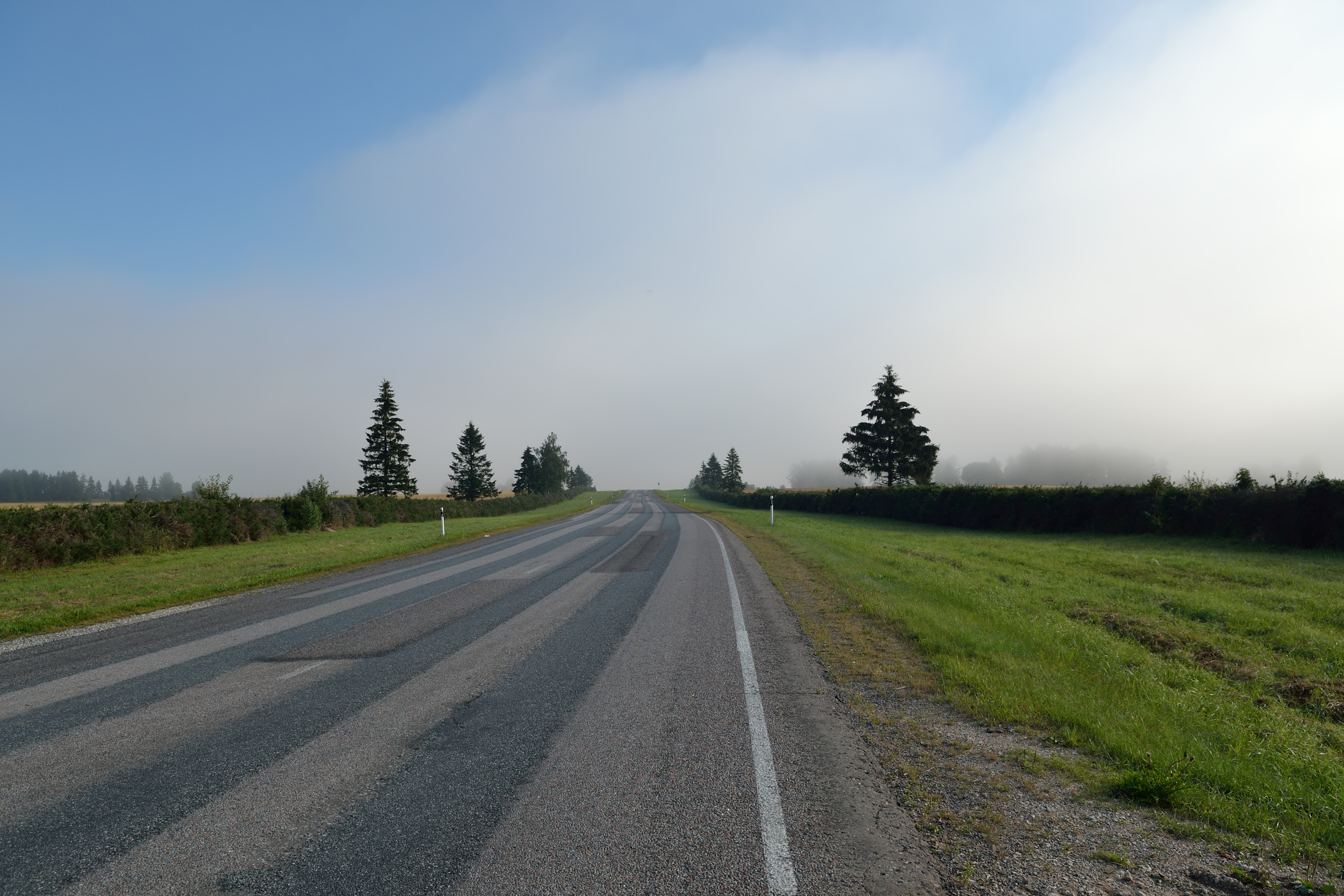

Route information
- Length: 185 km (115 mi)

Major junctions
- From: Pärnu
- Tori Aluste; Vändra; Türi; Türi; Mäo; Aravete; Käravete; Tapa; Rakvere; Rakvere; Rakvere Rakvere
- To: Sõmeru

Location
- Country: Estonia
- Counties: Pärnu County Järva County Lääne-Viru County

Highway system
- Transport in Estonia
← T4	→ T6

Põhimaantee 5 (abbreviated T5) is a 184-kilometre long west–east national main road in Estonia. The highway starts outside Pärnu. After this the main cities passed are Vändra, Türi, Paide and Rakvere. The highway ends in Sõmeru when intersecting with the T1.

The road forms a minor southwest–northeast transport artery in Estonia. In 2015, the highest traffic density on the route was between Sõmeru and Rakvere, with an AADT of 6,000. The figures nearly beat the section between Paide and Mäo, with an AADT of 5,900.

The road is a dual carriageway for 1.5 kilometres. The short section can be found at Mäo, on the interchange with the T2. Currently there are no plans to further widen the road.

== Route description ==
The T5 is a minor west–east transport route in Estonia connecting the E67 to the E20 diagonally across Estonia. The route bypasses most towns, only going through Türi. The highway begins outside Pärnu on an intersection with the T4. The road runs parallel with the Pärnu river until Urge, and for the entirety of its route, runs northeast diagonally across Estonia. The road bypasses the borough of Vändra. At Rae, the road crosses the Pärnu river and runs parallel with it once again, with an average kilometre gap. At Särevere, the Pärnu river is again crossed and Türi town limits are crossed. The road forms the central magistrale of Türi, also intersecting with the T15. Outside Paide, the road is directed onto a bypass. After Paide, the Pärnu river is once again crossed. At Mäo, the road turns into a dual carriageway (I class highway) for 1.5 kilometres, interchanging with the T2.

At Roosna-Alliku, the route stops running parallel to the Pärnu river (as the source of the river is at Roosna-Alliku). At Aravete, the road intersects with the T39. At Käravete, the roads intersects with the T13. The road slightly bypasses Tapa. At Rakvere, the route follows the Rakvere ring road, intersecting with numerous support routes. The road terminates when intersecting with the T1 at Sõmeru.'

Currently there are no speed cameras on the T5.

== See also ==
- Highways in Estonia
