= Massiaru =

Village in Estonia

Coordinates: 58°00′N 24°35′E

- Village
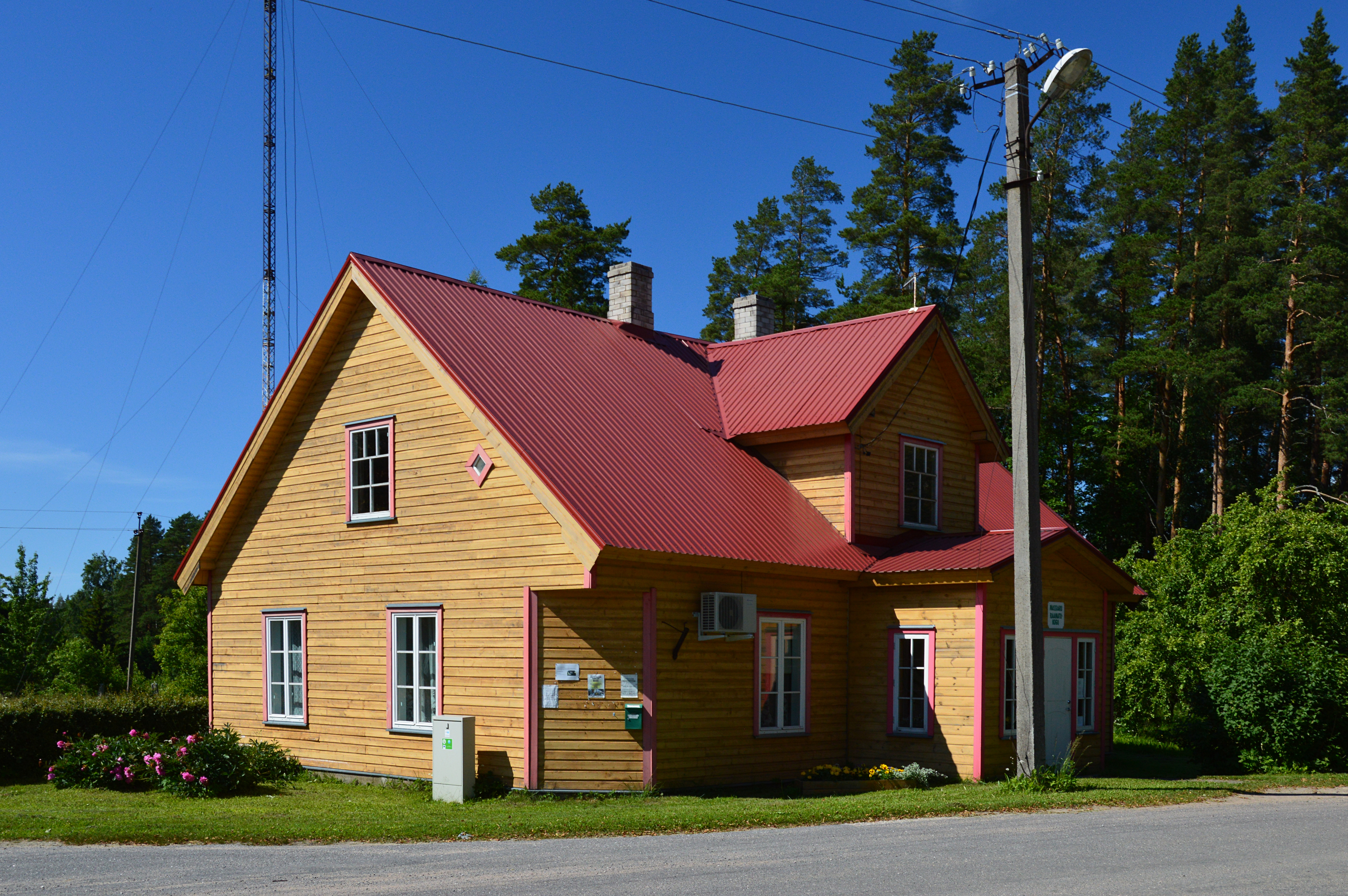
- Massiaru library
- Interactive map of Massiaru
- Country: Estonia
- County: Pärnu County
- Parish: Häädemeeste Parish
- Time zone: UTC+2 (EET)
  - Summer (DST): UTC+3 (EEST)

Massiaru is a village in Häädemeeste Parish, Pärnu County in southwestern Estonia.
