= Häädemeeste =

Borough in Estonia

- Small borough
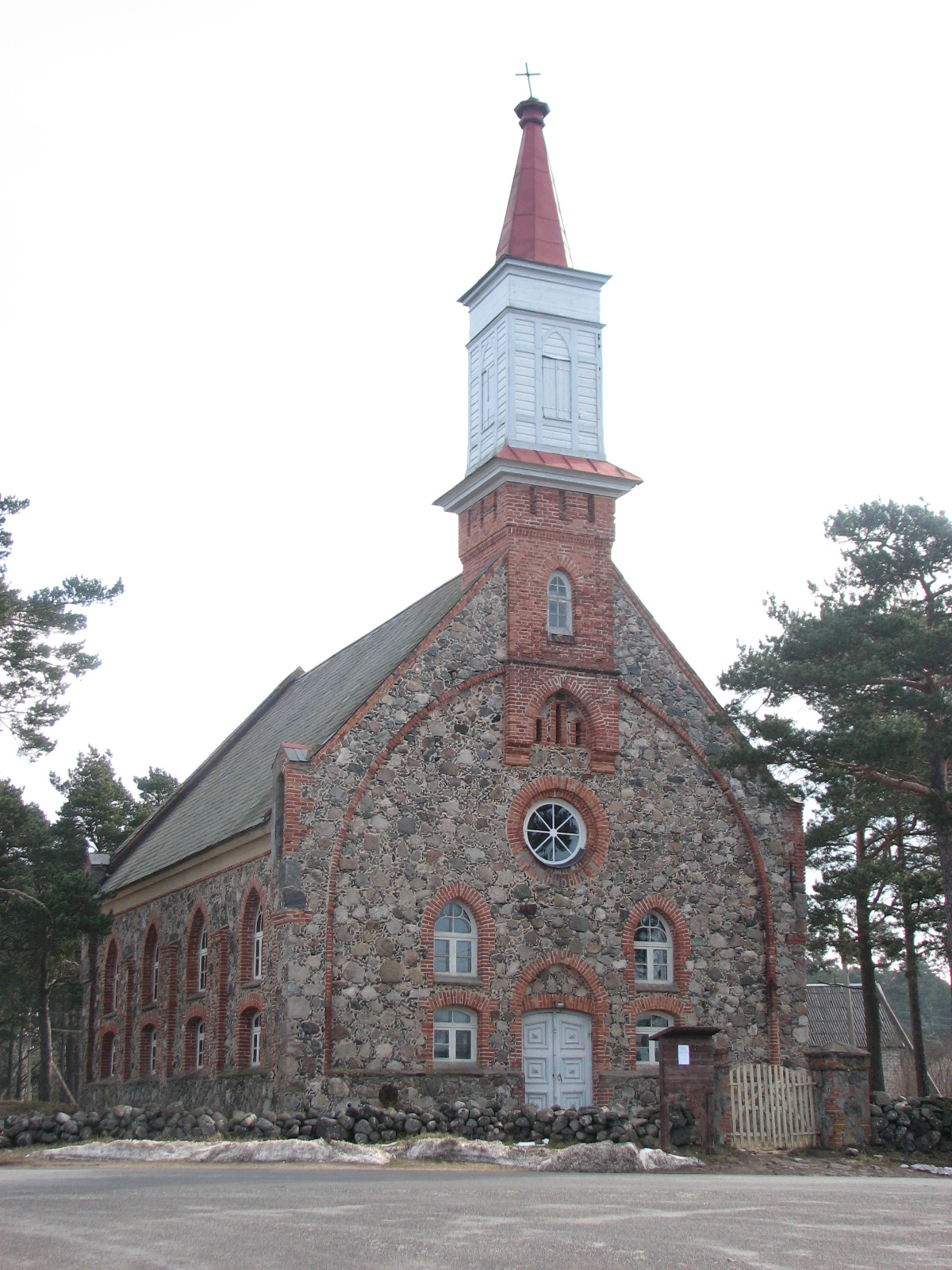
- Häädemeeste St. Michael's Church

- Location in Estonia
- Coordinates: 58°5′0″N 24°29′55″E
- Country: Estonia
- County: Pärnu County
- Municipality: Häädemeeste Parish

Population (01.01.2010)
  - Total: 790

Häädemeeste (Estonian for "Good Men", German: Gudmannsbach) is a small borough (Estonian: alevik) in Pärnu County, southwestern Estonia. It is the administrative centre of Häädemeeste Parish. Häädemeeste has a population of 790 (as of 1 January 2010).

Mineral water is produced in Häädemeeste.

== Gallery ==
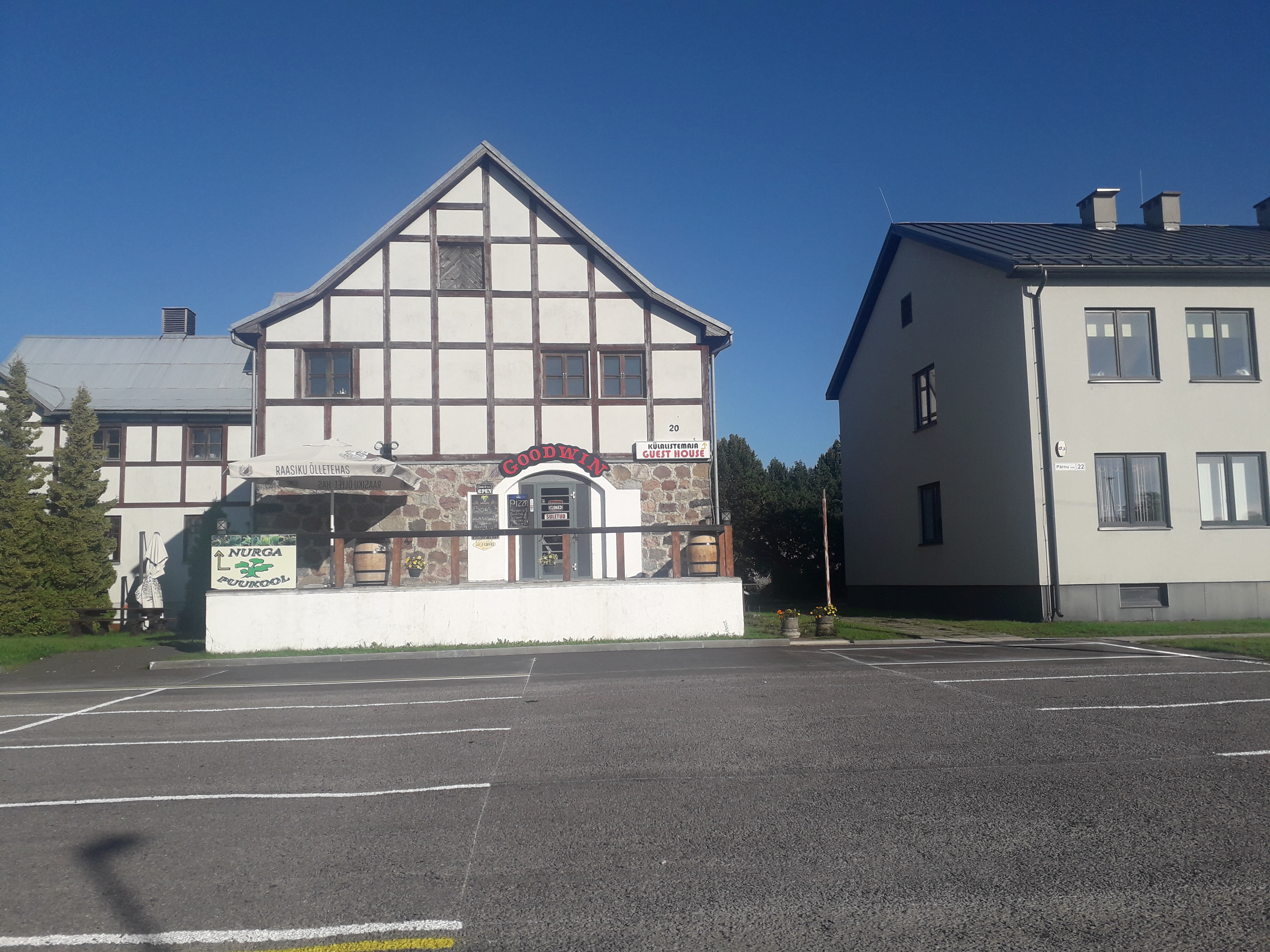
The central part of Häädemeeste

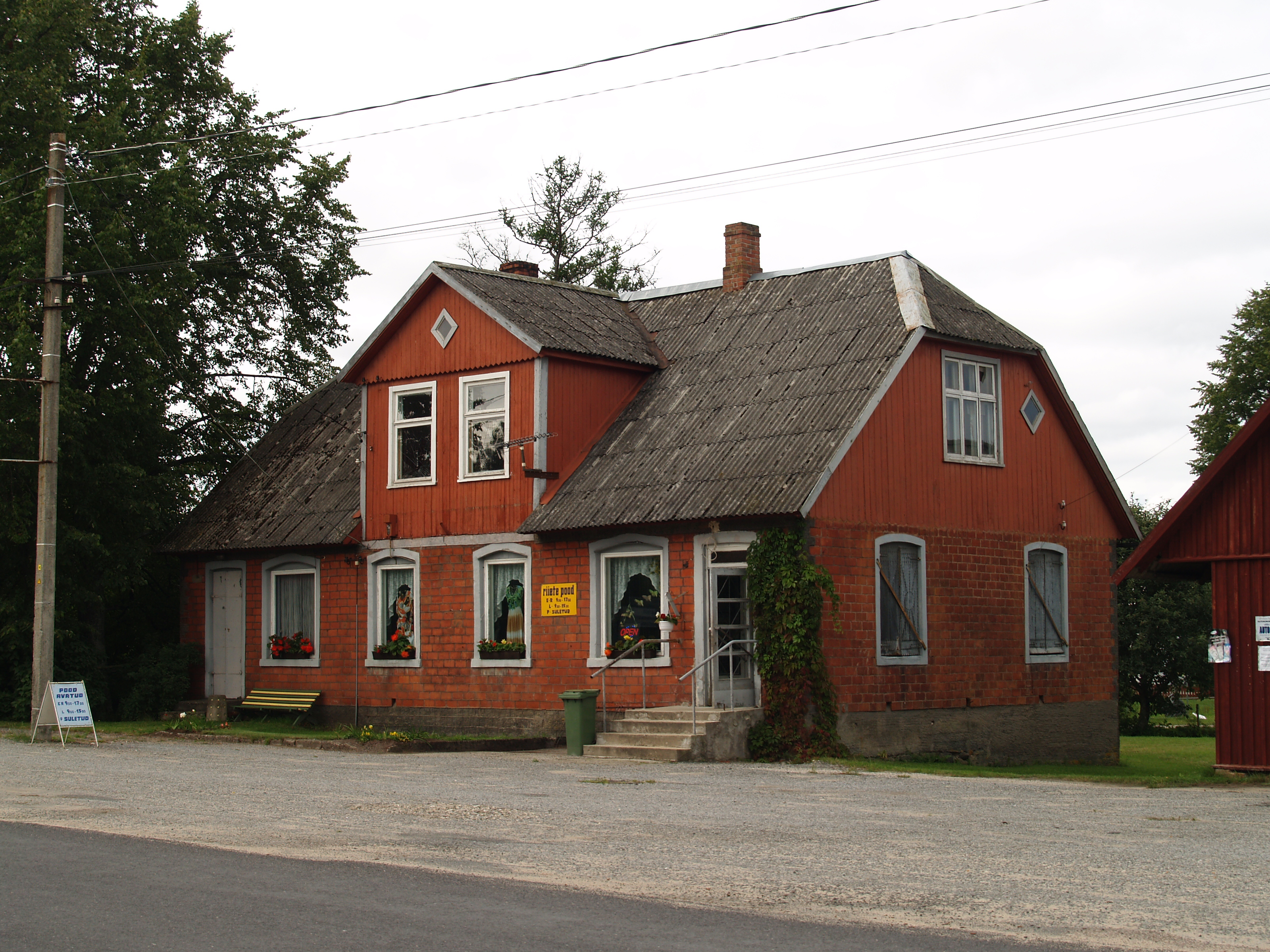
Shop in Häädemeeste

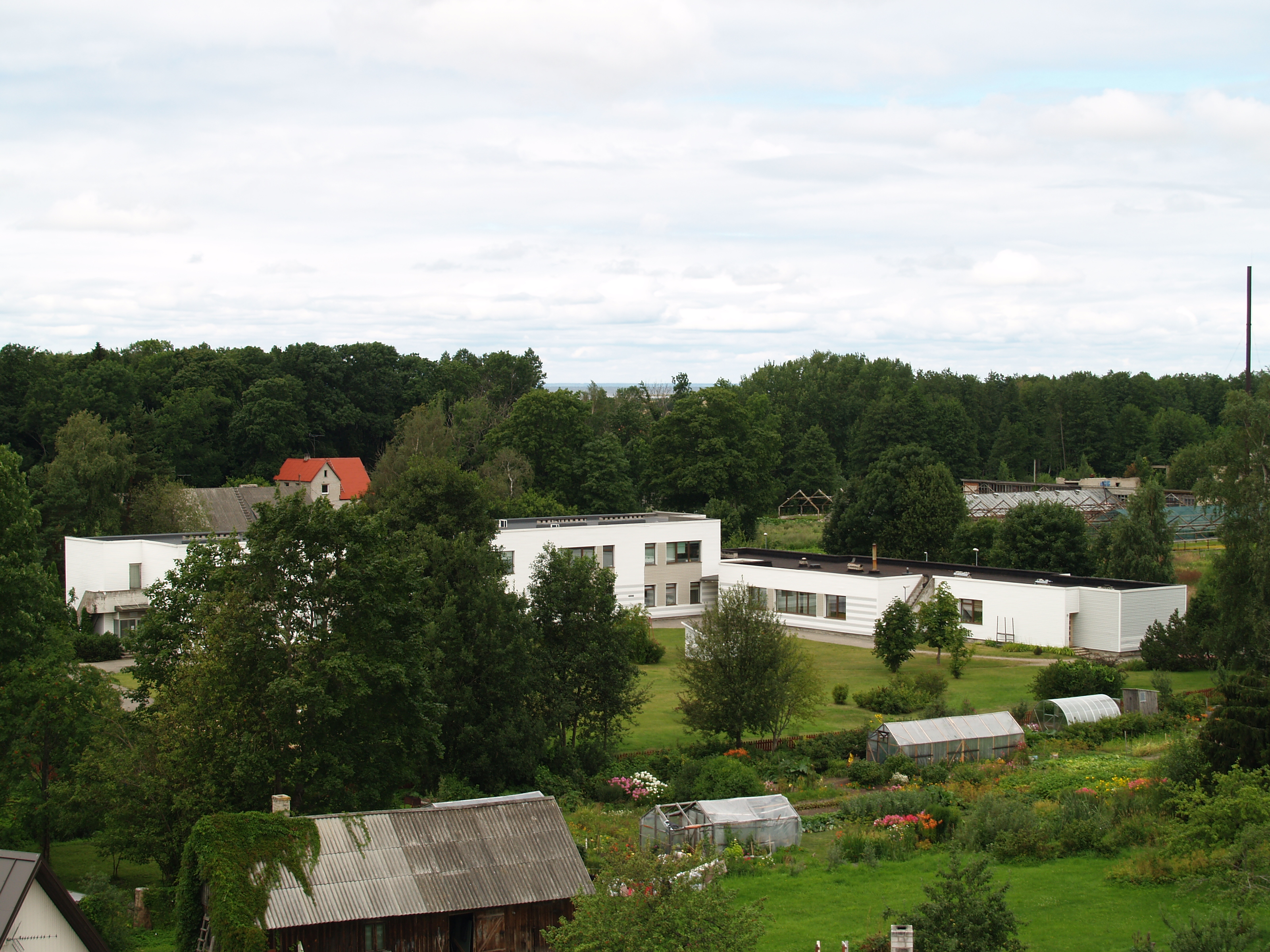
Nursery school

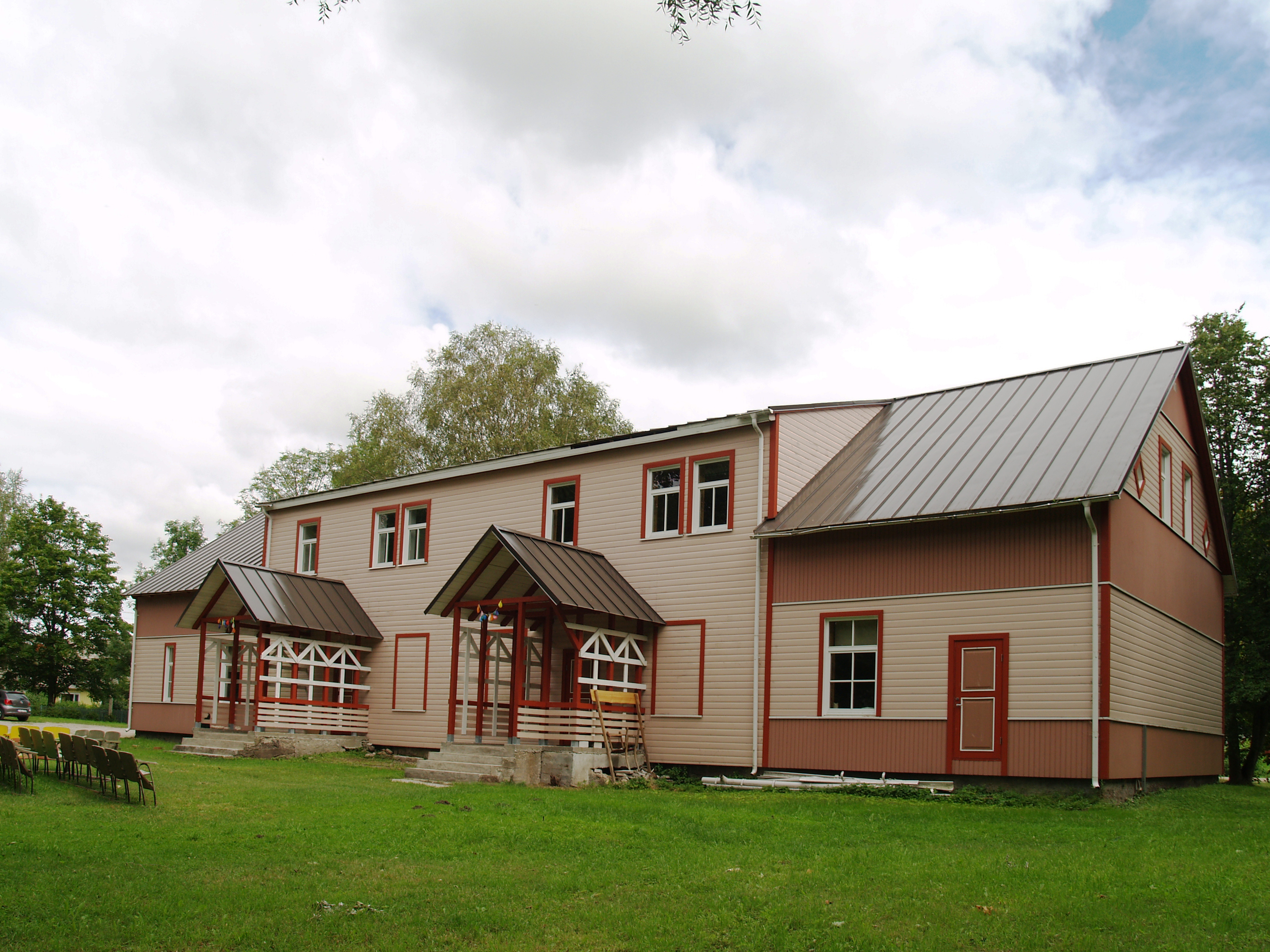
Häädemeeste Society House

The local museum of Häädemeeste

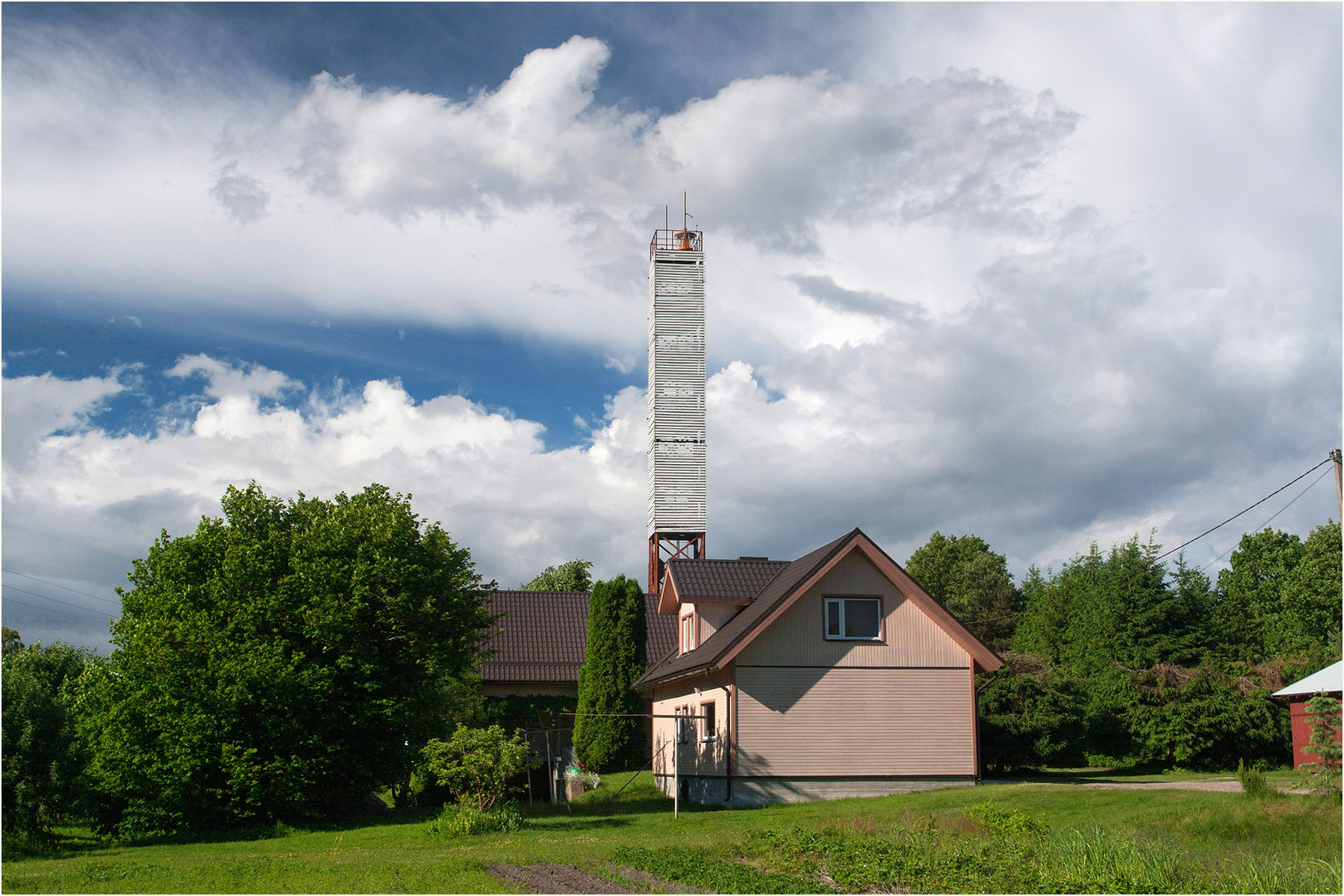
Light beacon

Music school of Häädemeeste

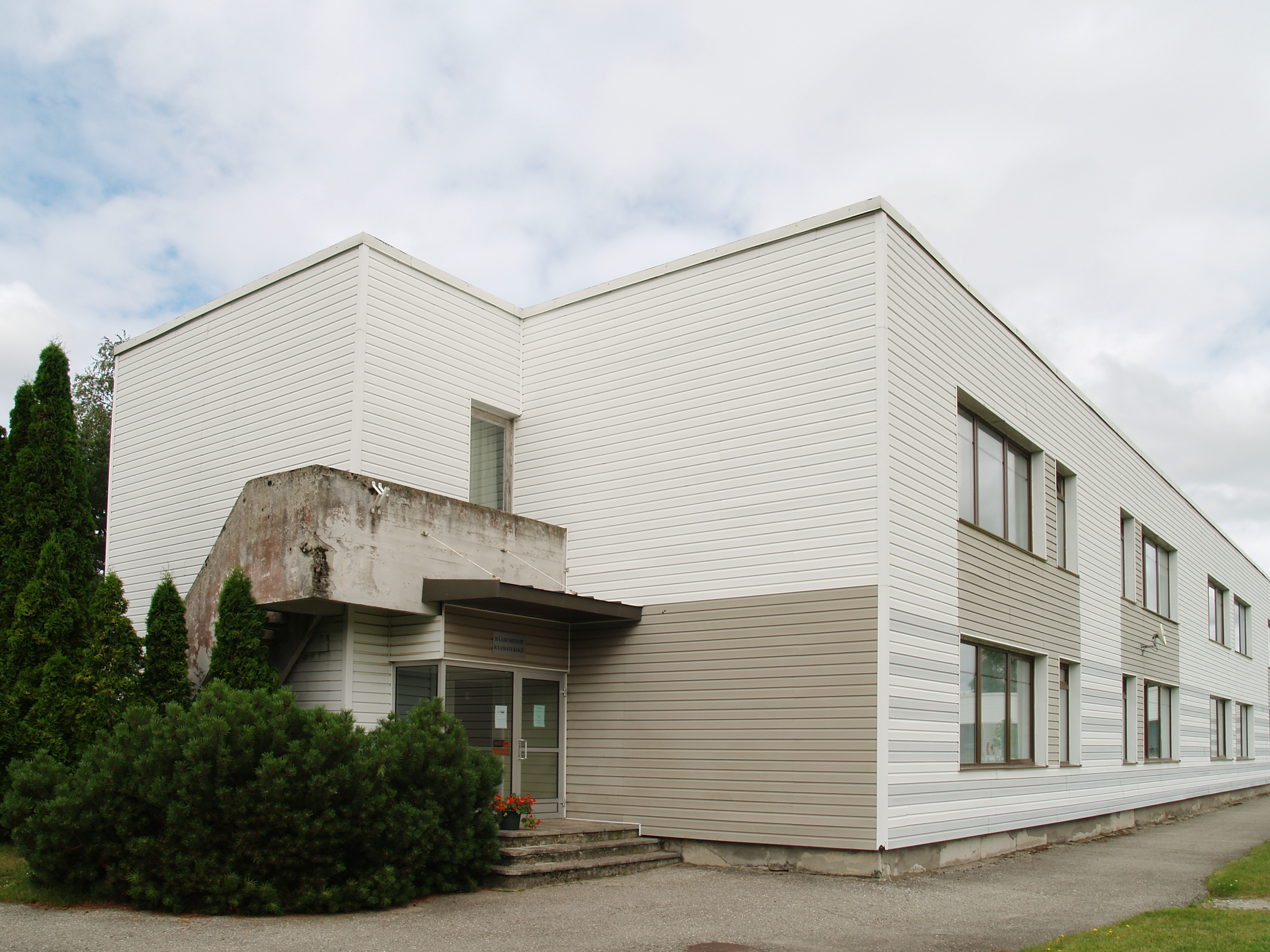
Library in 2012 (since been renovated)

The newly renovated library of Häädemeeste, including the kindergarten

The newly renovated kindergarten of Häädemeeste, including the library

The local busstop of Häädemeeste

The local apothecary (Apteek)

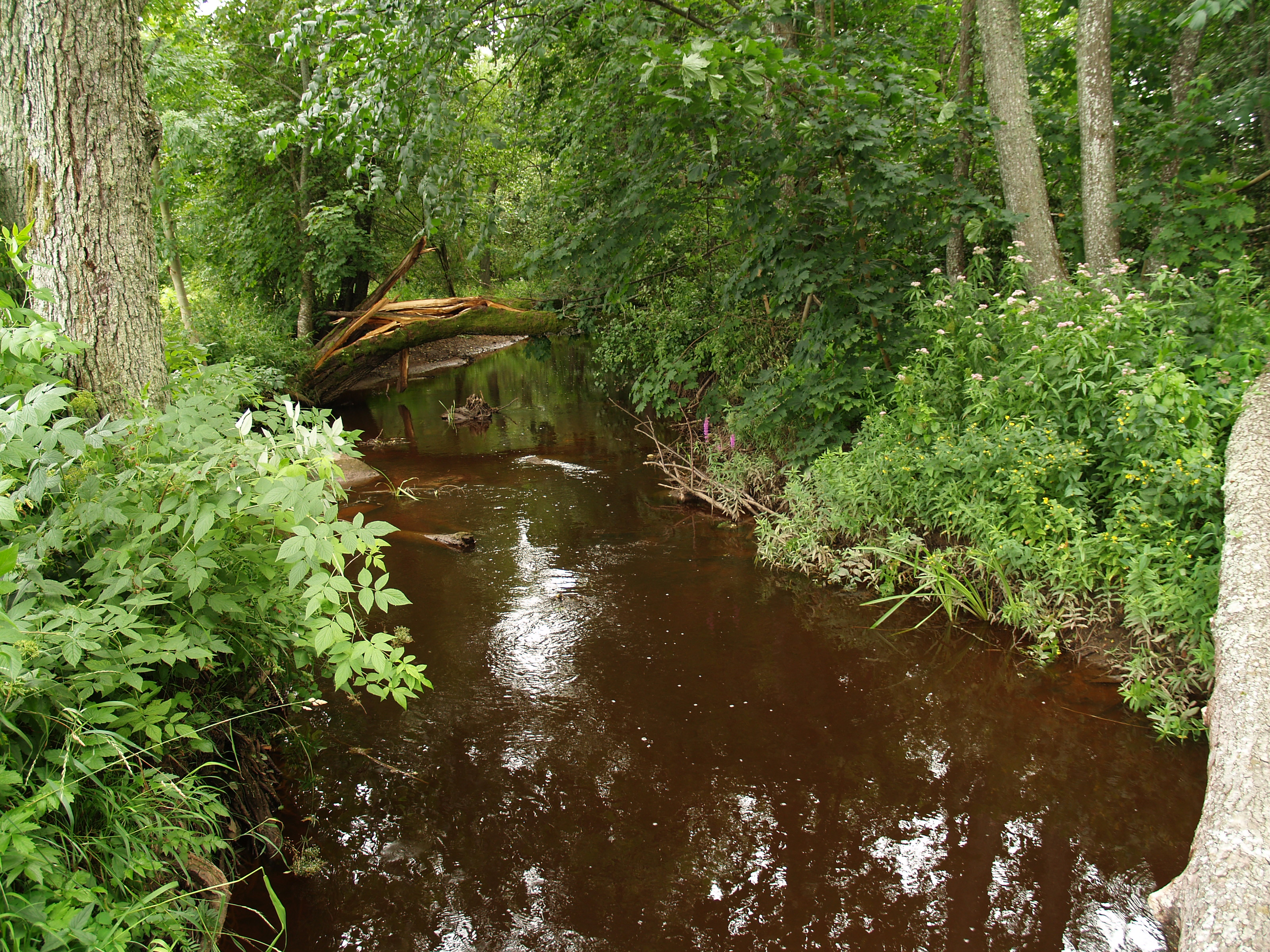
Häädemeeste stream

Tourist doing a local sightseeing tour in Häädemeeste
