= Are, Estonia =

Borough in Estonia

Are
- Small borough
- Location in Estonia
- Coordinates: 58°31′28″N 24°33′39″E
- Country: Estonia
- County: Pärnu County
- Municipality: Tori Parish

Population
  - Total: ~1,300

Are (German: Arrohof) is a small borough (Estonian: alevik) in Tori Parish, Pärnu County, southwestern Estonia. Are has a population of 440.
