= Leina, Pärnu County =

Village in Estonia

Coordinates: 58°13′27″N 24°31′03″E

Leina
- Village
- Interactive map of Leina
- Country: Estonia
- County: Pärnu County
- Parish: Häädemeeste Parish
- Time zone: UTC+2 (EET)
  - Summer (DST): UTC+3 (EEST)

Leina is a village in Häädemeeste Parish, Pärnu County in southwestern Estonia.
