= Kabli =

Village in Estonia

- Village
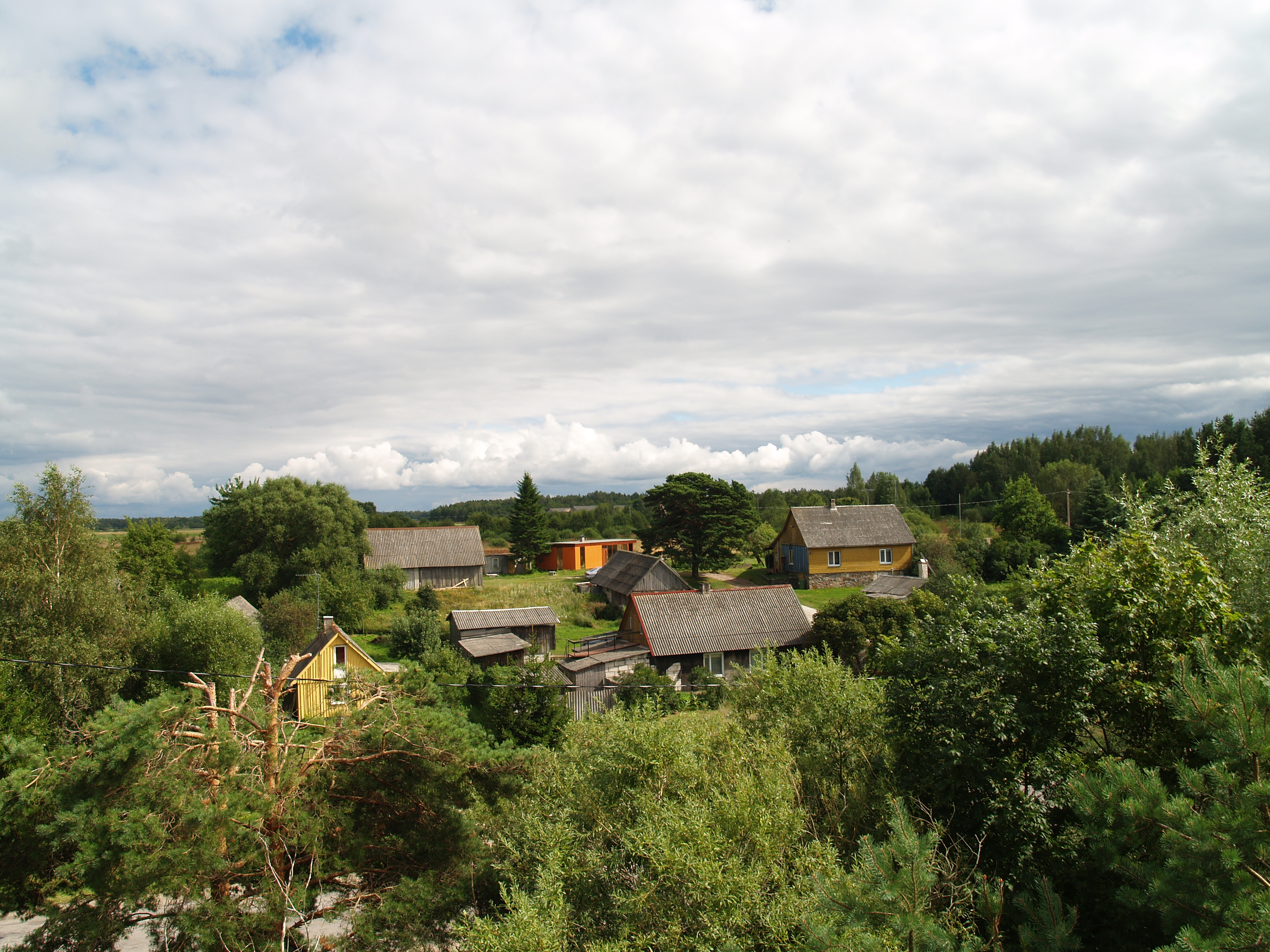

- Location within Estonia
- Coordinates: 57.99986°N 24.43898°E
- Country: Estonia
- County: Pärnu County
- Parish: Häädemeeste Parish
- Time zone: UTC+2 (EET)
  - Summer (DST): UTC+3 (EEST)

Kabli is a village in Estonia. It is located on coast of the Gulf of Riga, in Pärnu County and is a part of Häädemeeste Commune. It has a popular beach.

As of 2000, the population was 373.

In the 19th and 20th century, many seamen lived there. The village had also a shipyard.

== Gallery ==
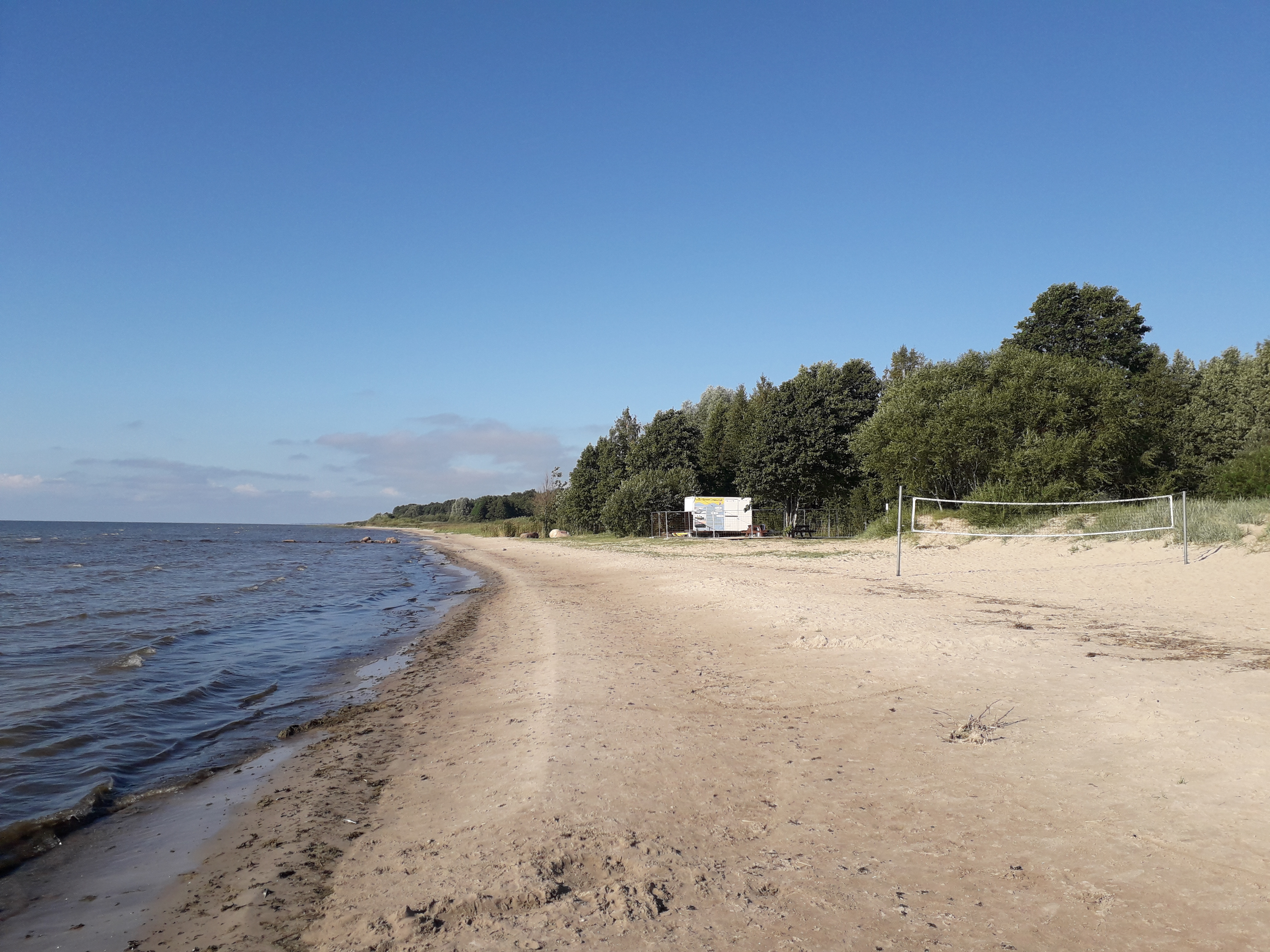
Kabli beach

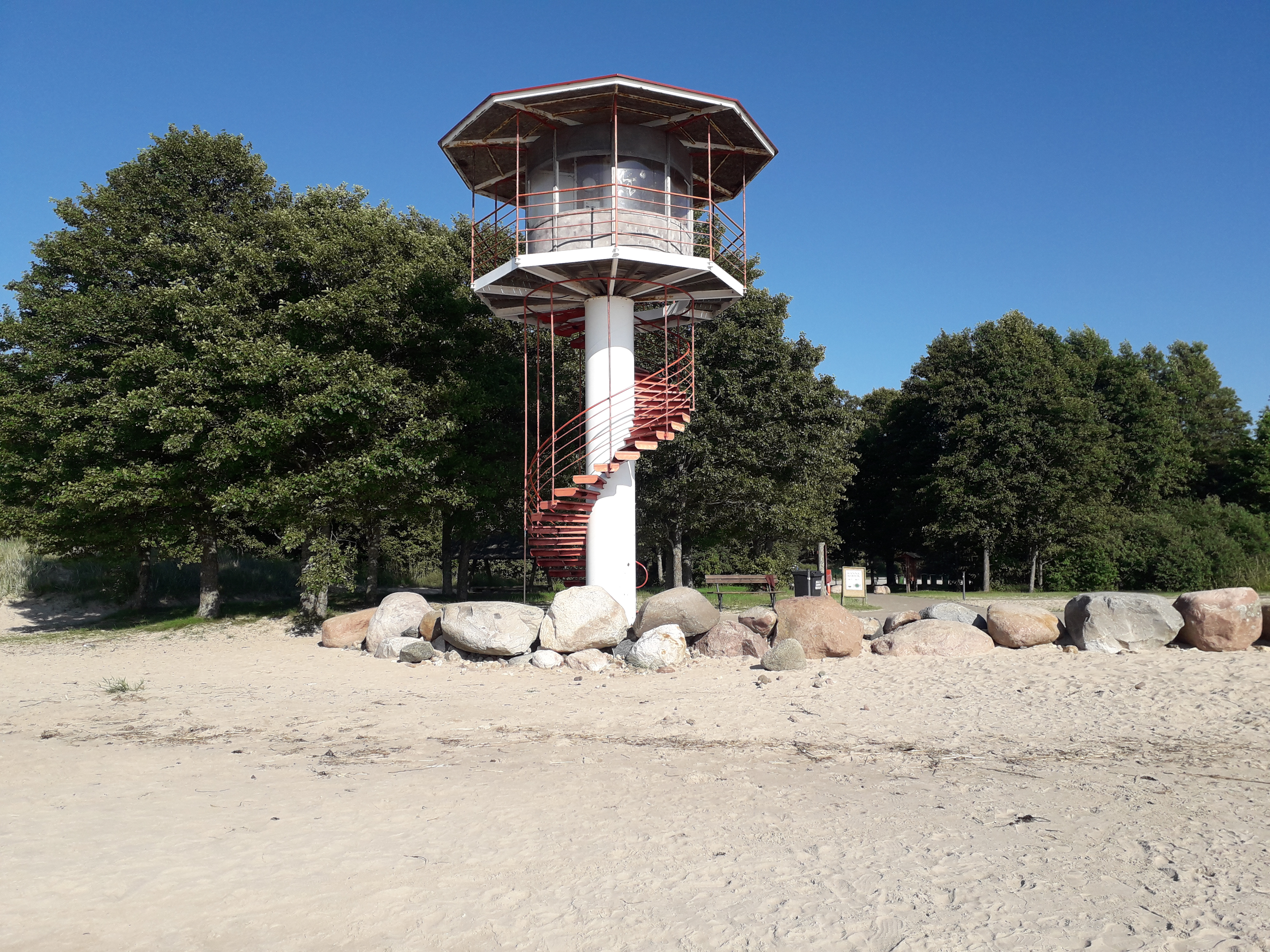
Kabli beach tower

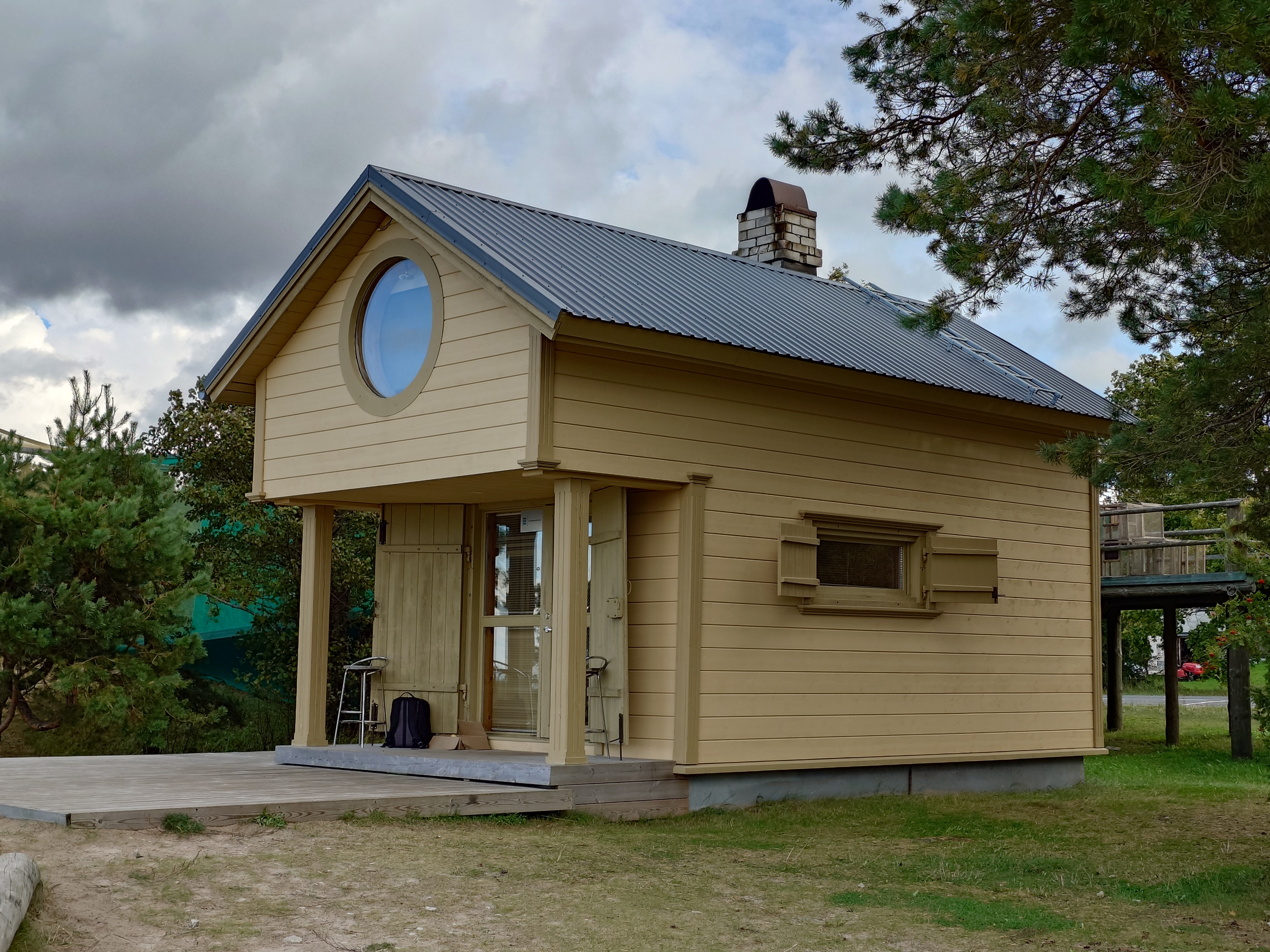
Kabli bird station building

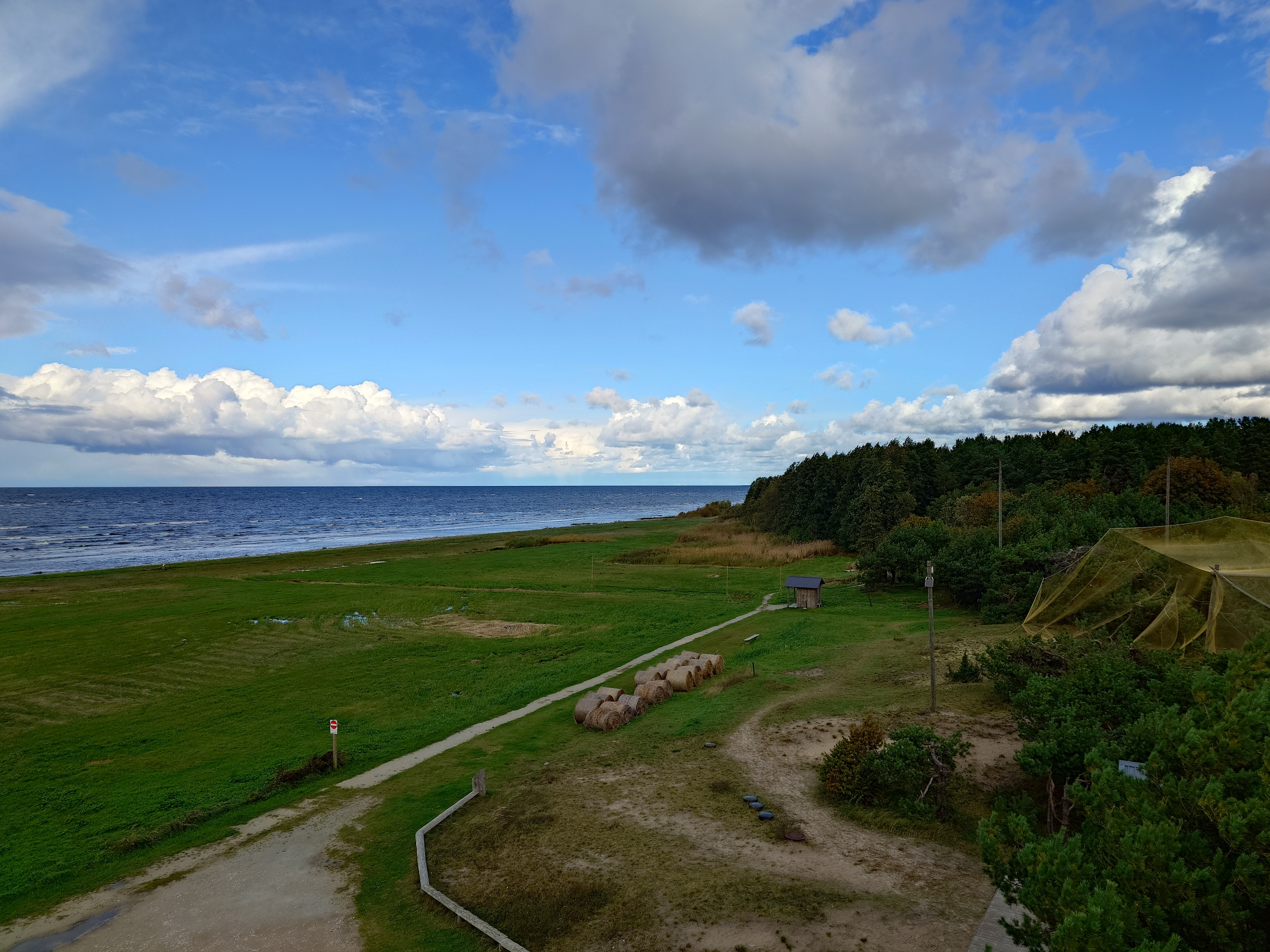
View from birdwatching tower

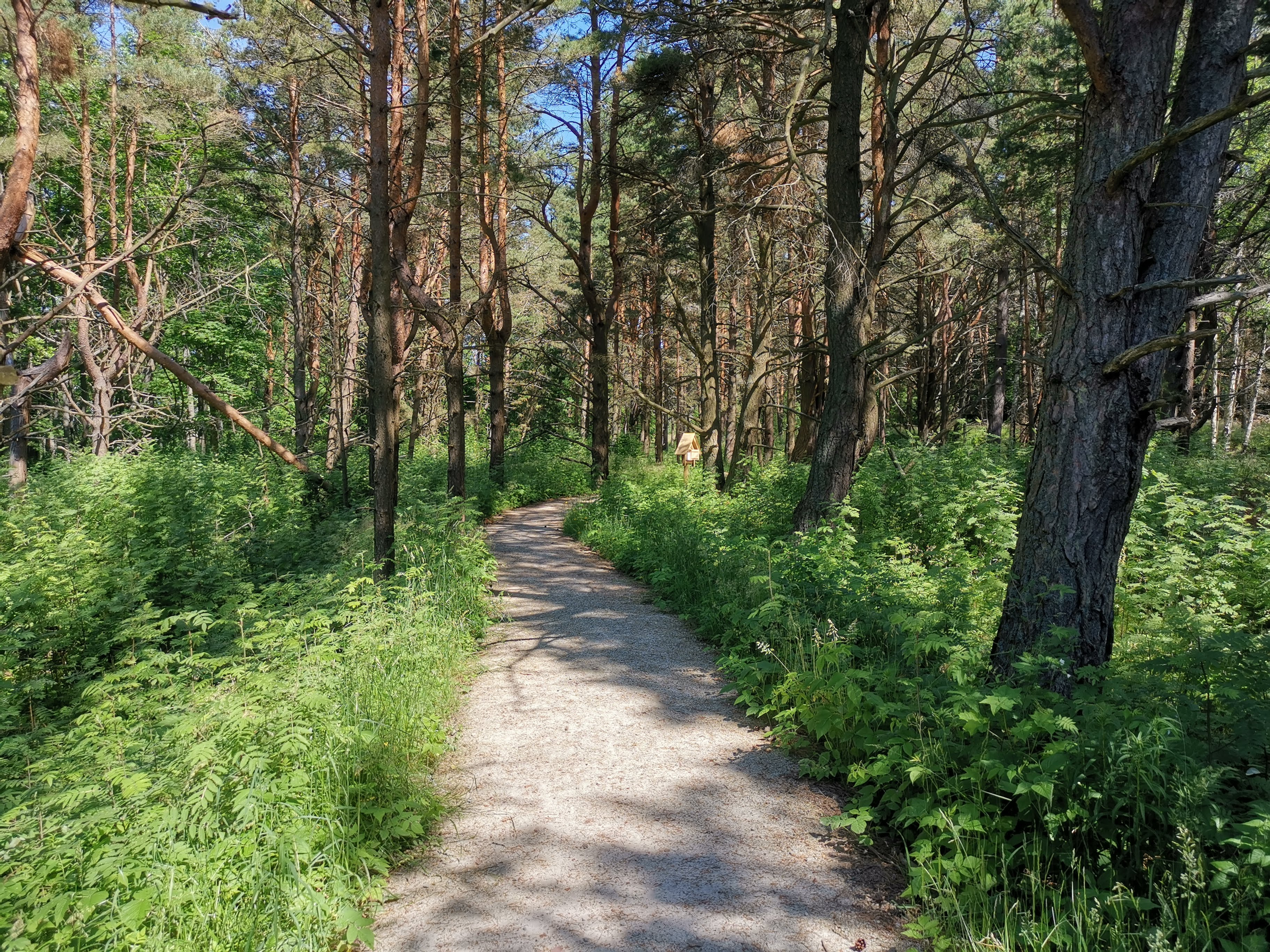
Nature trail

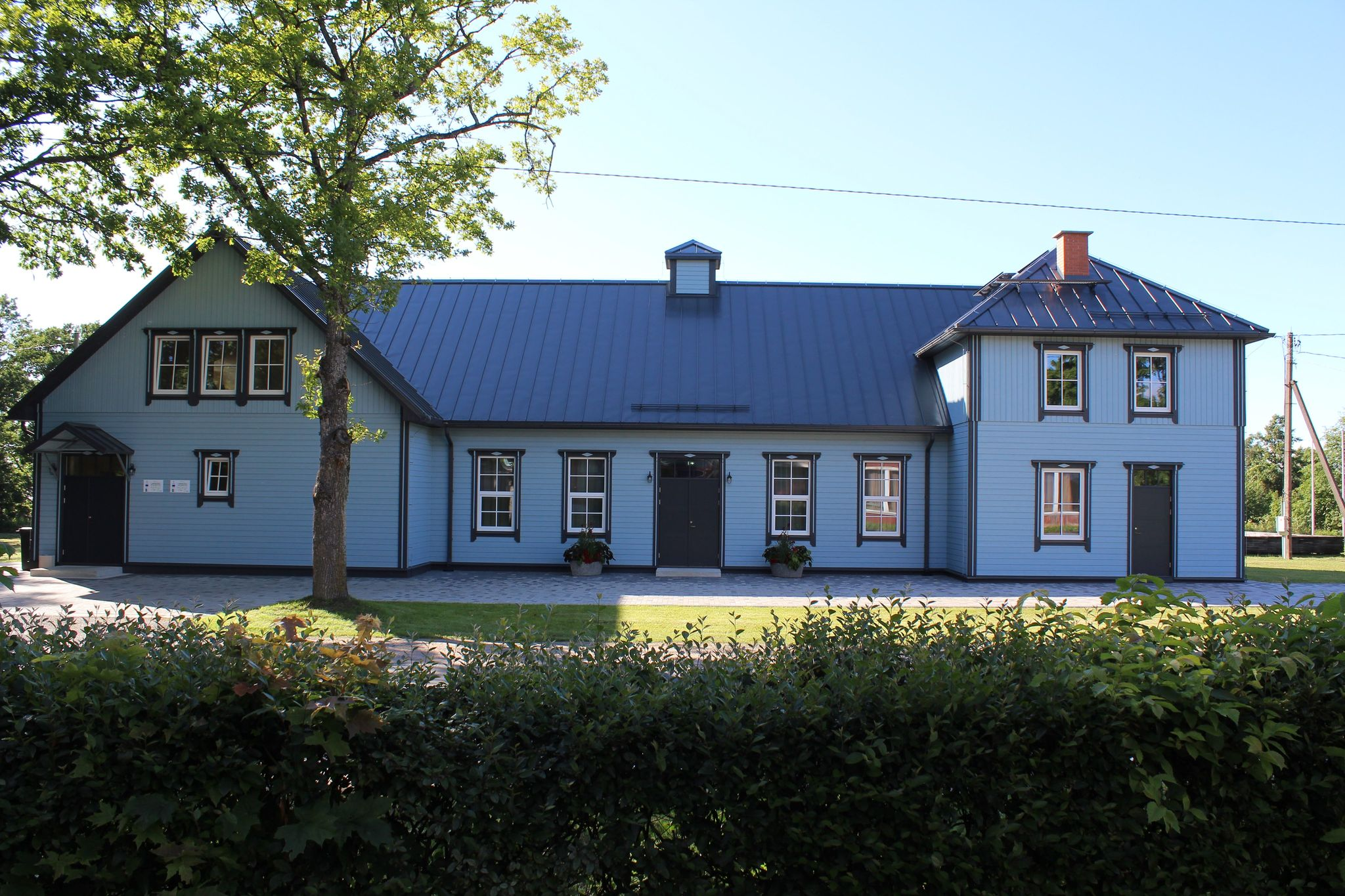
Kabli Seltsimaja (community building)

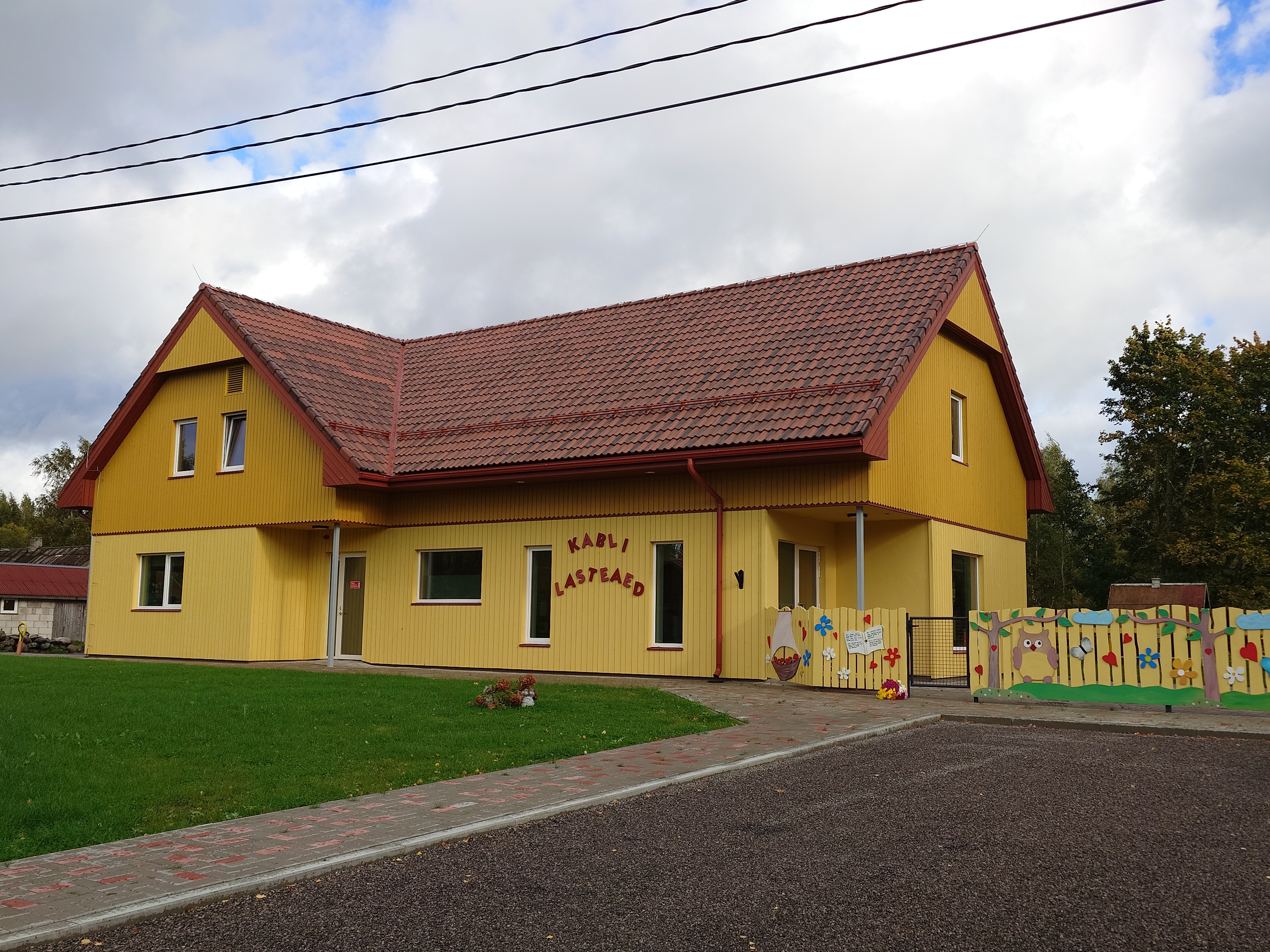
Kabli kindergarten

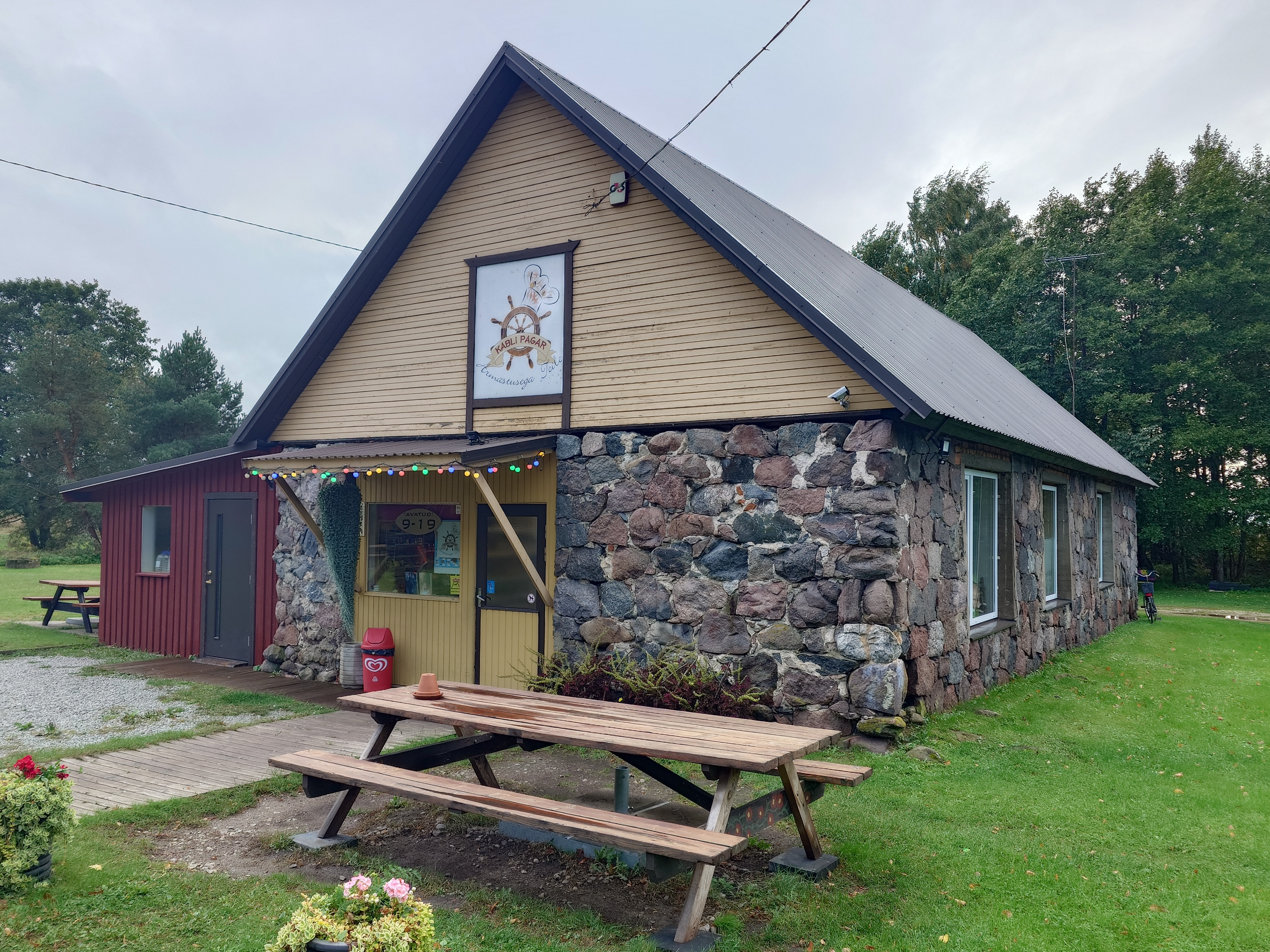
Kabli Pagar (bakery and store)

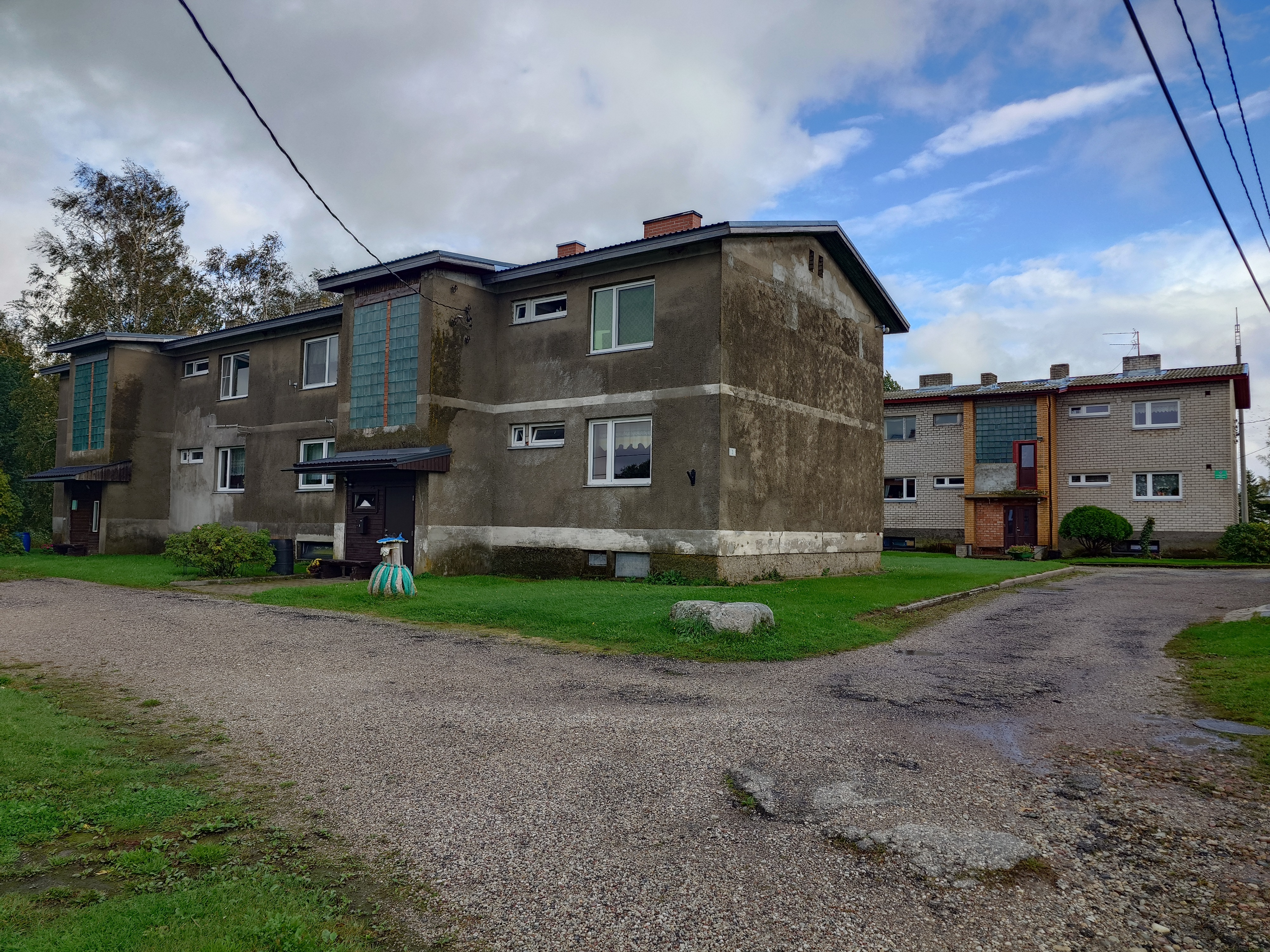
Apartment buildings
