= Urissaare =

Village in Estonia

Coordinates: 58°02′N 24°37′E

- Village
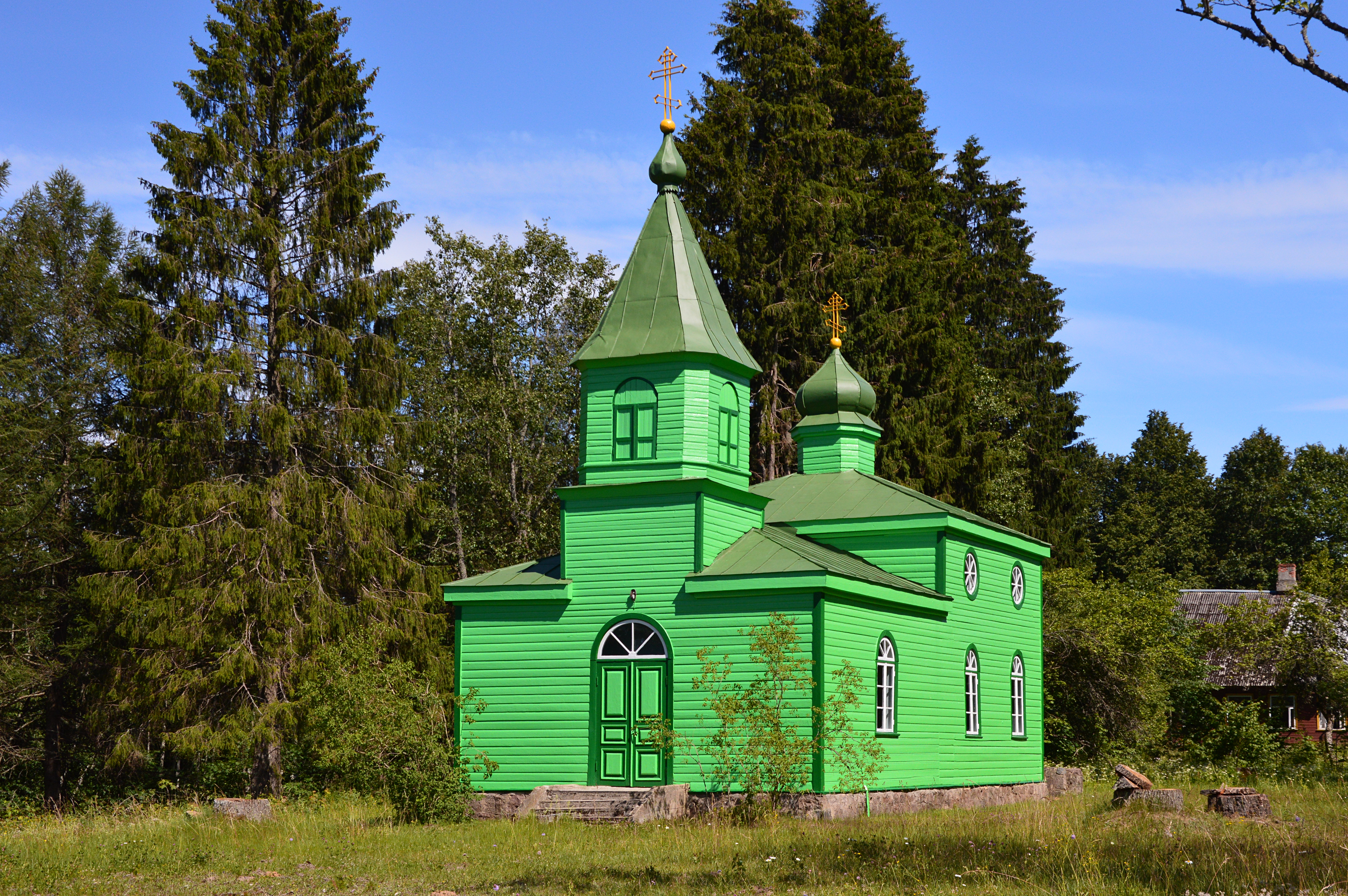
- Laiksaare St. John the Baptist Church in Urissaare
- Interactive map of Urissaare
- Country: Estonia
- County: Pärnu County
- Parish: Häädemeeste Parish
- Time zone: UTC+2 (EET)
  - Summer (DST): UTC+3 (EEST)

Urissaare is a village in Häädemeeste Parish, Pärnu County in southwestern Estonia.
