= Võiste =

Borough in Estonia

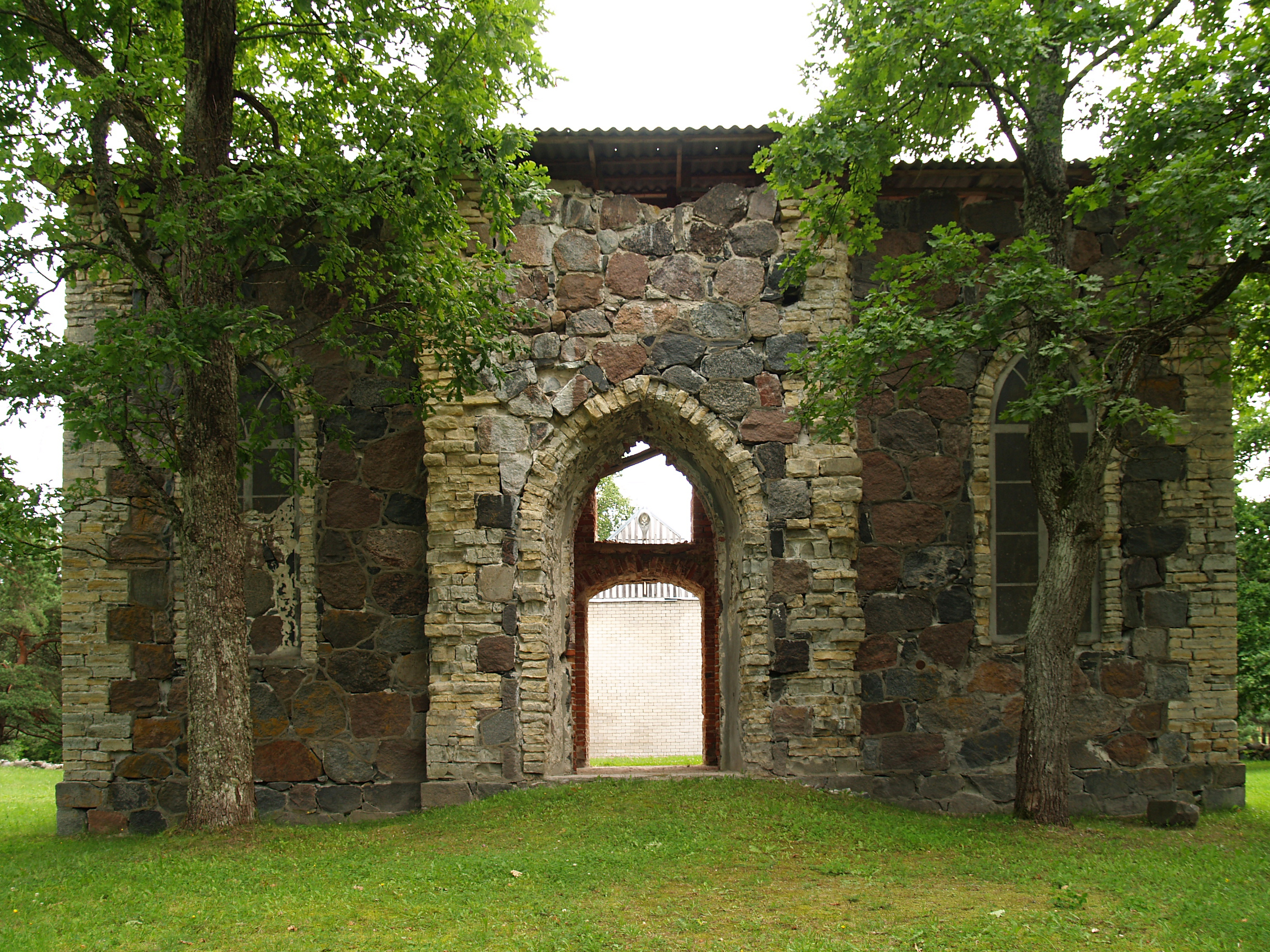
- Ruins of Tahkuranna Lutheran church in Võiste

- Location within Estonia
- Coordinates: 58°12′21″N 24°29′1″E
- Country: Estonia
- County: Pärnu County
- Parish: Häädemeeste Parish
- Time zone: UTC+2 (EET)

Võiste is a small borough (alevik) in Häädemeeste Parish, Pärnu County Estonia.
