= Saue, Saku Parish =

Village in Estonia

Saue
- Village
- Location in Estonia
- Coordinates: 59°18′17″N 24°34′16″E
- Country: Estonia
- County: Harju County
- Municipality: Saku Parish

Population (2011 Census)
  - Total: 114

Saue is a village in Saku Parish, Harju County, Estonia. As of the 2011 census, the settlement's population was 114.

From 1976 to 2014 the village bore the name of Kanama.
