= Plug-in electric vehicles in Estonia =

As of October 2022, there were about 3,300 electric vehicles in Estonia. As of 2022, 3% of new cars sold in Estonia were electric.

== Government policy ==
As of July 2022, the Estonian government offers subsidies of up to €5,000 for electric car purchases.

== Charging stations ==
As of October 2022, there were about 400 public charging stations in Estonia.

Starting in 2025, all new public parking lots constructed must be equipped with infrastructure for electric car charging.

== Public opinion ==
In a 2022 survey conducted by EY, 52% of respondents said that they would prefer to buy an electric car for their next car purchase.
