= Metsaküla, Häädemeeste Parish =

Village in Estonia

Coordinates: 58°14′55″N 24°31′11″E

Metsaküla
- Village
- Interactive map of Metsaküla
- Country: Estonia
- County: Pärnu County
- Parish: Häädemeeste Parish
- Time zone: UTC+2 (EET)
  - Summer (DST): UTC+3 (EEST)

Metsaküla is a village in Häädemeeste Parish, Pärnu County in southwestern Estonia.
