= Varbola =

Village in Estonia

Coordinates: 59°03′N 24°27′E

- Village
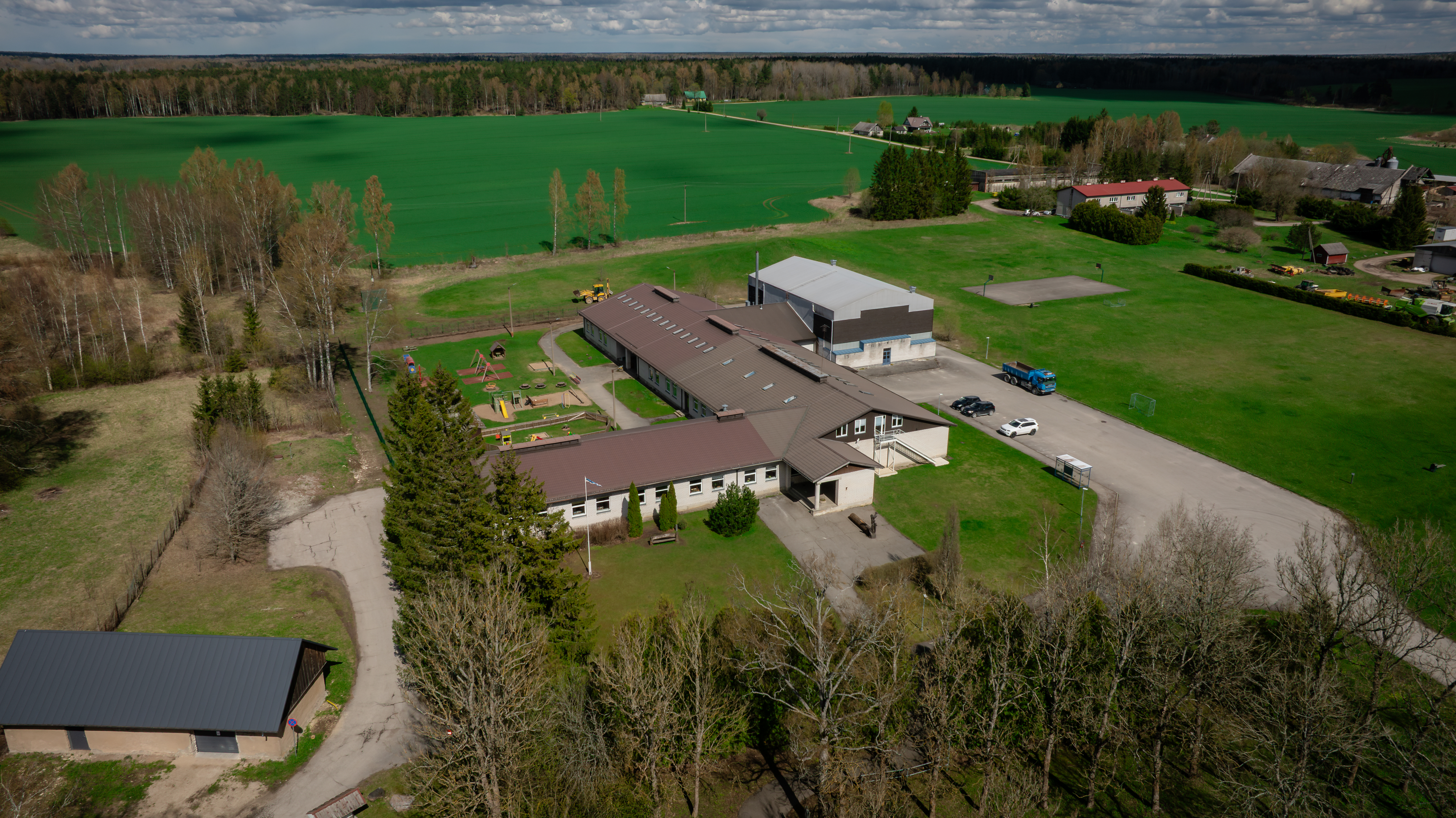
- Varbola Kindergarten-Primary School
- Interactive map of Varbola
- Country: Estonia
- County: Rapla County
- Parish: Märjamaa Parish
- Time zone: UTC+2 (EET)
  - Summer (DST): UTC+3 (EEST)

Varbola is a village in Märjamaa Parish, Rapla County, in western Estonia.

== See also ==
- Varbola Stronghold
