= Ikla =

Village in Estonia

- Village
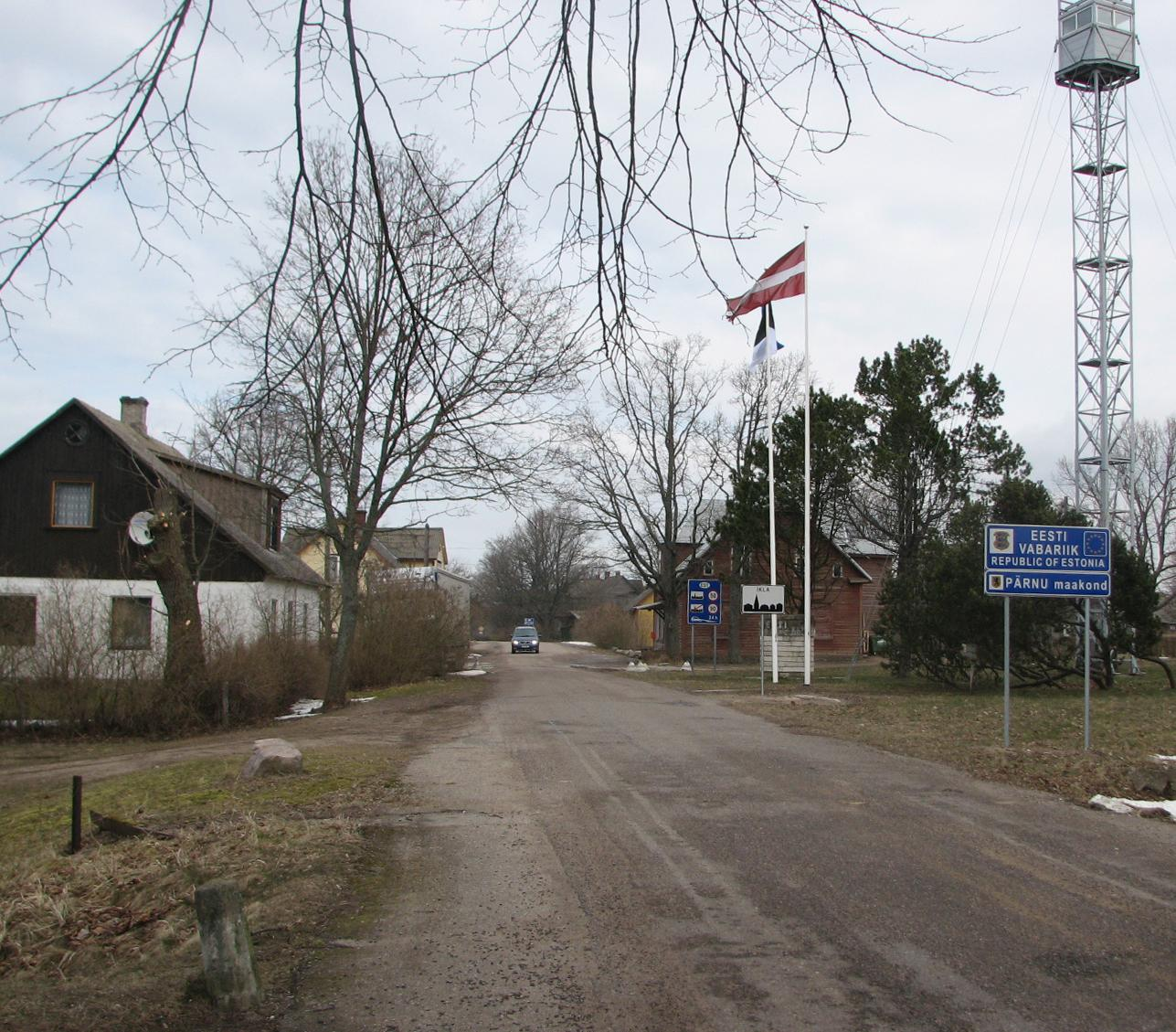
- Ikla

- Location in Estonia
- Coordinates: 57°52′37″N 24°21′44″E
- Country: Estonia
- County: Pärnu county
- District: Häädemeeste Parish

Population (25 March 2009)
  - Total: 180
- Time zone: UTC+2 (EET)
  - Summer (DST): UTC+3 (EEST)

Ikla is a village in Häädemeeste Parish, Pärnu County, Estonia. The village lies on the Via Baltica (European route E67), on the Estonian–Latvian Border, opposite the Latvian town of Ainaži.

== Gallery ==
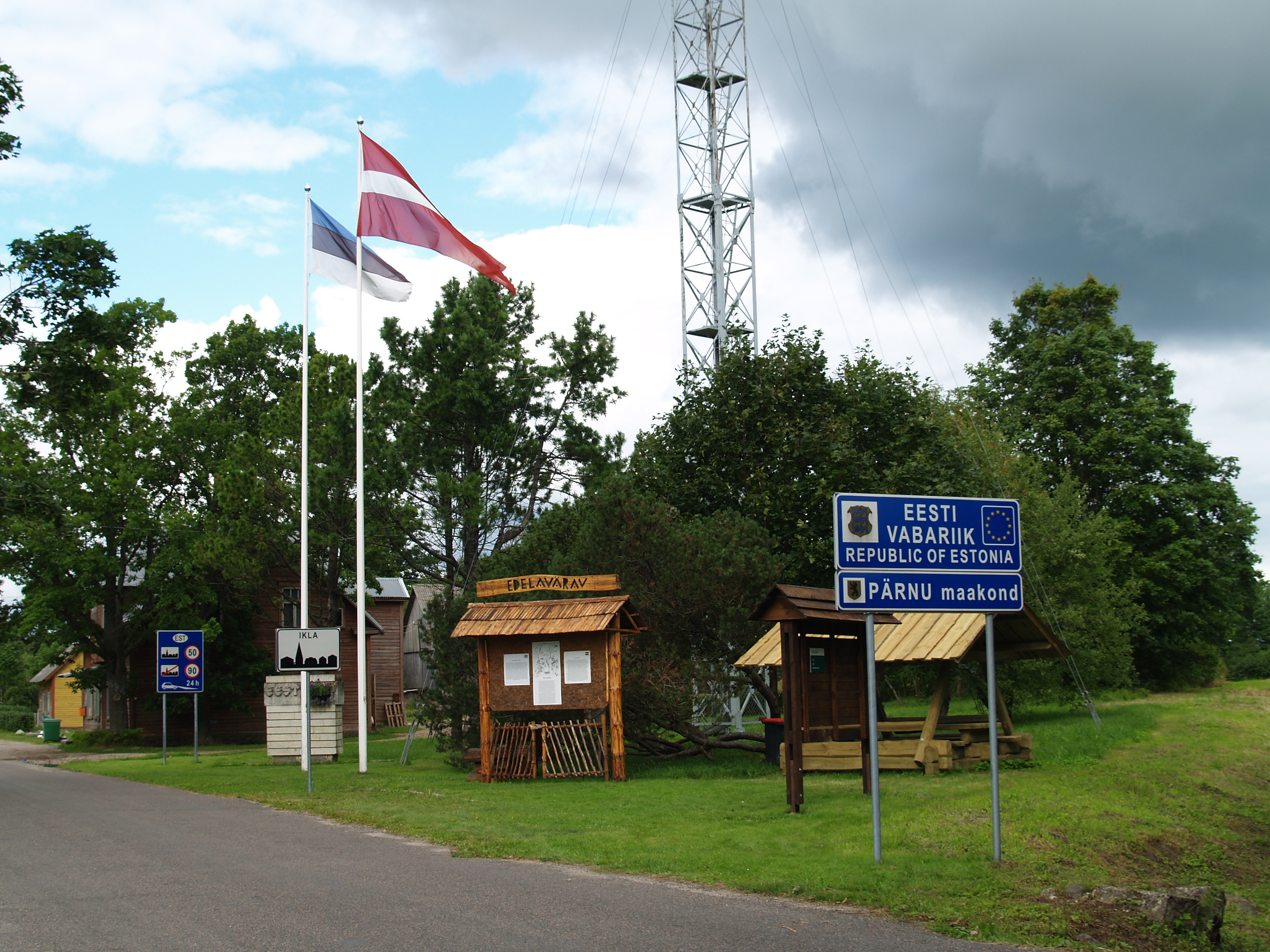
The Estonian-Latvian border

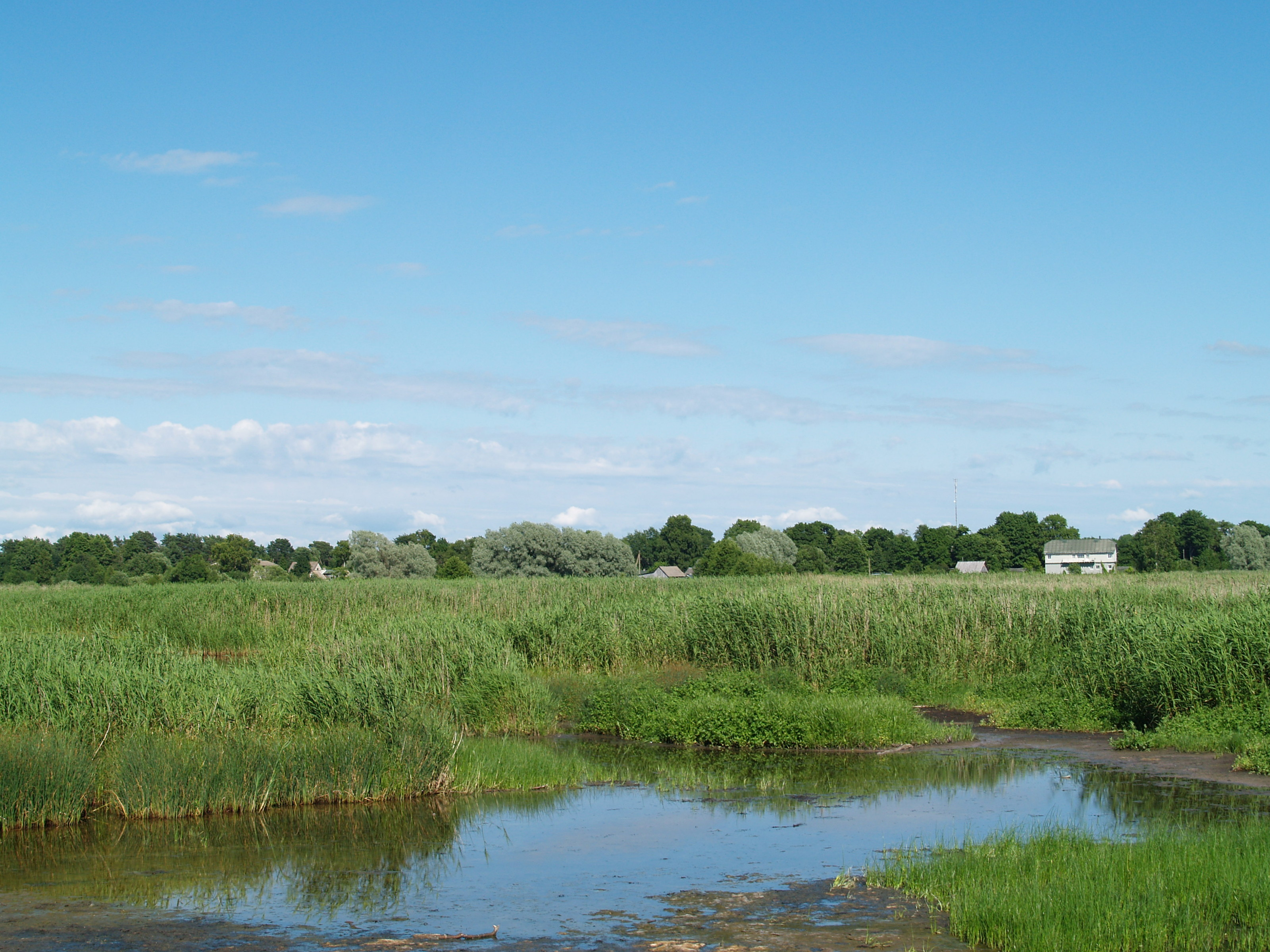
View of Ikla from the north pier of Ainaži, Latvia
