= Ääsmäe =

Village in Estonia

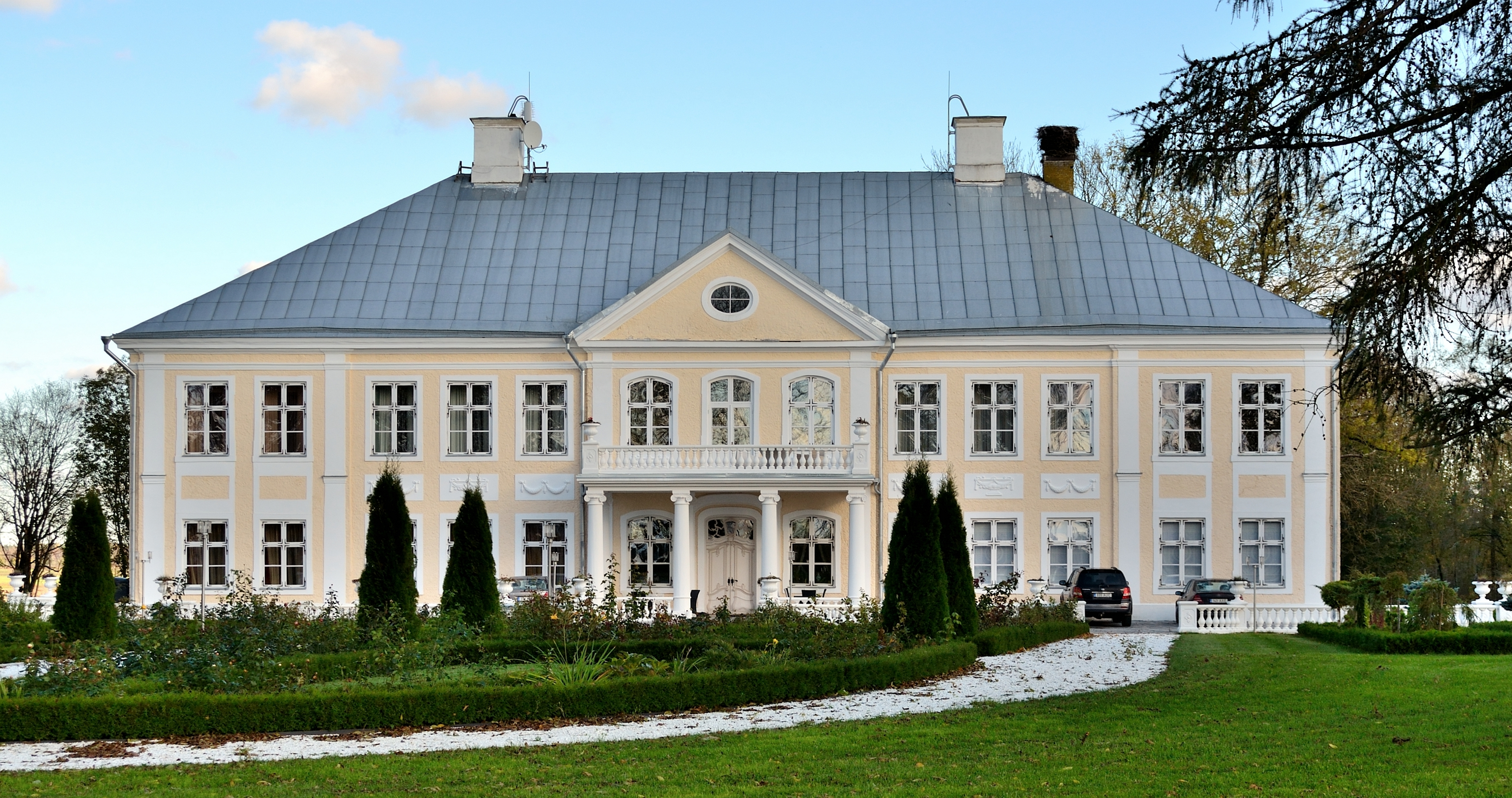
- Ääsmäe Manor

- Location within Estonia Location within Europe
- Coordinates: 59°14′17″N 24°30′31″E
- Country: Estonia
- County: Harju County
- Time zone: UTC+2 (EET)

Ääsmäe is a village in Saue Parish, Harju County in northern Estonia.

== Ääsmäe manor ==
The manor in Ääsmäe traces its origins to 1574, when king John III of Sweden presented the estate as a gift to his secretary Johann Berends. The present building was built in the 1770s when the manor was under the ownership of the Baltic German family von Toll, possibly by designs made by architect Johann Schultz. It is a stylish early classicist ensemble with several preserved original details.
