= Uulu =

Village in Estonia

Coordinates: 58°17′N 24°35′E

- Village
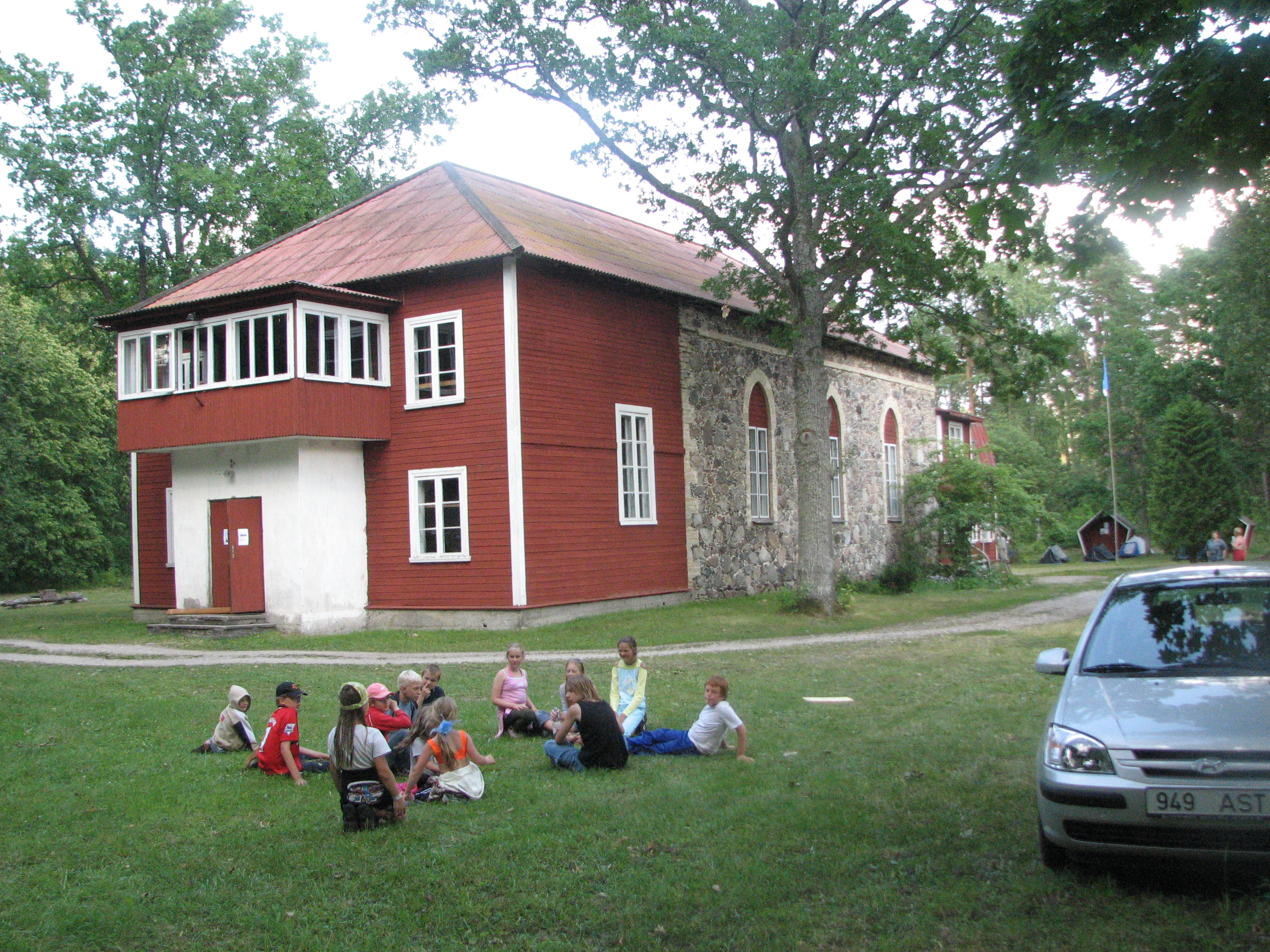
- Interactive map of Uulu
- Country: Estonia
- County: Pärnu County
- Parish: Häädemeeste Parish
- Time zone: UTC+2 (EET)
  - Summer (DST): UTC+3 (EEST)

Uulu is a village in Häädemeeste Parish, Pärnu County, in southwestern Estonia.

== Name ==
Uulu was attested in historical sources as Ulen in 1560 (referring to the village) and 1601 (referring to the manor), and Uhla in 1797. The origin of the name is uncertain. It has been suggested that it may be an adaptation of the personal name Olav or may be related to the word uule, standard Estonian uure '(erosion) furrow'.
