= List of rivers of Estonia =

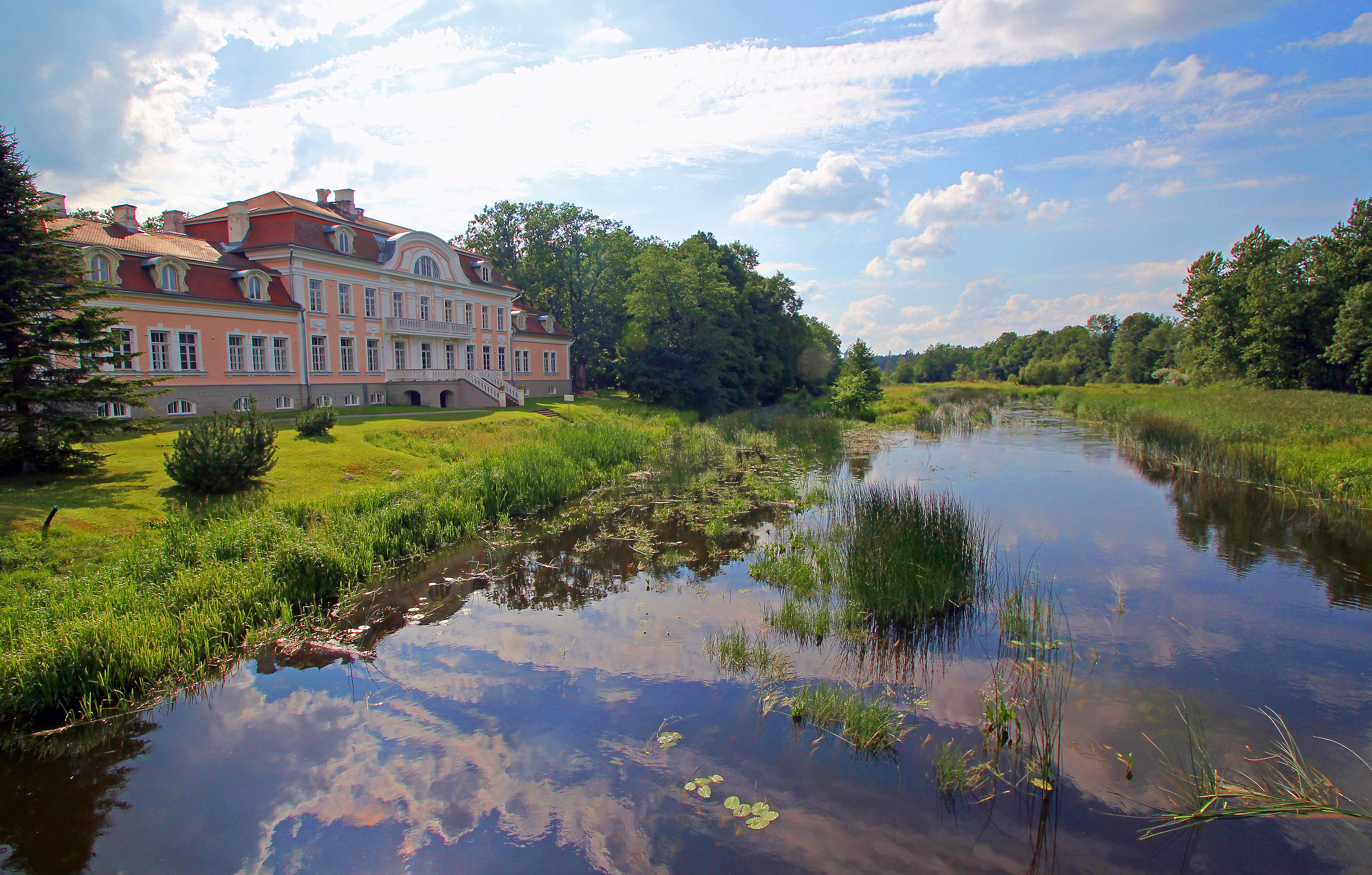
The Pärnu River flowing past Laupa manor house

Rivers of Estonia are short and mostly have a small discharge. Only 10 rivers are longer than 100 km. The largest river is the Narva (length 77 km) on the Estonian–Russian border, whose average discharge is larger than that of all other Estonian rivers combined.

== Longest rivers ==
#	Name	Length (km)	Basin (km^{2})
1.	Võhandu	162	1,420
2.	Pärnu	144	6,920
3.	Põltsamaa	135	1,310
4.	Pedja	122	2,710
5.	Keila	116	682
6.	Kasari	112	3,210
7.	Piusa	109	796
8.	Pirita	105	799
9.	Emajõgi	101	9,740
10.	Navesti	100	3,000

== List of rivers ==
List is incomplete.

Name	Length (km)	Basin (km^{2})	Location (county)	Further info	Image
Aavoja	23	69.1	Harju County		
Agali Ditch/River	1.9				
Ahja	103.4				
Alajõgi	29				
Allika	27.7				
Ambla					
Amme					
Angerja Creek	28.3				
Anija Creek					
Antsla	23				
Apna					
Ärma					
Aruküla					
Aruoja					
Atla					
Audru					
Avaste Creek	12.0				
Avijõgi					
Emajõgi					
Elbu					
Elva					
Enge					
Ema					
Esna	25				
Gorodenka					
Häädemeeste	18				
Haavakivi					
Halliste					
Härjapea				Former river	
Harku Creek					
Helme					
Hilba					
Hirmuse	22				
Humalaste					
Hundikuristiku Creek					
Hüüru					
Ilmatsalu	23				
Iskna					
Jaama River	16.0				
Jaama Creek	5.8				
Jägala					
Jänijõgi					
Järveotsa Creek					
Järvoja	1.5	5.5	Lääne-Viru County		
Jõelähtme					
Jõku					
Jurga Creek					
Juudaoja					
Kääpa					
Kalita Creek					
Kalli					
Kargaja					
Kärla	17				
Käru					
Kasari					
Kata					
Katku Creek					
Kavilda					
Keila				Keila Falls	
Kiruoja					
Kiudu	3.0				
Kivioja					
Kloostri					
Kodila	26				
Kohtla	29				
Kohtra					
Kolga	15				
Kolga Creek					
Kondi Creek					
Koreli Creek					
Kõpu					
Koosa					
Kroodi Creek	5.2	23.8	Harju County, Maardu		
Kubija Creek					
Kudruküla Creek	11		Ida-Viru County		
Kuivajõgi					
Kuke					
Külge Creek					
Kulgu					
Kullavere					
Kunda					
Kurina					
Kurna Creek					
Kuura					
Laatre					
Laeva					
Lahavere Creek					
Lähkma					
Laugi	17.8				
Leevi					
Leisi					
Leivajõgi	23				
Lemmejõgi					
Lemmjõgi					
Liivi					
Lintsi					
Lodja Creek					
Loo					
Loobu					
Lõve					
Luguse					
Luutsna					
Maadevahe	8.0				
Mädajõgi					
Mädara					
Mäetaguse	25				
Mägara					
Mähe Creek					
Maidla					
Massu					
Mõra					
Mudajõgi	16				
Mulkoja					
Munalaskme Creek					
Mustajõgi					
Mustjõgi (Endla)					
Mustjõgi (Gauja basin)					
Mustjõgi (Jägala basin)	38.1				
Mustjõgi (Tallinn)					
Mustoja (Lahemaa)					
Mustvee					
Muuga Creek					
Nahavere Creek					
Naravere Creek					
Narva				Part of the Estonia–Russia border	
Nasva					
Navesti					
Nõmme	13.3				
Nõva	22.0				
Nurtu					
Nuutri	11				
Õhne					
Ohukotsu	12.1				
Onga					
Õngu	6.8				
Orajõgi					
Paadrema	30				
Paala					
Pääsküla					
Pada					
Pala					
Pale					
Palgissaare Creek					
Paltra					
Pärlijõgi					
Pärnu					
Paunküla Creek					
Pede					
Pedeli					
Pedja					
Peeda					
Peetri					
Penijõgi	11.0				
Piigaste Creek					
Piilsi					
Pikknurme					
Pikva Creek					
Pirita					
Piusa					
Põduste					
Põltsamaa					
Porijõgi					
Poruni	11				
Prandi					
Preedi					
Pühajõgi (Ida-Virumaa)					
Pühajõgi (Saaremaa)					
Punapea					
Purtse					
Jõelähtme					
Raasiku (Jõelähtme)					
Rannametsa					
Rannamõisa					
Rannapungerja					
Räpu	20.8				
Raudna					
Raudoja	12			location of Raudoja Reservoir	
Reiu					
Reopalu					
Retla					
Riguldi					
Rõngu	26				
Saarjõgi					
Sae Creek					
Saki					
Saku (Vääna)					
Salajõgi					
Salla					
Salme	4.4				
Sämi					
Sauga					
Selja					
Sigaste Creek					
Sillaotsa	15.3				
Sitapätsi					
Sõmeru	15				
Soodla					
Sõtke					
Struuga (Jaama)					
Surju Creek					
Surjupera Creek					
Suuremõisa	16				
Taebla					
Tagajõgi					
Tänassilma					
Tarvastu					
Tatra					
Teenuse					
Timmkanal					
Tirtsi					
Tiskre Creek					
Tõdva					
Tõlla Creek					
Toolse					
Topi					
Tori					
Tõrvajõgi					
Tõrvanõmme Creek					
Tõstamaa	3.8				
Treppoja					
Tuhala					
Tuudi	27.8				
Ulila					
Umbusi					
Unguma	10.1				
Ura					
Uueveski Creek	5.2	23.8	Viljandi County		
Uruste Creek					
Vääna					
Vaemla					
Vahejõgi	1.3				
Vaidava					
Väike Emajõgi					
Vainupea					
Valgejõgi					
Valuoja	9.3	13.6	Viljandi County		
Vanajõgi	8.0				
Vändra					
Vara Creek					
Vardi					
Vardja					
Varsaallika Creek					
Värska Creek					
Vasalemma					
Vaskjõgi					
Veelikse Creek					
Velise					
Verioja					
Veskijõgi	11.6				
Vigala					
Vihterpalu					
Visela					
Visula					
Vodja					
Võhandu				The longest river entirely in Estonia	
Võhkse					
Võhu					
Võlupe					
Vorsti					
Võsu					
