= Tahkuranna Parish =

Former municipality of Estonia

Coordinates: 58°15′N 24°29′E

Tahkuranna Parish Tahkuranna vald
- Former municipality of Estonia
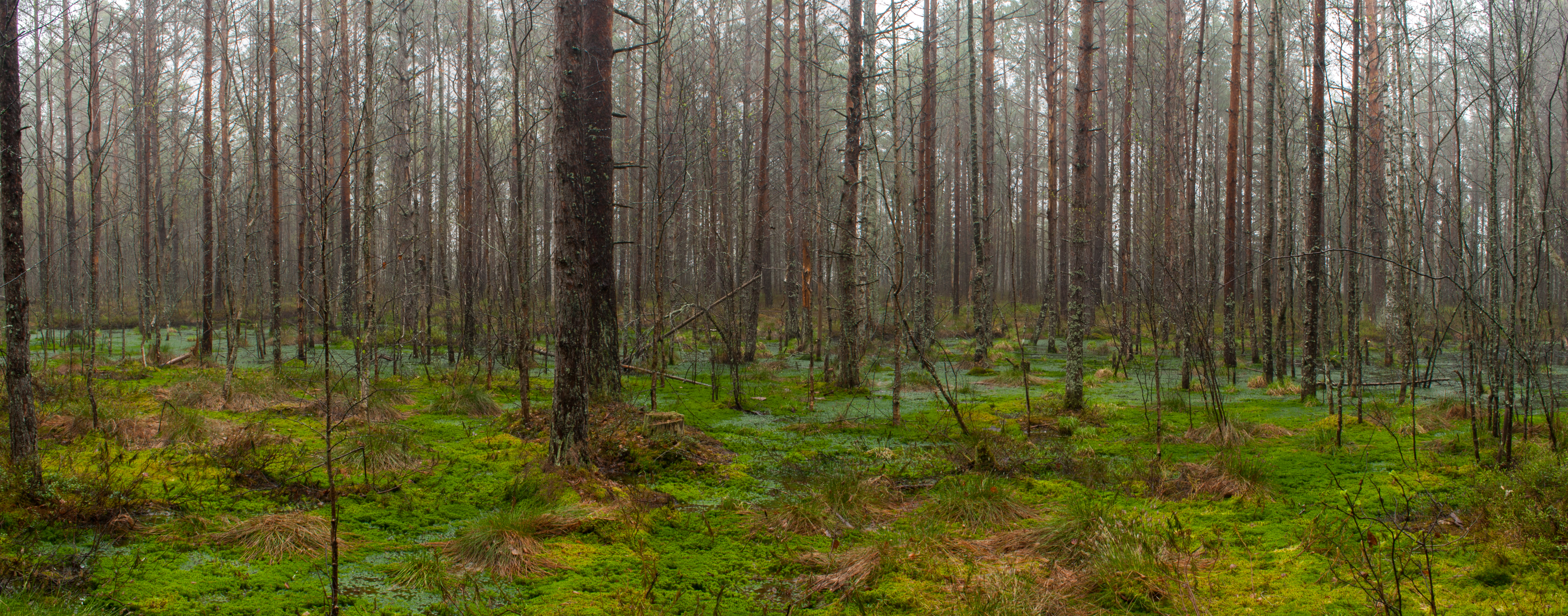
- Tolkuse bog

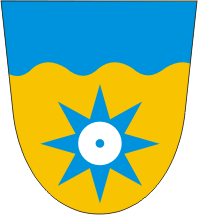
- Flag Coat of arms

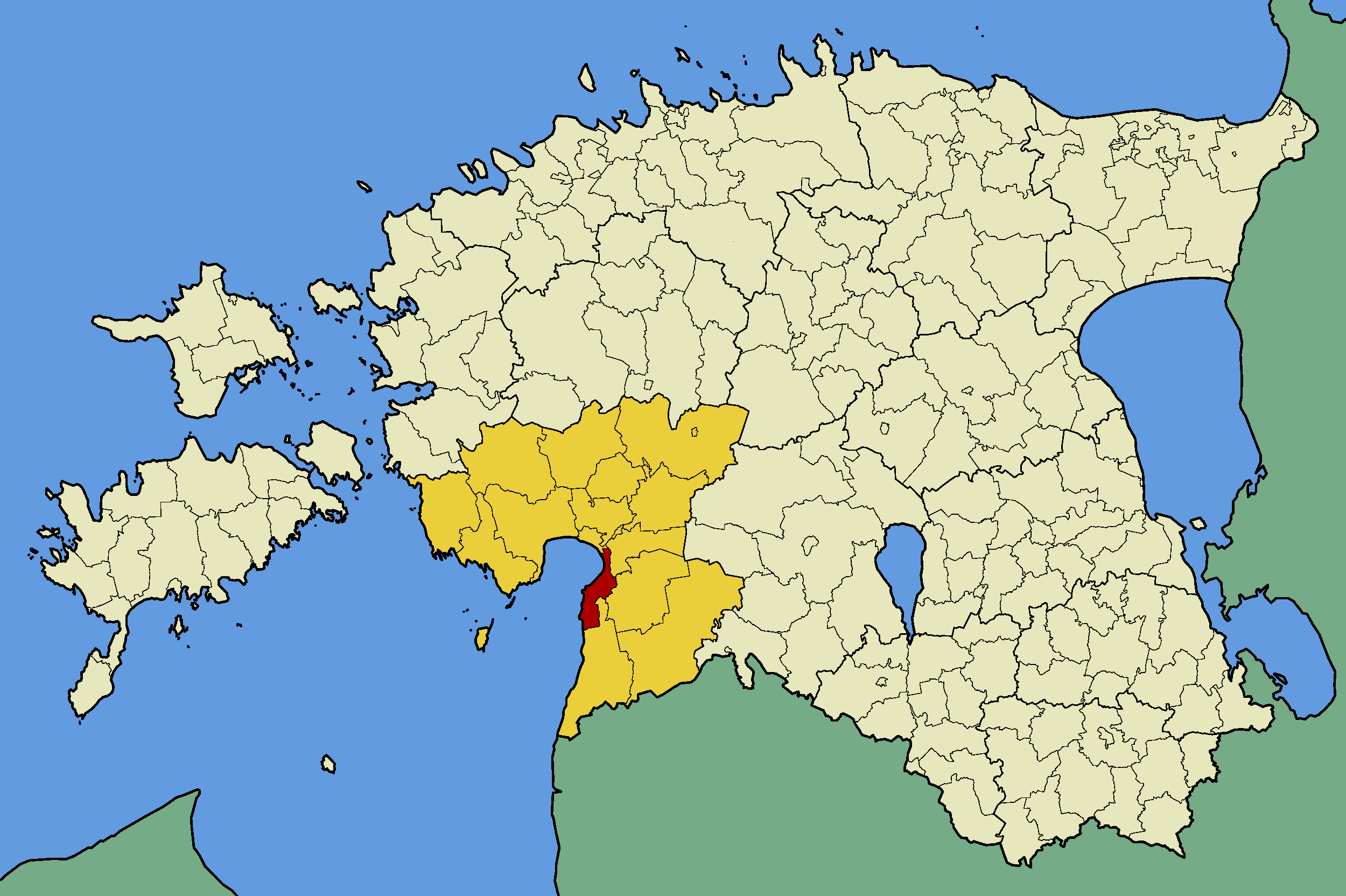
- Tahkuranna Parish within Pärnu County.
- Country: Estonia
- County: Pärnu County
- Administrative centre: Uulu

Area
  - Total: 103.4 km^{2} (39.9 sq mi)

Population (01.01.2006)
  - Total: 2,010
  - Density: 19.4/km^{2} (50.3/sq mi)
- Website: www.tahkuranna.ee

Tahkuranna was a rural municipality in Pärnu County, southwestern Estonia. It existed from 1991 to 2017, while from 1991 to 1995 it bore the name of Uulu Parish (Uulu vald). During the administrative reform (:et) in 2017, Tahkuranna Parish was merged with neighbouring Häädemeeste Parish, the latter keeping its name.

Tahkuranna was home to Lottemaa ("Lotte World"), a theme park in the village of Reiu based on the Lotte from Gadgetville franchise.

== Settlements ==
Small borough

Võiste

Villages

Laadi - Leina - Lepaküla - Mereküla - Metsaküla - Piirumi - Reiu - Tahkuranna - Uulu
