= Karisöödi =

Village in Estonia

- Village
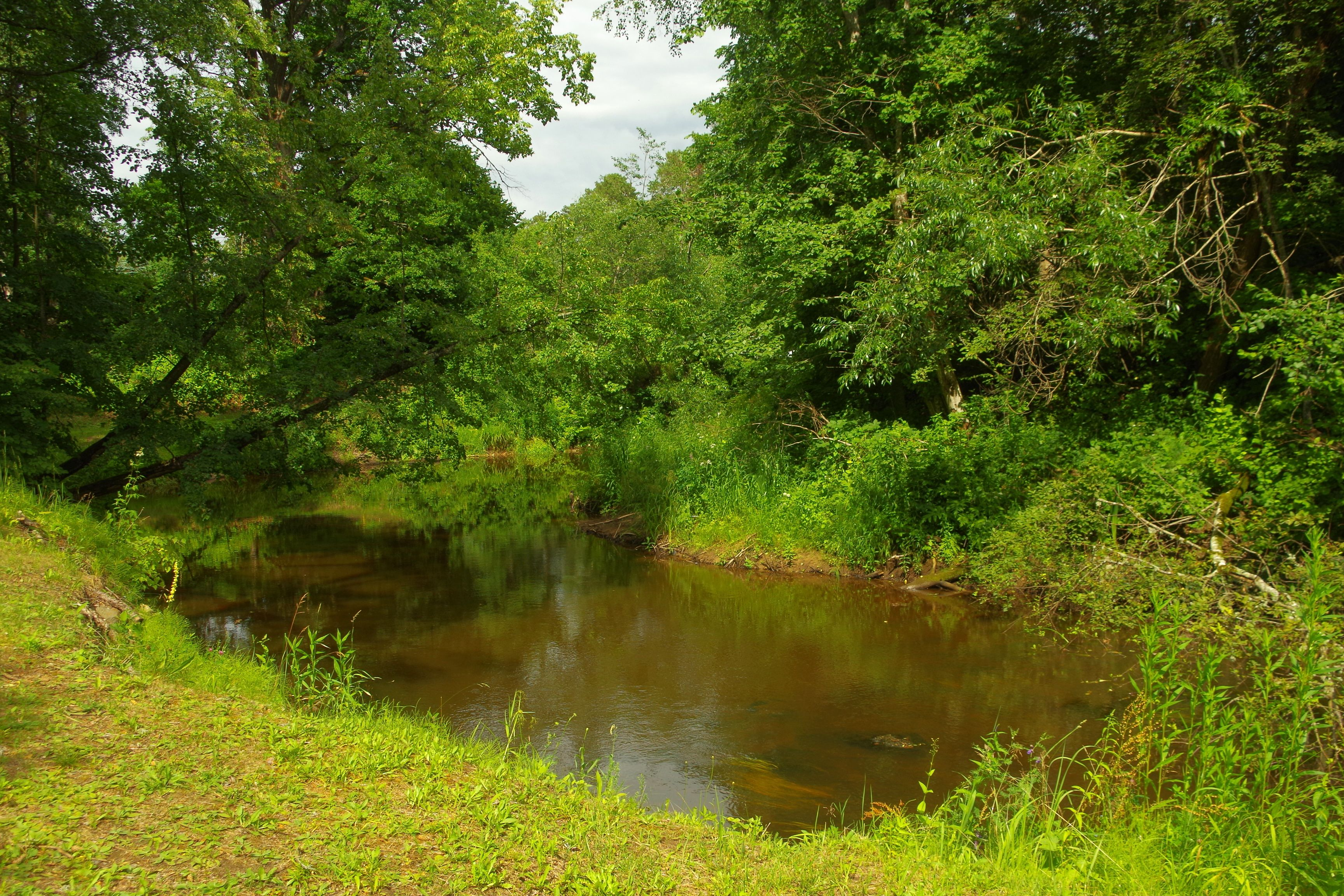
- Peetri River in Karisöödi in the Peetri River Landscape Conservation Area

- Location within Estonia
- Coordinates: 57°33′0″N 26°33′0″E
- Country: Estonia
- County: Võru County
- Municipality: Rõuge Parish
- Time zone: UTC+2 (EET)

Karisöödi (Võro: Karissöödä) is a village in Rõuge Parish, Võru County, Estonia. Between 1991–2017 (until the administrative reform of Estonian municipalities) the village was located in Mõniste Parish. It is the southernmost settlement in Estonia.
