= Murati =

Murati may refer to:

- Murati (village), in Estonia
- Murati Lake, in Estonia
- Murati (surname)

== See also ==
- Muratic acid
