= Laulaste Nature Reserve =

Protected area in Estonia

- Location within Estonia
- Location: Estonia
- Coordinates: 57°58′N 24°32′E
- Area: 1,066 ha (2,630 acres)
- Established: 2006

Laulaste Nature Reserve is a nature reserve which is located in Pärnu County, Estonia.

The area of the nature reserve is 1066 ha.

The protected area was founded in 2005 to protect valuable habitat types and threatened species in Massiaru and Majaka village (both in former Häädemeeste Parish).
