= Lake Kavadi =

Lake in Estonia

- Kavadi järv (Estonian)
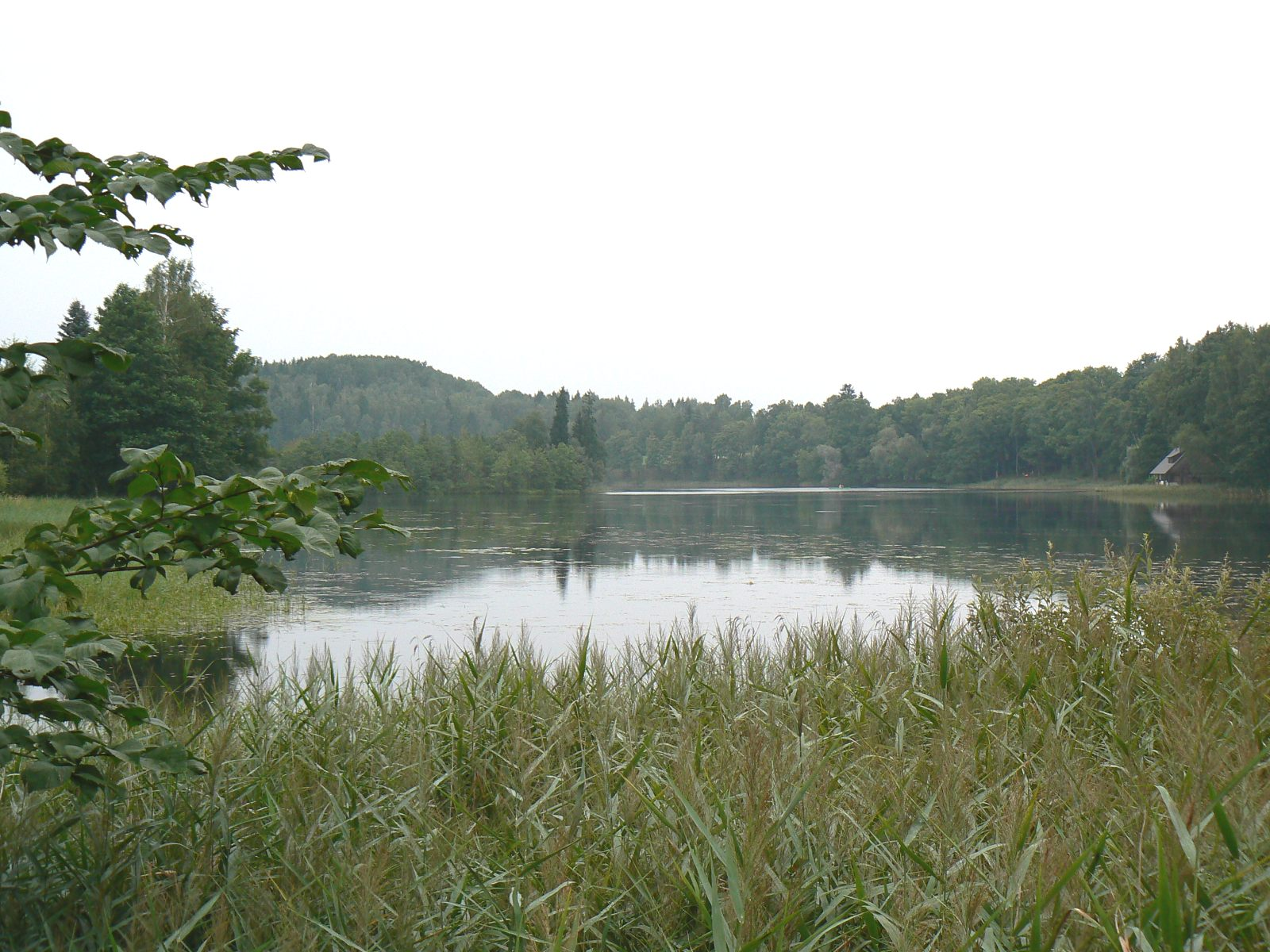

- Location within Estonia
- Location: Uue-Saaluse, Võru County, Estonia
- Coordinates: 57°44′35″N 27°6′20″E
- Primary inflows: Iskna
- Primary outflows: Iskna
- Basin countries: Estonia
- Max. length: 970 meters (3,180 ft)
- Max. width: 440 meters (1,440 ft)
- Surface area: 29.9 hectares (74 acres)
- Average depth: 2.4 meters (7 ft 10 in)
- Max. depth: 8.2 meters (27 ft)
- Water volume: 685,000 cubic meters (24,200,000 cu ft)
- Shore length^{1}: 5,970 meters (19,590 ft)
- Surface elevation: 210.7 meters (691 ft)
- Islands: 3
- ^{1} Shore length is not a well-defined measure.

Lake Kavadi (Estonian: Kavadi järv, also Kavati järv, Uue-Saaluse järv, Mäejärv, or Kavadi Ülajärv) is a lake in Estonia. It is located in the village of Uue-Saaluse in Rõuge Parish, Võru County.

== Physical description ==
The lake has an area of 29.9 hectares (74 acres), and it has three islands with a combined area of 1.3 hectares (3.2 acres). The lake has an average depth of 2.4 meters (7 ft 10 in) and a maximum depth of 8.2 meters (27 ft). It is 970 meters (3,180 ft) long, and its shoreline measures 5,970 meters (19,590 ft). It has a volume of 685,000 cubic meters (24,200,000 cu ft).

== Gallery ==
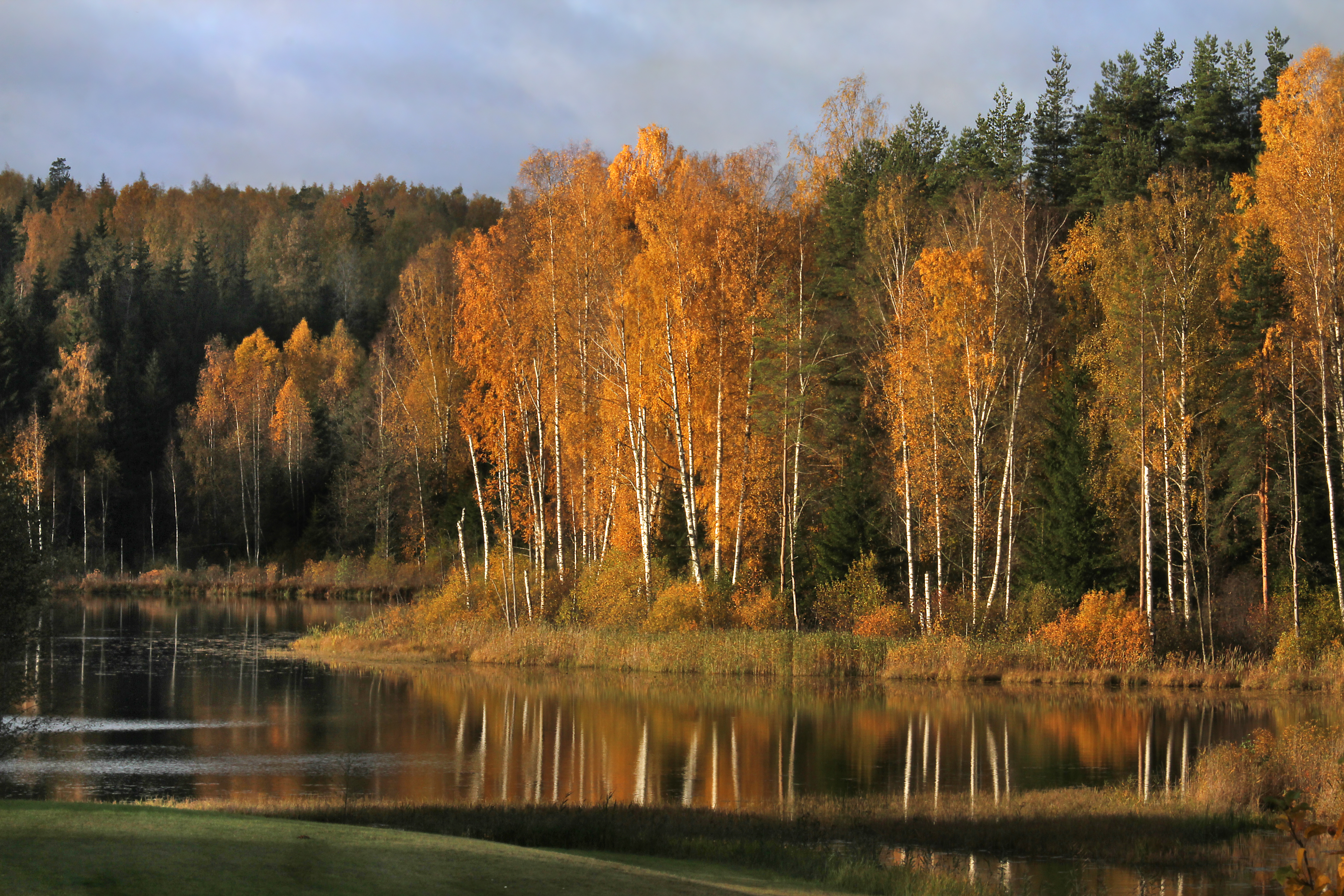
Lake Kavadi

== See also ==
- List of lakes of Estonia
