= Reiu =

Village in Estonia

- Village
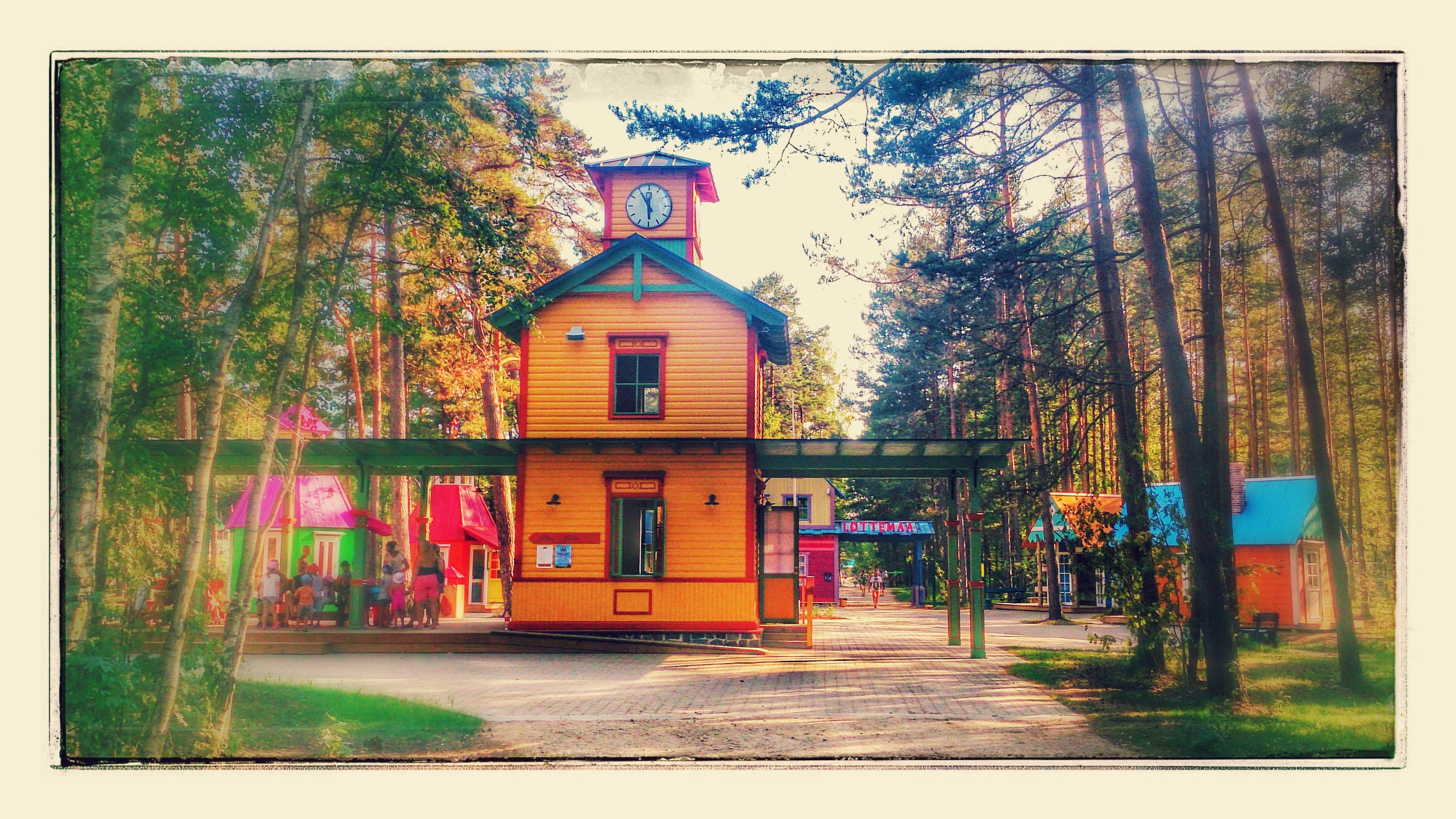
- Entrance to Lottemaa

- Location in Estonia
- Coordinates: 58°18′28″N 24°36′43″E
- Country: Estonia
- County: Pärnu County
- Municipality: Häädemeeste Parish

Population (2011 Census)
  - Total: 599

Reiu is a village in Häädemeeste Parish, Pärnu County in southwestern Estonia. It is located just south of the city of Pärnu (about 10 km (6 mi) from the city centre), between Pärnu Bay and the Reiu River. As of the 2011 census, the settlement's population was 599.

The village is passed by the National road 4 (part of E67 or the Via Baltica), and is the starting point of the National road 6 (Valga–Uulu highway).

Reiu is the location of Lottemaa, a theme park inspired by the Lotte from Gadgetville. In Soviet times, the site was home to the Kullipesa missile base.

In 2015, a new golf course (Pärnu Bay Golf Links), was opened in Reiu.

The Raeküla Forest is located in the northern part of the village's territory.

On 7 September 2015, the village of Mereküla was established by separating land from Reiu.
