= Selja River Landscape Conservation Area =

Protected area in Estonia

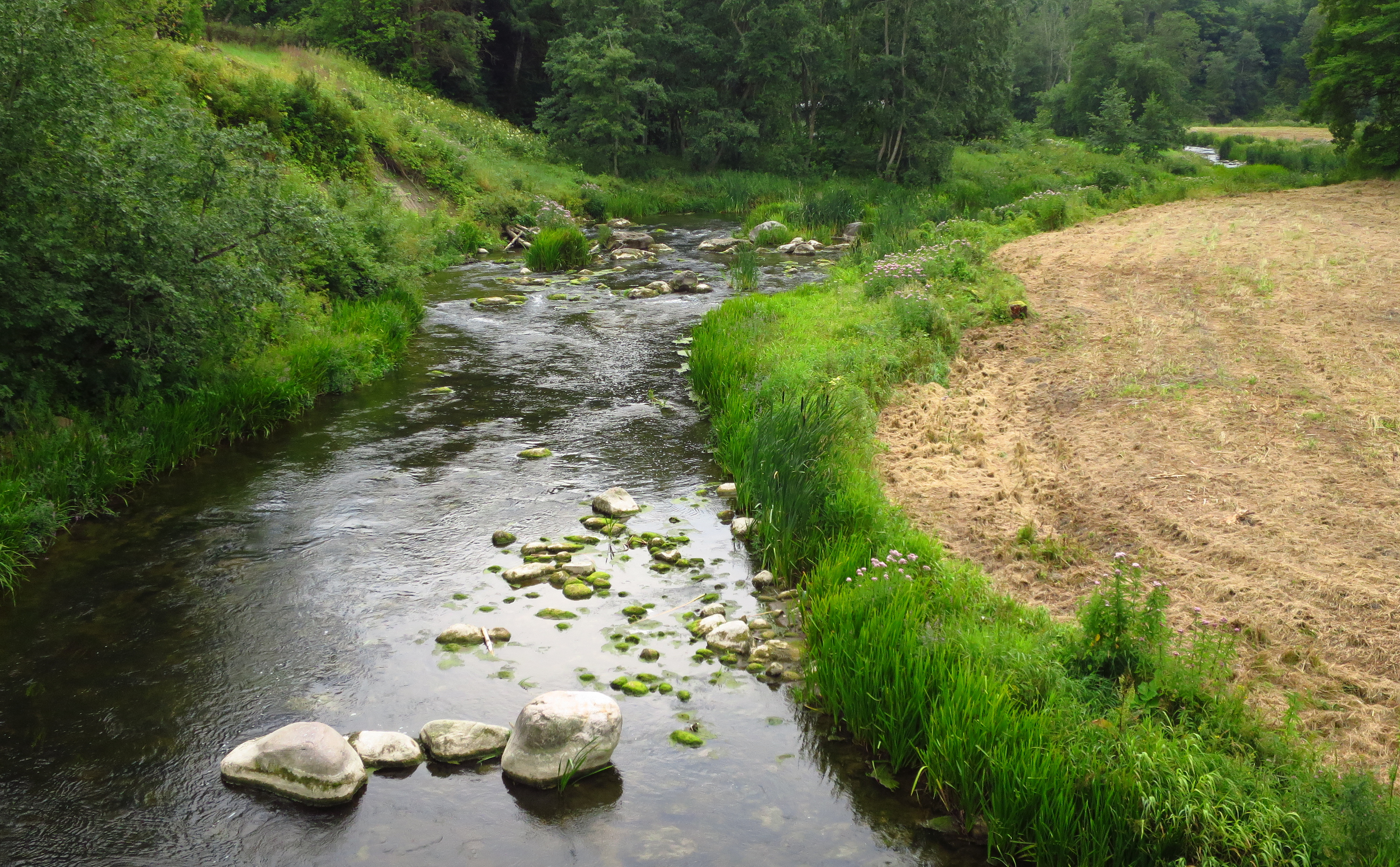

- Location within Estonia
- Location: Estonia
- Coordinates: 59°30′N 26°20′E
- Area: 643 ha (1,590 acres)
- Established: 1978 (2005)

Selja River Landscape Conservation Area is a nature park which is located in Lääne-Viru County, Estonia.

The area of the nature park is 643 ha.

The protected area was founded in 1978 to protect Selja River Ancient Valley and Karepa-Rutja coastal formations (Estonian: rannamoodustised) and its surrounding areas.
