= Massu =

Massu may refer to:

- Jacques Massu (1908–2002), French general, who fought during World War II, First Indochina War and Algerian War
- Nicolás Massú (born 1979), Chilean Olympic champion tennis player
- Massu, Lääneranna Parish, village in Lääneranna Parish, Pärnu County, Estonia
- Massu, Põhja-Pärnumaa Parish, village in Põhja-Pärnumaa Parish, Pärnu County, Estonia
- Massu River, Estonia
