= Vaidava (river) =

River in Estonia and Latvia

Vaidava River
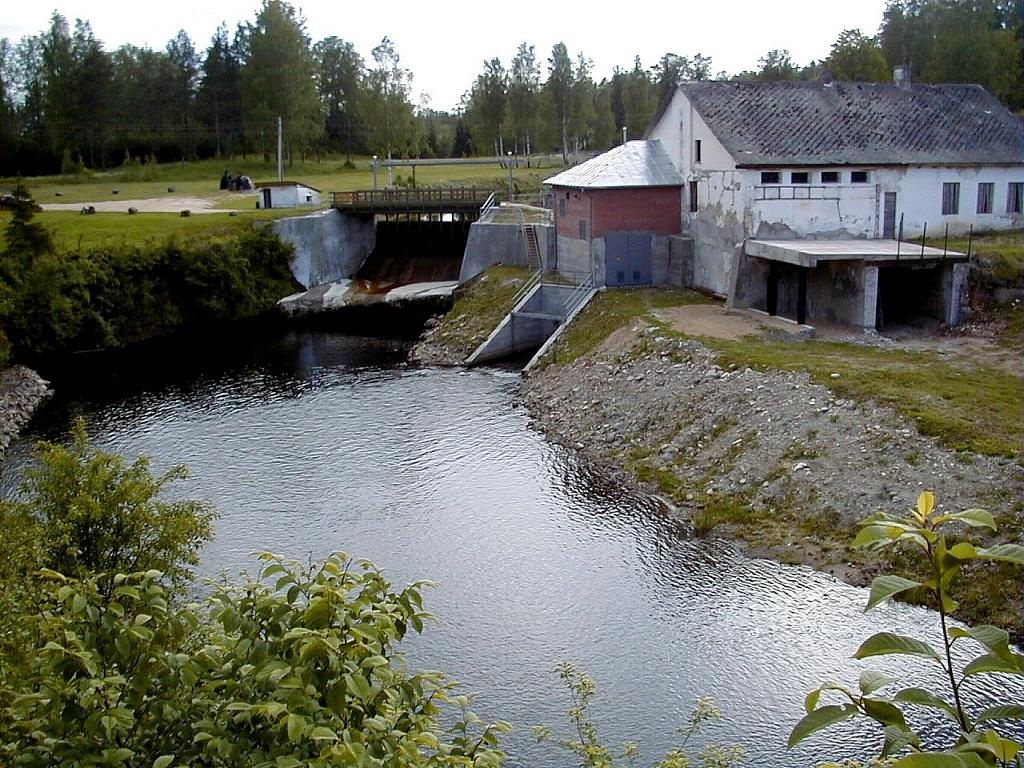

Location
- Countries: Estonia; Latvia

Physical characteristics
- Mouth: Mustjõgi
  - coordinates: 57°36′22″N 26°34′02″E
- Length: 72 km (45 mi)

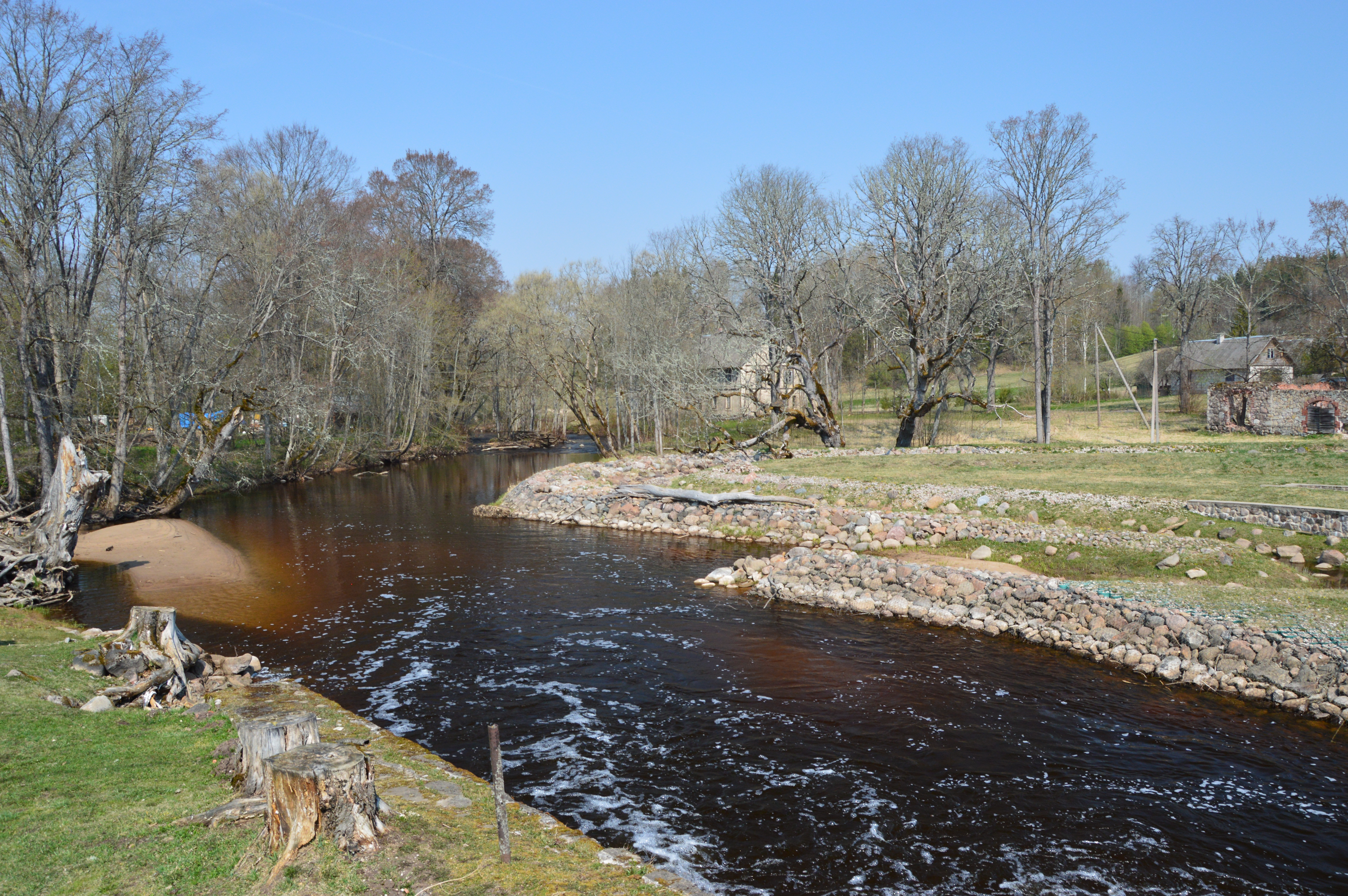
Vaidava River

The Vaidava River is a river in the Estonia–Latvia border area. The river is 72 km long (of which 61 km is in Latvia). The river starts from Lake Murati as that lake's primary outflow and flows into the Mustjõgi.
