= Võidu =

Village in Estonia

Coordinates: 58°09′N 24°35′E

- Village
- Interactive map of Võidu
- Country: Estonia
- County: Pärnu County
- Parish: Häädemeeste Parish
- Time zone: UTC+2 (EET)
  - Summer (DST): UTC+3 (EEST)

Võidu is a village in Häädemeeste Parish, Pärnu County in southwestern Estonia.
