= Metsapoole (village) =

Village in Estonia

Coordinates: 57°53′59″N 24°22′30″E

Metsapoole village
- Village
- Interactive map of Metsapoole village
- Country: Estonia
- County: Pärnu County
- Parish: Häädemeeste Parish
- Time zone: UTC+2 (EET)
  - Summer (DST): UTC+3 (EEST)

Metsapoole is a village in Häädemeeste Parish, Pärnu County in southwestern Estonia.
