= Krundiküla =

Village in Estonia

Coordinates: 58°02′52″N 24°28′49″E

- Village
- Interactive map of Krundiküla
- Country: Estonia
- County: Pärnu County
- Parish: Häädemeeste Parish
- Time zone: UTC+2 (EET)
  - Summer (DST): UTC+3 (EEST)

Krundiküla is a village in Häädemeeste Parish, Pärnu County in southwestern Estonia.
