= Piirumi =

Village in Estonia

Coordinates: 58°09′N 24°29′E

- Village
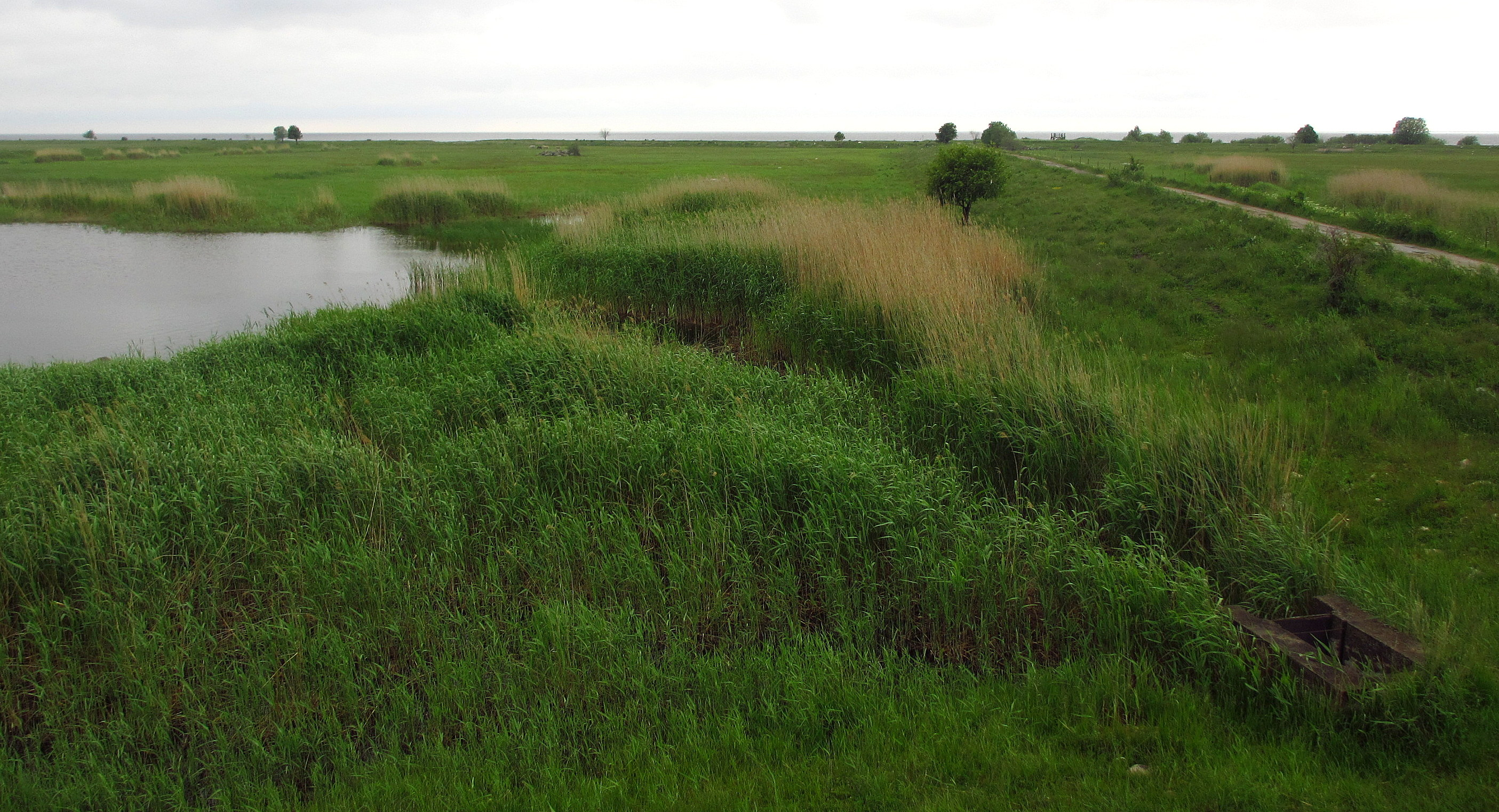
- Pikla coastal meadow near Piirumi village.
- Interactive map of Piirumi
- Country: Estonia
- County: Pärnu County
- Parish: Häädemeeste Parish
- Time zone: UTC+2 (EET)
  - Summer (DST): UTC+3 (EEST)

Piirumi is a village in Häädemeeste Parish, Pärnu County in southwestern Estonia. Piirumi has a population of 56.
