= Käru (river) =

River in Estonia

Käru River
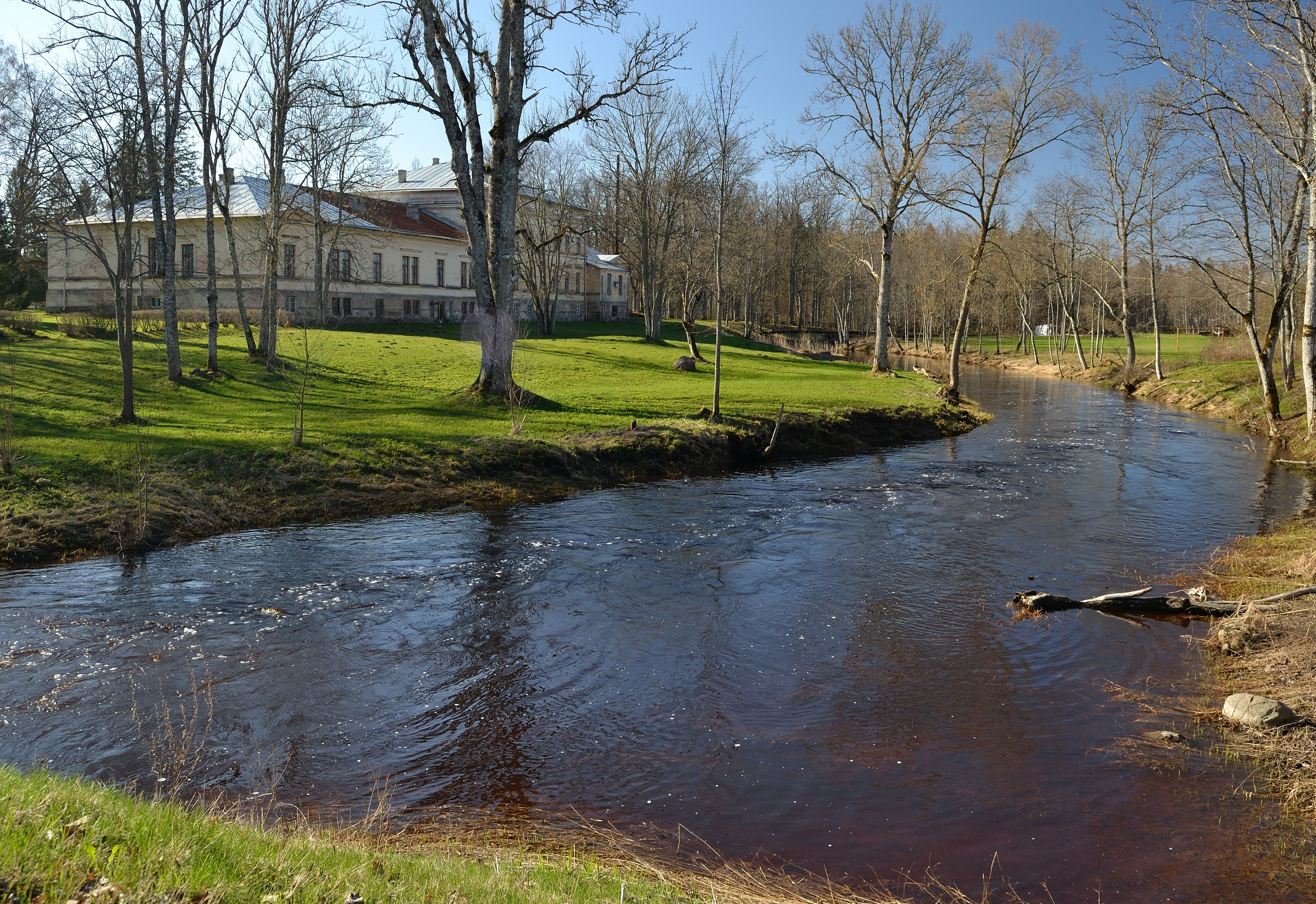

Location
- Country: Estonia

Physical characteristics
- Mouth: Pärnu River
  - location: Suurejõe
  - coordinates: 58°37′02″N 25°06′17″E
- Length: 72.4 km
- Basin size: 315.5 km²

The Käru River is a river in Järva and Rapla counties, Estonia. The river is 72.4 km long and basin size is 315.5 km^{2}. It runs from Aeli Lake into the Pärnu River.
