= Peetri River Landscape Conservation Area =

Protected area in Estonia

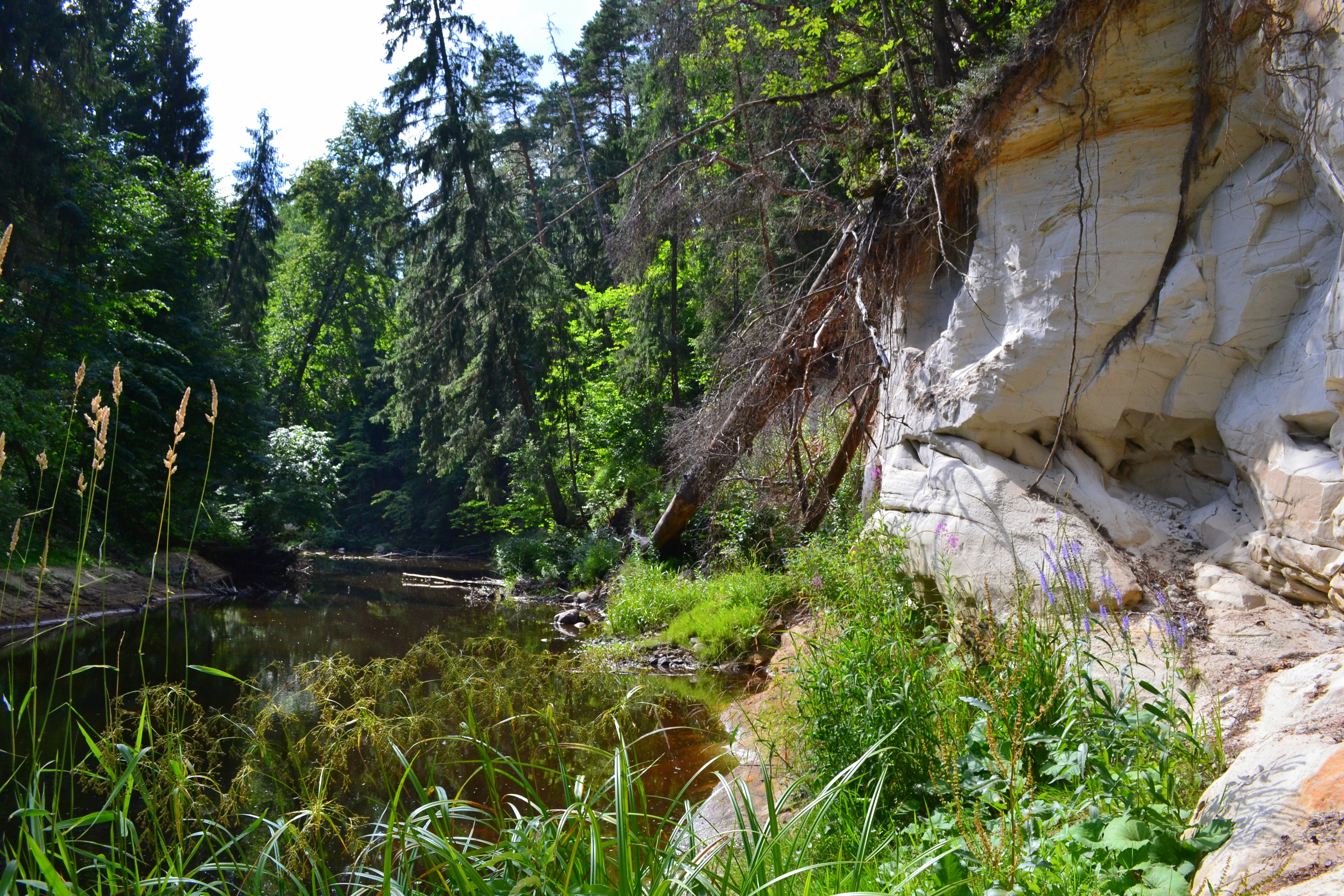

- Location within Estonia
- Location: Estonia
- Coordinates: 57°33′N 26°32′E
- Area: 500 ha (1,200 acres)
- Established: 1959 (2005)

Peetri River Landscape Conservation Area is a nature park which is located in Võru County, Estonia.

The area of the nature park is 500 ha.

The protected area was founded in 1959 to protect the bed and banks of Peetri River. In 2005, the protected area was designated to the landscape conservation area.
