= Lake Murati =

Lake in Estonia

- Murati järv (Estonian); Murata ezers (Latvian)
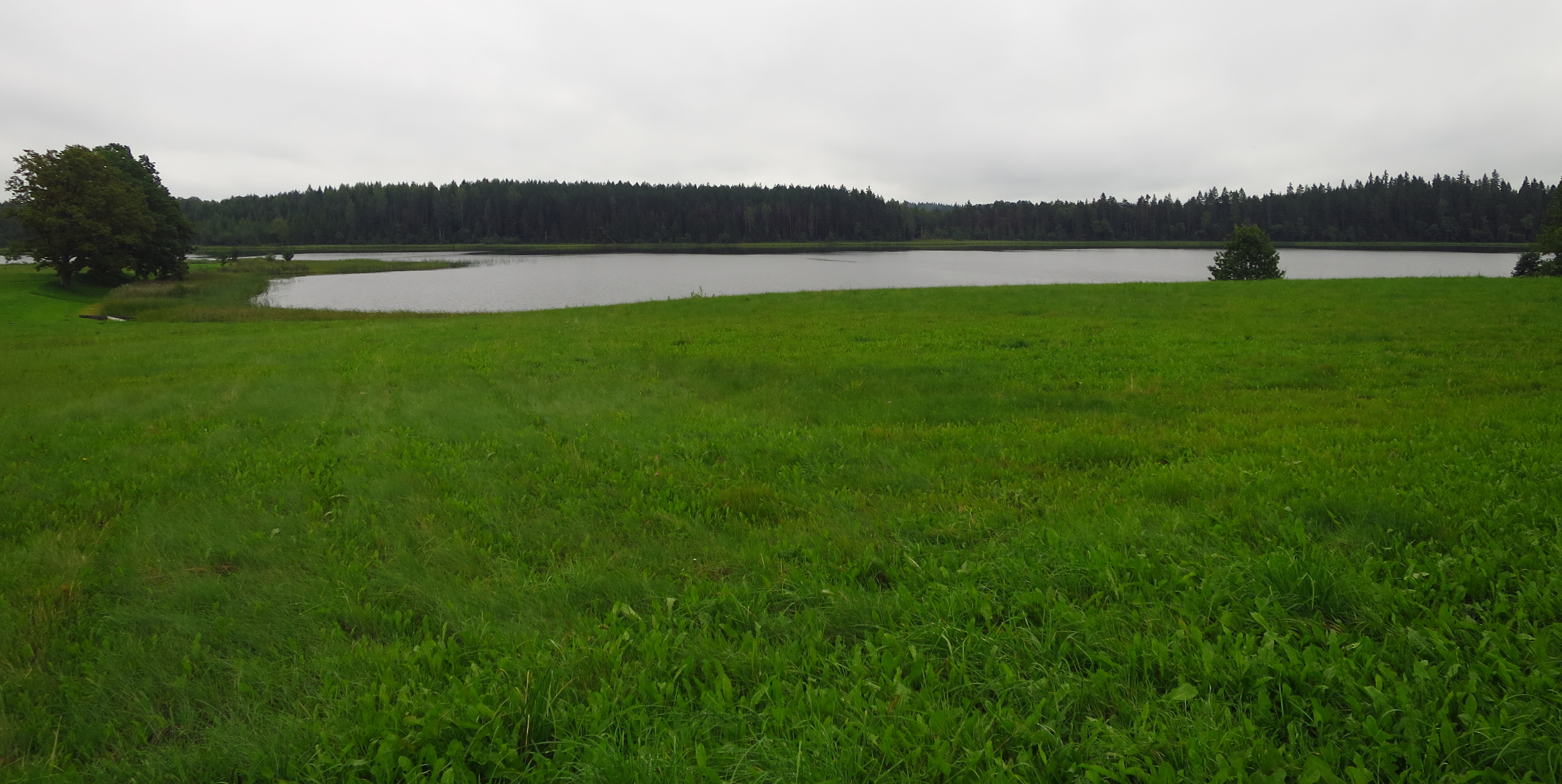

- Location within Estonia
- Coordinates: 57°35′0″N 27°5′30″E
- Primary inflows: Kuura
- Primary outflows: Vaidava
- Basin countries: Estonia, Latvia
- Max. length: 1,880 meters (6,170 ft)
- Max. width: 700 meters (2,300 ft)
- Surface area: 65.8 hectares (163 acres)
- Average depth: 2.1 meters (6 ft 11 in)
- Max. depth: 3.1 meters (10 ft)
- Water volume: 1,378,000 cubic meters (48,700,000 cu ft)
- Shore length^{1}: 5,290 meters (17,360 ft)
- Surface elevation: 171.9 meters (564 ft)
- ^{1} Shore length is not a well-defined measure.

Lake Murati (Estonian: Murati järv, Latvian: Murata ezers or Murats) is a lake in Estonia and Latvia. Most of the lake is located in the Estonian village of Murati in Rõuge Parish, Võru County, and a small part is located in Latvia's Ziemeri Parish in Alūksne Municipality, in the Veclaicene protected landscape area.

== Physical description ==
The lake has an area of 65.8 hectares (163 acres), of which 11.2 are in Latvia. The lake has an average depth of 2.1 meters (6 ft 11 in) and a maximum depth of 3.1 meters (10 ft). It is 1,880 meters (6,170 ft) long, and its shoreline measures 5,290 meters (17,360 ft). It has a volume of 1,378,000 cubic meters (48,700,000 cu ft).

The shores are low and gently sloping, and the bottom is muddy. It is fed by the Kuura River and Allumäe Creek (in Estonia), and it is drained by the Vaidava River. Vegetation includes sedges, rushes, reeds, dock, gladioli, elodea, and water lilies. Fish include ling, pike, perch, roach, and bream.

== See also ==
- List of lakes of Estonia
