= Toolse Nature Reserve =

Nature reserve in Estonia

- Location within Estonia
- Location: Estonia
- Coordinates: 59°31′N 26°29′E
- Area: 468 ha (1,160 acres)
- Established: 1978 (2005)

Toolse Nature Reserve is a nature reserve which is located in Lääne-Viru County, Estonia.

The area of the nature reserve is 468 ha.

The protected area was founded in 1978 to protect Toolse Park and its oak forest. In 2005 the protected area was designated to the nature reserve.
