= Laadi =

Village in Estonia

Coordinates: 58°16′N 24°37′E

- Village
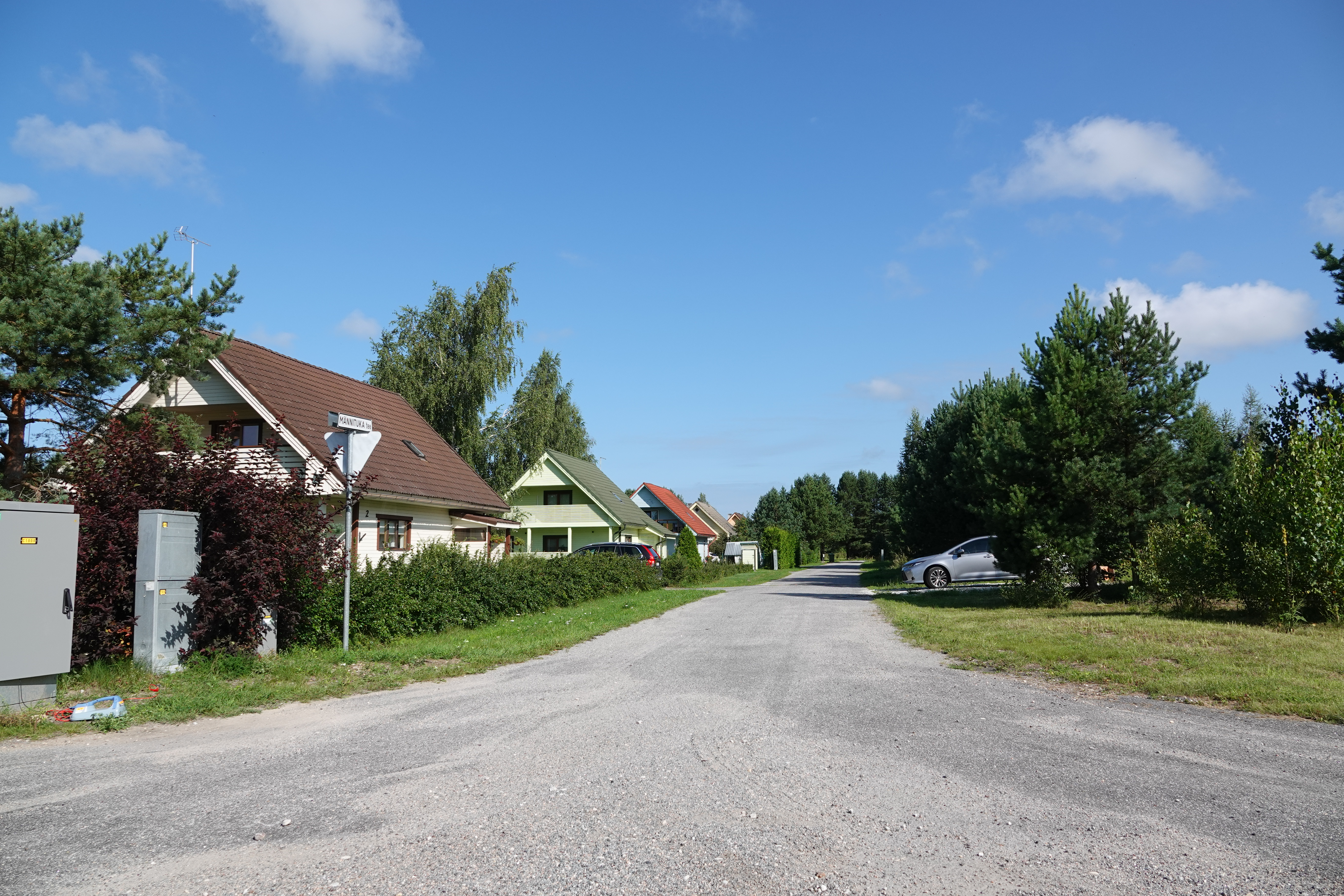
- Laadi village street
- Interactive map of Laadi
- Country: Estonia
- County: Pärnu County
- Parish: Häädemeeste Parish
- Time zone: UTC+2 (EET)
  - Summer (DST): UTC+3 (EEST)

Laadi is a village in Häädemeeste Parish, Pärnu County, in southwestern Estonia.
