= Majaka =

Village in Estonia

- Village
- Location within Estonia
- Coordinates: 57°59′N 24°25′E
- Country: Estonia
- County: Pärnu County
- Parish: Häädemeeste Parish
- Time zone: UTC+2 (EET)
  - Summer (DST): UTC+3 (EEST)

Majaka is a village in Häädemeeste Parish, Pärnu County in southwestern Estonia.
