= Alajõgi =

River in Estonia

Coordinates: 59°0′26.31″N 27°26′2.24″E

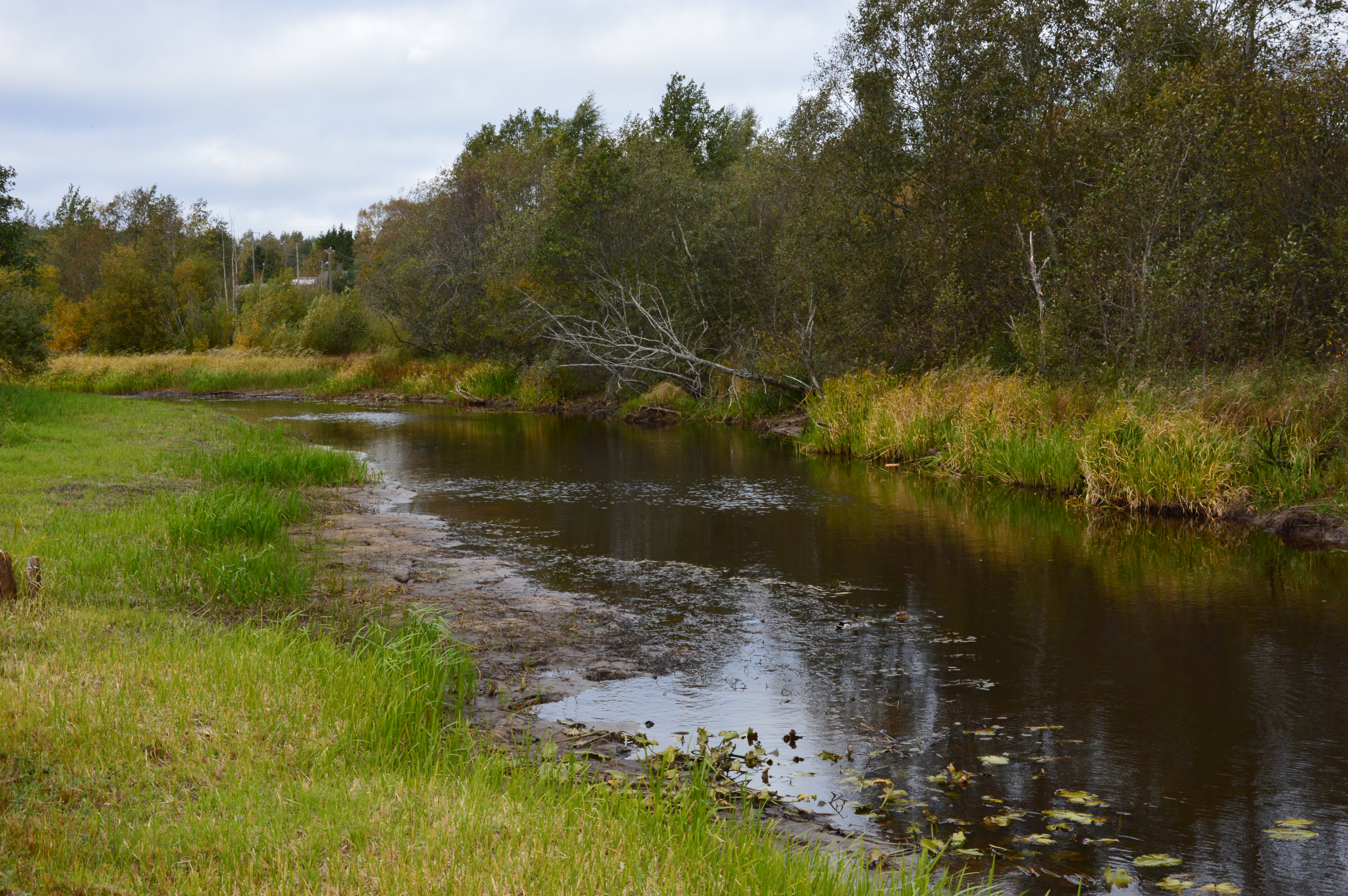
- The Alajõgi in the village of Alajõe

Location
- Country: Estonia

Physical characteristics
- Source
  - location: Kõnnu Pikkjärv
- Mouth
  - location: Lake Peipus
- Length: 29 km (18 mi)
- Basin size: 150 km^{2} (58 sq mi)

The Alajõgi is a river in Estonia. The river is 29 km long with a river basin size of 150 square kilometres. The river begins at Kõnnu Pikkjärv, near the village of Ongassaare.
