= Massu (river) =

River in Estonia

Massu River

Location
- Country: Estonia

Physical characteristics
- Mouth: Vändra River
  - coordinates: 58°36′46″N 24°58′41″E
- Length: 37.5 km (23.3 mi)
- Basin size: 78.2 km^{2} (30.2 sq mi)

The Massu River is a river in Pärnu and Rapla counties, Estonia. The river is 37.5 km long, and its basin size is 78.2 km^{2}. It discharges into the Vändra River.
