= Toolse (river) =

River in Estonia

Toolse River
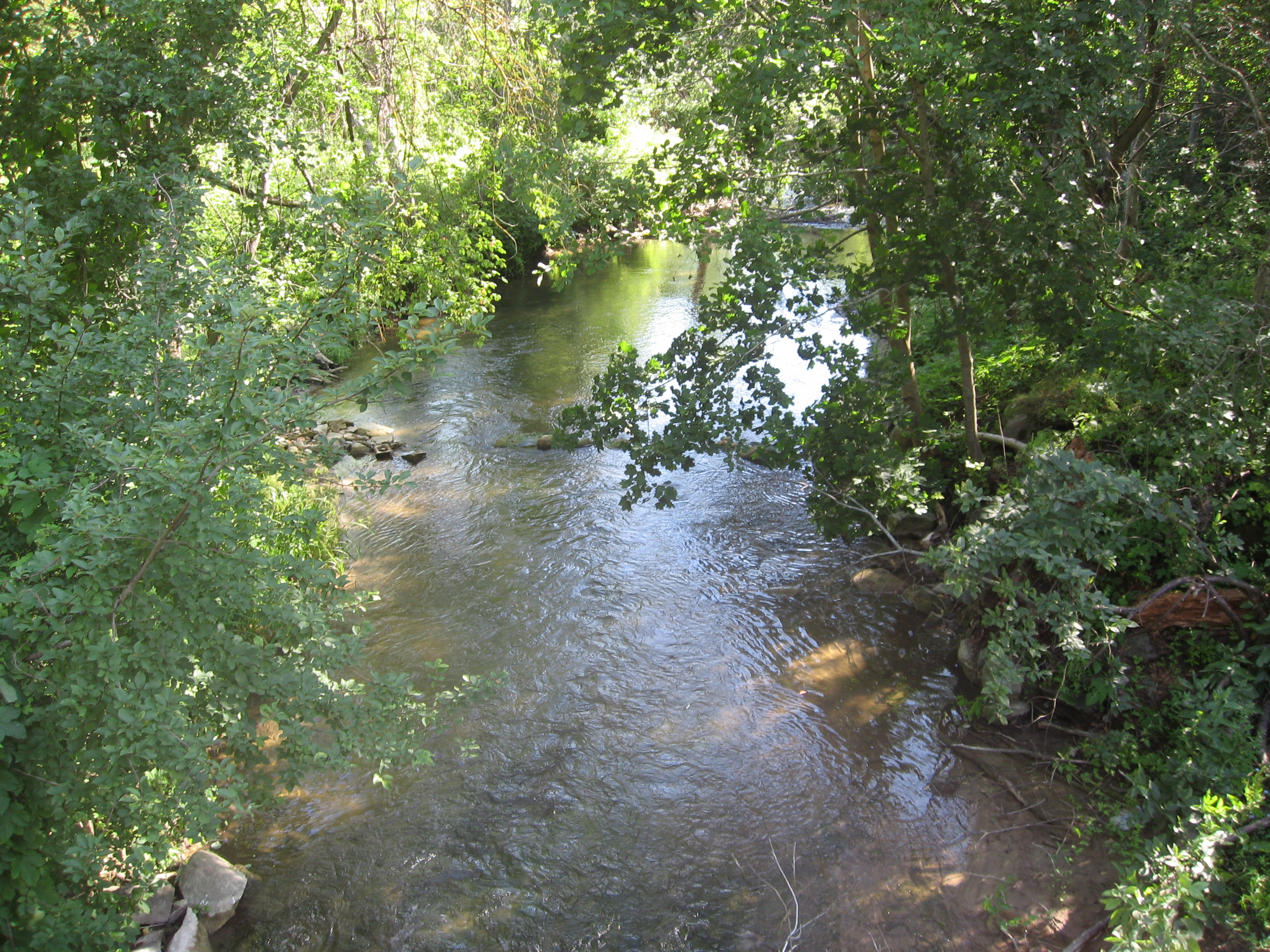

Location
- Country: Estonia

Physical characteristics
- Mouth: Gulf of Finland
  - coordinates: 59°31′43″N 26°28′28″E
- Length: 25.2 km (15.7 mi)
- Basin size: 84.3 km^{2} (32.5 sq mi)

The Toolse River is a river in Lääne-Viru County, Estonia. The river is 25.2 km long, and its basin size is 84.3 km^{2}. It discharges into the Gulf of Finland.

Trout and grayling live in the river.
