= Velise (river) =

River in Estonia

Velise River
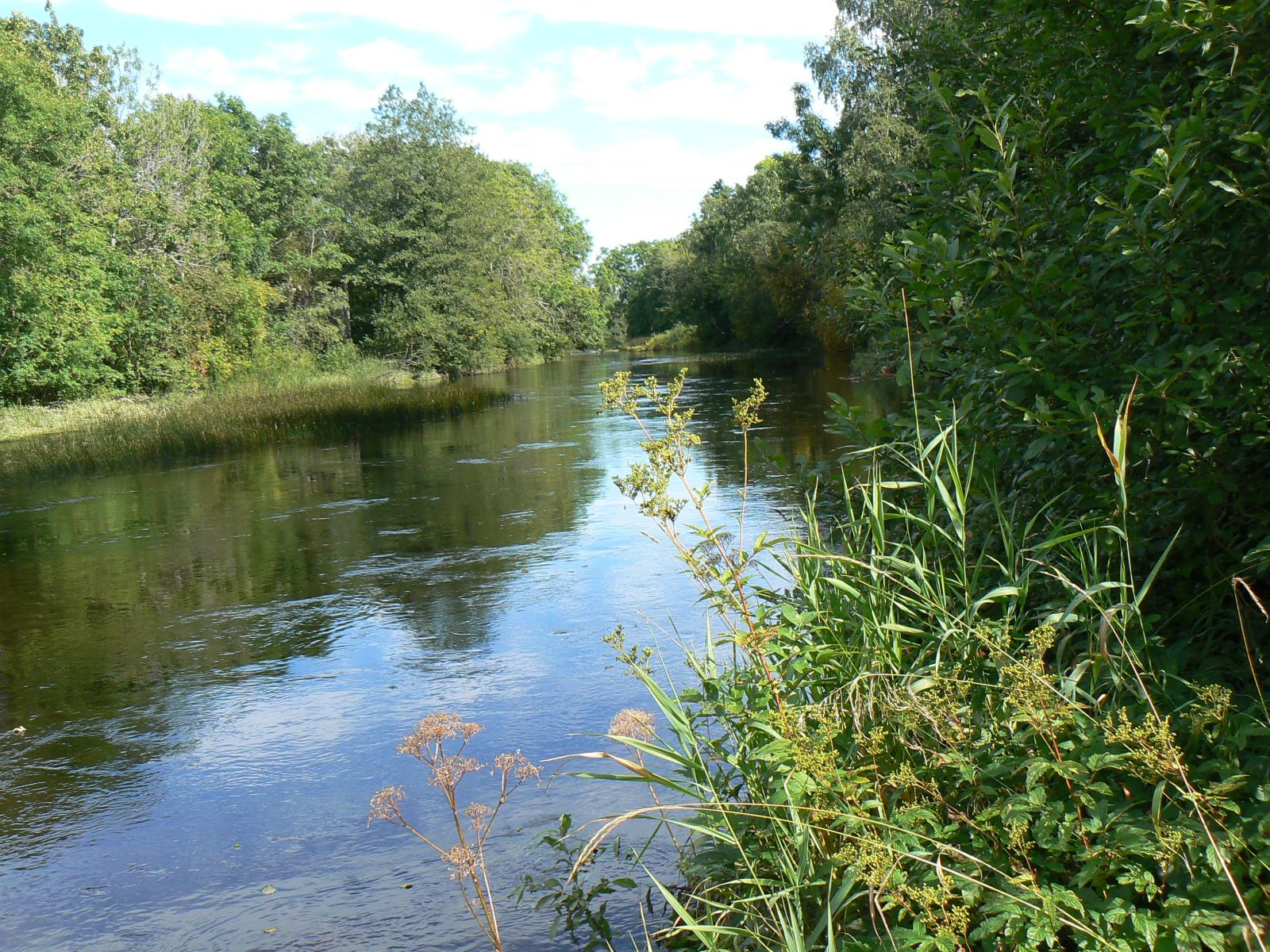

Location
- Country: Estonia

Physical characteristics
- Mouth: Vigala River
  - coordinates: 58°44′08″N 24°09′18″E
- Length: 82.9 km (51.5 mi)
- Basin size: 867.8 km^{2} (335.1 sq mi)

Velise River is a river in Pärnu and Rapla County, Estonia. The river is 82.9 km long and basin size is 867.8 km^{2}. It runs into Vigala River.
