= Murati (village) =

Village in Estonia

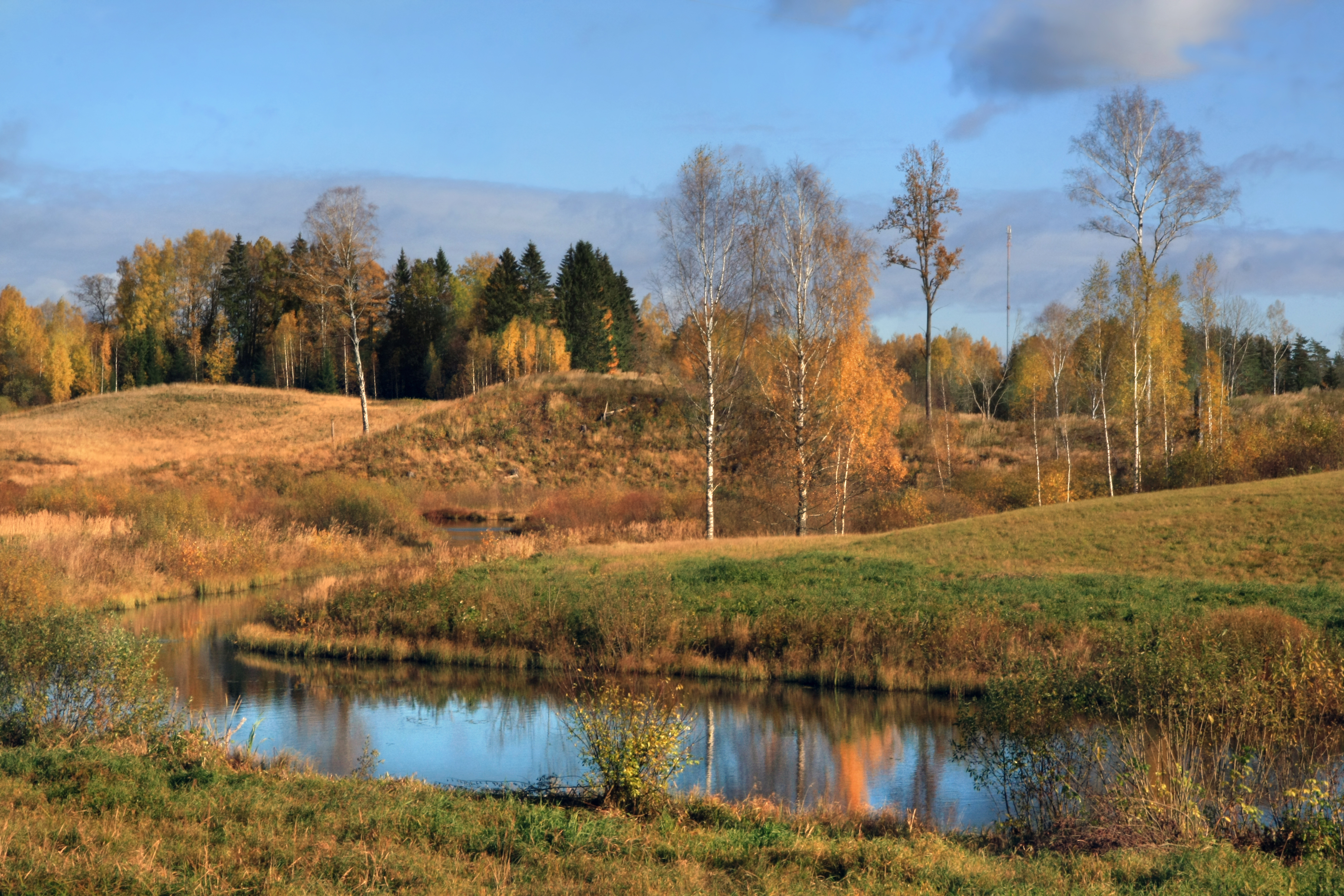

- Location within Estonia
- Coordinates: 57°35′0″N 27°3′0″E
- Country: Estonia
- County: Võru County
- Municipality: Rõuge Parish
- Time zone: UTC+2 (EET)

Murati is a village in Rõuge Parish, Võru County in southeastern Estonia. Between 1991 and 2017 (until the administrative reform of Estonian municipalities) the village was located in Haanja Parish.

== See also ==
- Lake Murati
