= Lõve (river) =

River on Saaremaa island, Estonia

Lõve River
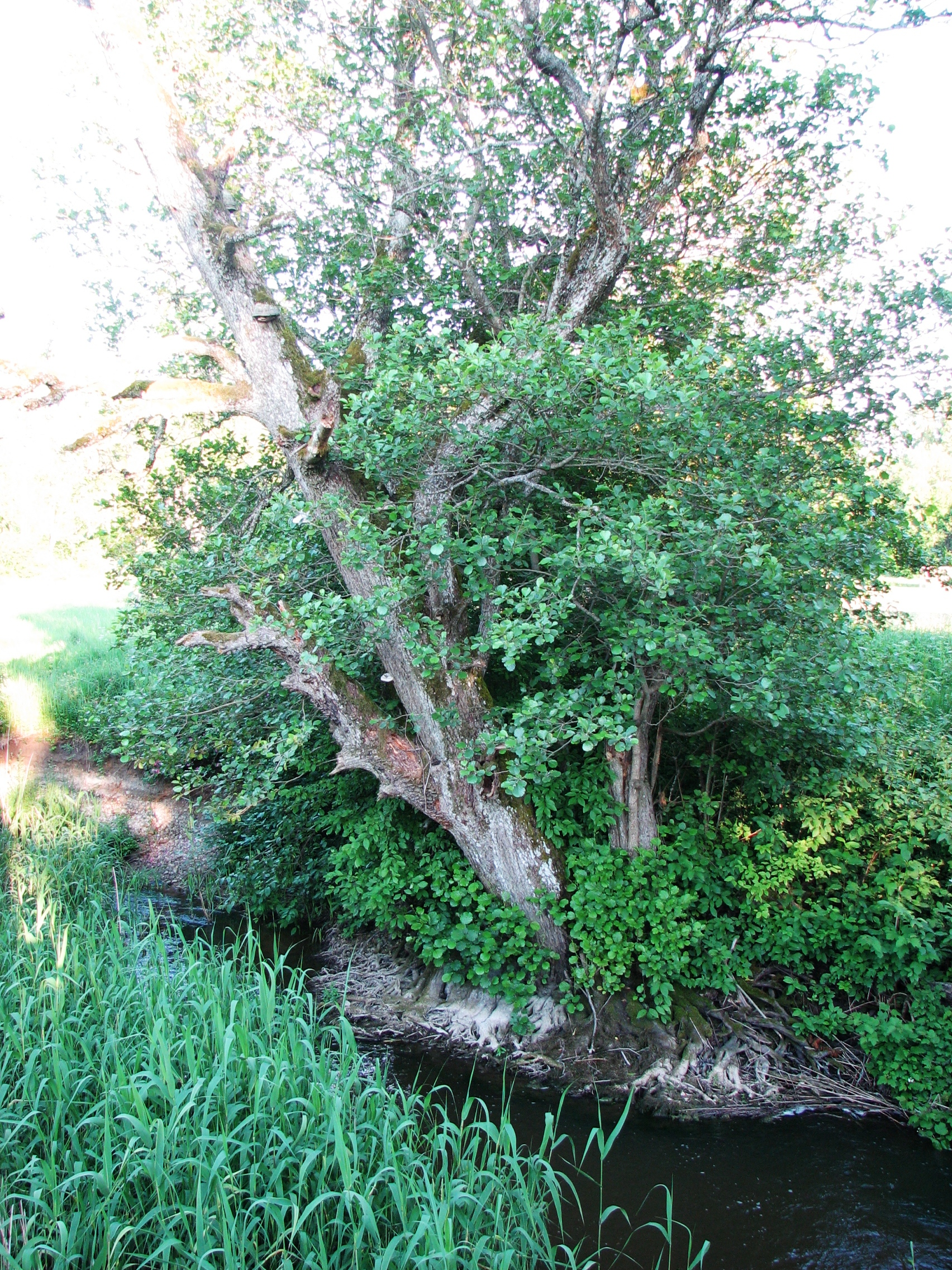

Location
- Country: Estonia

Physical characteristics
- Mouth: Oessaare Bay
  - coordinates: 58°20′05″N 22°51′30″E
- Length: 32 km
- Basin size: 160.2 km²

The Lõve River is a river in Saare County, Estonia. The river is 32 km long, and its basin size is 160.2 km^{2}. It discharges into Oessaare Bay.
