= Umbusi (river) =

River in Estonia

Umbusi River
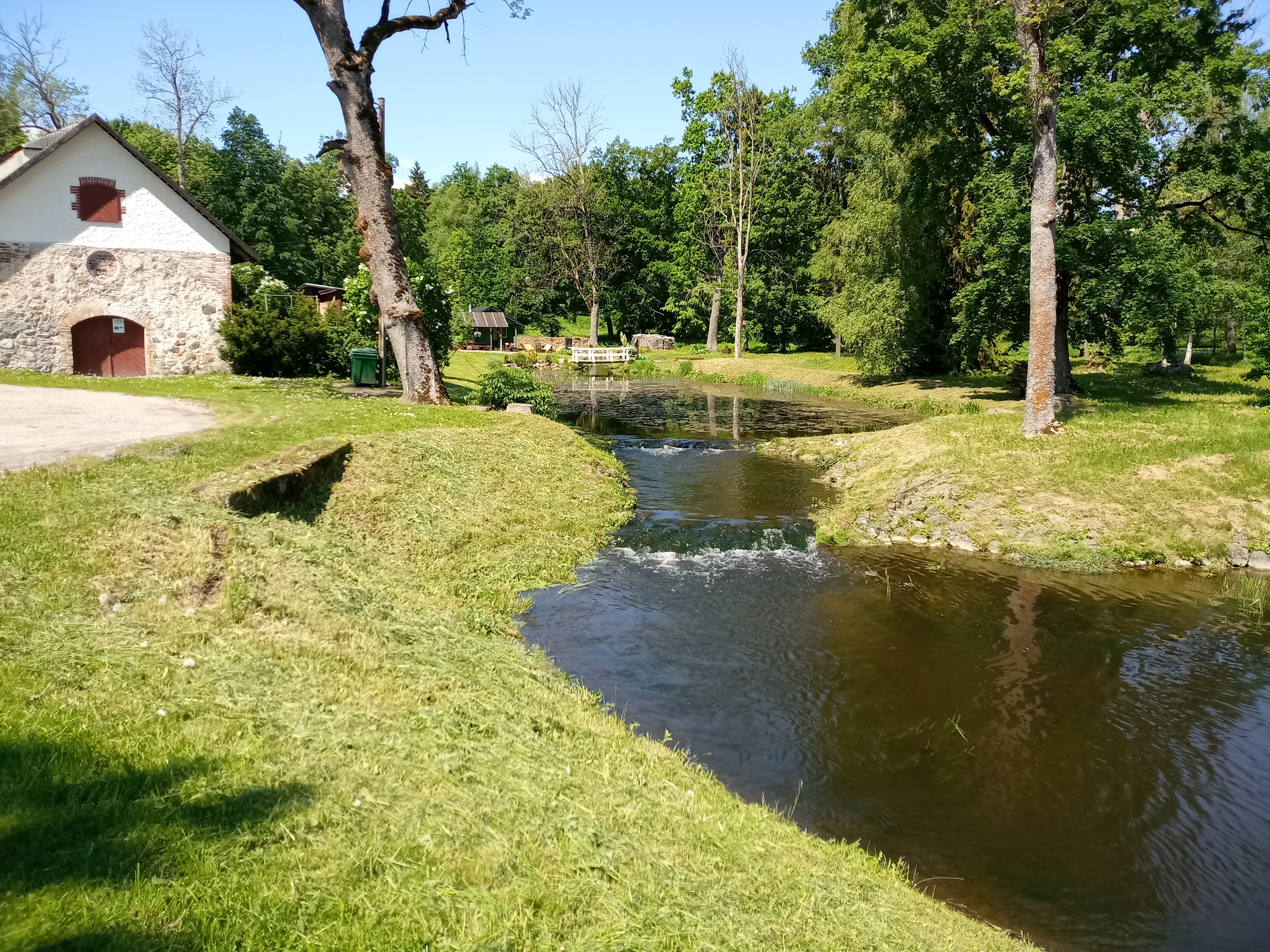

Location
- Country: Estonia

Physical characteristics
- Mouth: Pedja River
  - coordinates: 58°31′29″N 26°09′57″E
- Length: 45.5 km (28.3 mi)
- Basin size: 159.2 km^{2} (61.5 sq mi)

The Umbusi River is a river in Jõgeva County, Estonia. The river is 45.5 km long, and its basin size is 159.2 km^{2}. It discharges into the Pedja River.

Trout and grayling live in the river.
