= Suurejõe =

Village in Estonia

- Village
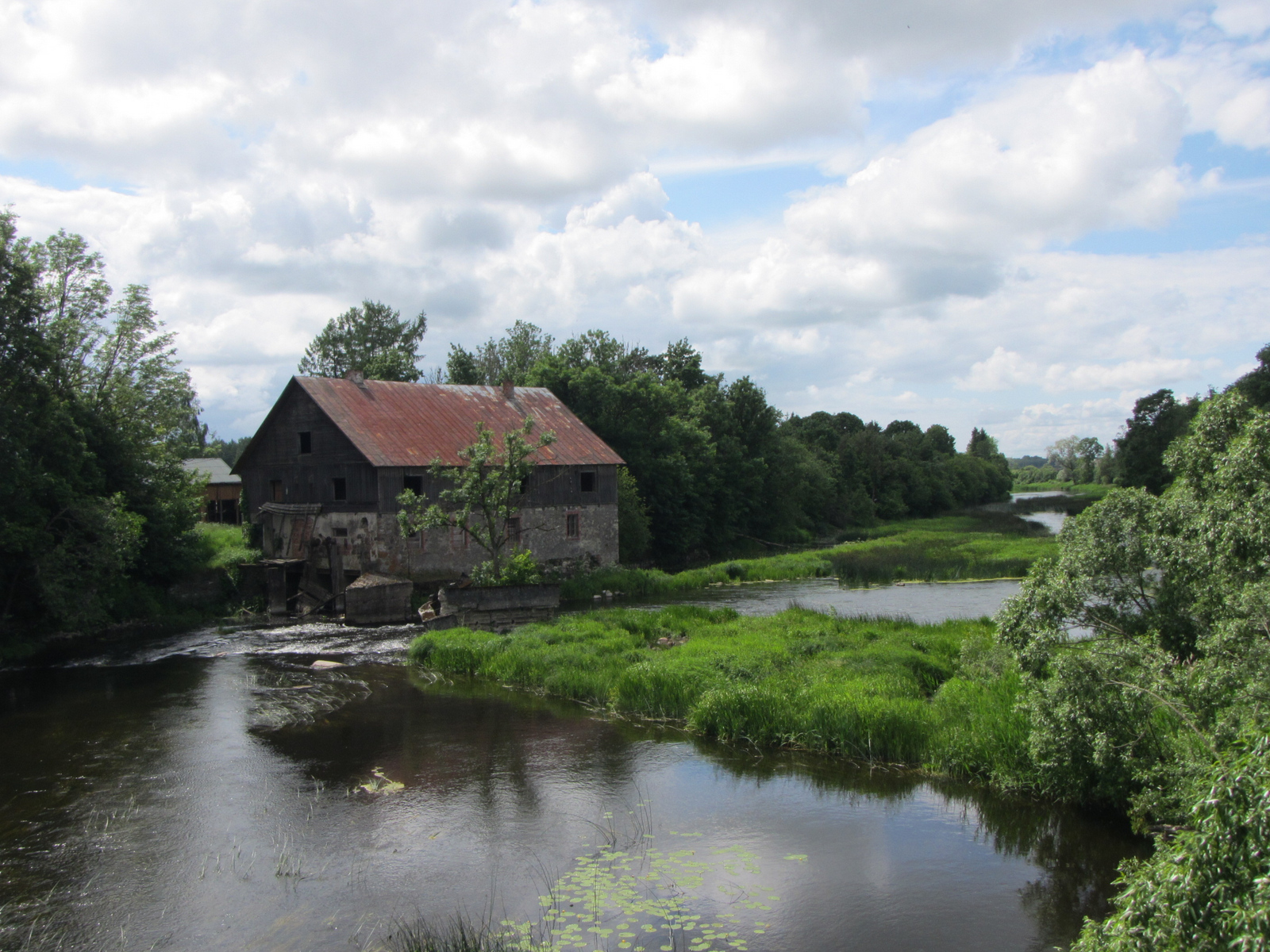
- Suurejõe watermill on the Pärnu River
- Interactive map of Suurejõe
- Coordinates: 58°37′05″N 25°06′12″E
- Country: Estonia
- County: Pärnu County
- Parish: Põhja-Pärnumaa Parish
- Time zone: UTC+2 (EET)
  - Summer (DST): UTC+3 (EEST)

Suurejõe is a village in Põhja-Pärnumaa Parish, Pärnu County in western-central Estonia. Prior to the 2017 administrative reform of Estonian local governments, the village was in Vändra Parish.

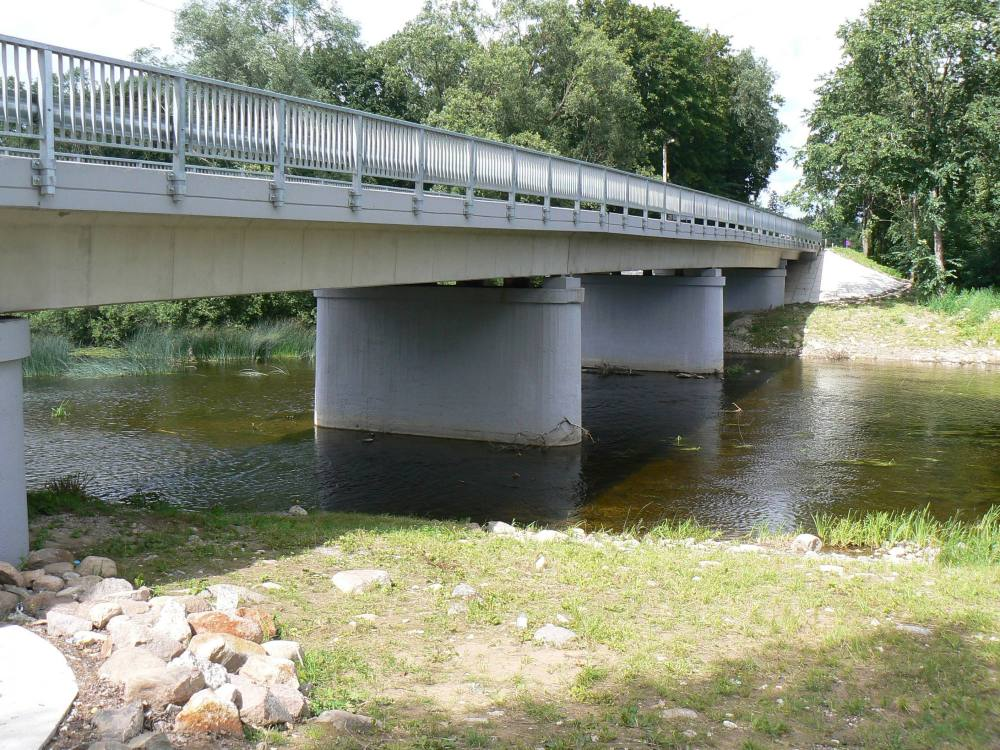
Suurejõe road bridge
