= Lotte (Estonian literature) =

Fictional character from Estonian literature

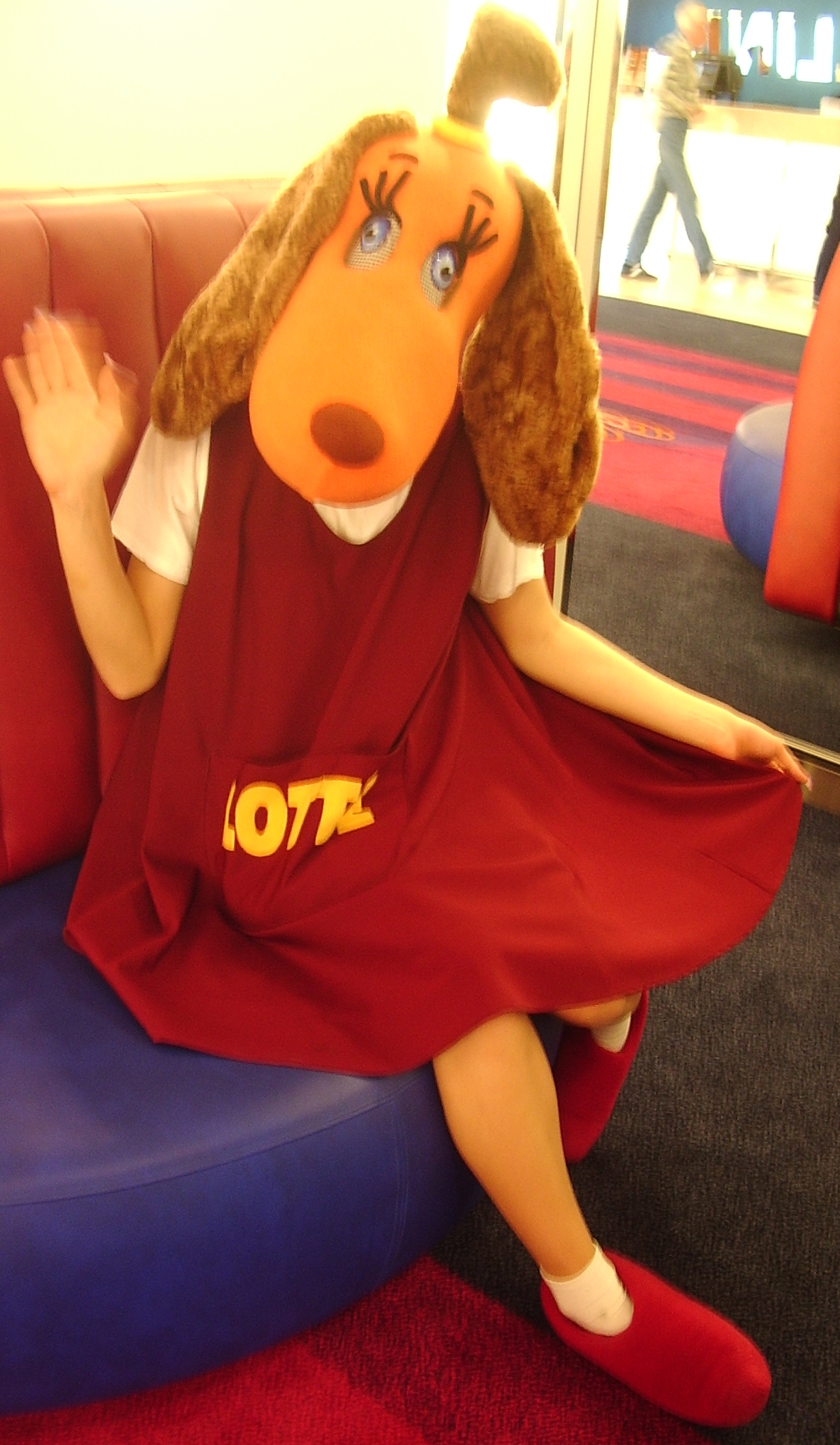
Lotte

Lotte is a fictional character that appears in an Estonian children's book series and animated film series, the direct-to-DVD Lotte's Journey South (2000) and theatrical Lotte from Gadgetville (2006), Lotte and the Moonstone Secret (2011) and Lotte and the Lost Dragons (2019).

Lotte was created by Janno Põldma and Heiki Ernits. Lotte has a dog-like head, red hair, and is a rather mischievous girl. Lotte lives in Gadgetville (Estonian: Leiutajateküla). Texts about Lotte are written by Andrus Kivirähk.

Because of Lotte's popularity in Estonia, a Lotte-related theme park (or Lotte Village) was opened in 2014 in Reiu village, Pärnu County. The park is operated by Lottemaa Teemapark OÜ.
