= Pikkjärv (Ongassaare) =

Lake in Estonia

- Location within Estonia
- Coordinates: 59.1803°N 27.4714°E
- Basin countries: Estonia
- Max. length: 430 meters (1,410 ft)
- Surface area: 1.9 hectares (4.7 acres)
- Shore length^{1}: 960 meters (3,150 ft)
- Surface elevation: 51.5 meters (169 ft)
- ^{1} Shore length is not a well-defined measure.

Pikkjärv (also Kõnnu Pikkjärv or 1. Kõnnu järv) is a lake in Estonia. It is located in the village of Ongassaare (formerly Kõnnu) in Alutaguse Parish, Ida-Viru County.

== Physical description ==
The lake has an area of 1.9 hectares (4.7 acres). It is 430 meters (1,410 ft) long, and its shoreline measures 960 meters (3,150 ft).

== See also ==
- List of lakes of Estonia
