= Pale (river) =

River in Estonia

Coordinates: 58.2423°N 25.1529°E

Location
- Country: Estonia

Physical characteristics
- Mouth
  - location: Halliste
- Length: 22 km (14 mi)
- Basin size: 111 km^{2} (43 sq mi)

The Pale is a river in Viljandi County, Estonia.
