= Pada (river) =

River in Estonia

Pada River

Location
- Country: Estonia

Physical characteristics
- Mouth: Gulf of Finland
  - coordinates: 59°29′59″N 26°46′06″E
- Length: 40.4 km (25.1 mi)
- Basin size: 191.1 km^{2} (73.8 sq mi)

The Pada River is a river in Lääne-Viru County, Estonia. The river is 40.4 km (25.1 mi) long, and its basin size is 191.1 km^{2} (73.8 sq mi). It discharges into the Gulf of Finland.

Trout and grayling live in the river.
