= Taebla (river) =

River in Estonia

Taebla River

Location
- Country: Estonia

Physical characteristics
- Mouth: Baltic Sea
  - coordinates: 58°58′20″N 23°39′49″E
- Length: 33.5 km (20.8 mi)
- Basin size: 114.2 km^{2} (44.1 sq mi)

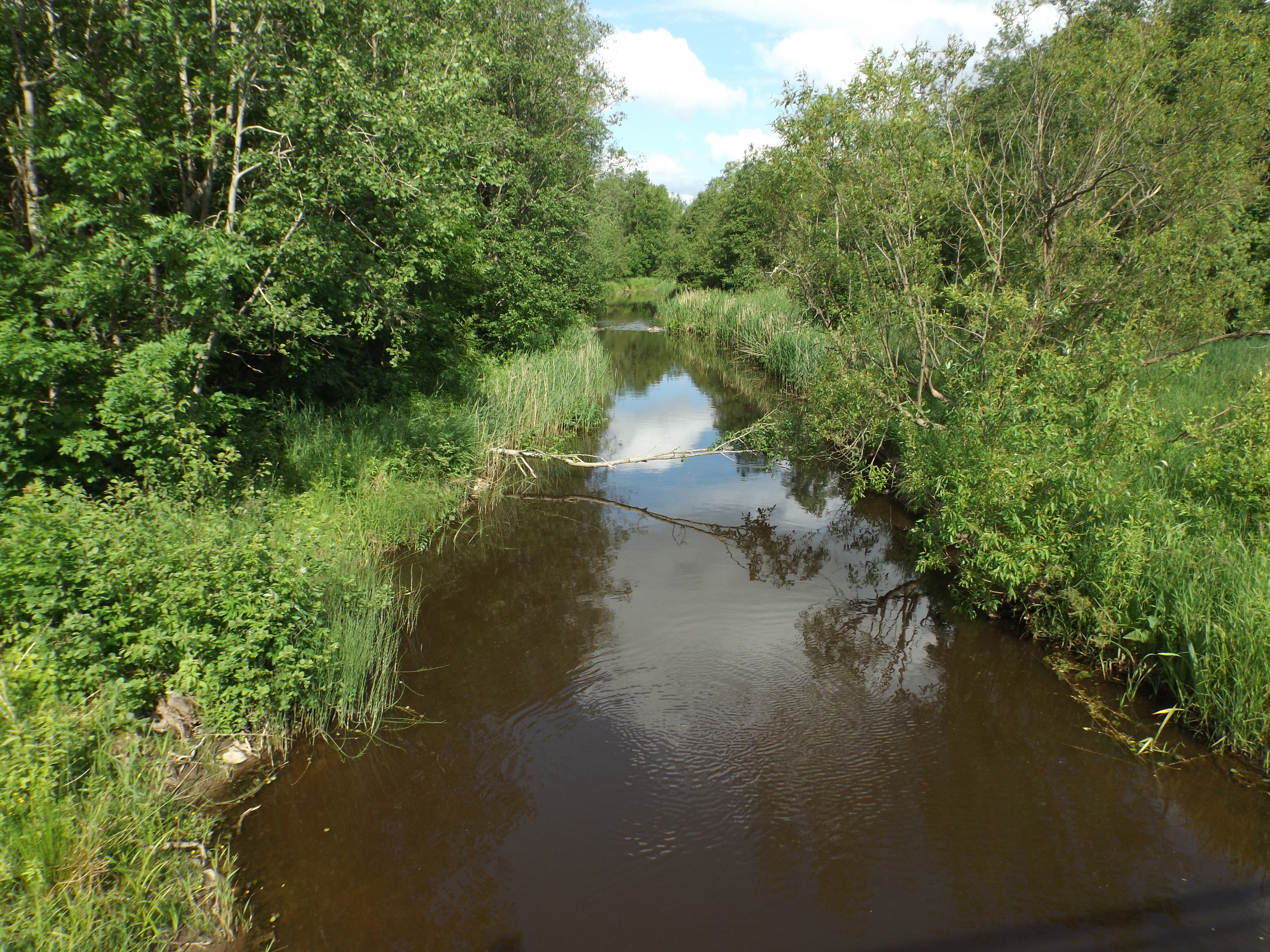
Taebla River near the Keila-Haapsalu national road.

The Taebla River is a river in Lääne County, Estonia. The river is 33.5 km long, and its basin size is 114.2 km^{2}. It runs into the Baltic Sea.
