= Kloostri (river) =

River in Estonia

Kloostri River
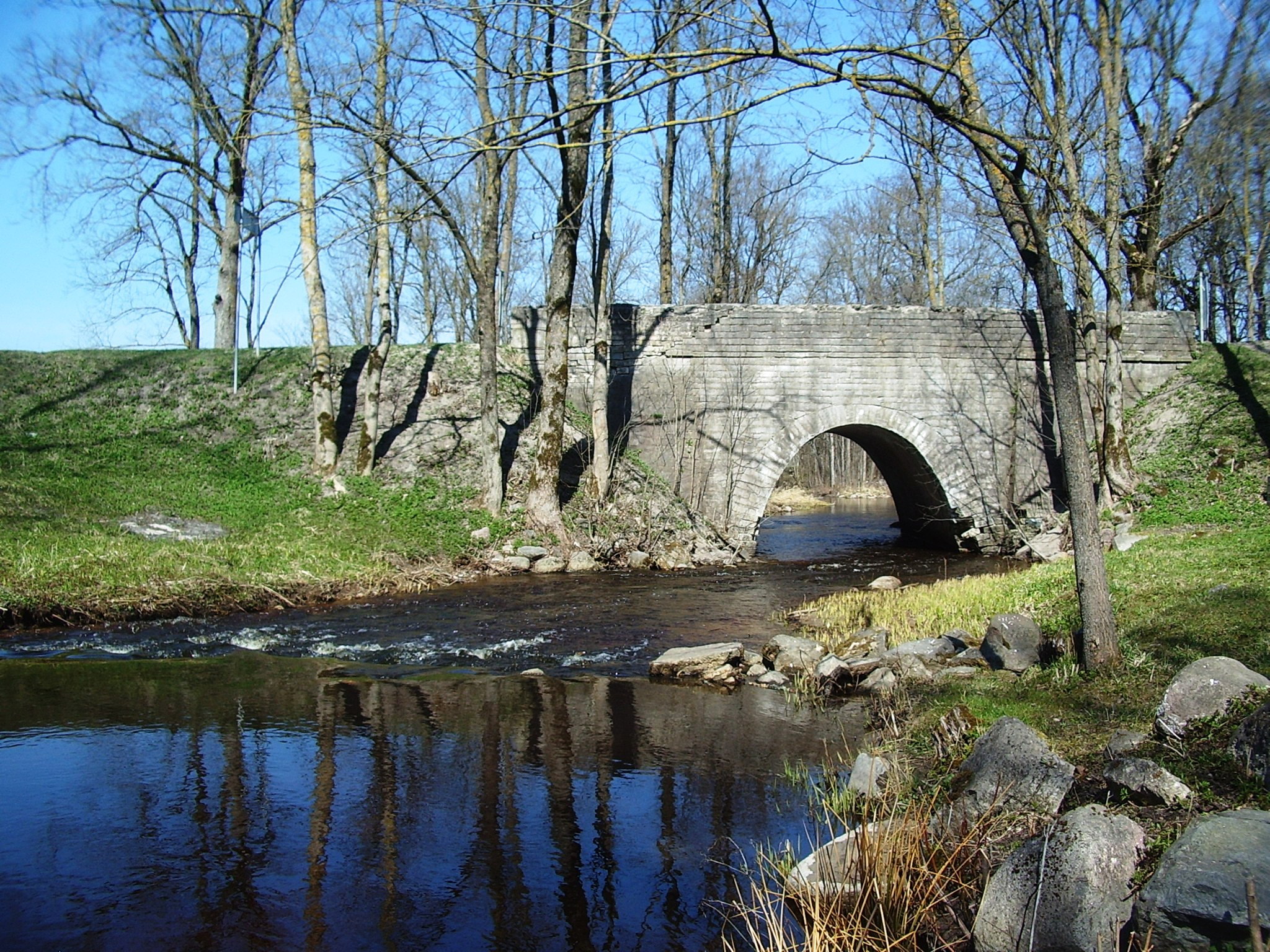

Location
- Country: Estonia

Physical characteristics
- Mouth: Gulf of Finland
  - coordinates: 59°16′24″N 24°04′36″E
- Length: 36.9 km
- Basin size: 91.7 km²

The Kloostri River is a river in Harju County, Estonia. The river is 36.9 km long, and its basin covers 91.7 km^{2}. It discharges into the Gulf of Finland.
