= Peetri (river) =

River in Estonia

Peetri River
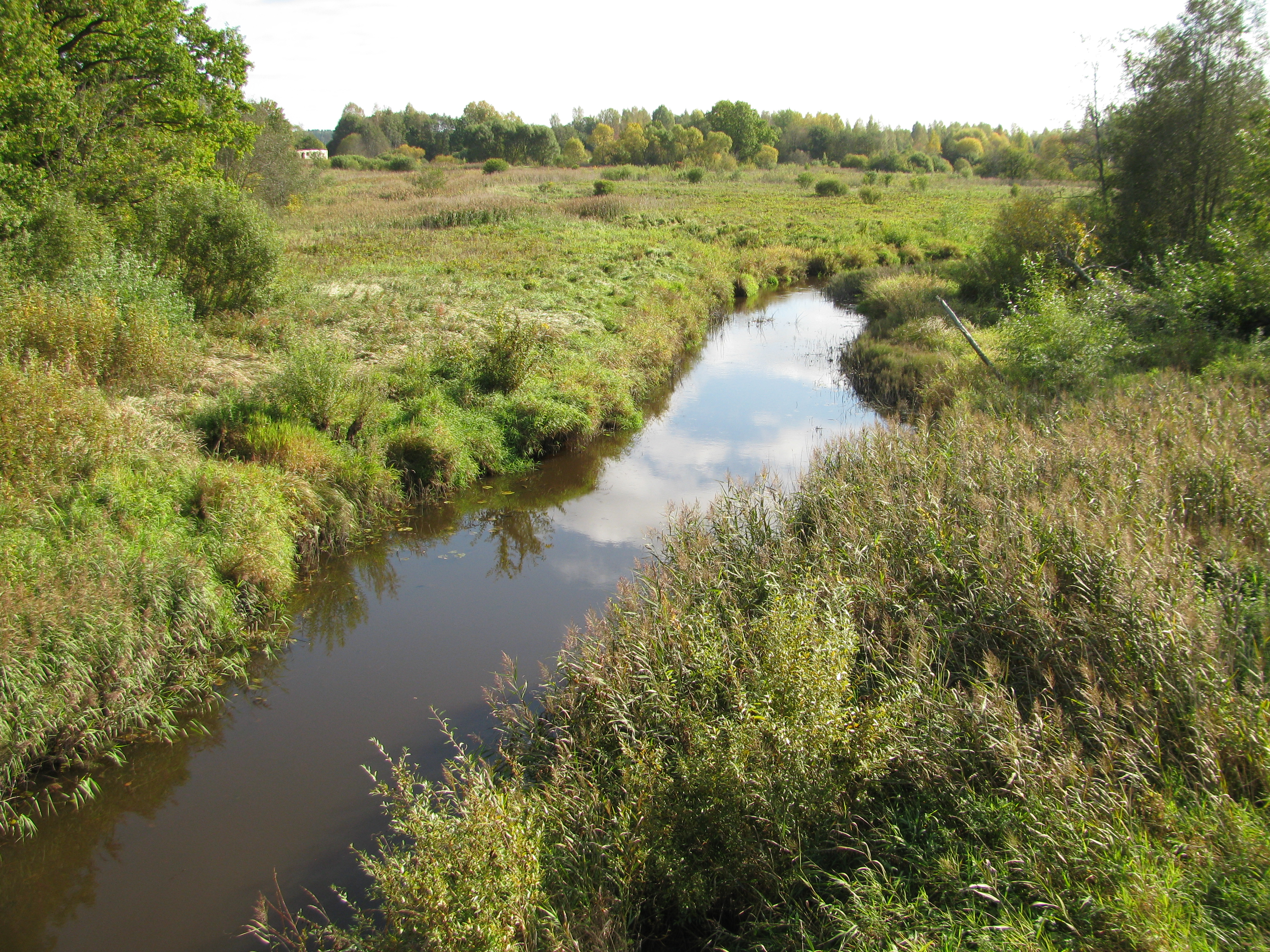

Location
- Country: Estonia

Physical characteristics
- Mouth: Mustjõgi
  - coordinates: 57°35′43″N 26°30′03″E
- Length: 26.7 km (16.6 mi)
- Basin size: 43 km^{2} (17 sq mi)

The Peetri River is a river in Võru County, Estonia. The river is 26.7 km long, and its basin size is 43 km^{2}. It discharges into the Mustjõgi.

Trout and grayling also live in the river.
