= Vändra (river) =

River in Estonia

Vändra River

Location
- Country: Estonia

Physical characteristics
- Mouth: Pärnu River
  - coordinates: 58°33′11″N 24°57′15″E
- Length: 50.1 km
- Basin size: 254.9 km²

Vändra River is a river in Pärnu, Järva and Rapla County, Estonia. The river is 50.1 km long and basin size is 254.9 km². It runs into Pärnu River.
