= Reiu (river) =

River in Estonia and Latvia

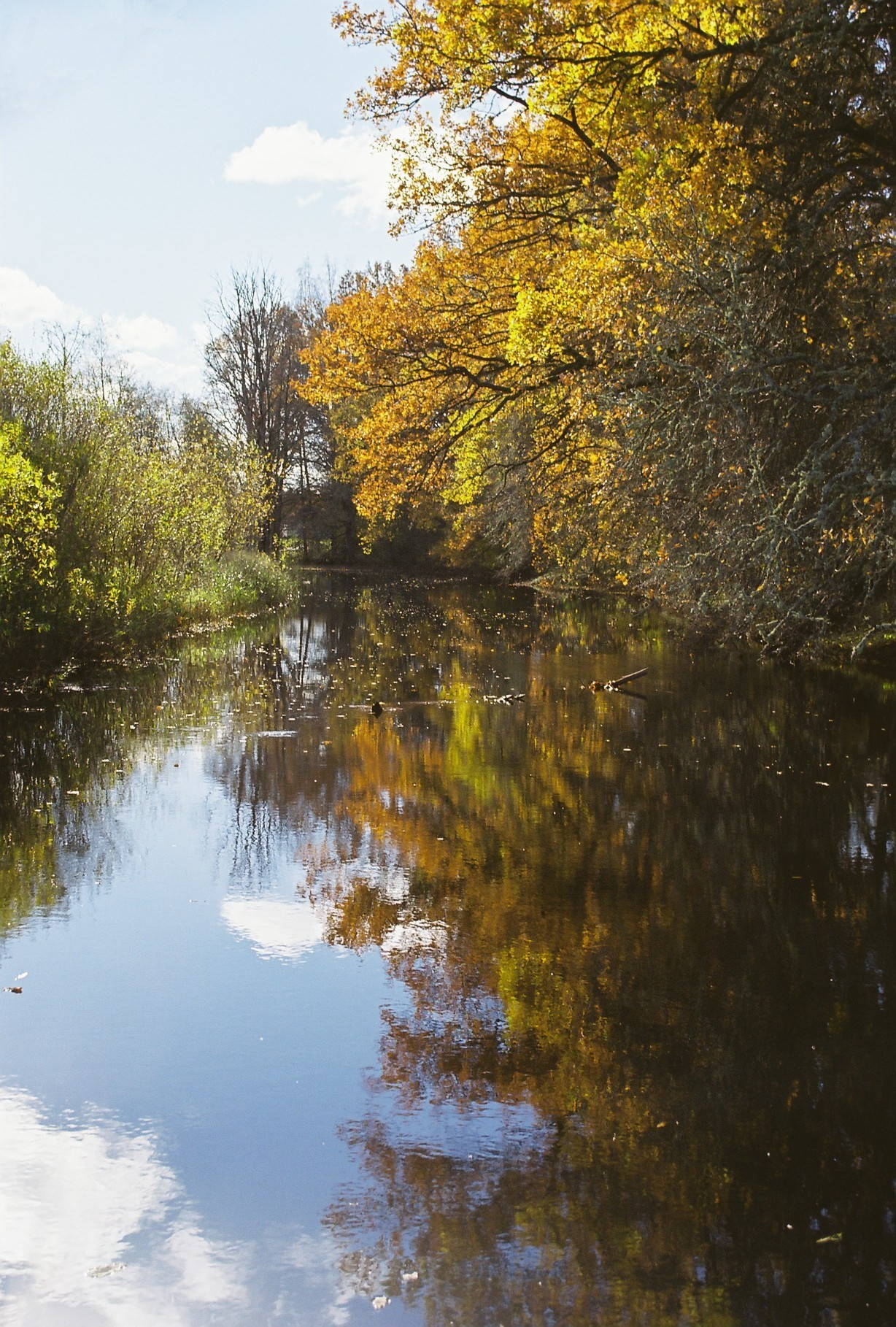

Location
- Countries: Estonia; Latvia

Physical characteristics
- Source
  - location: Soka Lake
  - coordinates: 57°58′44.53″N 24°47′25.76″E
  - elevation: 50 m (160 ft)
- Mouth
  - location: Pärnu River
  - coordinates: 58°22′0.3″N 24°35′36.97″E
- Length: 73 km (45 mi)
- Basin size: 917 km^{2} (354 sq mi)
- Discharge
  - average: 17.3 m^{3}/s (610 cu ft/s)

The Reiu is a 73 km (45 mi) long river in southwest Estonia. Its source is Lake Soka in Latvia. It flows generally north. It is a left tributary of the Pärnu River, which it flows into near the city of Pärnu. The basin area of the Reiu is 917 km^{2}, and its average discharge 17.3 m³/s. Archaeologists have found stone age constructions on the banks of the river which they noted as potentially being one of the oldest such constructions in Estonia, dating back to roughly 5300 BCE.
