= Selja (river) =

River in Estonia

Selja River
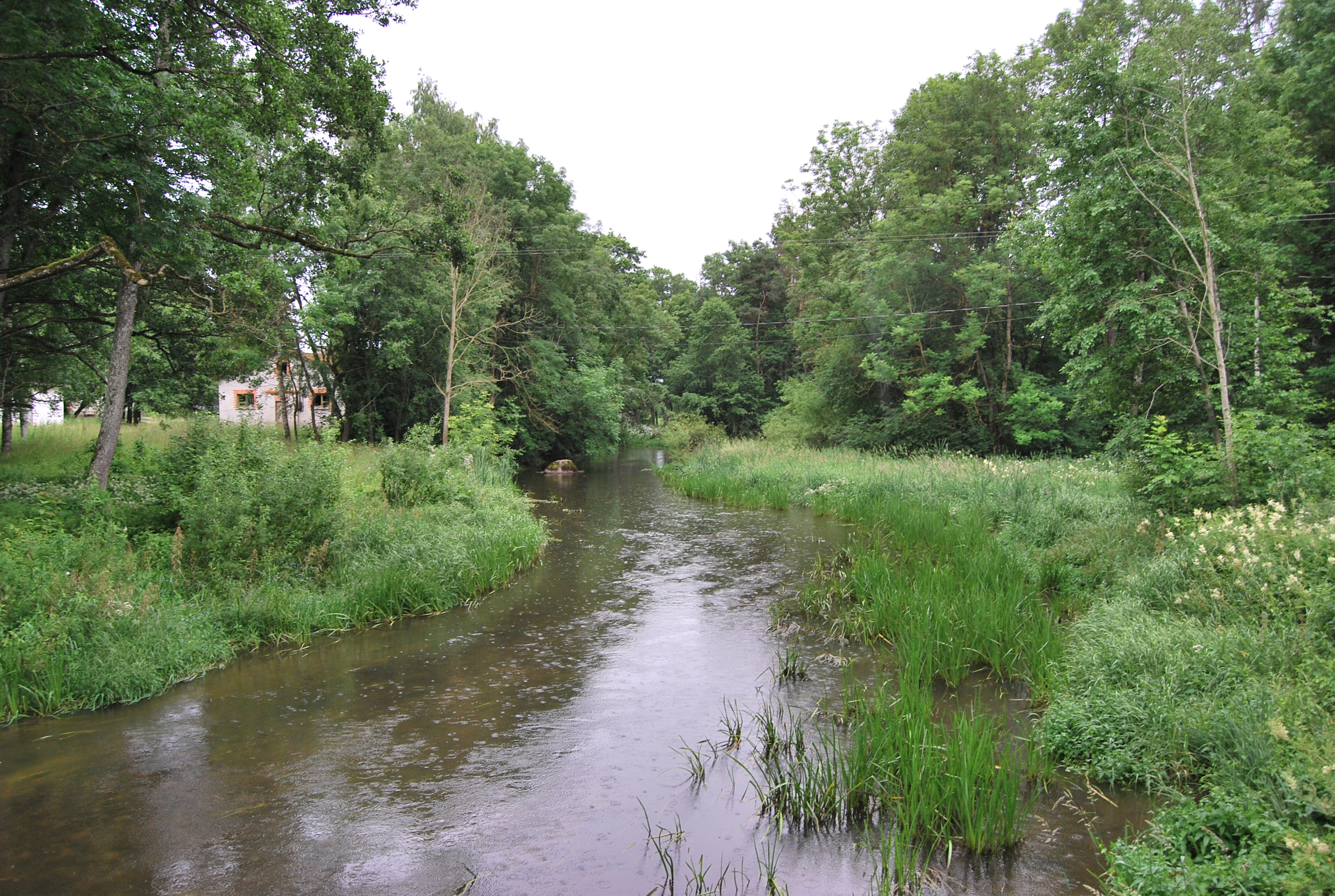

Location
- Country: Estonia

Physical characteristics
- Mouth: Gulf of Finland
  - coordinates: 59°32′56″N 26°24′14″E
- Length: 47.7 km (29.6 mi)
- Basin size: 422.6 km^{2} (163.2 sq mi)

The Selja River is a river in Lääne-Viru County, Estonia. The river is 47.7 km long, and its basin size is 422.6 km^{2}. It runs into the Gulf of Finland.

Trout and grayling live in the river.
