= Mustjõgi =

River in Estonia

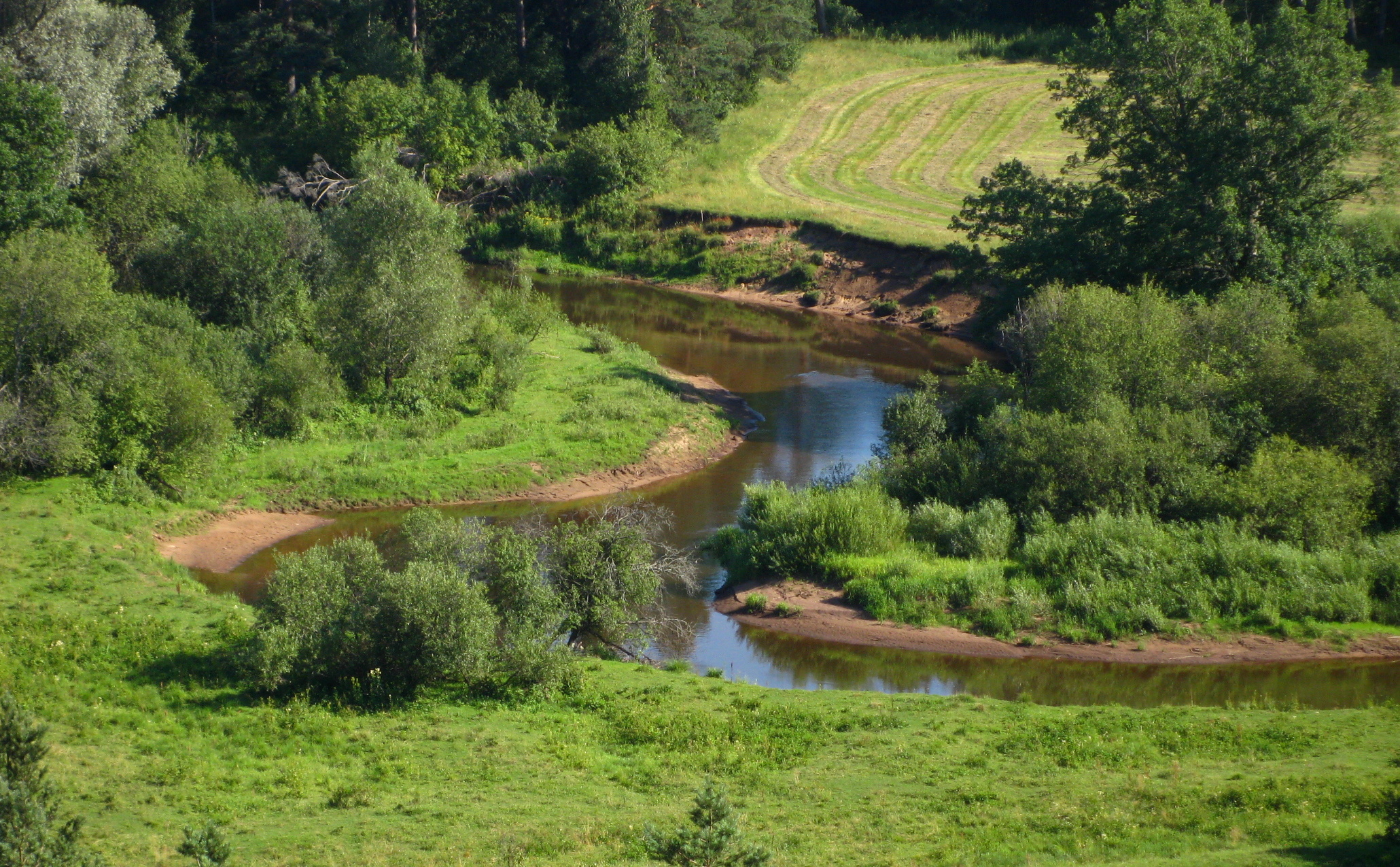

Location
- Country: Estonia, Latvia

Physical characteristics
- Mouth: Koiva River
  - coordinates: 57°35′36″N 26°18′40″E
- Length: 94 km (58 mi)

The Mustjõgi (Latvian: Mustjegi) is a river on the Estonia–Latvia border. The river is 94 km long. The river starts from Suur Saarjärv and discharges into the Gauja River.
