= Häädemeeste Parish =

Municipality of Estonia

Coordinates: 58°5′N 24°30′E

Häädemeeste Parish Häädemeeste vald
- Municipality of Estonia
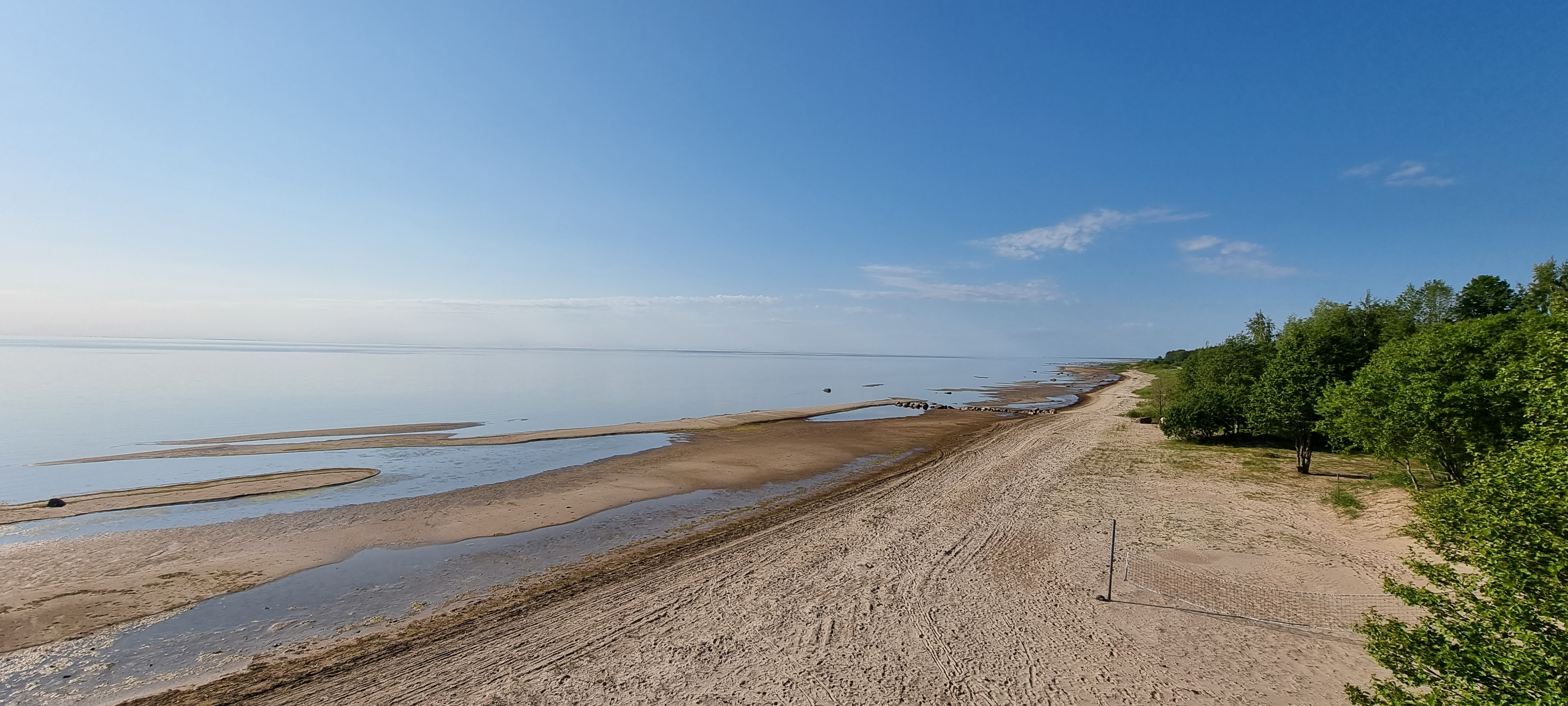
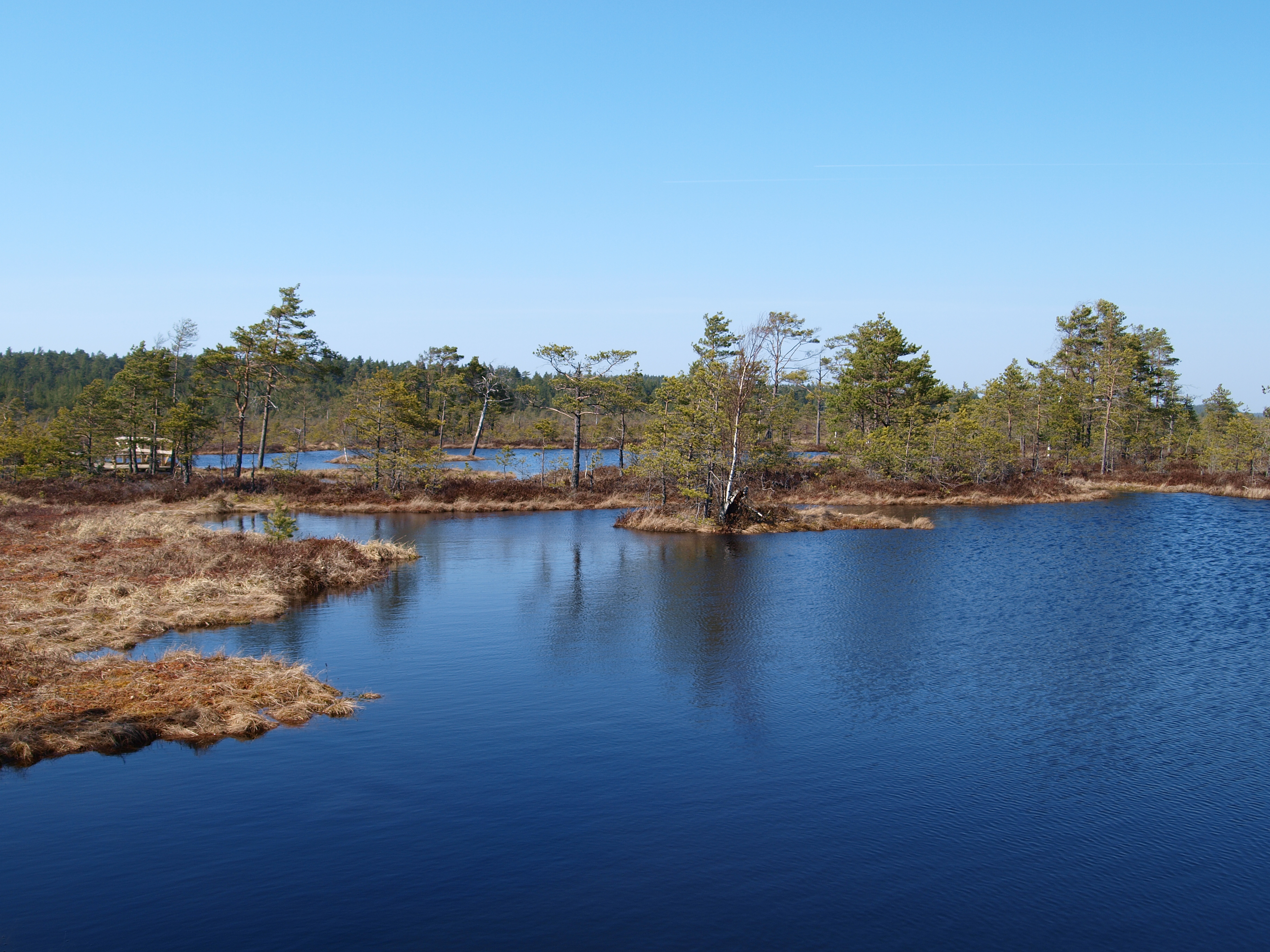
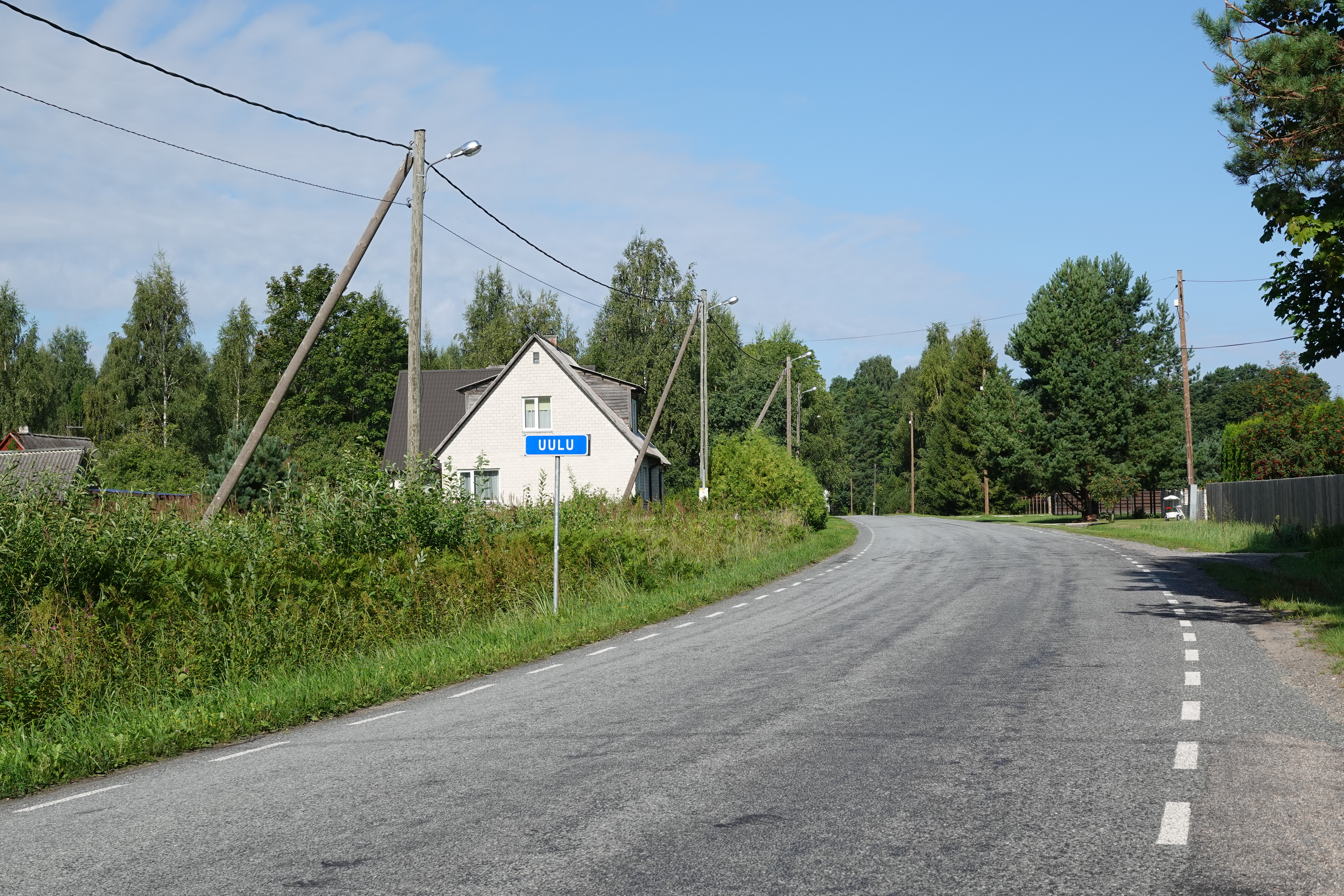
- Beach in Kabli Tolkuse bog Entering Uulu

- Flag Coat of arms

- Häädemeeste Parish within Pärnu County.
- Country: Estonia
- County: Pärnu County
- Administrative centre: Häädemeeste

Area
  - Total: 494 km^{2} (191 sq mi)

Population (2026)
  - Total: 4,733
  - Density: 9.58/km^{2} (24.8/sq mi)
- ISO 3166 code: EE-214
- Website: www.haademeeste.ee

Häädemeeste (German: Gudmannsbach) is a municipality located in Pärnu County of Estonia. Häädemeeste literally means "(place) of good men" in Estonian.

Nigula Nature Reserve is partly located in Häädemeeste Parish. The largest river in the parish is the Rannametsa.

Tahkuranna in the municipality is known as the birthplace of Konstantin Päts, the first president of Estonia, and there is a monument dedicated to him at his birthplace.

== Demographics ==
As of 1 January 2026, the parish had 4,733 residents, of which 2,426 (51.3%) were women and 2,307 (48.7%) were men.

=== Religion ===
In terms of religion in the 2021 census of at least 15-years old residents 8.2% of the residents of the parish declared themselves Lutheran, 7.2% declared themselves Orthodox. 2.1% of the population followed other religions or did not specify their religious affiliation. The majority of residents of the parish, 82.5% declared themselves religiously unaffiliated.

== Twinnings ==
- Hankasalmi, Finland

== Education and culture ==
The largest school in the municipality is Häädemeeste Secondary School. The parish has a municipal museum, located in Häädemeeste. There are several libraries in the municipality.

During the summer, the municipality attracts many vacationers thanks to the seaside.
