= Highways in Estonia =

Map of the Estonian national highway network

Highways in Estonia are the main transport network in Estonia. The Estonian national classification includes several classes of highways:

- Main road (põhimaantee) – connects the capital with other large cities, connects large cities and the capital with major ports, railway junctions and border crossings.
- Basic road (tugimaantee) – highway, that connects towns with other towns and main routes (literal translation: support highway).
- Secondary road (kõrvalmaantee) – highway, that connects towns with boroughs, connects boroughs and villages and all of the previous with main- and support routes (literal translation: side highway)

Other than these, the national road classification includes the following categories which may also be referred to as highways in a general sense, with decreasing order of priority (and applicability of the term highway):

- National ice road (jäätee) - temporary road made on a frozen body of water for vehicles and pedestrians which has been added to the national road registry
- Connecting road (ühendustee) – collectors, access roads, ramps or other similar roads constructed for traffic flow canalisation and providing safety on intersections/interchanges
- Other (muu) – other roads in the national road registry

Main and support routes are designated with 1-2 digit numbers 1-99. Side routes are designated with 4-5 digit numbers, where the first two digits is a county code (11-25 for 15 counties), followed with three digits 101-999.

In addition to state highways, there are 23 882 km of local roads and around 48 999 km of private and forest roads. The total Estonian road network is 89 871 km long.

== Technical classification of highways in Estonia ==
Under earlier legislation, roads were classified according to traffic density into seven classes - "motorway" and classes I-VI to establish design standards (such as cross-section width). This classification was abolished in 2023.

== Main routes ==
Map of the Estonian main roads network (põhimaanteed)

The backbone of the Estonian national route system, national main routes (põhimaanteed) make up a network of 1603 kilometres of road, amounting to 10% of the total national road network. The traffic numbers however make up nearly 50% of the Estonian road network's traffic volumes. The highest AADT's are around Tallinn, on the T1 between Loo and Maardu, on the T2 between Tallinn and Jüri, and on the T4 between Laagri and Kanama (the highest AADT on Estonian national routes at 31,000). A main route is defined as a highway that connects the capital with other large cities or connects large cities and the capital with major ports, railway points and border crossings. Currently there are 12 separate main routes, which are marked with 1–2 white digits on a red shield. The speed limits on Estonian main routes are 110 or 120 on 2+2 sections and 90 on regular roads (on newer sections of road, these are adjusted according to conditions by electronic speed limit signs).

The main routes are the only roads with I class highways. The total amount is 234.6 kilometres, found on the T1, T2, T4 and T11. This number will enlarge significantly with further upgrades of the T4 in several sections between Ääsmäe and Pärnu, T2 Between Mäo and Tartu to I class highway. There are currently no motorways in Estonia, however 45,3 kilometres of the T2 is restricted-access I class highway. Ten main routes are a part of TEN-T, six routes are a part of the International E-road network. The routes E263, E67, E20, E264 and E265 run through Estonia.

The highways are maintained by the Estonian Road Administration outside city limits. Inside cities and towns, the roads are maintained by the city government.

=== List of main routes ===
| Route | County | Length | Description | Notes |
|---|---|---|---|---|
| T1 | Harjumaa, Lääne-Virumaa, Ida-Virumaa | 212.6 km (132.1 mi) | The T1 starts at Viru Väljak in Tallinn. The road passes through Tallinn, intersects with the T11 at Väo and proceeds east towards Rakvere. The route then continues east towards Jõhvi, Sillamäe and Narva, finally terminating in Narva at the Russian border. | I class highway for 88 kilometres in two separate sections. |
| T2 | Harjumaa, Järvamaa, Jõgevamaa, Tartumaa, Põlvamaa, Võrumaa | 287.8 km (178.8 mi) | The T2 starts at Ülemiste in Tallinn. The road passes through Tallinn and proceeds south-east towards Jüri. Here the road intersects with the T11. The route then continues southeast towards Tartu, Võru and Luhamaa, finally terminating in Luhamaa at the T7. | I class highway for 91 kilometres in two separate sections. Several exist 2+1 sections, totaling 22 kilometres. |
| T3 | Ida-Virumaa, Jõgevamaa, Tartumaa, Valgamaa | 219.6 km (136.5 mi) | The T3 starts at the T1 interchange in Jõhvi. The road passes through Jõhvi and proceeds southwest through Ahtme and towards Tartu. After Tartu the route continues southwest towards Elva and Valga, finally terminating in Valga at the Latvian border. | |
| T4 | Harjumaa, Raplamaa, Pärnumaa | 192.3 km (119.5 mi) | The T4 starts at Viru Väljak in Tallinn. The road passes through Tallinn and proceeds south towards Pärnu. The route then continues south towards Märjamaa and Pärnu, finally terminating in Ikla at the Latvian border. | I class highway for 22 kilometres in 2 separate sections. Two 2+1 sections exist totaling 15.1 km |
| T5 | Lääne-Virumaa, Järvamaa, Pärnumaa | 184.6 km (114.7 mi) | The T5 starts at the intersection with the T4 in Pärnu. The road proceeds northeast towards Paide. After intersecting with the T2 at Mäo, the route then continues northeast towards Tapa and Rakvere, finally terminating in Sõmeru at the T1. | |
| T6 | Pärnumaa, Viljandimaa, Valgamaa | 124.8 km (77.5 mi) | The T6 starts at the Latvian border in Valga. The road passes through Valga and proceeds northwest towards Tõrva. After Tõrva the route continues northwest towards Uulu finally terminating in Uulu at the T4. | |
| T7 | Võrumaa | 22 km (14 mi) | The T7 starts at Misso at the Latvian border. The road shortly after passes through Misso and proceeds east towards Luhamaa. The route then intersects with the T2 and continues east towards the Russian border. | Shortest highway in Estonia. |
| T8 | Harjumaa | 47.2 km (29.3 mi) | The T8 starts at Tallinn. The road passes through Tallinn, intersects with the T11 at Keila and proceeds west towards Paldiski. The route then terminates at Paldiski. | |
| T9 | Harjumaa, Läänemaa | 80.5 km (50.0 mi) | The T9 starts at the interchange with the T4 in Ääsmäe. The road proceeds southwest towards Haapsalu. After intersecting with the T10 in Risti, the route continues west towards Haapsalu, finally terminating in Rohuküla port. | |
| T10 | Harjumaa, Läänemaa, Saaremaa | 143.7 km (89.3 mi) | The T10 starts at the intersection with the T9 at Risti. The road proceeds southwest towards Virtsu port. The route includes a ferry crossing to Muhu island (Kuivastu port), shortly after crossing to Saaremaa via the Väinatamm causeway, after which it continues southwest towards Kuressaare, terminating there. | Only national route to include a ferry crossing. |
| T11 | Harjumaa | 38.1 km (23.7 mi) | The T11 is Tallinn's ring road. The T11 starts at the intersection with the T1 at Väo. The road passes by Jüri, intersecting with the T2, by Luige, intersecting with the 15, by Saue, intersecting with the T4 and finally terminating at Keila, when intersecting with the T8. | I class highway for 33.6 kilometres. Yet to be built to I class standards between Vanamõisa and Keila. |
| T92 | Tartumaa, Viljandimaa, Pärnumaa | 122.8 km (76.3 mi) | The T92 starts at the intersection with the T2 at Tartu. The road proceeds west towards Viljandi. After going through Viljandi, the route then continues west towards Kilingi-Nõmme, finally terminating in Väljaküla at the T6. | |

== Support routes ==
Map of the Estonian basic roads network (tugimaanteed)

Support routes (tugimaanteed) are the second highest classification in the Estonian national route system. They make up a network of 2,405 kilometres of road, amounting to 15% of the total road network. A support route is defined as a highway that connects towns with other towns and main routes. Currently there are 77 separate support routes. The support routes are marked with 2 black digits on a yellow shield.

=== List of support routes ===
| Route | Control city | Intermediate point(s) | Control city | Length |
|---|---|---|---|---|
| T12 | Kose | | Jägala | 36.1 km (22.4 mi) |
| T13 | Jägala | | Käravete | 52.7 km (32.7 mi) |
| T14 | Kose | | Purila | 39.1 km (24.3 mi) |
| T15 | Tallinn | Rapla | Türi | 97.2 km (60.4 mi) |
| T17 | Keila | | Haapsalu | 68.8 km (42.8 mi) |
| T18 | Niitvälja | | Kulna | 4.7 km (2.9 mi) |
| T20 | Põdruse | Kunda | Pada | 28.3 km (17.6 mi) |
| T21 | Rakvere | | Luige | 69.6 km (43.2 mi) |
| T22 | Rakvere | Väike-Maarja | Vägeva | 52.0 km (32.3 mi) |
| T23 | Rakvere | | Haljala | 8.3 km (5.2 mi) |
| T24 | Tapa | | Loobu | 26.0 km (16.2 mi) |
| T25 | Mäeküla | Koeru | Kapu | 25.3 km (15.7 mi) |
| T26 | Türi | | Arkma | 21.2 km (13.2 mi) |
| T27 | Rapla | Järvakandi | Kergu | 40.8 km (25.4 mi) |
| T28 | Rapla | | Märjamaa | 21.6 km (13.4 mi) |
| T29 | Märjamaa | | Koluvere | 25.1 km (15.6 mi) |
| T31 | Haapsalu | | Laiküla | 36.0 km (22.4 mi) |
| T32 | Jõhvi | | Vasknarva | 49.9 km (31.0 mi) |
| T33 | Jõhvi | | Kose | 3.6 km (2.2 mi) |
| T34 | Varja | | Kiviõli | 8.7 km (5.4 mi) |
| T35 | Iisaku | Tudulinna | Avinurme | 33.5 km (20.8 mi) |
| T36 | Jõgeva | | Mustvee | 38.9 km (24.2 mi) |
| T37 | Jõgeva | | Põltsamaa | 26.1 km (16.2 mi) |
| T38 | Põltsamaa | | Võhma | 27.6 km (17.1 mi) |
| T39 | Tartu | Jõgeva | Aravete | 108.0 km (67.1 mi) |
| T40 | Tartu | | Tiksoja | 7.0 km (4.3 mi) |
| T41 | Kärevere | | Kärkna | 12.9 km (8.0 mi) |
| T42 | Kärkna | | Kobratu | 7.1 km (4.4 mi) |
| T43 | Aovere | Kallaste | Kasepää | 57.0 km (35.4 mi) |
| T44 | Aovere | | Luunja | 11.4 km (7.1 mi) |
| T45 | Tartu | Räpina | Värska | 85.5 km (53.1 mi) |
| T46 | Tatra | Otepää | Sangaste | 46.6 km (29.0 mi) |
| T47 | Sangla | | Rõngu | 22.4 km (13.9 mi) |
| T49 | Imavere | Viljandi | Karksi-Nuia | 82.1 km (51.0 mi) |
| T50 | Aindu | | Viljandi | 4.4 km (2.7 mi) |
| T51 | Viljandi | | Põltsamaa | 43.4 km (27.0 mi) |
| T52 | Viljandi | | Rõngu | 61.1 km (38.0 mi) |
| T53 | Ojaperve | | Viiratsi | 3.6 km (2.2 mi) |
| T54 | Karksi-Nuia | Lilli | border with Latvia | 17.0 km (10.6 mi) |
| T55 | Kamara | Mõisaküla | border with Latvia (also known as Mõisaküla road) | 4.4 km (2.7 mi) |
| T57 | Mudiste | Suure-Jaani | Vändra | 42.8 km (26.6 mi) |
| T58 | Aluste | | Kergu | 12.2 km (7.6 mi) |
| T59 | Pärnu | | Tori | 23.5 km (14.6 mi) |
| T60 | Pärnu | | Lihula | 56.1 km (34.9 mi) |
| T61 | Põlva | | Reola | 37.1 km (23.1 mi) |
| T62 | Kanepi | | Leevaku | 41.8 km (26.0 mi) |
| T63 | Karisilla | Koidula border checkpoint with Russia | Petseri (Печоры) | 17.8 km (11.1 mi) |
| T64 | Võru | | Põlva | 24.7 km (15.3 mi) |
| T65 | Võru | | Räpina | 44.0 km (27.3 mi) |
| T66 | Võru | | Verijärve | 6.5 km (4.0 mi) |
| T67 | Võru | Mõniste | Valga | 83.3 km (51.8 mi) |
| T68 | Mõniste | border with Latvia | Ape | 8.9 km (5.5 mi) |
| T69 | Võru | Kuigasti | Tõrva | 71.3 km (44.3 mi) |
| T70 | Antsla | | Vaabina | 6.9 km (4.3 mi) |
| T71 | Rõngu | Otepää | Kanepi | 39.3 km (24.4 mi) |
| T72 | Sangaste | | Tõlliste | 16.6 km (10.3 mi) |
| T73 | Tõrva | | Pikasilla | 12.0 km (7.5 mi) |
| T75 | Tumala | Orissaare | Väinatamm causeway | 8.3 km (5.2 mi) |
| T76 | Kuressaare ring road | | | 13.5 km (8.4 mi) |
| T77 | Kuressaare | | Sääre | 47.4 km (29.5 mi) |
| T78 | Kuressaare | Kihelkonna | Veere | 47.8 km (29.7 mi) |
| T79 | Upa | | Leisi | 36.8 km (22.9 mi) |
| T80 | Heltermaa port | Kärdla | Luidja | 50.2 km (31.2 mi) |
| T81 | Kärdla | | Käina | 21.7 km (13.5 mi) |
| T82 | | | Lehtma port (also known as Lehtma port road) | 7.0 km (4.3 mi) |
| T83 | Suuremõisa | Käina | Emmaste | 31.2 km (19.4 mi) |
| T84 | Emmaste | | Luidja | 29.9 km (18.6 mi) |
| T85 | Liiapeksi | | Loksa | 15.5 km (9.6 mi) |
| T86 | Kuressaare | Võhma | Panga | 36.8 km (22.9 mi) |
| T87 | Põlva ring road | | | 6.0 km (3.7 mi) |
| T88 | Rakvere | | Rannapungerja | 70.8 km (44.0 mi) |
| T89 | Põlva | | Saverna | 20.4 km (12.7 mi) |
| T90 | Põlva | | Karisilla | 34.2 km (21.3 mi) |
| T91 | Narva | Narva-Jõesuu | Hiiemetsa | 26.3 km (16.3 mi) |
| T93 | Kohtla-Järve | Kukruse | Tammiku | 15.6 km (9.7 mi) |
| T94 | Liivamäe | | Muuga container port (also known as Muuga port road) | 3.4 km (2.1 mi) |
| T95 | Kõrveküla | | Tartu | 1.9 km (1.2 mi) |

== Secondary routes ==
Secondary roads make up the vast majority of Estonia's road network and form the backbone of rural transport. There are a total of 1785 secondary roads in the registry, the shortest of them 70 metres and the longest 76,8 kilometres long. The county codes used in the numbering system are as follows:

| County | Digits |
|---|---|
| Harjumaa | 11xxx |
| Hiiumaa | 12xxx |
| Ida-Virumaa | 13xxx |
| Jõgevamaa | 14xxx |
| Järvamaa | 15xxx |
| Läänemaa | 16xxx |
| Lääne-Virumaa | 17xxx |
| Põlvamaa | 18xxx |
| Pärnumaa | 19xxx |
| Raplamaa | 20xxx |
| Saaremaa | 21xxx |
| Tartumaa | 22xxx |
| Valgamaa | 23xxx |
| Viljandimaa | 24xxx |
| Võrumaa | 25xxx |

== European routes ==
Map of the Estonian E-roads network

Estonia is a part of the UNECE, and therefore also has numerous E-roads running through it. The E-roads in Estonia form a network on top of the main routes and are usually signposted on all signs. They make up a network of 994 kilometres (618 miles) of road. Currently there are six separate European routes in Estonia.

=== List of European routes ===
| Route | Estonian route | Control cities | Length |
|---|---|---|---|
| E20 | T1 | Tallinn, Narva | 212.6 km (132.1 mi) |
| E67 | T4 | Tallinn, Pärnu, Ikla | 192.3 km (119.5 mi) |
| E77 | T7 | Luhamaa border checkpoint, Misso border crossing | 22.0 km (13.7 mi) |
| E263 | T2 | Tallinn, Tartu, Võru, Luhamaa | 287.8 km (178.8 mi) |
| E264 | T3 | Jõhvi, Tartu, Valga | 219.6 km (136.5 mi) |
| E265 | T8 / T11 | Tallinn ring road, Paldiski | 60.4 km (37.5 mi) |

== Former (historical) roads ==
- Piibe road

== See also ==
- Transport in Estonia
