= Estonian national road 10 =

Road in Estonia

National Road 10
- Põhimaantee 10
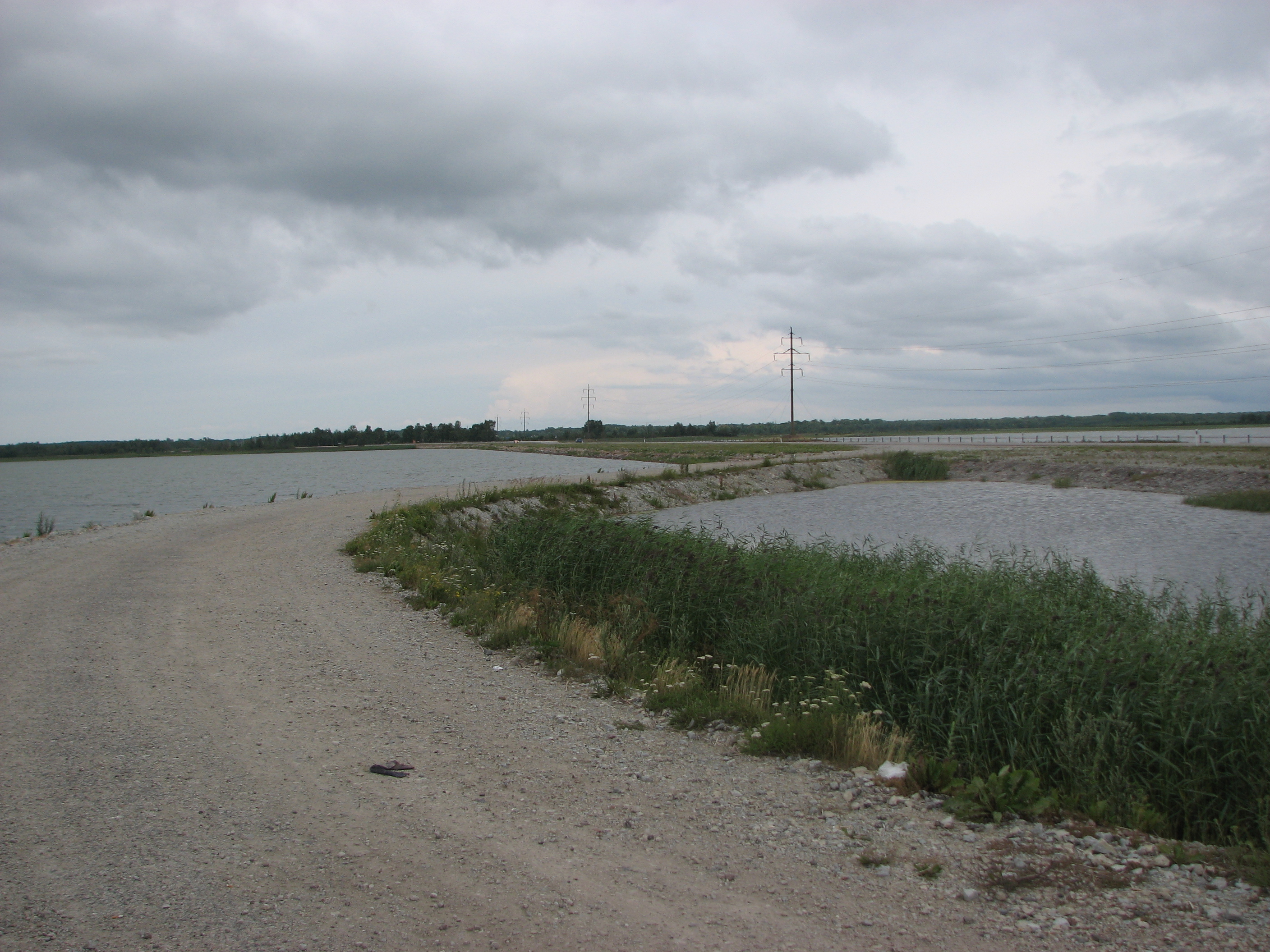

Route information
- Length: 143 km (89 mi)

Major junctions
- From: Risti
- Koluvere Laiküla; Lihula; Väike väin Tumala; Upa; Kuressaare Kuressaare
- To: Kuressaare

Location
- Country: Estonia
- Counties: Lääne County Pärnu County Saare County

Highway system
- Transport in Estonia
← T9	→ T11

National Road 10 (also known as Risti-Virtsu-Kuivastu-Kuressaare maantee; Risti-Virtsu-Kuivastu-Kuressaare highway) begins from Risti and branches off from the T9. The Risti-Virtsu-Kuivastu-Kuressaare highway is the only national route to include a ferry crossing (between Muhu island and Estonian mainland). The road passes through Lääne and Saare County. The highway ends in Kuressaare on the intersection of the T76, T77 and T10.

== Route ==
The total length of the road is 143.7 km. For its entire length, the road is 1+1. The Suur Väin Strait is crossed by a regular Virtsu-Kuivastu ferry, while Väike Väin Strait is crossed via a causeway Väinatamm. During winter an ice road connects Muhu with the mainland.

== See also ==
- Transport in Estonia
