= T87 =

T87 may refer to:

- Cooper T87, a British racing car
- Estonian national road 87
- Honeywell T87, a thermostat
- Tatra 87, a Czechoslovak luxury automobile
