= T22 =

T22 may refer to:

== Aircraft ==
- Avro Anson T 22, a British radio trainer
- Consolidated AT-22, a trainer of the United States Army Air Forces
- De Havilland Sea Vampire T.22, a British jet trainer
- Fokker T-22 Instructor, a trainer of the Brazilian Air Force
- Junkers T.22, a German prototype fighter
- Ryan PT-22 Recruit, a trainer of the United States Army Air Corps

== Rail and transit ==
- Baraki-nakayama Station, in Funabashi, Chiba, Japan
- Furutakamatsu-Minami Station, in Takamatsu, Kagawa, Japan
- Temmabashi Station, in Chūō-ku, Osaka, Japan

== Other uses ==
- T22 (rocket), an American rocket weapon
- Estonian national road 22
- T22 road (Tanzania)
- German torpedo boat T22
- T22 Armored Car, a prototype of the M8 Greyhound light armored car
- T22 Medium Tank, an American prototype tank
- ThinkPad T22, a notebook computer
- Type 22 frigate of the Royal Navy
