= Estonian national road 3 =

Road in Estonia

National Road 3
- Põhimaantee 3
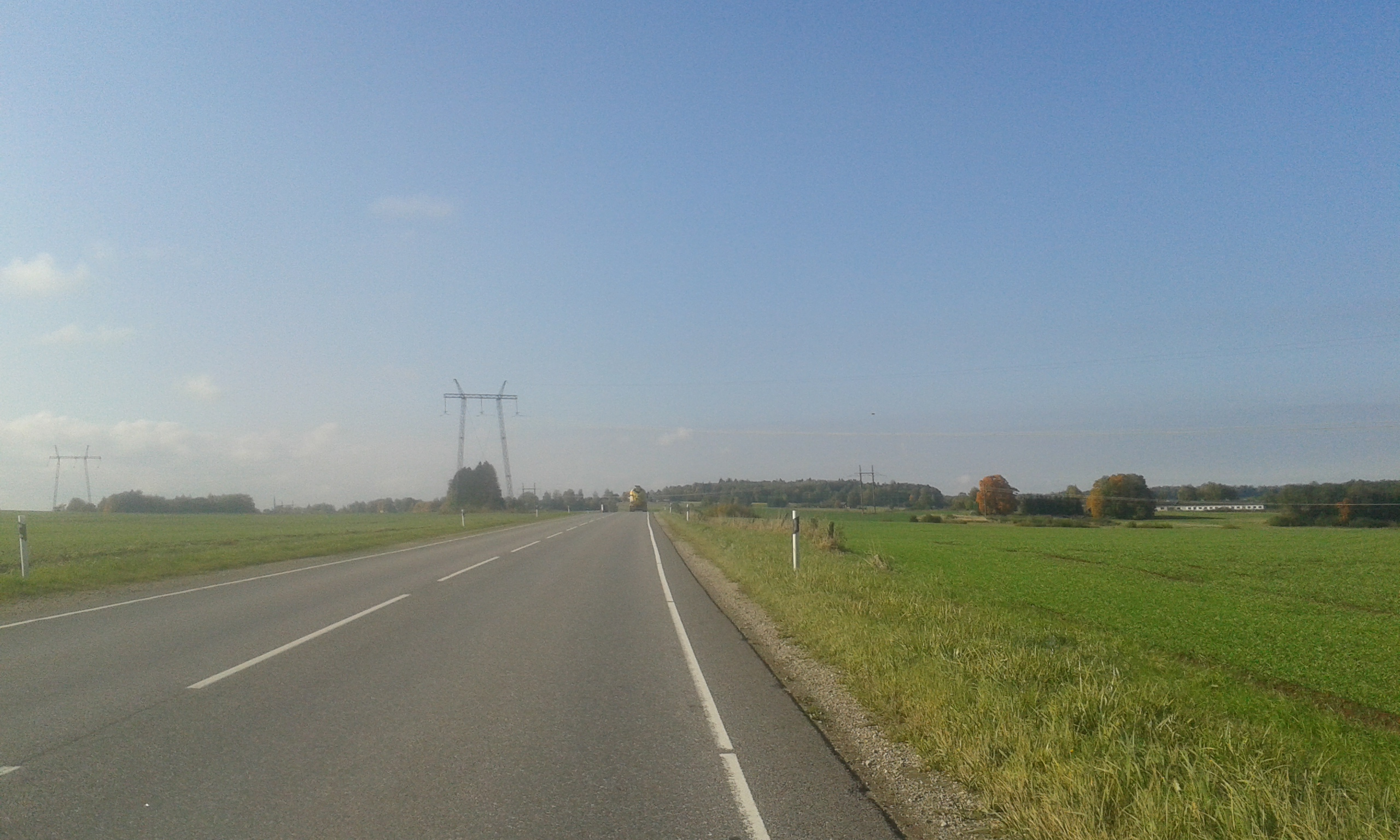

Route information
- Maintained by Estonian Road Administration
- Length: 220 km (140 mi)

Major junctions
- From: Jõhvi
- Jõhvi Tammiku; Tammiku; Mustvee; Omedu; Kobratu; Aovere; Kõrveküla; Tartu; Tartu; Tartu; Tartu; Rõngu; Rõngu; Kuigatsi; Tõlliste Valga
- To: Valga border with Latvia

Location
- Country: Estonia
- Counties: Ida-Viru County Jõgeva County; Tartu County Valga County

Highway system
- Transport in Estonia
← T2	→ T4

Põhimaantee 3 (officially abbreviated as T3) is a 220-kilometre-long north-south national main road in Estonia. The route follows the same path as the European route E264. The highway starts in Jõhvi. From there the main cities passed are Ahtme (administratively Kohtla-Järve) and Tartu. The highway ends in Valga on the intersection with the T6.

The road forms a major transport north–south transport route within Estonia, as it provides a direct connection between north-eastern Estonia and southern Estonia (Narva border crossing and Latvia) In 2015, the highest traffic volumes were around Jõhvi, with the AADT there being around 17,000. The figures rise again around Tartu, hovering around 10,000. The road is a 1+1 road for its entire length.

== Route description ==
The T3 (Estonian: põhimaantee 3) is a major north–south highway in Estonia connecting the capital of Ida-Viru County, Jõhvi, to southern Estonia and the Latvian border. The T3 is a part of the European route E264. The route runs through the counties of Ida-Virumaa, Jõgevamaa, Tartumaa and Valgamaa.

The road runs through Jõhvi, Tartu and Valga, bypassing only Elva. The route also runs through numerous villages, such as Rõngu. The highway begins in Jõhvi at the interchange with the T1 and runs through the city for 3.1 kilometres and through Ahtme for 2 kilometres. After city limits are crossed, the road runs in a southernly manner. At Rannapungerja, the road starts running parallel to Lake Peipus. The road bypasses Mustvee and shortly after, turns south, away from the Lake Peipus. The road runs straight until Tartu. The route runs straight through the middle of the city, where it crosses the Emajõgi and intersects with the T2 and T39.

After Tartu, the road continues in a southwest direction. The town of Elva is bypassed (here is also the only grade-separated interchange on the T3 (T3/T150)). Shortly after, the road runs through the village of Rõngu, intersecting with numerous support routes, such as the T52 and the T71. At Kuigatsi, the road intersects with the T69. Shortly after this, the road reaches Valga. The route mainly bypasses the town and ends at the T6 (which runs along the Latvian border).

Currently there are no speed cameras on the T3.

== Gallery ==
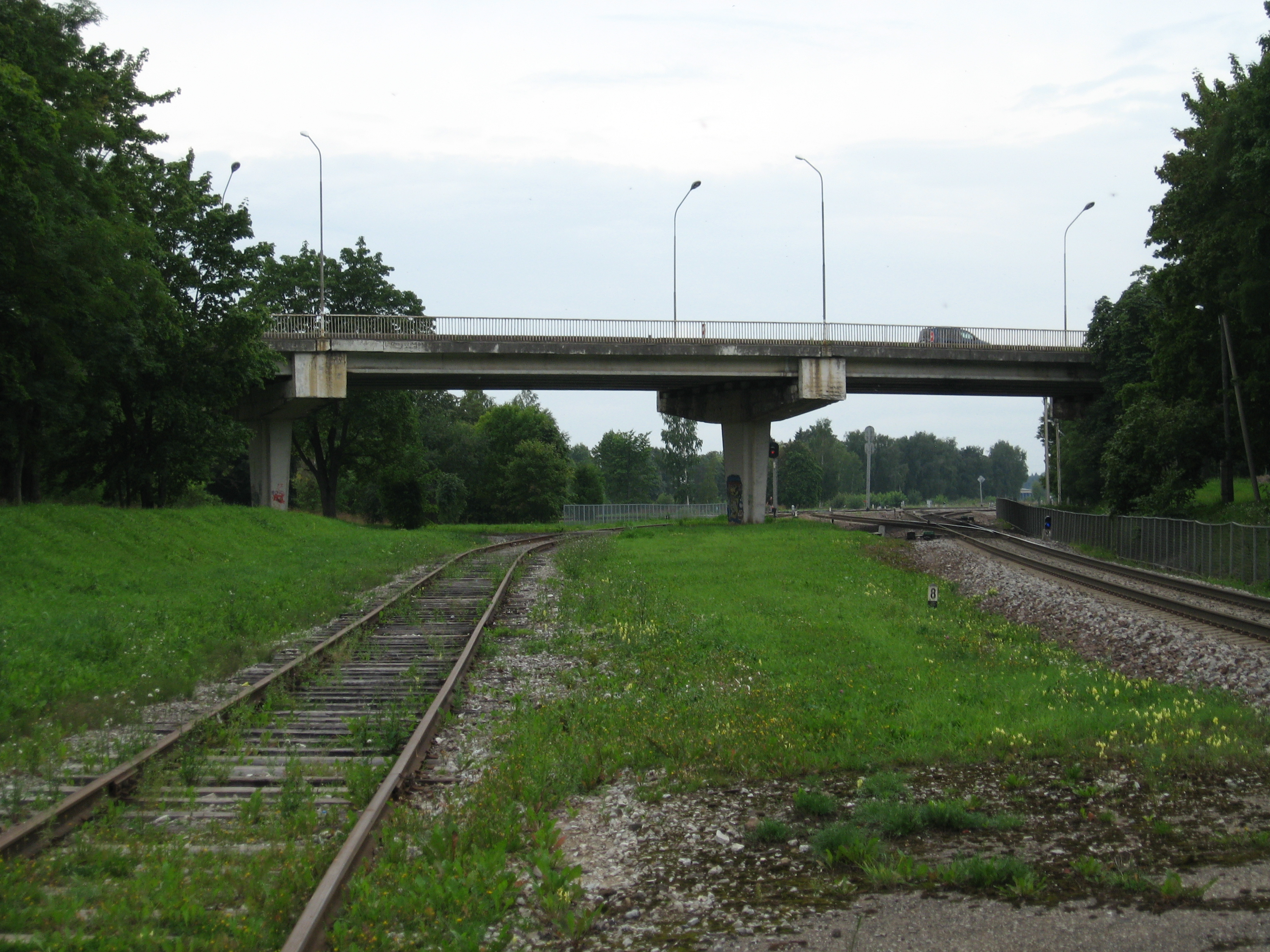
Viaduct in Jõhvi.

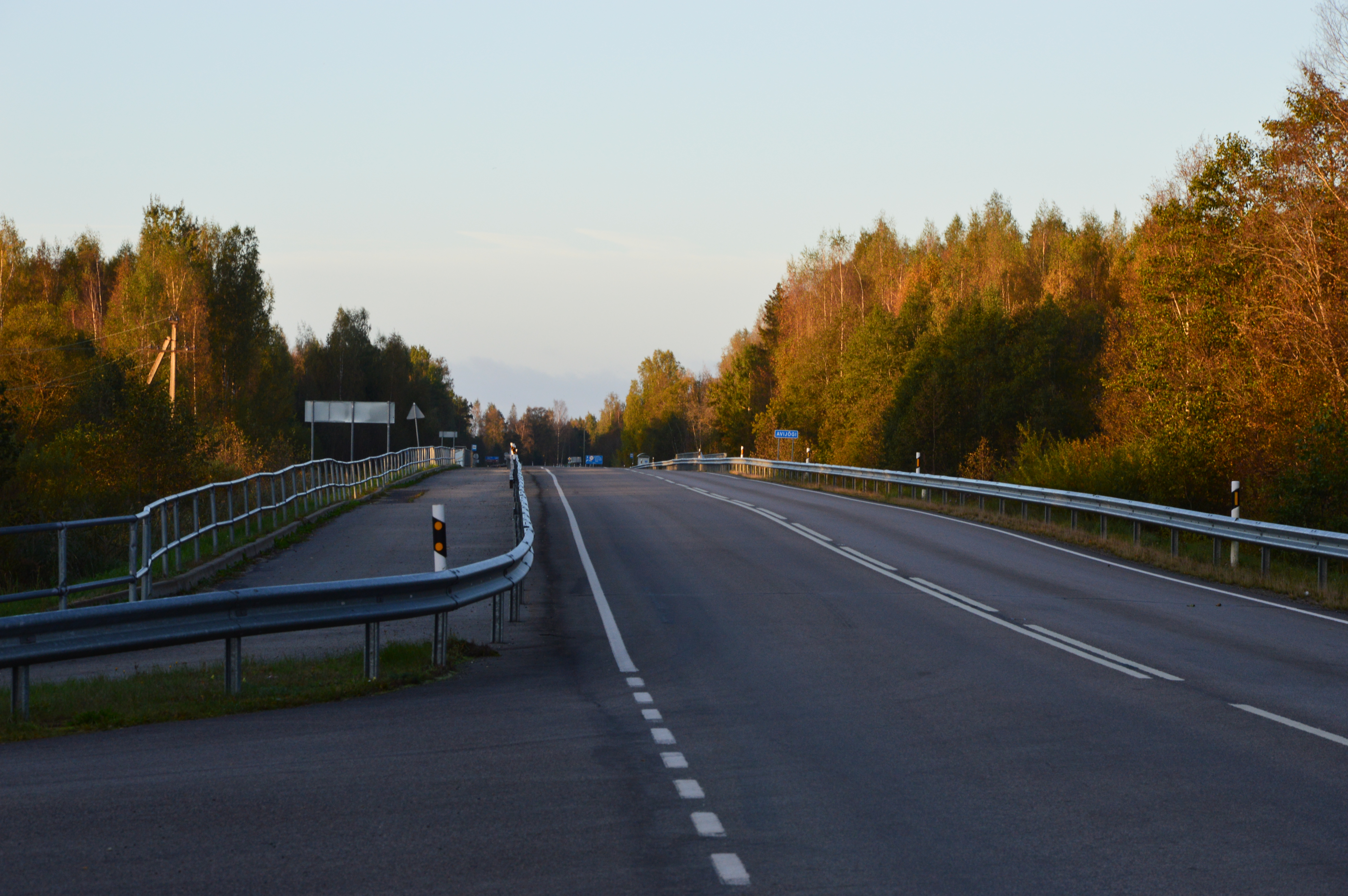
In Lohusuu.

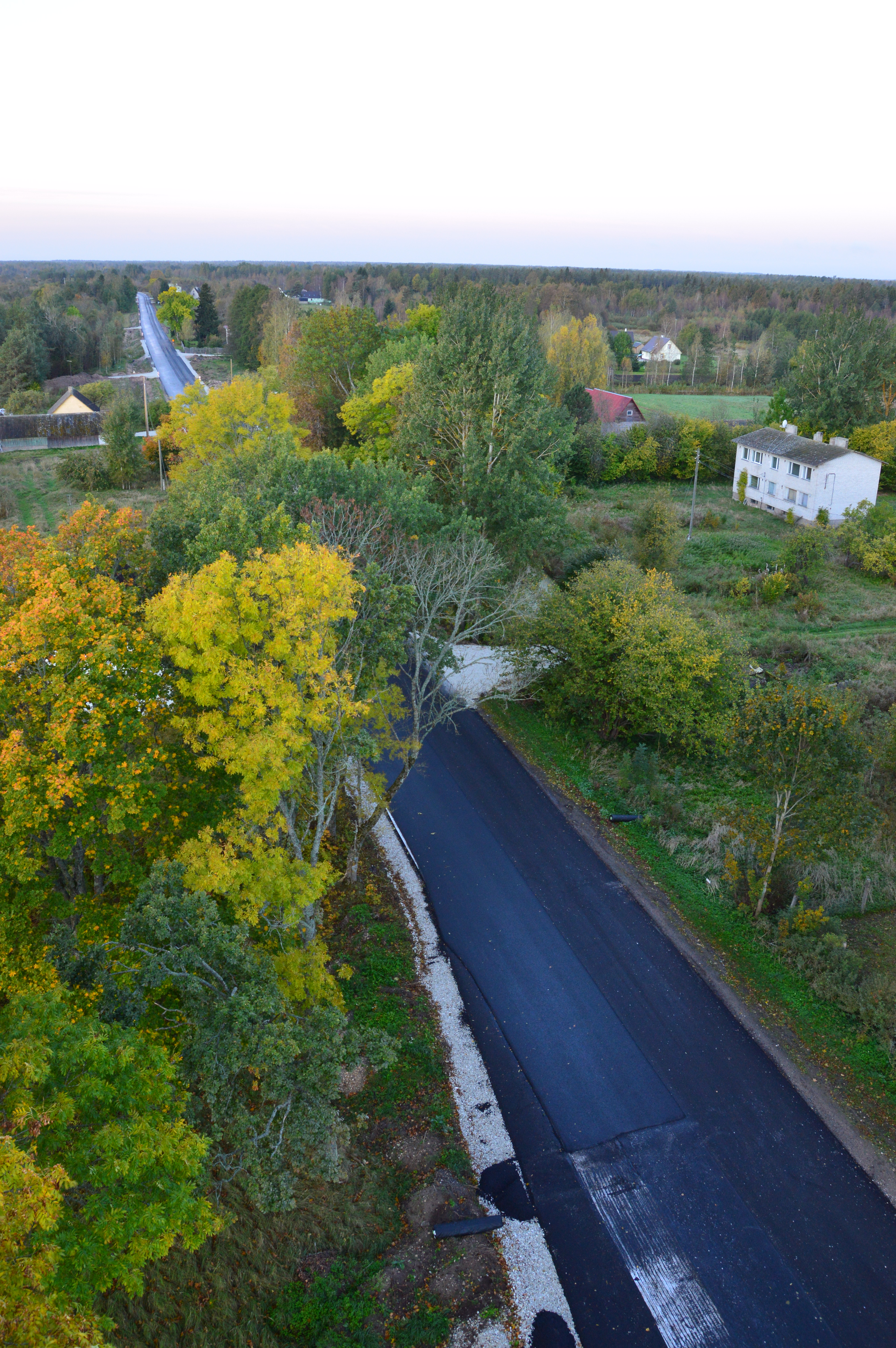
Road in Ninasi.

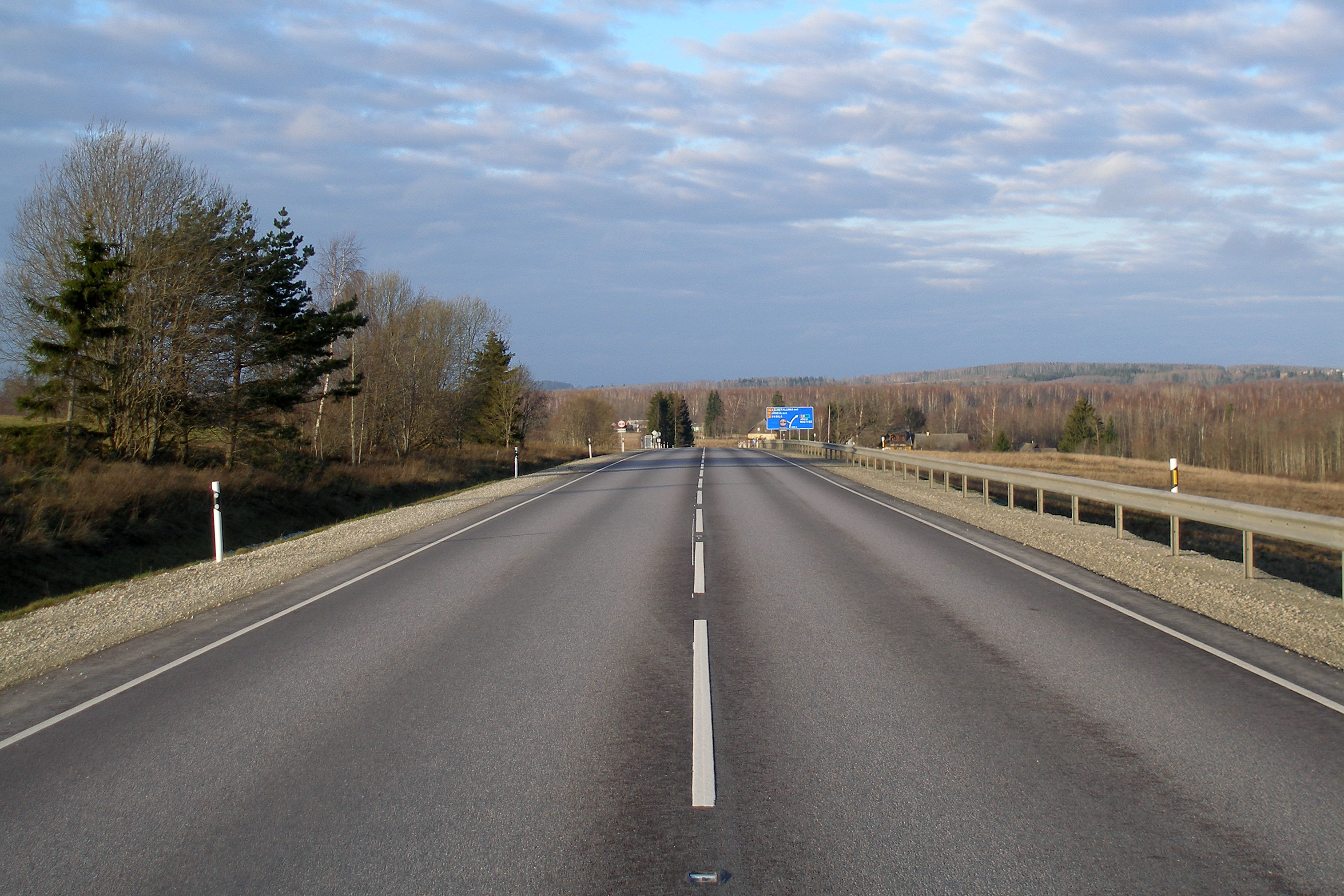
Near Aovere.

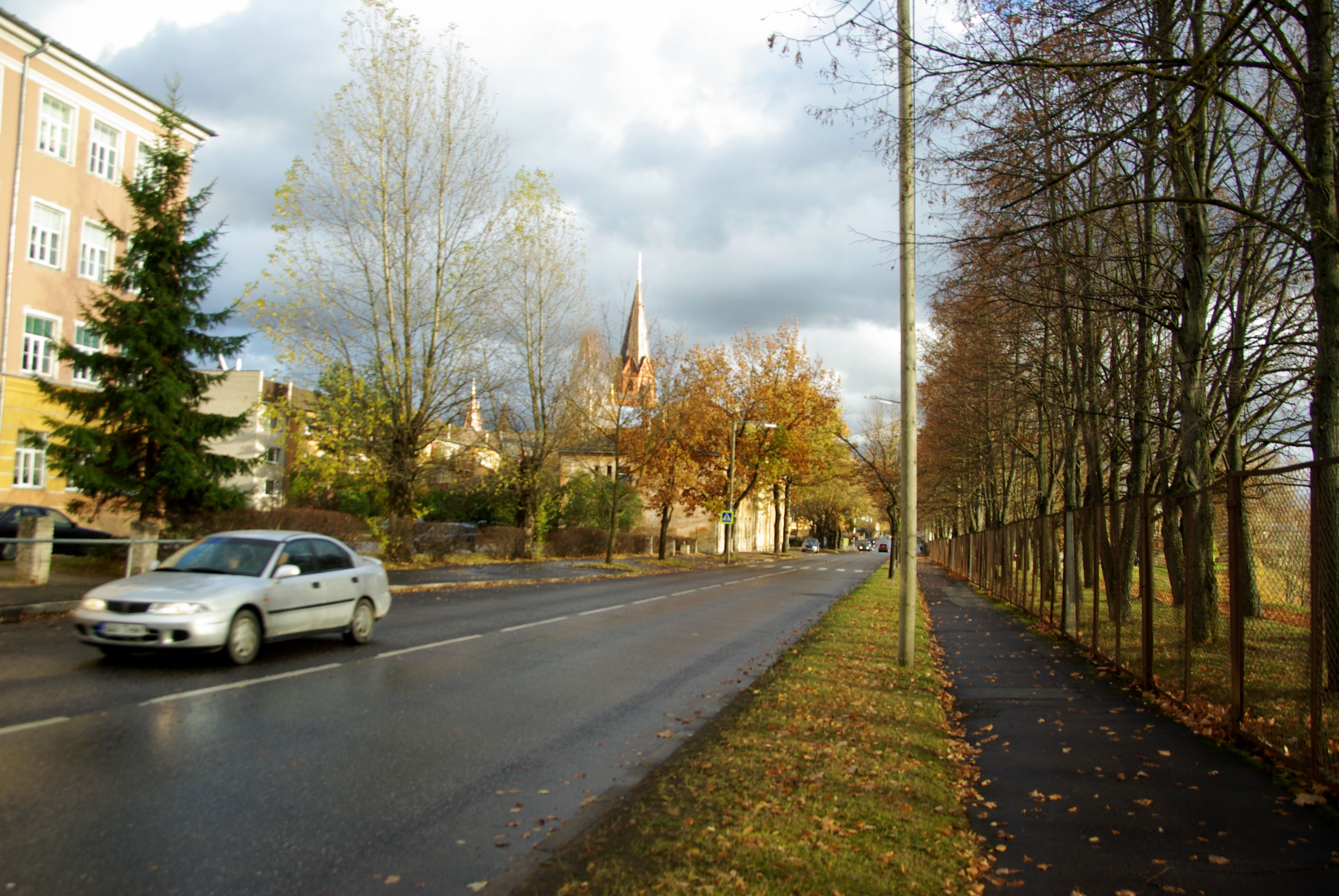
Puiestee street in Tartu.

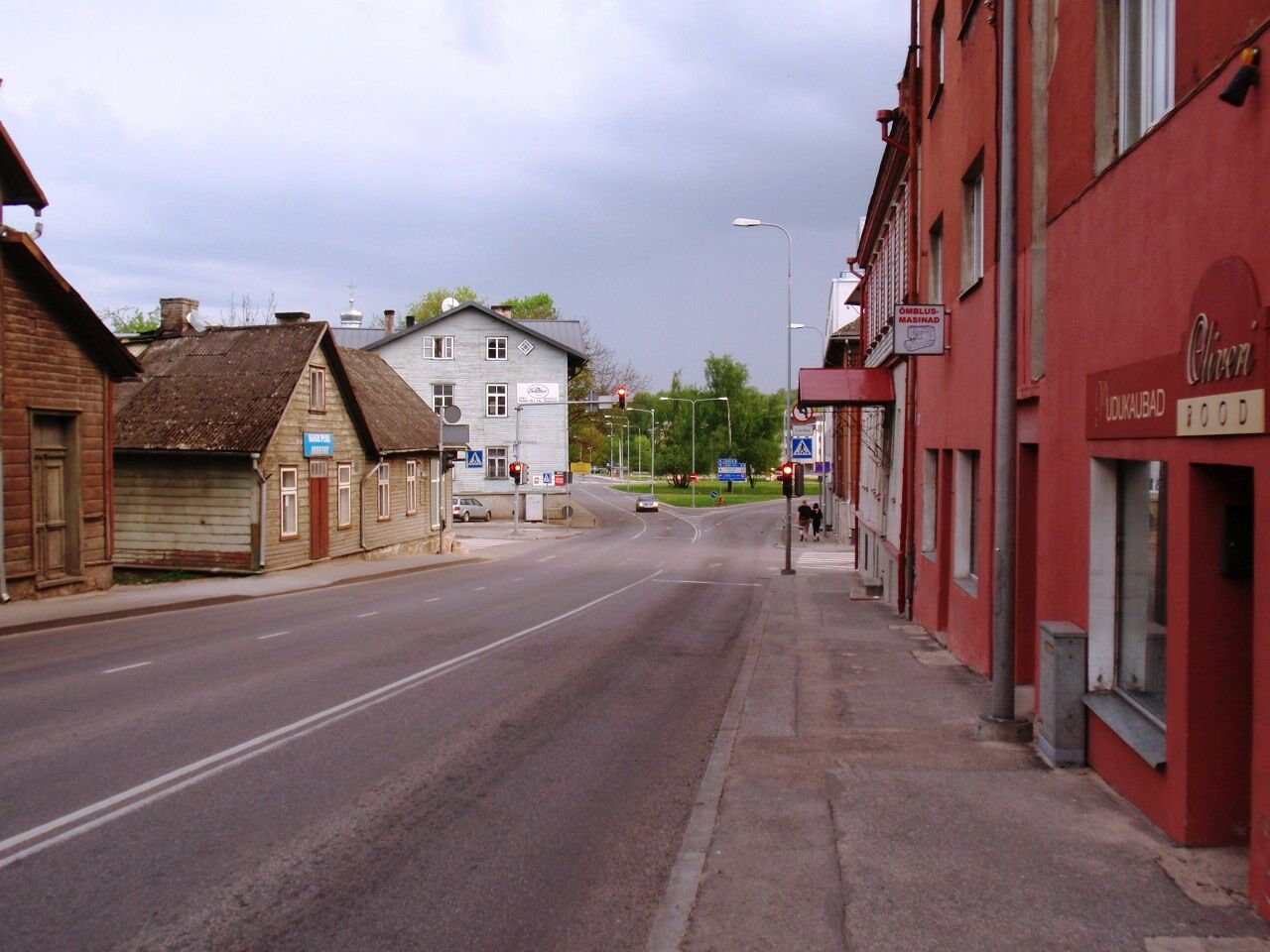
Narva road in Tartu.

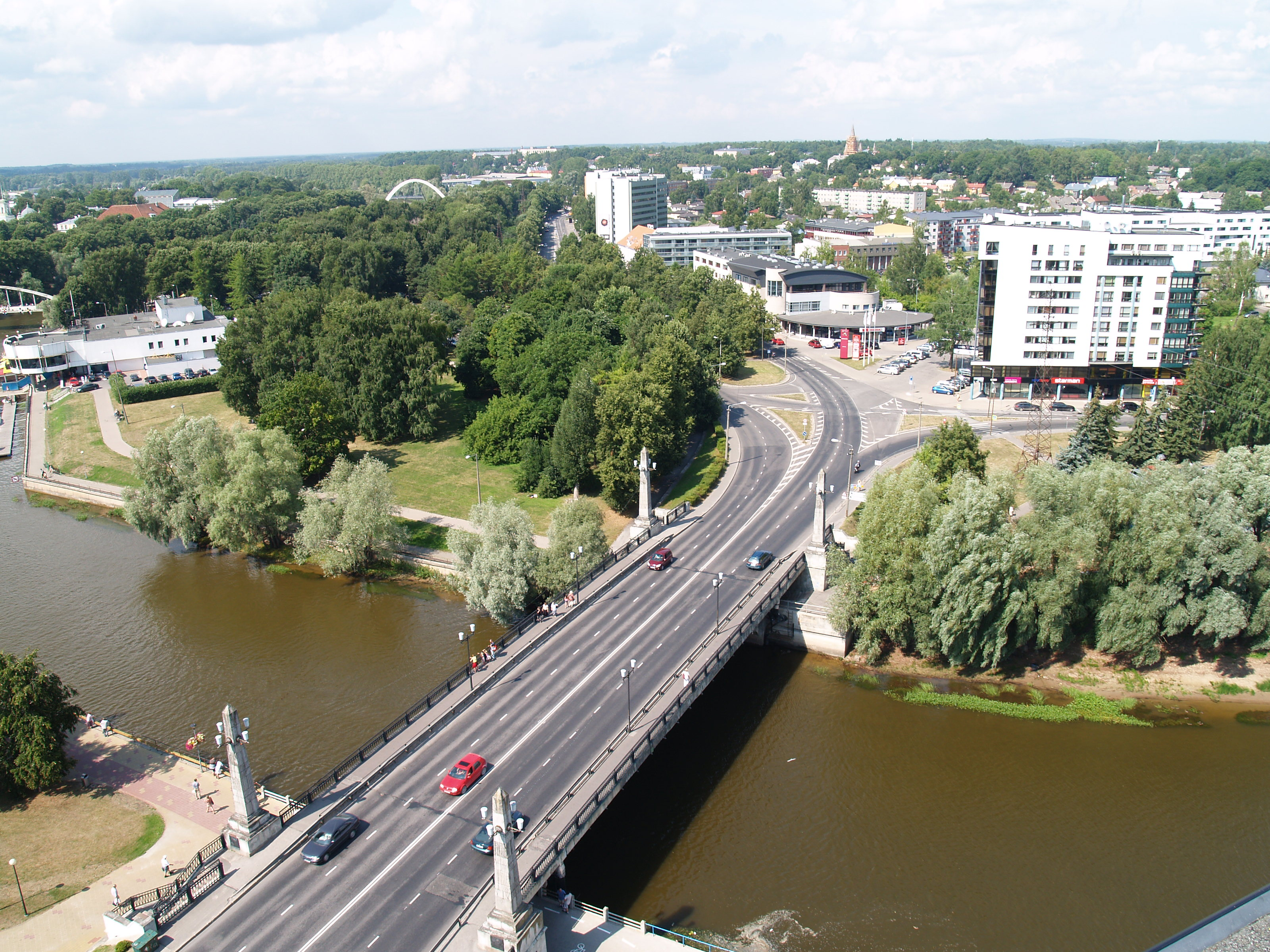
T3 crossing the Emajõgi in Tartu.

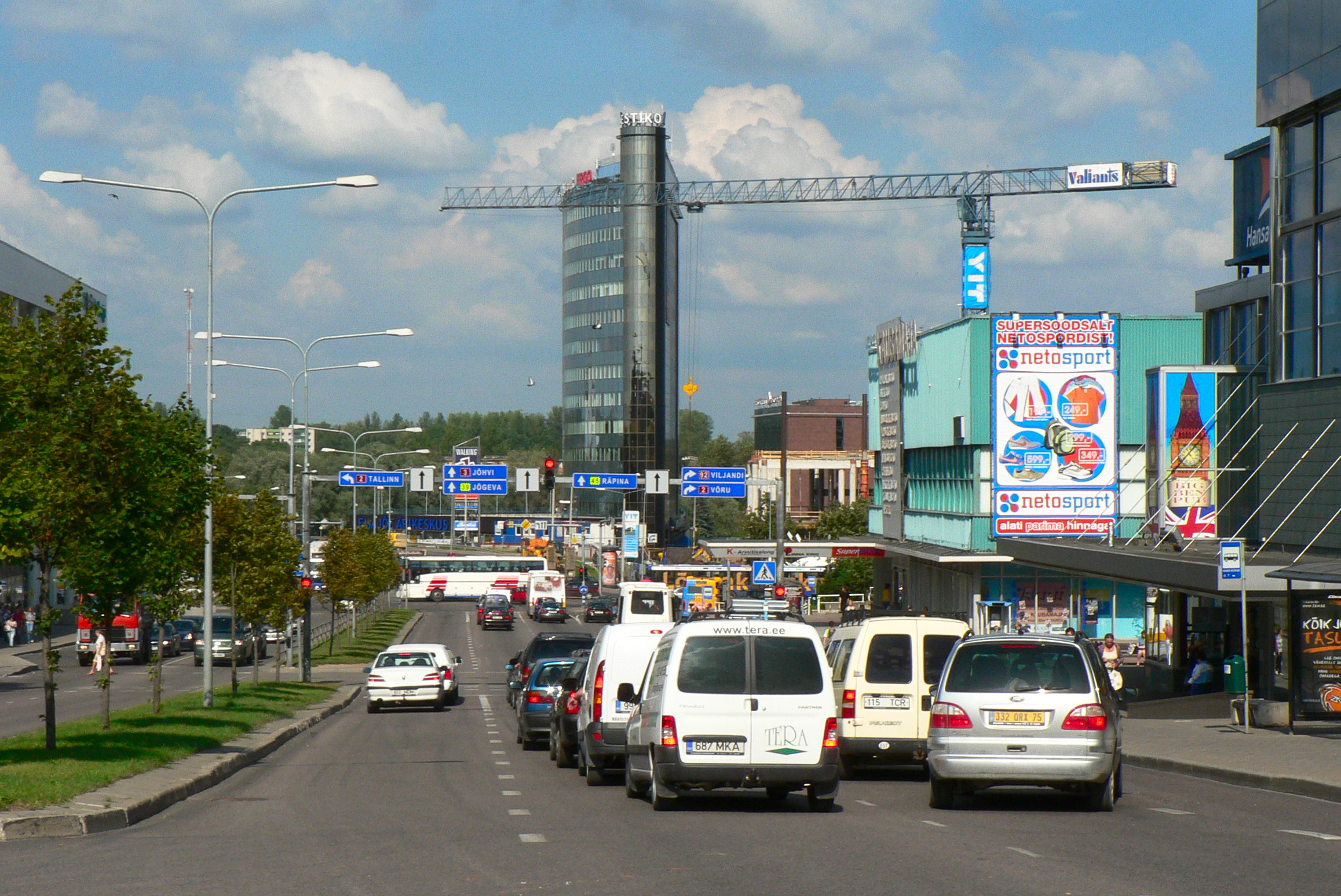
Riia street in Tartu.

== See also ==
- Highways in Estonia
- European route E264
