= Estonian national road 20 =

Road in Estonia

- Tugimaantee 20
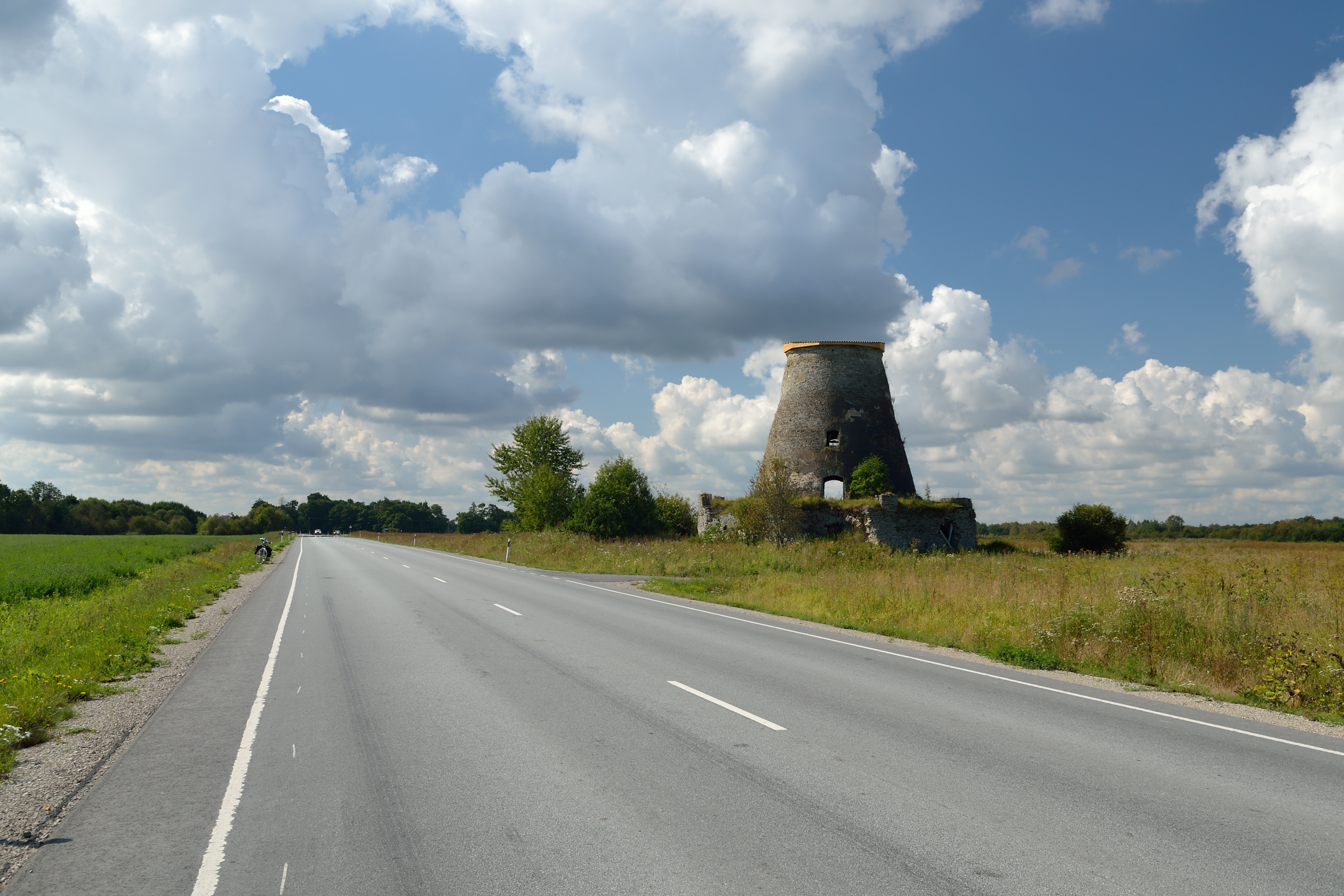

Route information
- Length: 28.3 km (17.6 mi)

Major junctions
- From: Põdruse ( T1)
- To: Võrkla ( T1)

Location
- Country: Estonia

Highway system
- Transport in Estonia
← T18	→ T21

Tugimaantee 20 (ofcl. abbr. T20), also called the Põdruse–Kunda–Pada highway (Estonian: Põdruse–Kunda–Pada maantee), is a 28.3-kilometre-long national basic road in northern Estonia. Located on the east and west sides of national road 1 in Lääne-Viru County, the highway begins at Põdruse and ends at Võrkla.

== See also ==
- Transport in Estonia
