= Estonian national road 17 =

Road in Estonia

- Tugimaantee 17

Route information
- Length: 68.8 km (42.8 mi)

Major junctions
- From: Keila ( T8)
- To: Haapsalu ( T9)

Location
- Country: Estonia

Highway system
- Transport in Estonia
← T15	→ T18

Tugimaantee 17 (ofcl. abbr. T17), also called the Keila–Haapsalu highway (Estonian: Keila–Haapsalu maantee), is a 68.8-kilometre-long national basic road in northwestern Estonia. The highway begins at Keila on national road 8 and ends at Haapsalu on national road 9.

== Route ==
T17 passes through the following counties and municipalities:

Harju County

- Keila
- Lääne-Harju Parish

Lääne County

- Lääne-Nigula Parish

== See also ==
- Transport in Estonia
