= Estonian national road 21 =

Road in Estonia

- Tugimaantee 21

Route information
- Length: 69.6 km (43.2 mi)

Major junctions
- From: Rakvere
- To: Mustvee ( T36)

Location
- Country: Estonia

Highway system
- Transport in Estonia
← T20	→ T22

Tugimaantee 21 (ofcl. abbr. T21), also called the Rakvere–Luige highway (Estonian: Rakvere–Luige maantee), is a 69.6-kilometre-long national basic road in northeastern Estonia. The highway runs from the center of the town of Rakvere to the west side of Mustvee at national road 36.

== See also ==
- Transport in Estonia
