= Väike Strait =

Strait in Estonia

Coordinates: 58°33′N 23°09′E

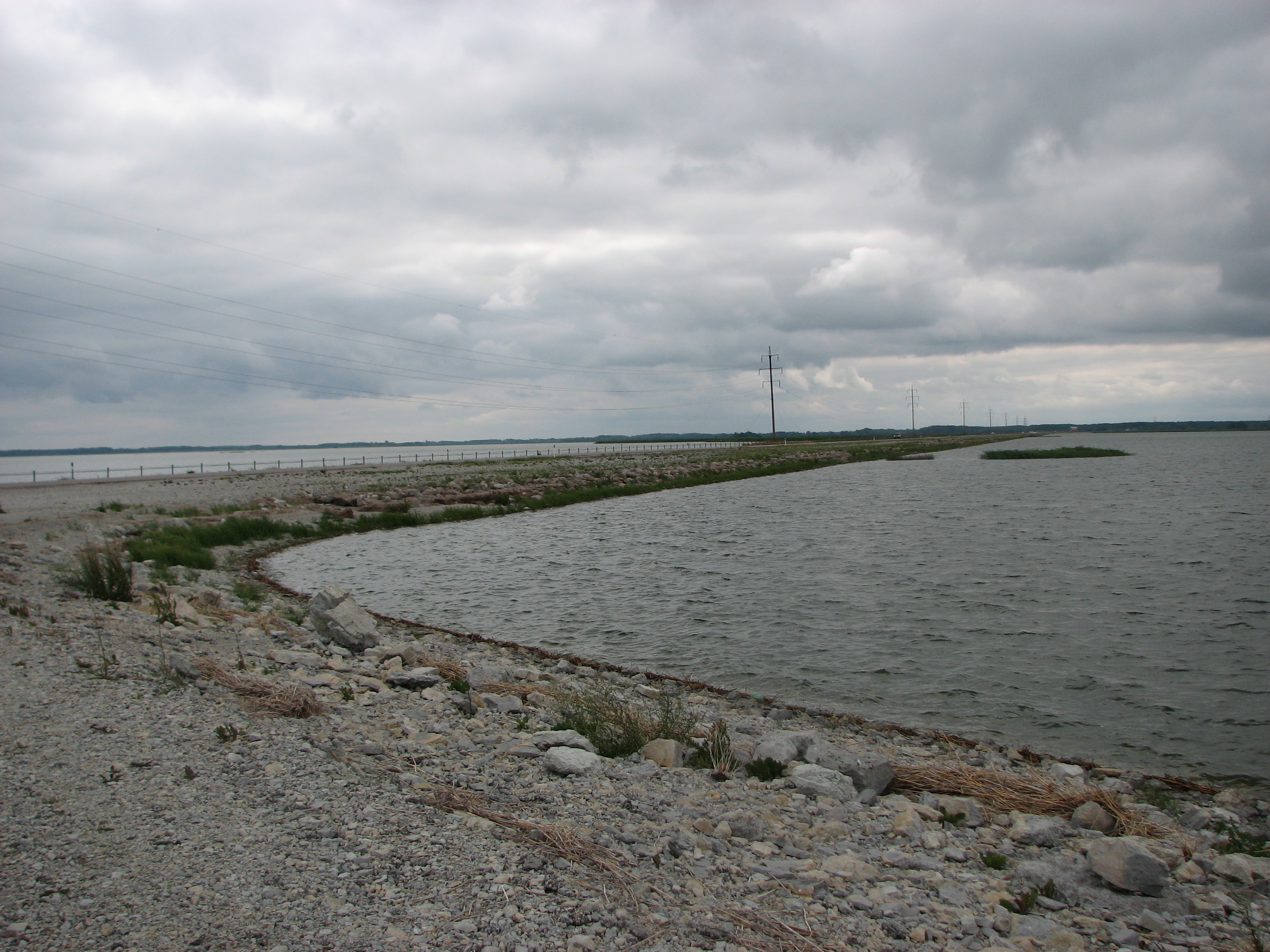
Väinatamm over the strait

Väike Strait (Estonian: Väike väin) is a strait in Estonia, between the Baltic Sea islands of Muhu and Saaremaa. The strait is part of Väinameri and is characterized by lots of islets and shoals. The strait is two to four kilometres wide and generally less than three metres deep.

The Väinatamm causeway crosses the strait and provides a road between the islands.

== See also ==
- Suur Strait
