= Estonian national road 14 =

Road in Estonia

- Tugimaantee 14
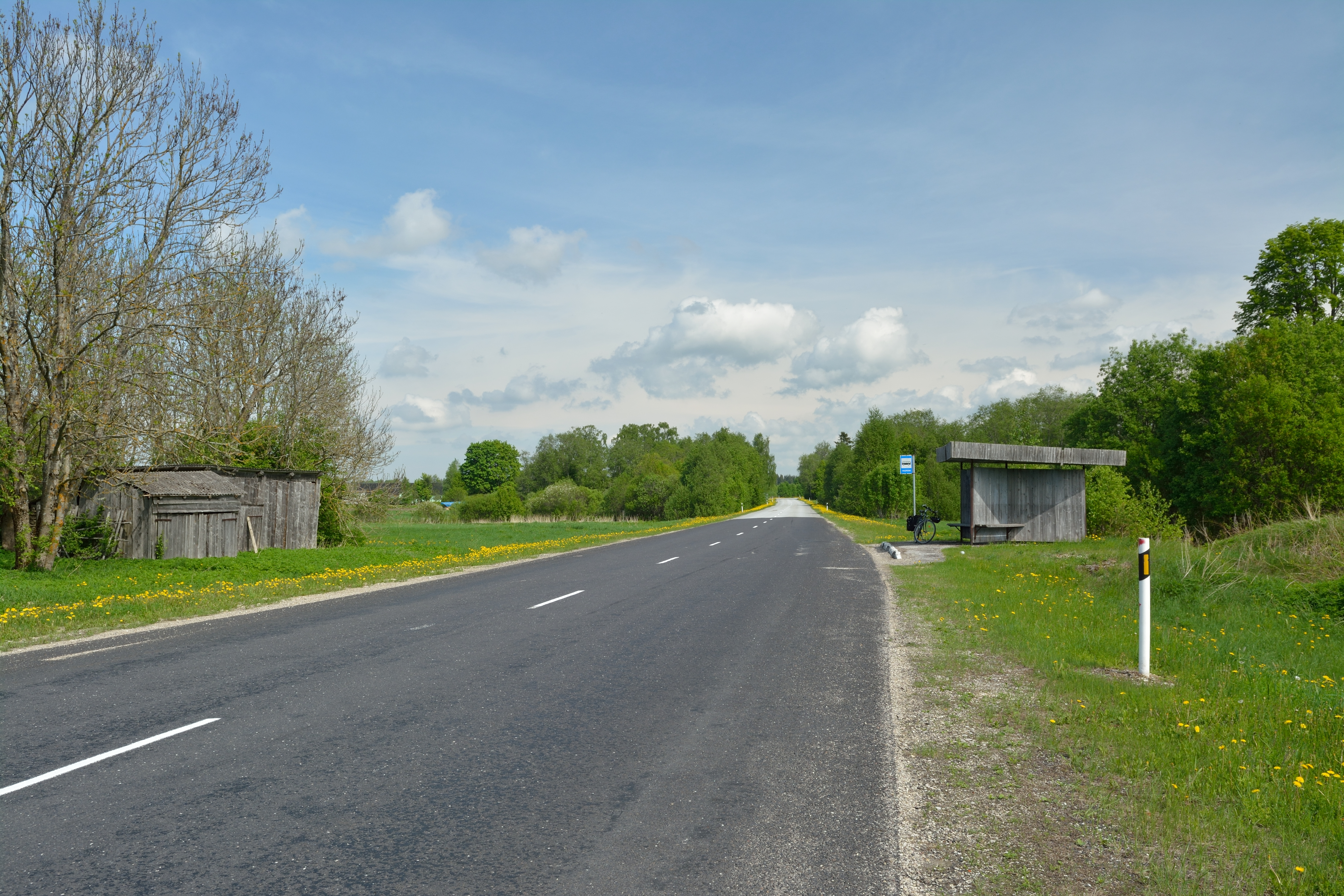

Route information
- Length: 39.1 km (24.3 mi)

Major junctions
- From: Kose ( T12)
- To: Purila ( T15)

Location
- Country: Estonia

Highway system
- Transport in Estonia
← T13	→ T15

Tugimaantee 14 (ofcl. abbr. T14), also called the Kose–Purila highway (Estonian: Kose–Purila maantee), is a 39.1-kilometre-long national basic road in central Estonia. The highway begins at Kose on national road 12 and ends at Purila on national road 15.

== Route ==
T14 passes through the following counties and municipalities:

Harju County

- Kose Parish

Rapla County

- Rapla Parish

== See also ==
- Transport in Estonia
