= Estonian national road 22 =

Road in Estonia

- Tugimaantee 22

Route information
- Length: 52 km (32 mi)

Major junctions
- From: Rakvere ( T5)
- To: Koluvere ( T39)

Location
- Country: Estonia

Highway system
- Transport in Estonia
← T21	→ T23

Tugimaantee 22 (ofcl. abbr. T22), also called the Rakvere–Väike-Maarja–Vägeva highway (Estonian: Rakvere–Väike-Maarja–Vägeva maantee), is a 52-kilometre-long national basic road in northwestern Estonia. The highway begins at central Rakvere on national road 5 and ends at Koluvere on national road 39.

== See also ==
- Transport in Estonia
