= Suur Strait =

Strait in Estonia

Coordinates: 58°36′N 23°27′E

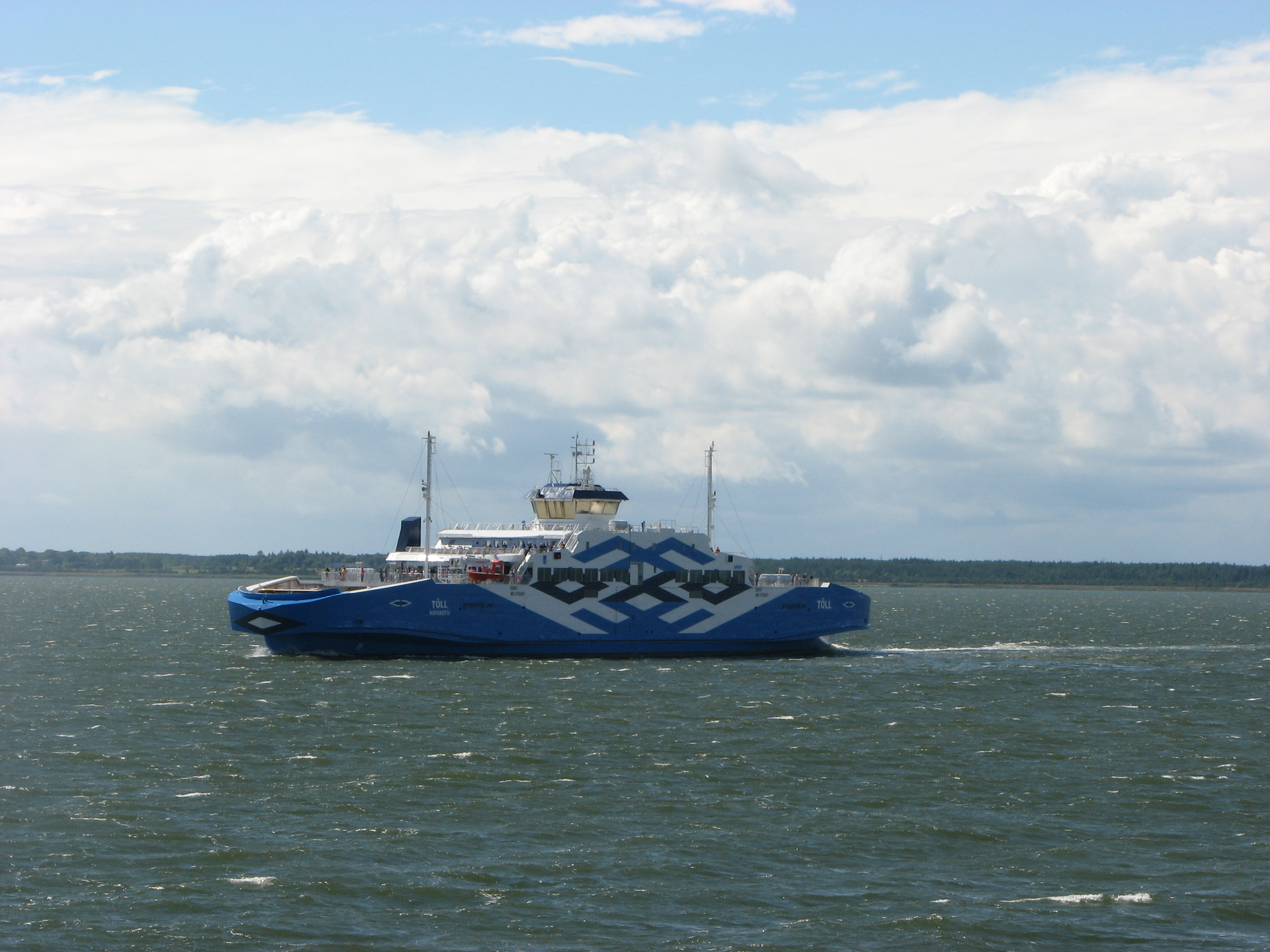
Virtsu–Kuivastu ferry in the strait

Suur Strait (Estonian: Suur väin) is a strait in Estonia, it is located between Muhu and the Estonian mainland. The strait (being itself part of Väinameri) connects Väinameri and Gulf of Riga.

Several islets are located in the strait: e.g. Papirahu, Kesselaid, Kõbajad, Viirelaid.

The strait maximum depth of 24 m is the deepest point in Väinameri.

Kuivastu Harbour is located at the strait. A ferry crosses the strait from Virtsu to Kuivastu.

Between 2020 and 2023, the Estonian Ministry of Economic Affairs assessed the possibility of building either a bridge or tunnel across the Suur Strait.

== See also ==
- Väike Strait
