= Purila Manor =

Manor in Estonia

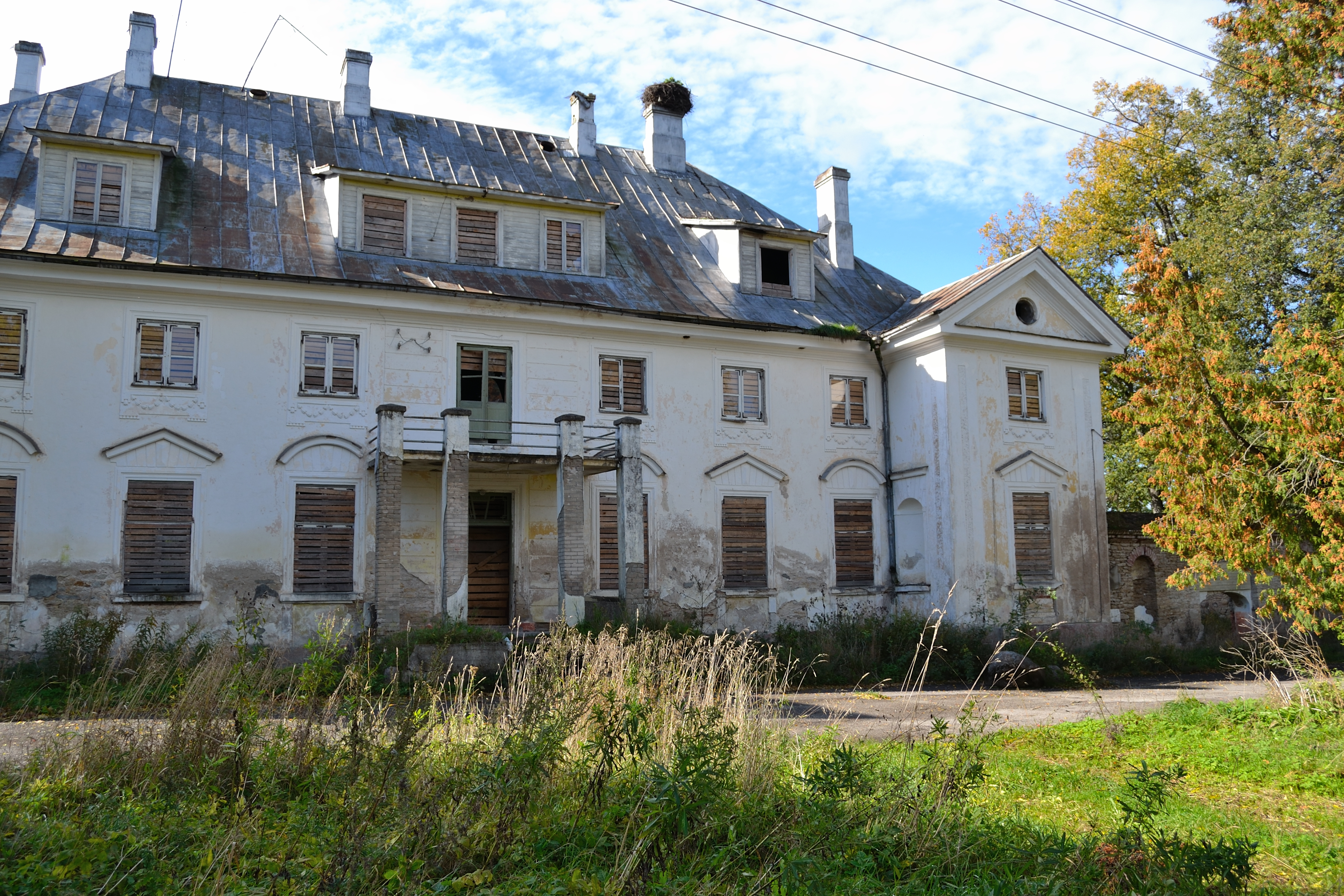
- The manor today

- Location within Estonia

General information
- Location: Purila, Aia tee, Rapla vald, 79633, Estonia, Estonia
- Coordinates: 59.084195°N 24.83356°E
- Completed: 1810
- Renovated: 1930s

Technical details
- Floor count: 2

The original Purila Manor (Estonian: Purila mõis, German: Purgel) was first mentioned in 1513. It was built in Purila, Rapla County and was rebuilt in 1810. It was used by Estonian aristocracy, including Friedrich Gustav von Helffreich, until the 20th century when it was used for education. After World War II it was used by the Soviet Army, including the 8th Estonian Rifle Corps from 1953 to 1957.

== Gallery ==
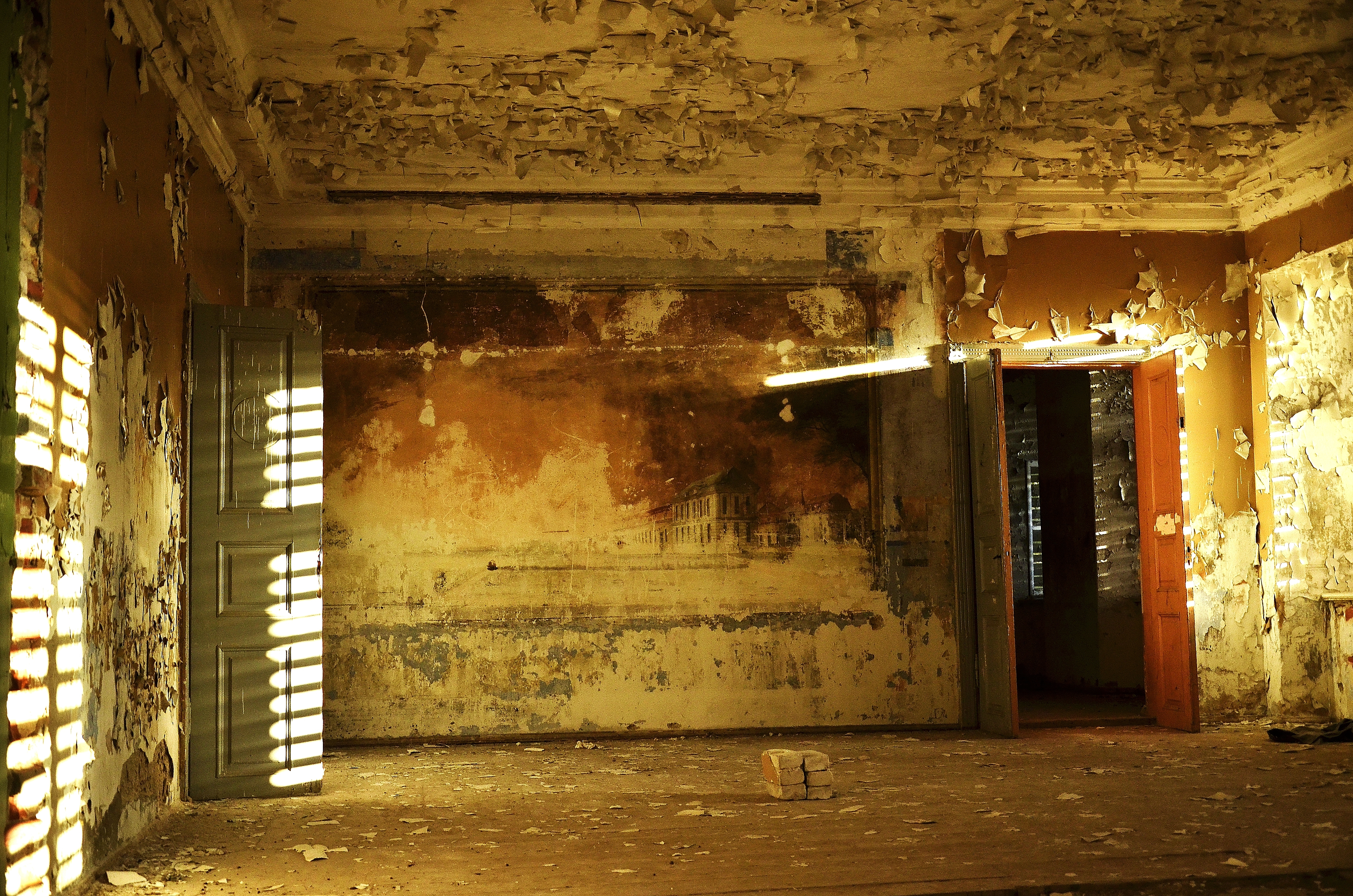
Friedrich Gustav von Helffreichi had a mural of his house in Tallinn

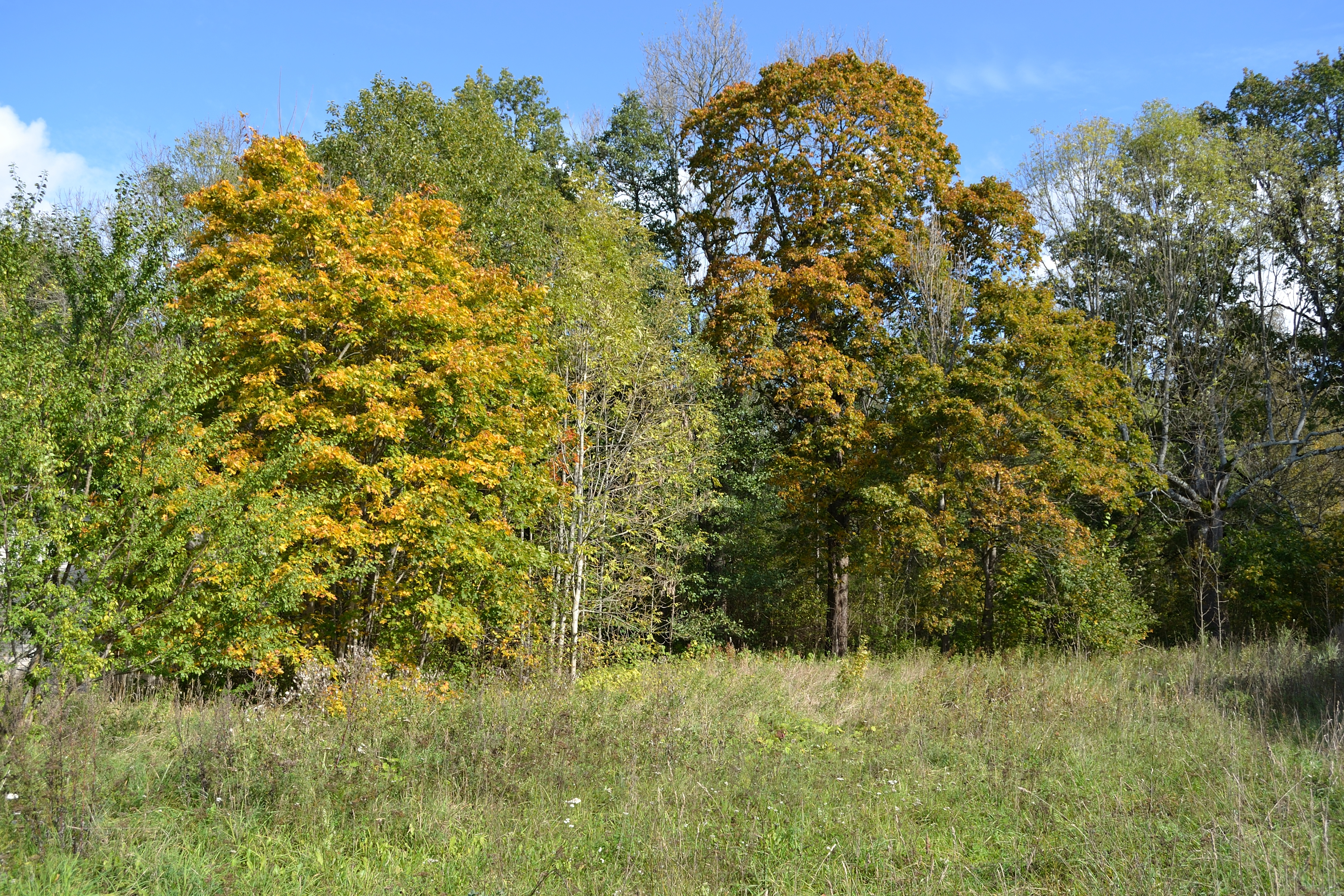
Park land
