= Rannapungerja =

Village in Estonia

Coordinates: 58°59′N 27°10′E

- Village
- Interactive map of Rannapungerja
- Country: Estonia
- County: Ida-Viru County
- Parish: Alutaguse Parish
- Time zone: UTC+2 (EET)
  - Summer (DST): UTC+3 (EEST)

Drone video of Rannapungerja lighthouse

Rannapungerja (German: Rannapungern) is a village in Alutaguse Parish, Ida-Viru County in northeastern Estonia.

== Gallery ==
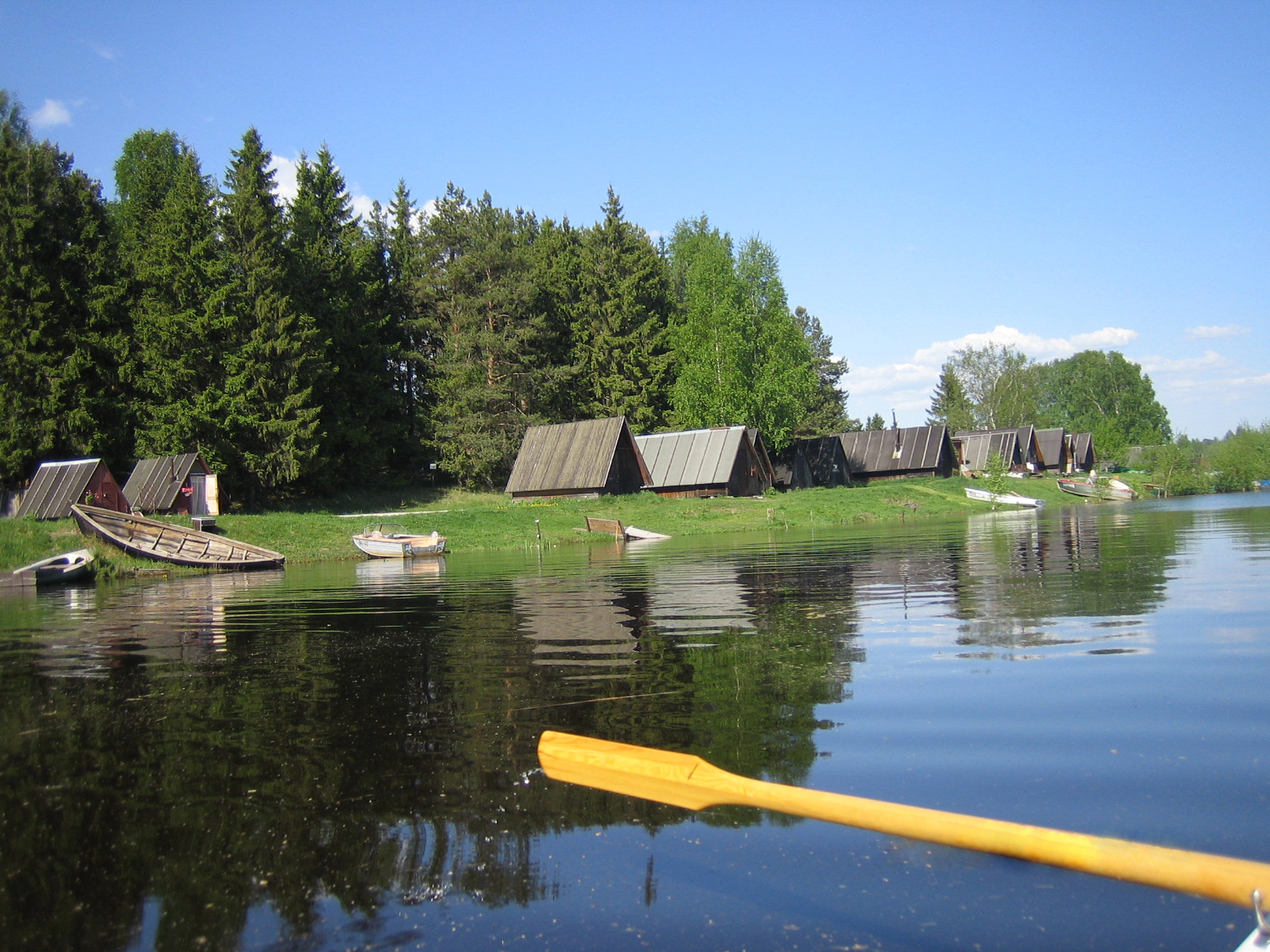
Boathouses in village.

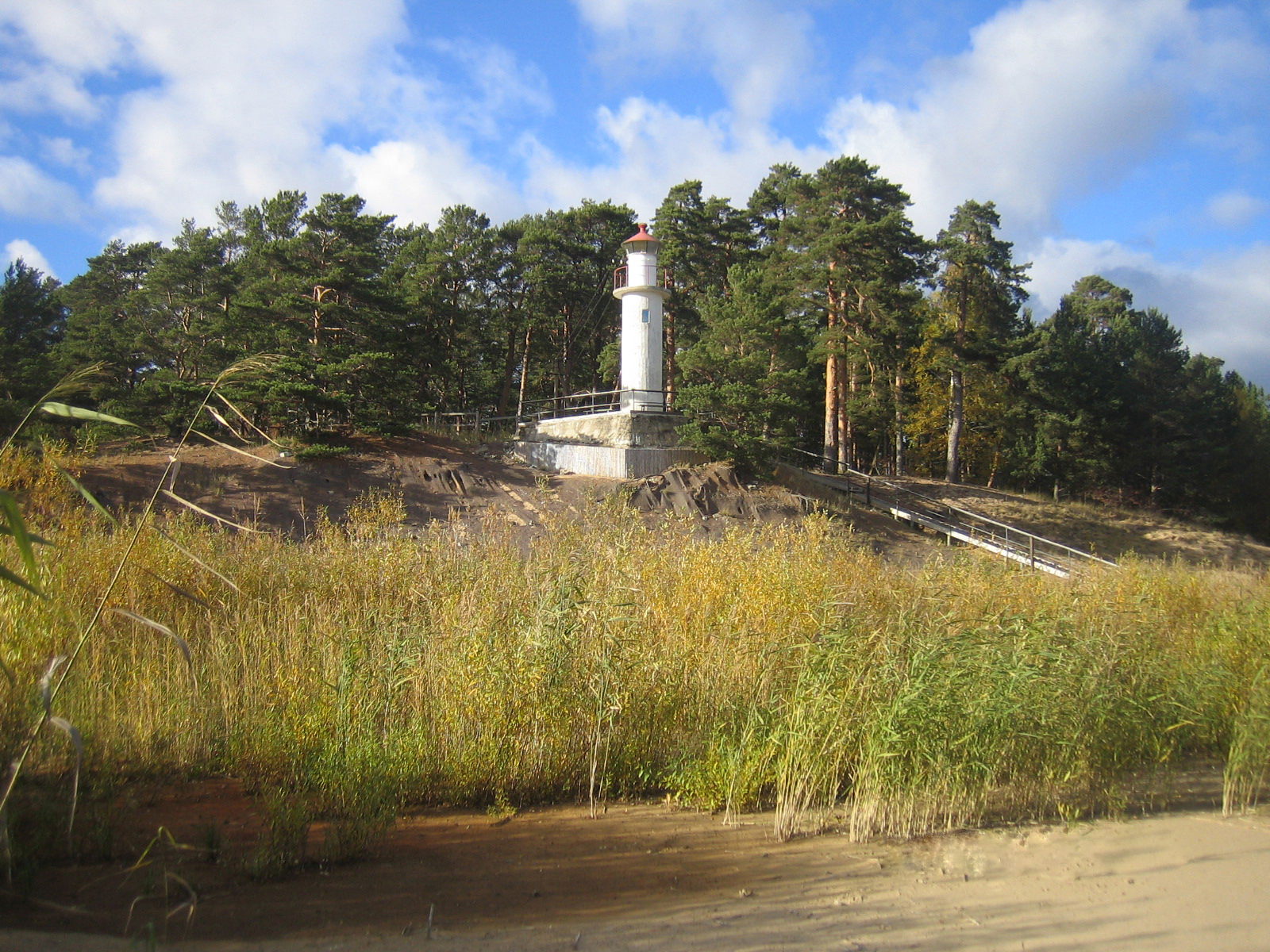
Rannapungerja lighthouse

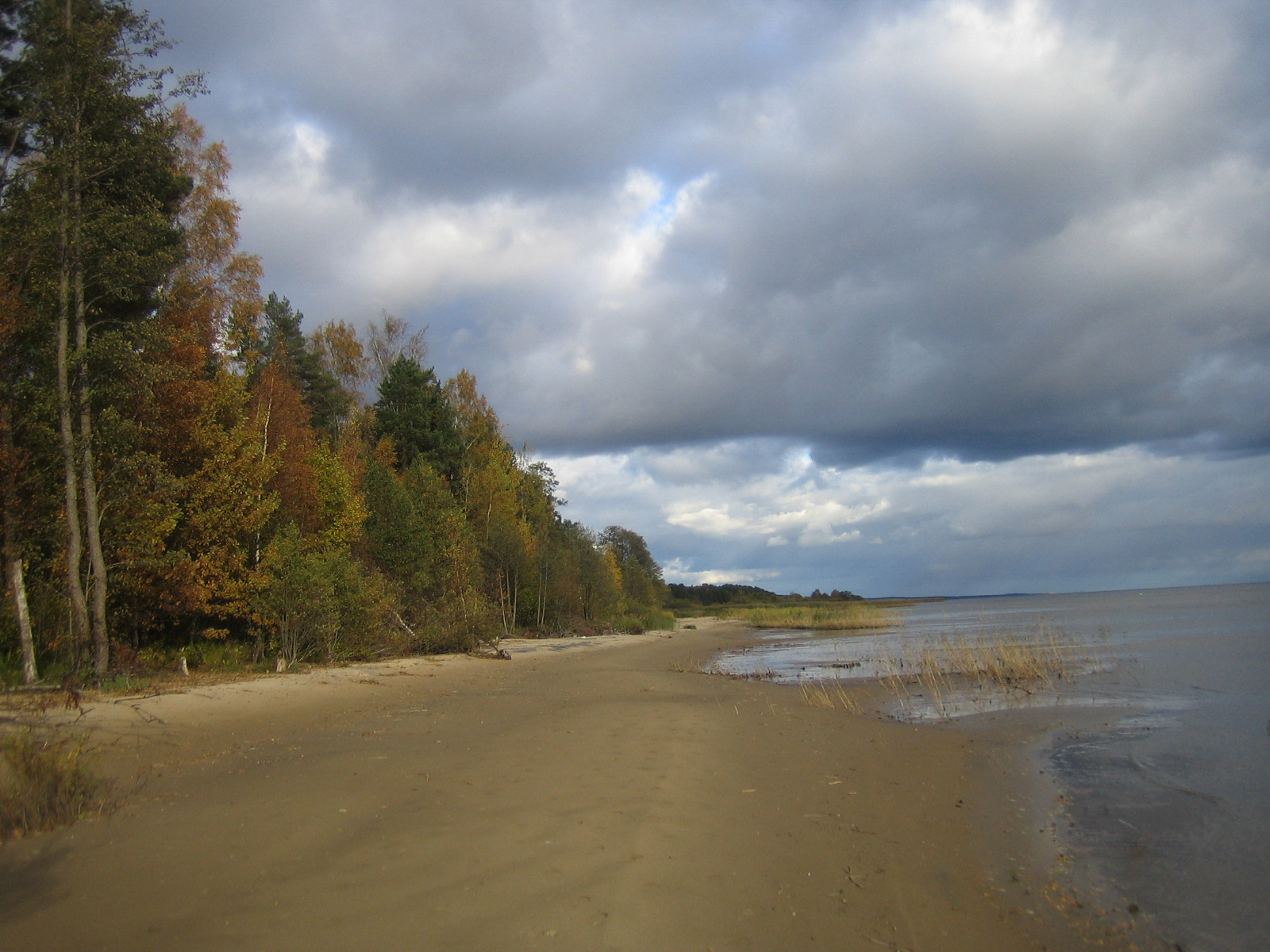
The beach by the Lake Peipus in Rannapungerja.

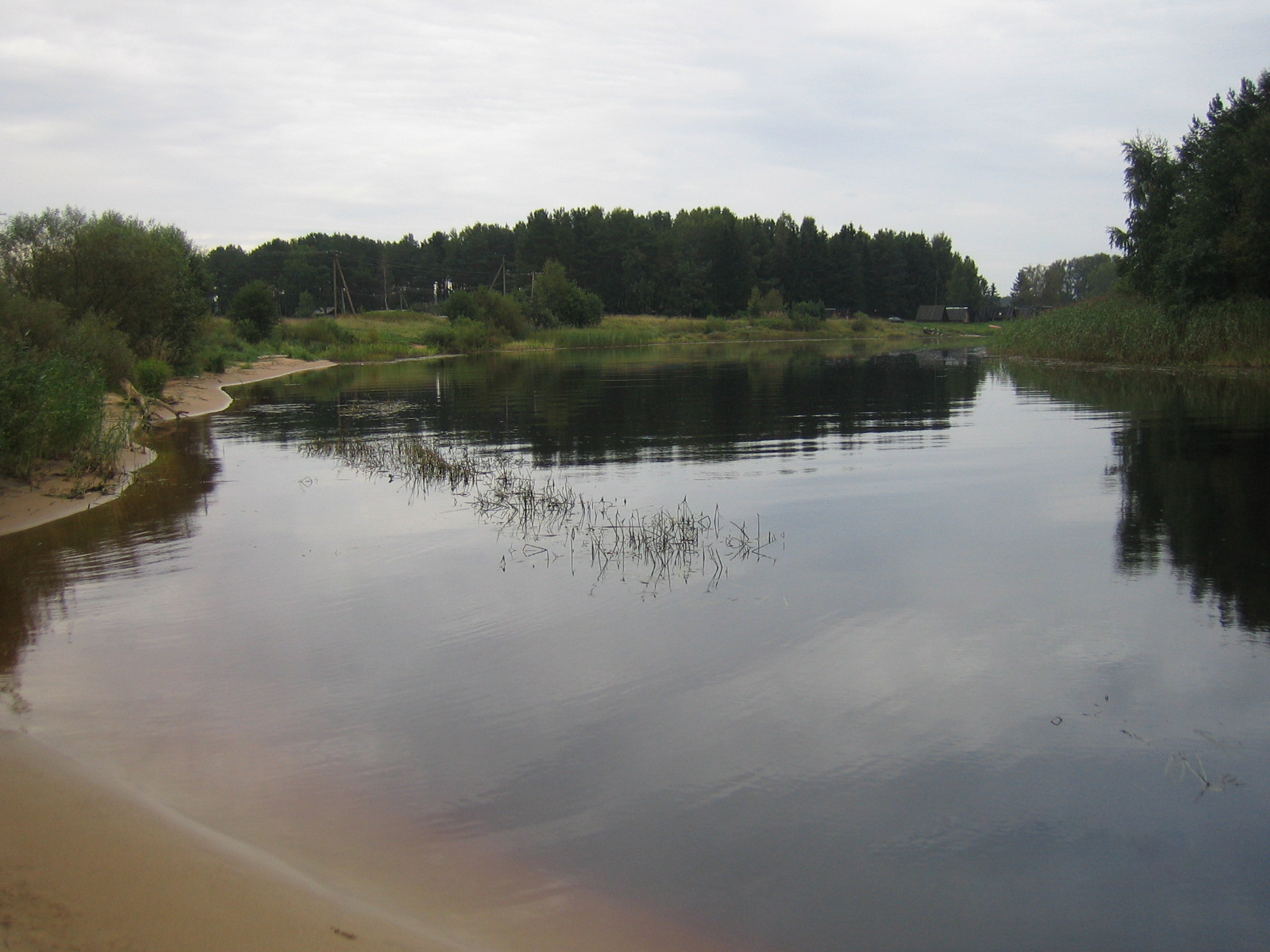
Rannapungerja River
