= Väinatamm =

Causeway in Estonia

Coordinates: 58°33′35″N 23°09′07″E

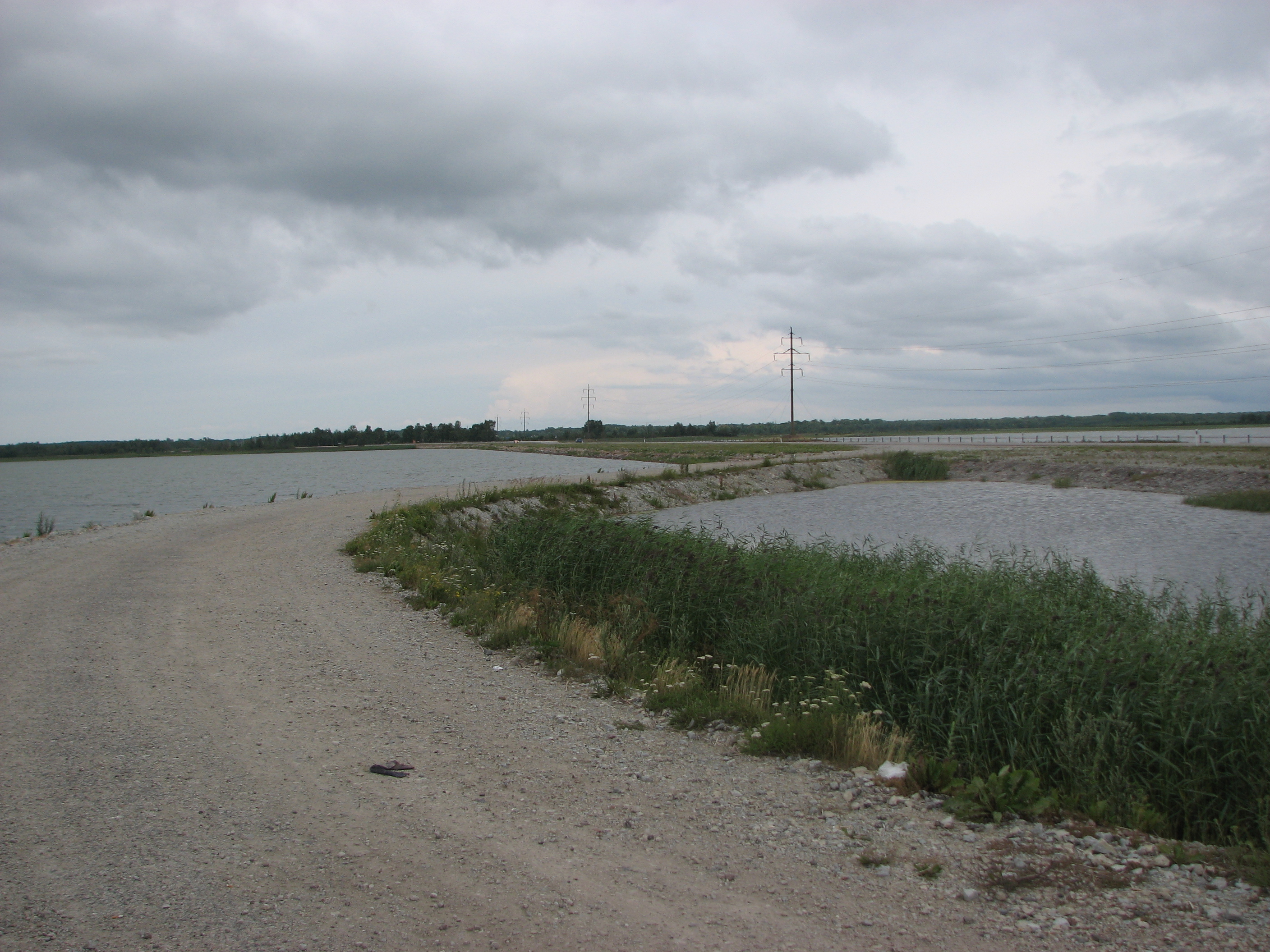
Causeway of Väike Väin Straits

Väinatamm is the name of the largest causeway in Estonia on the Estonian national road 10. The causeway, opened in 1896, connects the island of Muhu, located between Saaremaa and the mainland, with Saaremaa. Construction of the causeway cut the sea crossing between the continent and Saaremaa by about half, and transit time even further. In 1917, the causeway was the site of heavy fighting during Operation Albion, as German bicycle troops attempted to cut off and encircle retreating Russian forces, while securing the route to Muhu.

As of 2022, it was planned to create openings in the causeway to improve the deteriorating environmental situation in the Väike Strait.
