= Estonian national road 39 =

Road in Estonia

- Tugimaantee 39

Route information
- Length: 108 km (67 mi)

Major junctions
- From: Tartu ( T3)
- To: Aravete ( T5)

Location
- Country: Estonia

Highway system
- Transport in Estonia
← T38	→ T40

Tugimaantee 39 (ofcl. abbr. T39), also called the Tartu–Jõgeva–Aravete highway (Estonian: Tartu–Jõgeva–Aravete maantee), is a 108-kilometre-long national basic road in central Estonia. The highway begins at Tartu on national road 3 and ends at Aravete on national road 5.

== See also ==
- Transport in Estonia
