= Estonian national road 76 =

Road in Estonia

- Tugimaantee 76

Route information
- Length: 13.5 km (8.4 mi)

Major junctions
- From: Kuressaare
- To: Nasva

Location
- Country: Estonia

Highway system
- Transport in Estonia
← T75	→ T77

Tugimaantee 76 (ofcl. abbr. T76), also called the Kuressaare ring road (Estonian: Kuressaare ringtee), is the ring road of Kuressaare. The road starts on the southwest side of Kuressaare from the small borough of Nasva on national road 77 and ends on the south side of the town at the Roomassaare Harbour. The length of the road is 13.5 kilometers.

T76 runs all the way through Saaremaa Municipality.

== See also ==
- Transport in Estonia
