= Purila =

Village in Estonia

Coordinates: 59°05′02″N 24°49′50″E

- Village
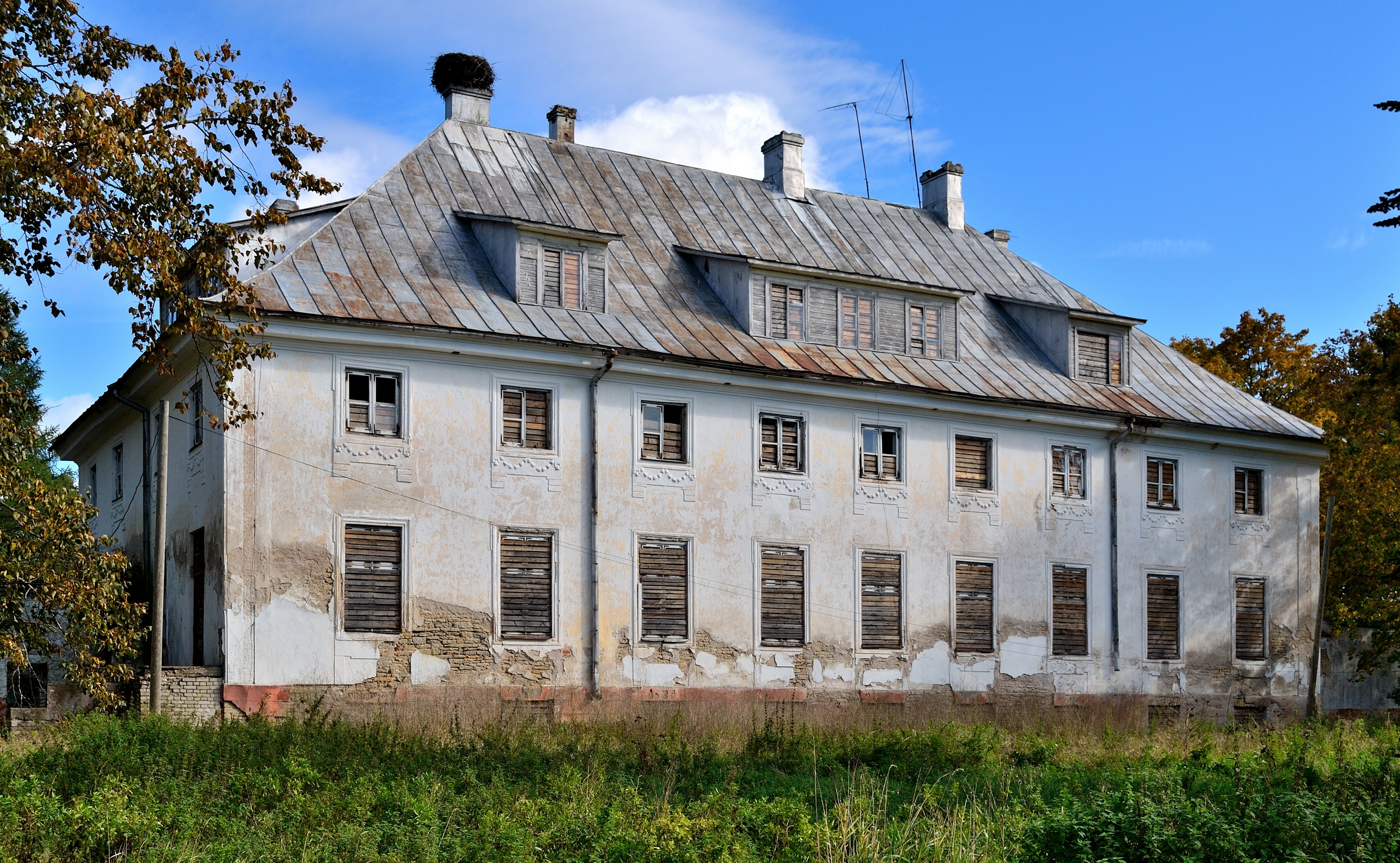
- Purila Manor main building
- Interactive map of Purila
- Country: Estonia
- County: Rapla County
- Parish: Rapla Parish
- Time zone: UTC+2 (EET)
  - Summer (DST): UTC+3 (EEST)

Purila (German: Purgel) is a village in Rapla Parish, Rapla County in northwestern Estonia.

Purila Manor is located in the village.
