= Estonian national road 15 =

Road in Estonia

- Tugimaantee 15

Route information
- Length: 97.2 km (60.4 mi)

Major junctions
- From: Tallinn ( T4)
- To: Türi ( T5)

Location
- Country: Estonia

Highway system
- Transport in Estonia
← T14	→ T17

Tugimaantee 15 (ofcl. abbr. T15), also called the Tallinn–Rapla–Türi highway (Estonian: Tallinna–Rapla–Türi maantee), is a 97.2-kilometre-long north-south national basic road in northern Estonia. The highway begins at the Tallinn district of Nõmme on national road 4 under the name of Viljandi maantei. It crosses national road 11 in Luige and passes through Kohila, Hagudi, Rapla, Kehtna, Lelle and Käru to national road 5 in Türi.

== Route ==
T15 passes through the following counties and municipalities:

Harju County

- Tallinn
- Kiili Parish
- Saku Parish

Rapla County

- Kohila Parish
- Rapla Parish
- Kehtna Parish

Järva County

- Türi Parish

== See also ==
- Transport in Estonia
