= Estonian national road 87 =

Road in Estonia

- Tugimaantee 87

Route information
- Length: 6.0 km (3.7 mi)

Major junctions
- From: Puuri
- To: Rosma

Location
- Country: Estonia

Highway system
- Transport in Estonia
← T86	→ T88

Tugimaantee 87 (ofcl. abbr. T87), also called the Põlva ring road (Estonian: Põlva ringtee), is the ring road of Põlva. It starts at the intersection of national roads 62 and 89 on the west side of town and runs north and east of Põlva through the intersections of roads 61 and 62 to the southeast side of the town to road 90. The length of the road is 6.0 kilometers.

== See also ==
- Transport in Estonia
