= Estonian national road 18 =

Road in Estonia

- Tugimaantee 18

Route information
- Length: 4.7 km (2.9 mi)

Major junctions
- From: Niitvälja ( T8)
- To: Kulna ( T17)

Location
- Country: Estonia

Highway system
- Transport in Estonia
| ← T17 | → T20 |

Tugimaantee 18 (ofcl. abbr. T18), also called the Niitvälja–Kulna highway (Estonian: Niitvälja–Kulna maantee), is a 4.7-kilometre-long national basic road in northwestern Estonia. The highway begins at Niitvälja on national road 8 and ends at Kulna on national road 17.

== Route ==
T18 passes through Lääne-Harju Parish in Harju County.

== See also ==
- Transport in Estonia
