= Cooper T87 =

The Cooper T87 is a special purpose-built open-wheel race car, originally built by British manufacturer Cooper Cars, that was designed and developed by British racing driver and engineer Martin Brain, specifically for both hillclimb racing and Formula Libre competitions, in 1967. The car itself was based around a Formula 2 chassis, and was equipped with a naturally aspirated 2.5 L (150 cu in) Daimler SP 250, usually found in a Daimler 250, which produced 142 hp (106 kW). It competed in a number of races and events, before it was sold to Clive Oakley, who continued to use it in its original guise for a while, before later fitting it with a 3.5 L (210 cu in) Rover V8. Brain had previously fitted a 440 cu in (7.2 L) Chrysler V8 engine to a Cooper T81 Formula One car chassis.
