= Estonian national road 9 =

Road in Estonia

National Road 9
- Põhimaantee 9
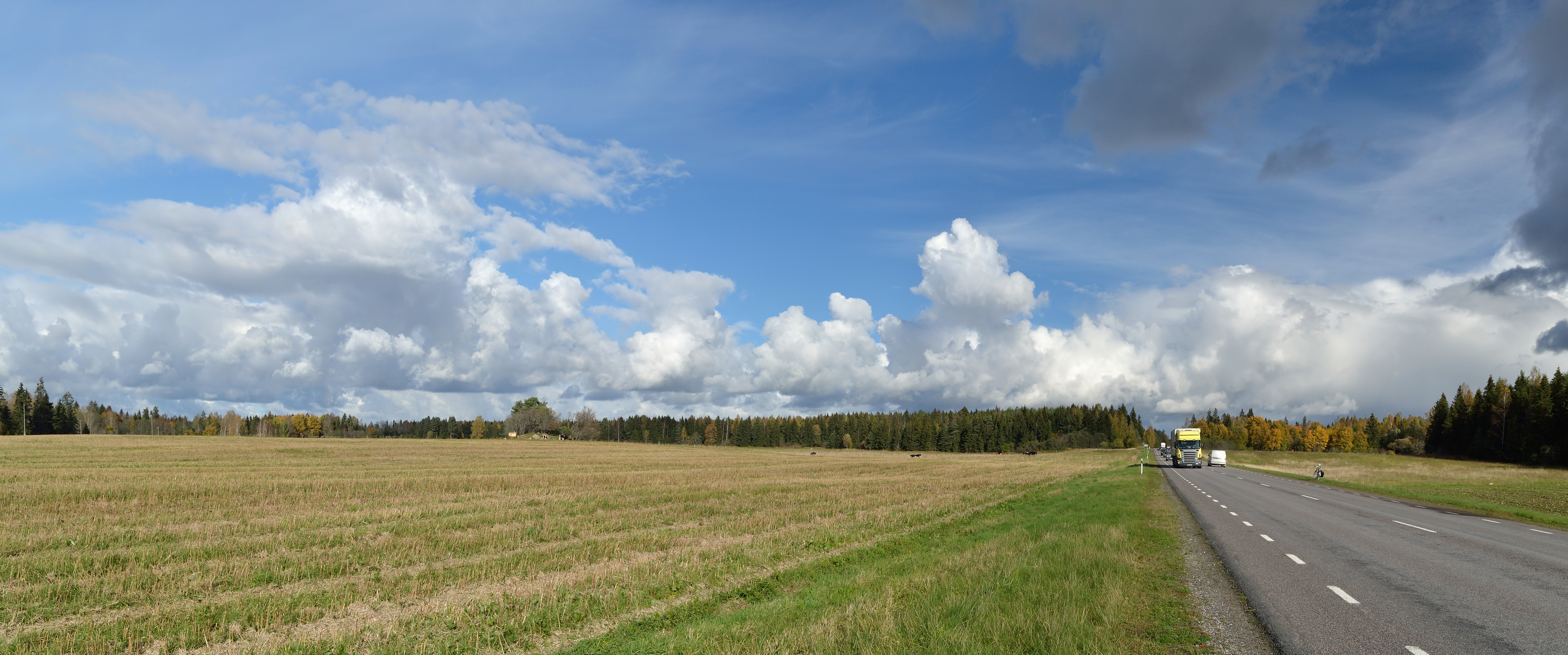

Route information
- Length: 80 km (50 mi)

Major junctions
- From: Ääsmäe
- Risti Saunja Haapsalu
- To: Rohuküla

Location
- Country: Estonia
- Counties: Harju County; Lääne County

Highway system
- Transport in Estonia
| ← T8 | → T10 |

National Road 9 (also known as Ääsmäe-Haapsalu-Rohuküla maantee; Ääsmäe-Haapsalu-Rohuküla highway) begins from Ääsmäe at the Ääsmäe interchange of the T4. The highway ends at Rohuküla port.

== Route ==
The total length of the road is 80.7 km.

== See also ==
- Transport in Estonia
