= Risti, Estonia =

Borough in Estonia

Risti
- Small borough
- Location in Estonia
- Coordinates: 58°59′48″N 24°03′15″E
- Country: Estonia
- County: Lääne County
- Parish: Lääne-Nigula Parish

Population (1 January 2019)
  - Total: 535

Risti is a small borough (Estonian: alevik) in Lääne-Nigula Parish, Lääne County, in western Estonia.

Before 20 October 2013, Risti was the administrative centre of Risti Parish.

== Gallery ==
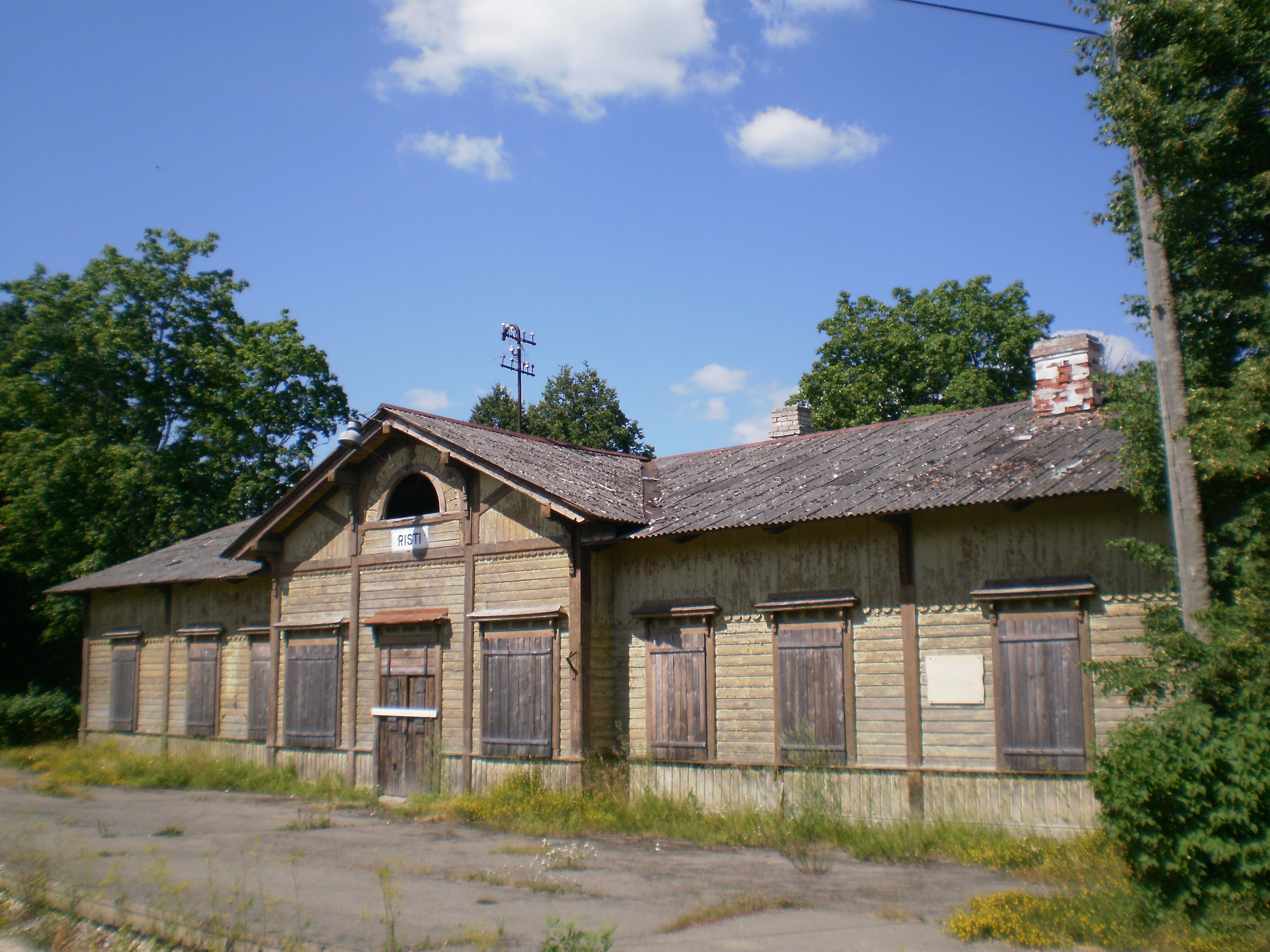
Risti railway station

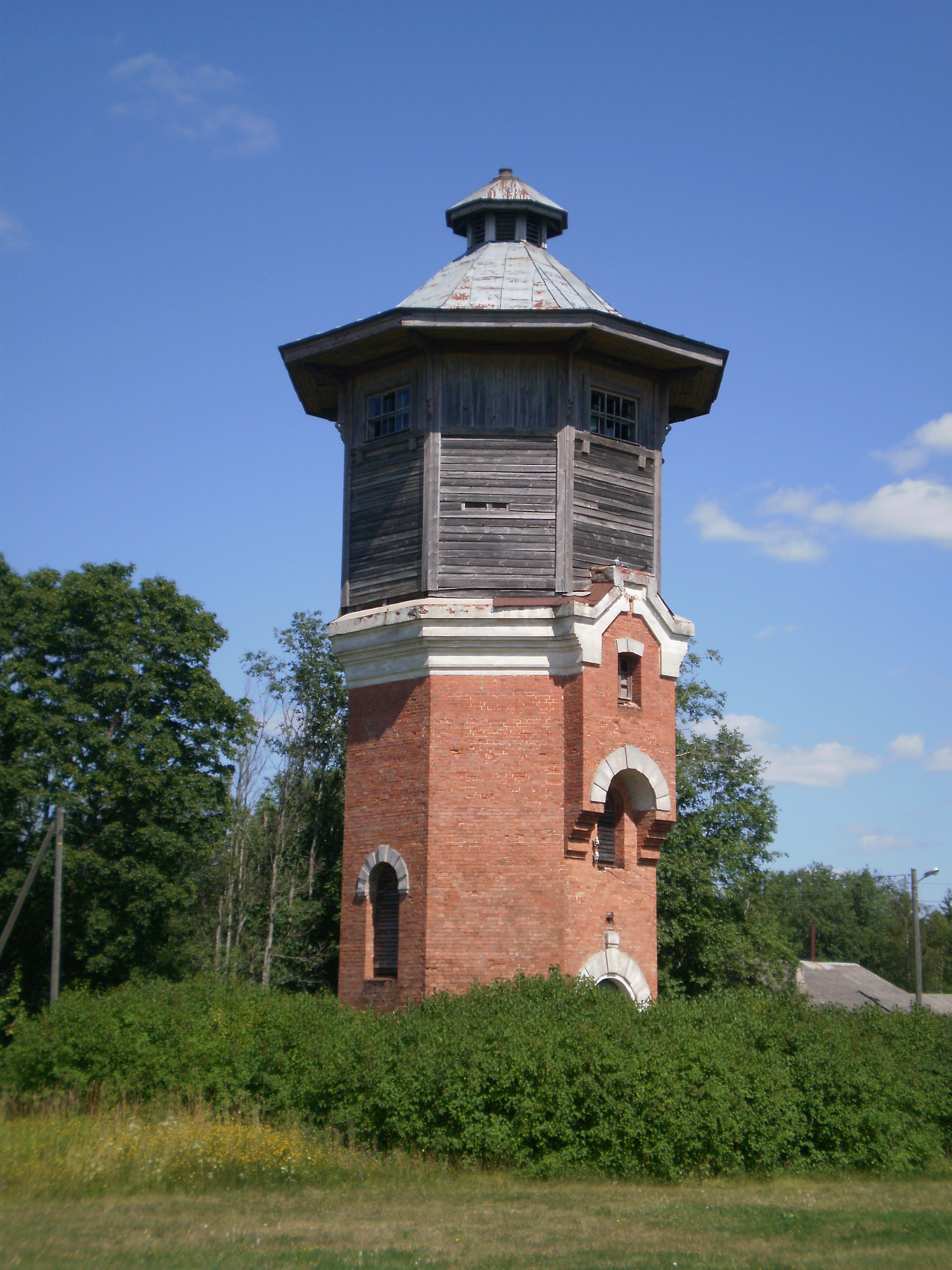
Water tower in railway station

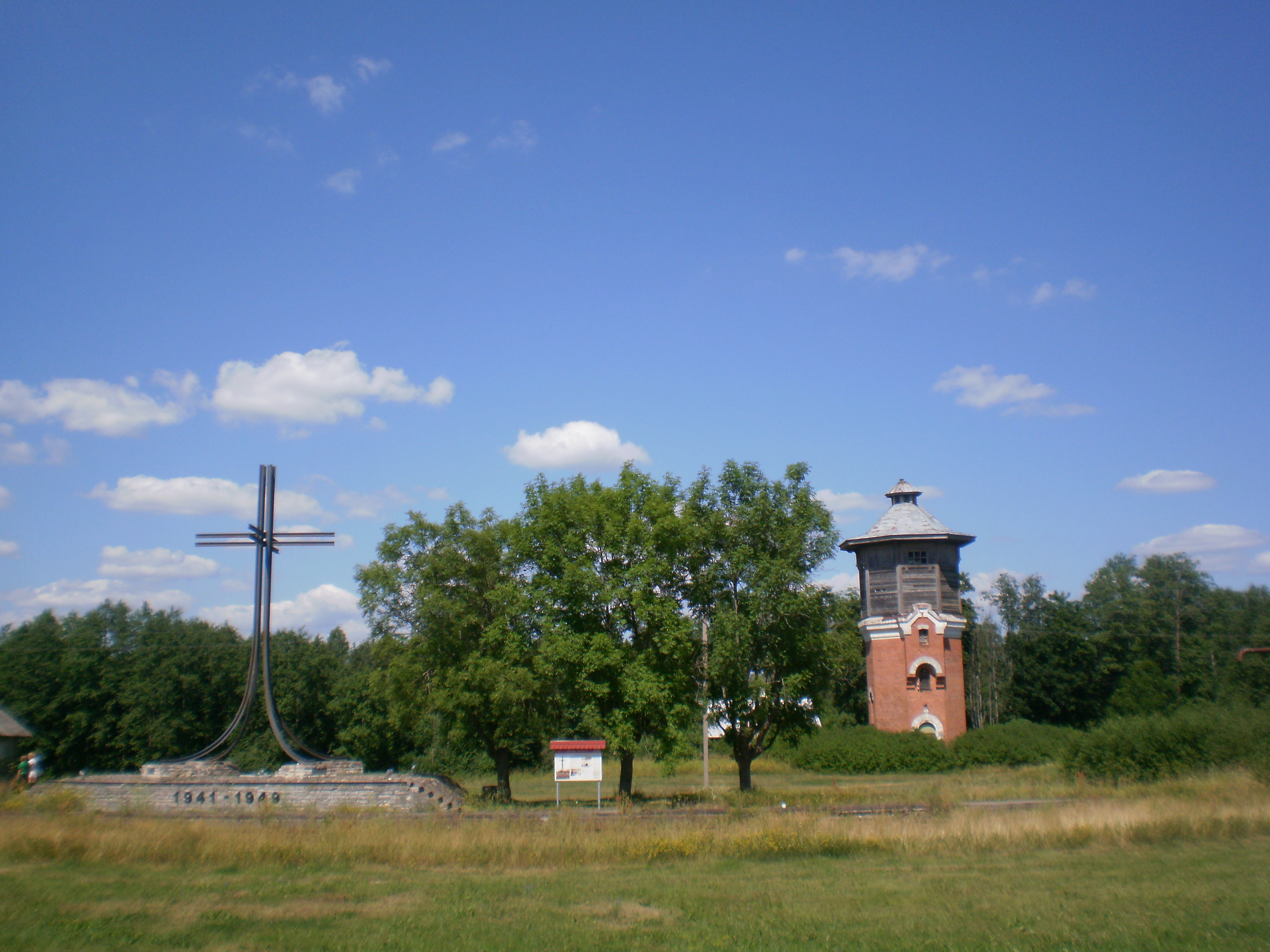
Memorial to the victims of deportations

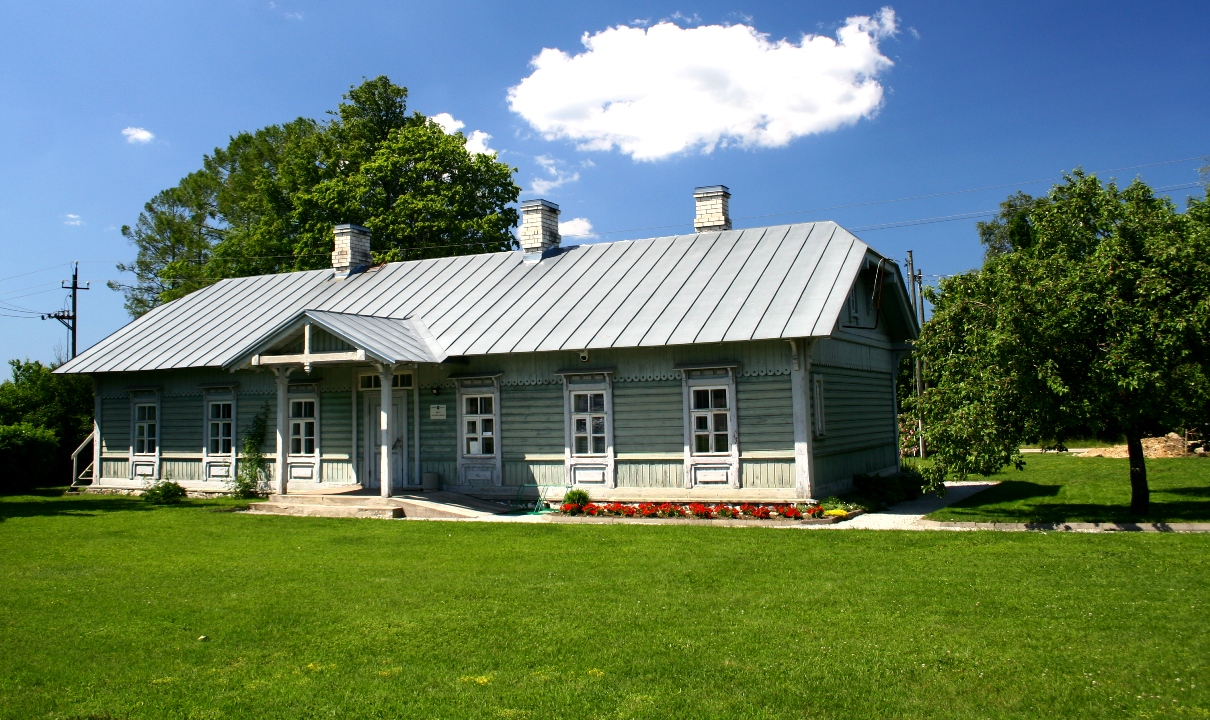
Risti library

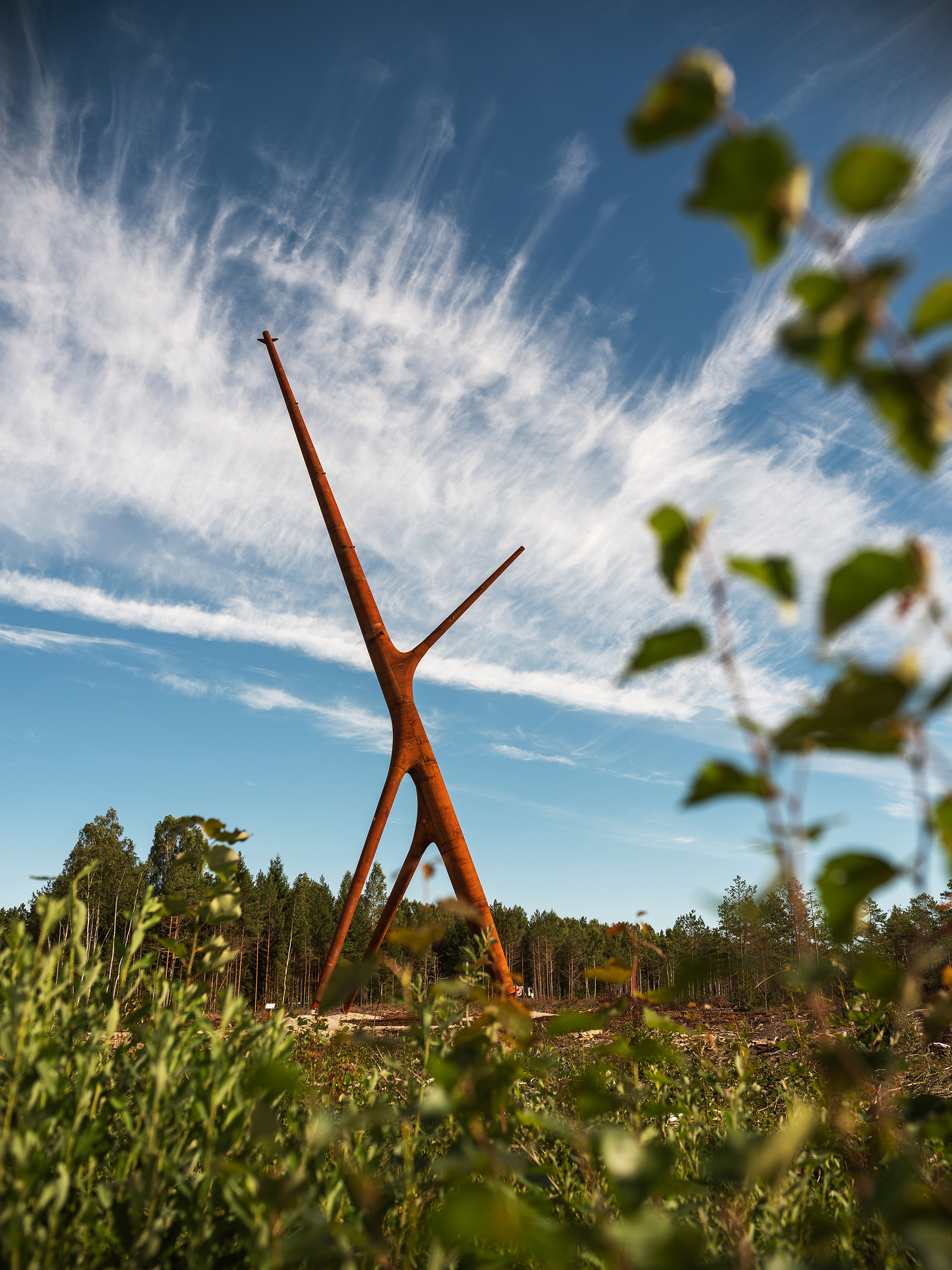
Designer high-voltage pylon Bog Fox

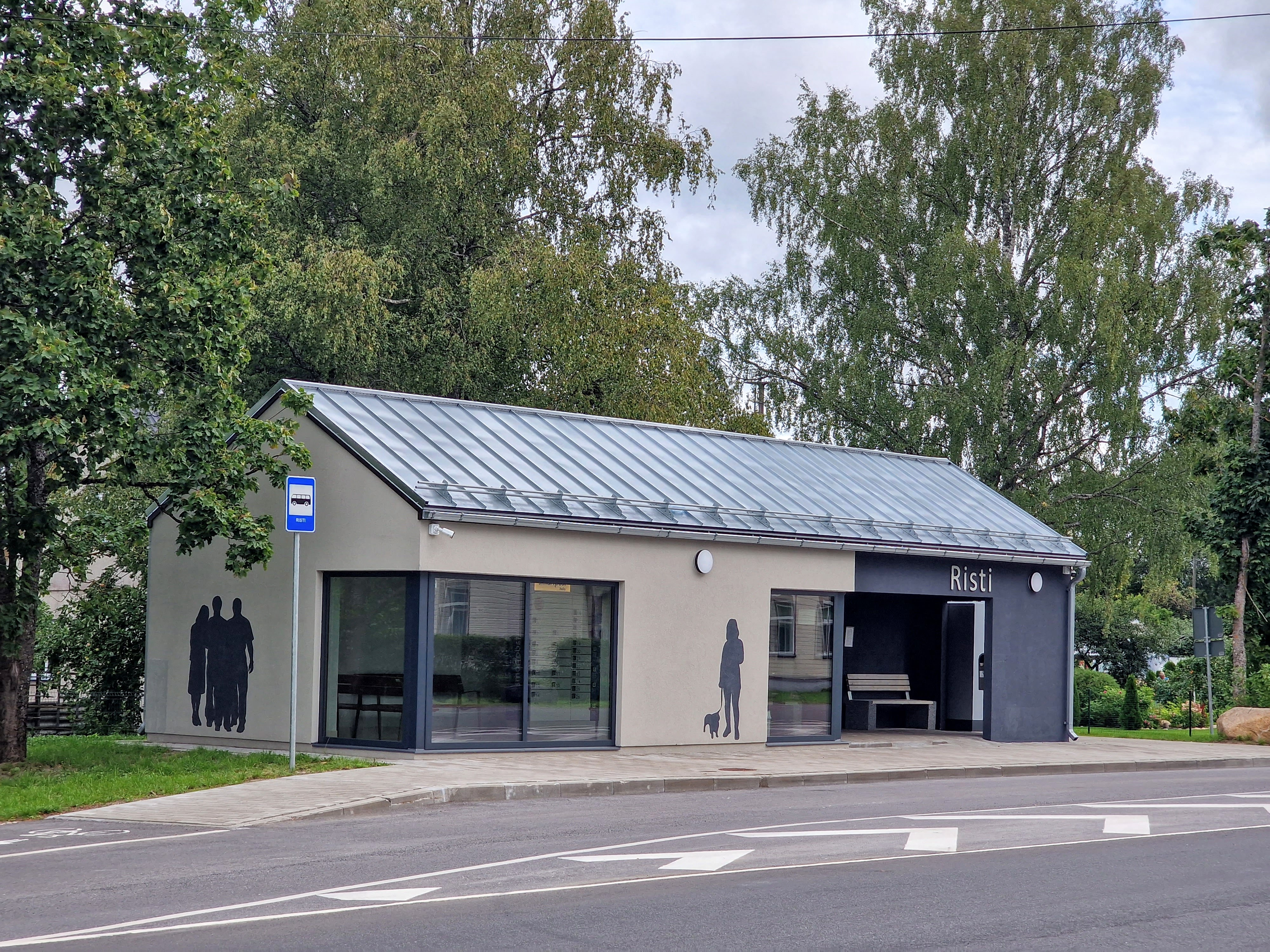
Risti bus station
