= Estonian national road 11 =

Road in Estonia

National Road 11
- Põhimaantee 11

Route information
- Length: 38 km (24 mi)

Major junctions
- From: Väo
- Jüri Luige Kanama
- To: Keila

Location
- Country: Estonia
- Counties: Harju County

Highway system
- Transport in Estonia
| ← T10 | → T92 |

Tallinna ringtee (translates from Estonian as Tallinn ring road, alternatively Põhimaantee nr 11, unofficially abbreviated T11) is a semi-orbital highway around the city of Tallinn, running from Väo to Keila. The road is part of the European route E265.

The road serves a connection between Tallinn's metropolitan area and the numerous national routes that intersect it. In 2021, the highest traffic volumes were between Jüri and Kurna, with an AADT of 23,500. The rest of the route had an AADT of at least 10,000.

The road is mainly a 2+2 dual carriageway (I class), being steadily upgraded since 2012 to meet rising traffic and safety demands. The road is yet to be widened between Valingu and Keila.

== Overview ==
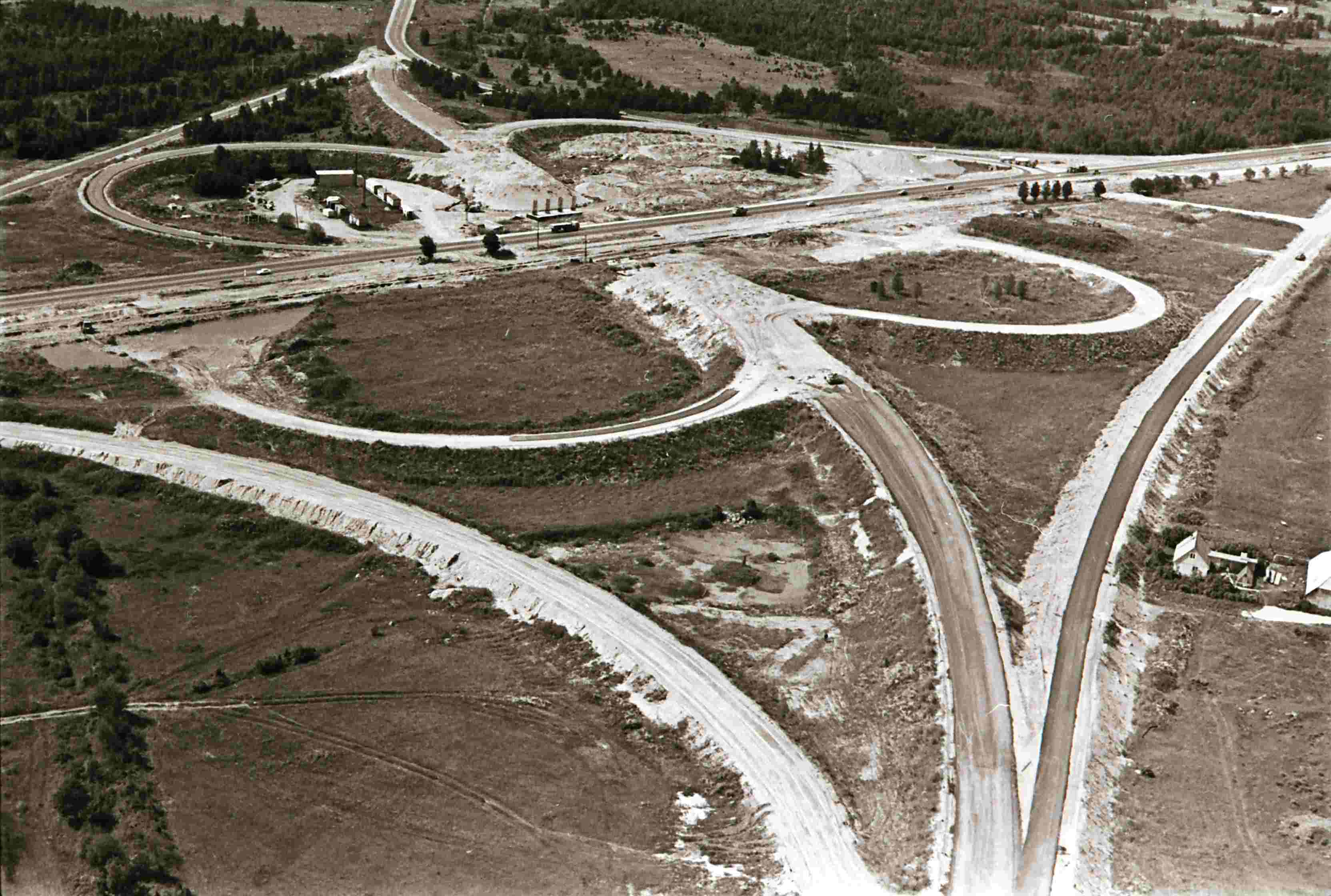
Construction of the Kanama interchange in 1975

The road was built between 1972 and 1976 by TREV-2 as the first ringway of its kind in Estonia.

The T11 starts within city boundaries on the very outskirts of Lasnamäe, with a grade-separated roundabout interchange servicing the T1/E20 (on a flyover), the start of the urban highway Laagna tee (via Rahu tee) and a small residential area. The first interchange services Väo quarry and a rest area for trucks, while following exits service regional routes. The Lagedi interchange sees the motorway cross the Tallinn-Narva railway and provides a connection to Sõjamäe via the T11290.

Turning southwest, interchanges at Rae and Põrguvälja lead to the roundabout interchange with T2/E263. The motorway now heads west, with interchanges at Kurna (servicing the country's first IKEA), Luige, Saku, Juuliku. The Via Baltica is met near Saue at the Kanama interchange. The motorway (and the newest stretch of it) ends after crossing the Tallinn-Paldiski railway at Vanamõisa, with the road continuing on the old 1+1 configuration.

The highway ends in Keila, meeting with the T8 at a roundabout. Plans to extend the motorway here are in preparation, but behind financial barriers. The E265 continues westbound to Paldiski and eventually, Kapellskär.

=== Road lane count ===
| 34 km | 4 km |
| 2+2 road | 1+1 road |

=== Traffic regulations ===
The dual carriageway section of the highway has a summer-time elevated speed limit of 110 km/h, these are adjusted on all Estonian motorways according to weather conditions. Electronic signage allows for dynamic speed limits and conveying of road conditions or traffic information.

The lowest bridge on the T11 is the northern roundabout loop of the Jüri interchange at 4,8m tall. The remaining few height restrictions come in at >5m.

== Route table ==
The entire route is in Harju County.

| Municipality | Location | km | mi | Destinations | Notes |
|---|---|---|---|---|---|
| Tallinn | Väo | 0.0 | 0.0 | – Tallinn, Narva, Muuga; Laagna tee | |
| Tallinn | Veneküla | | | Veneküla, Veneküla tee, Väo | |
| Rae | Lepiku | | | – Keila, Jüri | North-to-south U-turn |
| Rae | Posti | | | | Westbound exit and entrance only |
| Rae | Soodevahe | | | Varivere tee; – Aruküla, Lagedi | No connection between westbound and eastbound exits/entrances |
| Rae | Lagedi | | | – Tallinn, Lagedi | |
| Rae | Rae | | | – Jüri, Rae | |
| Rae | Põrguvälja | | | – Jüri; – Lehmja centre, Pildiküla | |
| Rae | Jüri | | | – Tallinn, Assaku, Tartu, Kose | Grade-separated roundabout interchange |
| Rae | Õlleköögi | | | – Õlleköögi road | Southbound exit and eastbound entrance only |
| Rae | Kurna | | | – Kiili, Kangru | |
| Kiili | Luige | | | – Tallinn, Rapla, Luige centre | |
| Saku | Saku | | | – Tallinn, Männiku, Saku | |
| Saku | Juuliku | | | – Tallinn, Laagri, Saku | |
| Saku | Jälgimäe | | | – Laagri, Jälgimäe centre; – Saku | No connection between northbound and southbound exits/entrances |
| Saue | Kanama | | | – Tallinn, Laagri, Pärnu, Haapsalu | |
| Saue | Saue | | | – Jõgisoo; Saue | |
| Saue | Aila | | | Aila, Saue | |
| Saue | Vanamõisa | | | Vanamõisa | |
End of dual carriageway
| Harku | Valingu | | | Estonian national road 11117 | Envisaged to replace current intersections. Connections to T11117 and current highway. |
| Harku | Valingu | | | – Jõgisoo, Valingu | T-intersection with traffic light. |
| Harku | Ülejõe | | | – Tallinn, Tutermaa, Paldiski | Multi-lane roundabout; E265 continues towards Paldiski. |
| Harku | – | | | | Westbound exit and eastbound entrance to access current terminus roundabout and proposed southern bypass of Keila |
| Harku | – | | | Estonian national road 8 European route E265 | Partial cloverleaf leading to proposed northern bypass of Keila |
1.000 mi = 1.609 km; 1.000 km = 0.621 mi: Incomplete access; Proposed
