= Estonian national road 2 =

Road in Estonia

National Road 2
- Põhimaantee 2
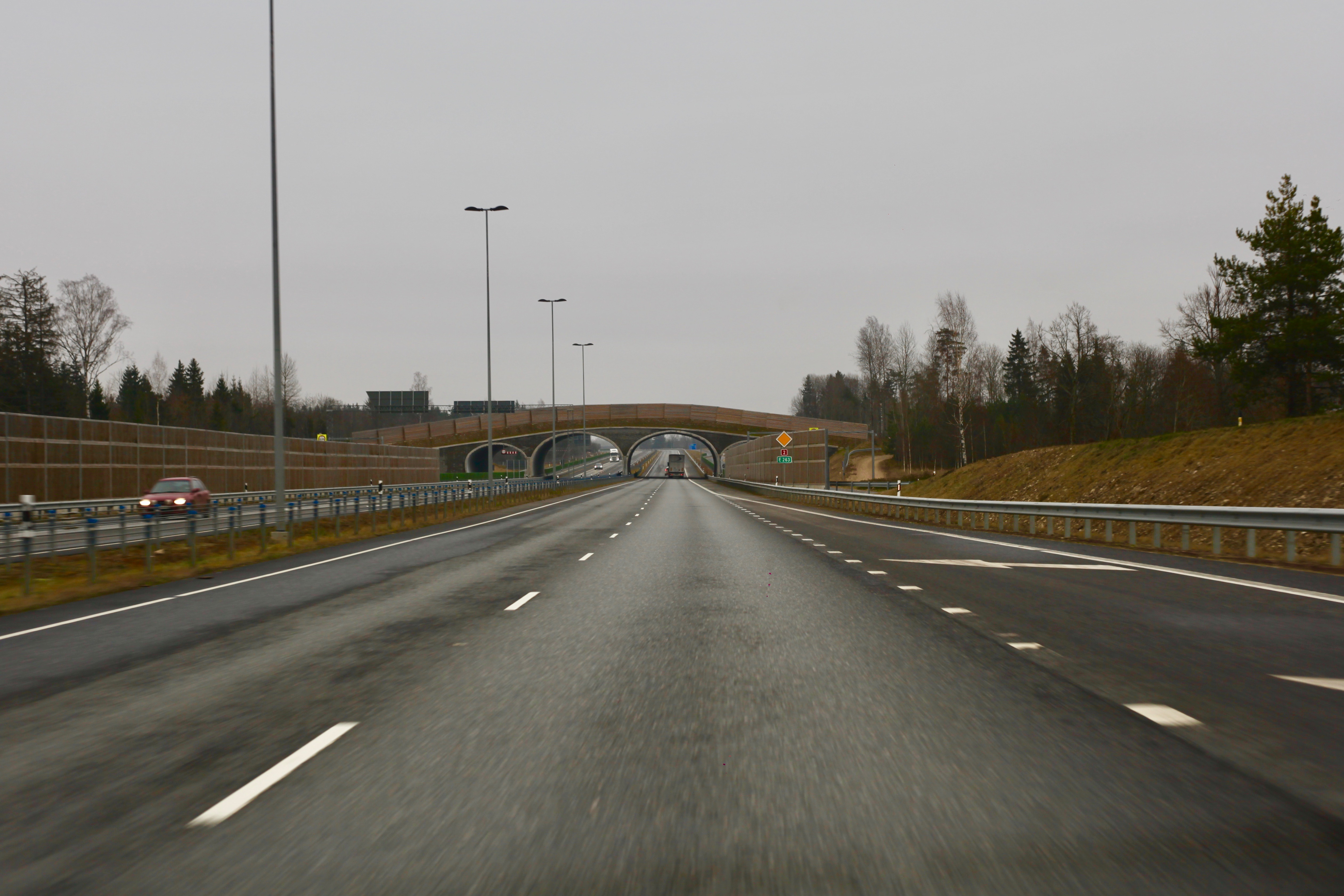

Route information
- Maintained by Estonian Transport Administration
- Length: 282 km (175 mi)

Major junctions
- From: Tallinn
- Ülemiste Jüri; Kose; Kose-Risti; Mäo; Mäeküla; Imavere; Mõhküla; Puhu; Kärevere; Tiksoja; Tartu; Tartu; Reola; Tatra; Saverna; Kanepi; Kanepi; Võru; Võru Verijärve
- To: Luhamaa

Location
- Country: Estonia
- Counties: Harju County Järva County; Jõgeva County; Tartu County; Põlva County Võru County

Highway system
- Transport in Estonia
← T1	→ T3

Tallinn-Tartu-Võru-Luhamaa maantee (Tallinn-Tartu-Võru-Luhamaa highway, alternatively Põhimaantee nr 2, unofficially abbreviated T2) is a 282-kilometre long (175 mi) north-southeast national main road in Estonia. The route follows the same path as European route E263. The road forms a major north–south corridor within Estonia, connecting the two largest cities. The highway starts in Tallinn and passes a number of notable towns, namely Kose, Põltsamaa, Tartu and Võru, with arterials branching off towards Paide, Valga, Põlva. The highway ends in Luhamaa intersecting with the T7, heading to either Latvia or Russia.

In 2023, the highest traffic volumes were around Tallinn and Tartu, with highest recorded AADT figures being 29,000 and 19,000 respectively. Heavy traffic figures are second only to the T4, with around 1,000 trucks recorded daily between Tallinn and Tartu. The road forms a major transport north–south transport route within Estonia, as it connects the two largest cities in Estonia.

The road is a dual carriageway for 86 kilometres (53 mi). The main part is between Tallinn and Mäo, forming the longest continuous stretch of dual carriageway in Estonia. Remaining stretches are short stubs just before and exiting Tartu. Several 2+1 stretches have been constructed between Mäo and Tartu to alleviate overtaking dangers. Future plans only envisage the construction of dual carriageways, albeit these have been largely put on hold due to austerity measures.

== History ==
=== Early history ===
Connections between northern and southern Estonia long predate the modern highway. Since the Viking Age, multiple permanent routes linked the regions, with summer roads following dry ground and winter roads traversing frozen rivers or early bog causeways. One such ancient bog crossing is still used by the modern road near Võõbu.

Until the early 20th century, the principal Tartu–Tallinn route was the historic Piibe highway. However, research shows an overland trail along much of the present-day road already present in the early 14th century, with negotiations during the St. George's Night uprising requiring travel between Tallinn, Tartu and Paide. The modern alignment of the road began gaining prominence in the 13th–14th centuries, when the Teutonic Order established fortified strongholds in Paide, Põltsamaa, and Puurmani, complemented by the important Kärkna Abbey of the Cistercians, all along the route. The monks constructed a new route connecting their monastery to the city of Tartu.

=== Modern era ===
Under Swedish rule, Estonia developed a network of postal routes and stations. By the 17th century, several routes between Tallinn and Tartu via Rakvere, the Piibe highway and Põltsamaa were present, with these routes being largely unchanged later. Historically, administrative divisions played a role in slowing development: Tallinn lay in Estonia, Tartu in Livonia, and interprovincial travel demand was limited until the 20th century. Consequently, the modern Tallinn–Tartu route became nationally important only in the interwar period.

The section between Tartu and Puurmani began to assume its present form in the 19th century. Straight forest cutlines replaced earlier winding tracks, though major rivers were still crossed by barges until infrastructure improved. Thus, for larger vehicles, the road from Tallinn terminated at Põltsamaa, connecting via Aidu to Piibe highway; the onward section to Kärevere had only local relevance. A significant milestone came in 1928, when the first concrete bridge over the Emajõgi at Kärevere was opened, though it famously collapsed two days later and had to be rebuilt. Hence the Tallinn-Mäo-Põltsamaa highway was rather used for traffic between Tallinn and Riga, with the route continuing towards Viljandi, Karksi-Nuia and the border at Polli.

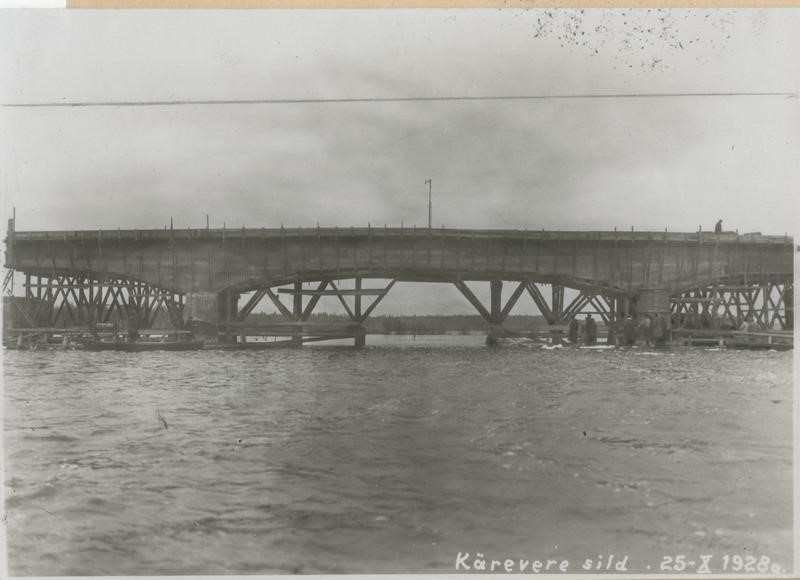
Kärevere bridge, 1928, collapsing in just two days

=== Grand highway plans of the 1930s ===
The 1930s saw ambitious highway construction initiatives, inspired by Western European motor roads and accelerated by preparations for the planned 1940 Helsinki Olympics. A new Tallinn–Riga highway was designed to pass via Paide and Põltsamaa, running arrow-straight from Tallinn to Põltsamaa. The designed road had a width of 8 metres (26 ft), with a granite foundation and topped with gravel, and a speed limit of 150 km/h (95 mph). In Viljandimaa the road would have passed straight across the Parika bog and over large valleys. The route between Tallinn and Paide would have shortened by 21 kilometres (13 mi), 24 kilometres (15 mi) total between Tallinn and Tartu.

Construction began from Tallinn in December 1934, employing up to 450 people. With the highway costing 2.4 million kroons but very little money allocated by the state, construction was slow and only 8 kilometres (5 mi) of road (up to Assaku) were constructed by 1940.

=== World War II and Soviet occupation ===
Bridges along the route were of critical military value and were destroyed by both retreating and advancing forces. Post-war Estonia faced severe infrastructure loss. Ferries and temporary wooden bridges were used initially. Permanent concrete bridges were opened at Kärevere only in 1954 and Puurmani in 1957.

By the late 1940s, the Soviet authorities prioritised the Tallinn–Mäo–Põltsamaa–Tartu route over Piibe. The highway attained all-Union importance, one of three such highways in Estonia (alongside Tallinn-Pärnu, Tallinn-Narva). It was, however, was nothing more than a twisty and tight gravel road, prone to disappearing in blizzards. In 1947, only 4.4 kilometres (2.7 mi) of highway was dust-free, and this too near urban areas.

The highway was covered in blacktop fully only by 1960, but with no foundation works undertaken, it was prone to falling apart. Works were undertaken in the following years to construct a proper bed, covered with asphalt concrete. Major Soviet-era projects included Põltsamaa bypass (1960) and Laeva bypass (1978).

=== Renewed ambitions ===
The late 1980s reawakened Estonia's highway-building ambitions. Between 1986 and 1990, the first dual carriageway section was constructed from Tallinn to Jüri. Works continued towards Vaida but halted in 1993 due to economic downturn resulting from the collapse of the USSR, restarted and finished in 1997–1998.

Widening of the highway continued slowly in the 2000s. By 2003, a section of dual carriageway was completed from Vaida to Aruvalla, but without grade-separated junctions or collectors. Joining the EU provided the state access to development funding and large scale works on the aforementioned section began in 2007, which also saw an interchange constructed in Puurmani. 2010 saw the opening of Mäo interchange, a key junction for central Estonia, with the road rerouted and built from scratch as dual carriageway.

Further works began in 2011 with dual carriageway extended from Aruvalla to Kose, finished in 2013, during which Estonia's first ecoduct was constructed. In the same year, a 2-kilometre (1 1/4 mi) stretch of dual carriageway and the Postimaja interchange were constructed on Tartu's western bypass, with a further three kilometres (1 3/4 mi) of 2+2 opened the next year.

The first 2+1 sections of the highway (and indeed in all of Estonia) were opened in 2017 between Annikvere and Neanurme, with further sections opened in 2018, 2019, and 2023.

The largest road construction project in Estonian history began in 2017, extending the dual carriageway from Kose to Võõbu. The highway was completely built from scratch on a new route, with interchanges, ecoducts, and electronic signage. The latter is used for a new at-grade animal crossing solution, with sensors detecting animals near the highway and lowering the speed limit accordingly. This was the first section of highway in the country with a speed limit of 120 km/h (75 mph).

A further extension, similarly on an all-new route, was opened between Võõbu and Mäo in 2022, hence roughly half of the route between Tallinn and Tartu is now dual carriageway. A further few kilometres were widened between Kärevere and Kardla in the same year.

== Route description ==
The T2 (Estonian: põhimaantee 2) is a major north–southeast highway connecting the capital of the country, Tallinn, to the second largest city, Tartu and beyond into Põlva- and Võrumaa. It follows the same route as European route E263.

The route begins in Tallinn from Viru Square and runs through the city for 6 kilometres (3 3/4 mi), following the city streets of Narva maantee, Pronksi and Tartu maantee. It services Tallinn Airport, with planes taking off and landing just above the highway. At Assaku, the road crosses the yet-unbuilt Rail Baltica, with a viaduct already in place. In Jüri, the carriageway is taken over a roundabout junction with the T11. Until Vaida, the road is nearly arrow-straight, as per pre-war plans. The road continually modernises towards Mäo as newer dual carriageway sections are encountered. From Kose, the road is controlled-access. Bypassing Mäo, the T5 is met at an interchange, with the road transforming to single carriageway a few kilometres after.

From here, the road will pass through settlements owing to the age of its route, with lower speed limits and speed cameras in place. Shortly after Põltsamaa the road widens to 2+1, with a speed limit of 100 km/h (60 mph) on bypassing sections. Road width alternates several times until Tartu, with another 2+1 section, dual carriageway and single carriageway.

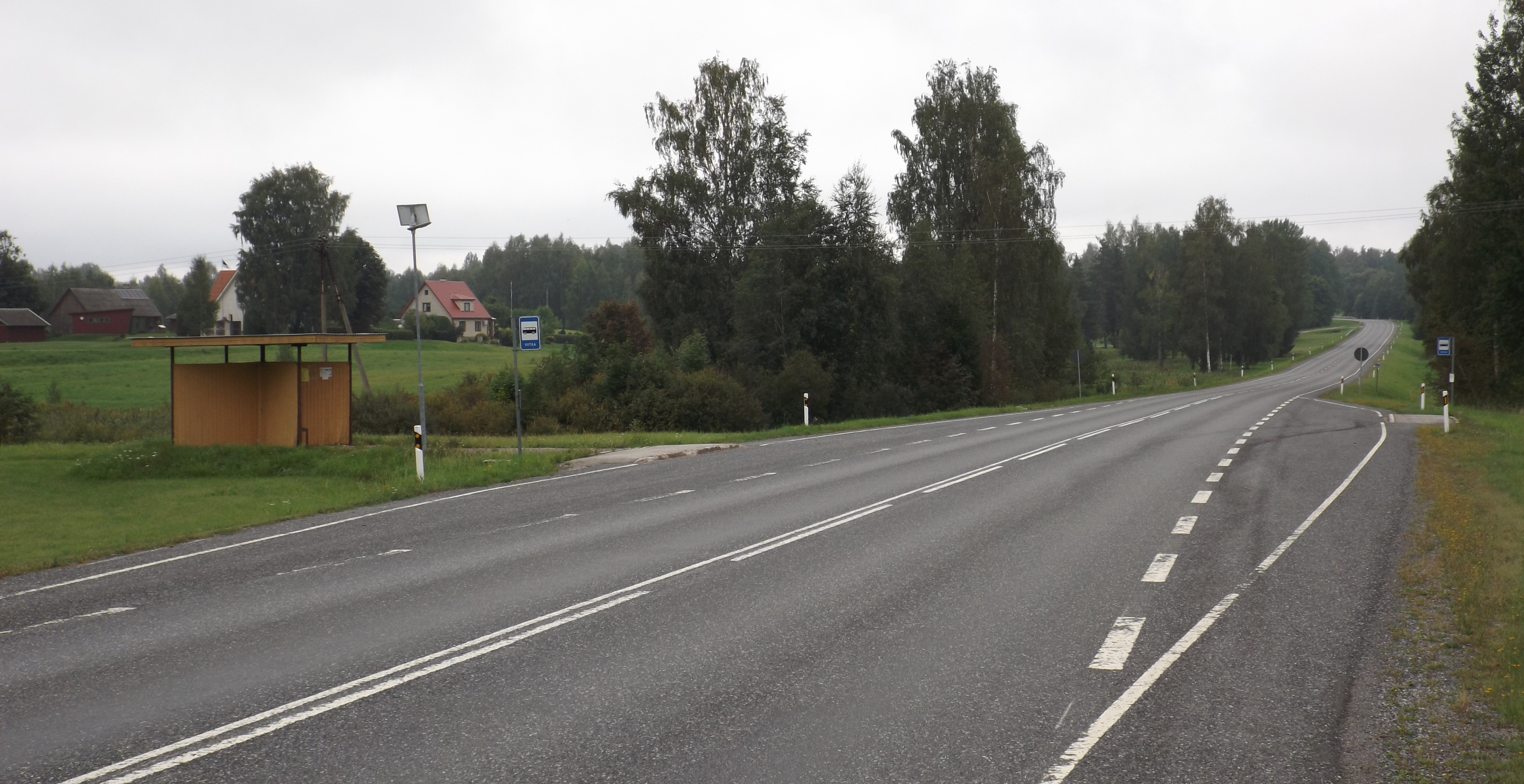
T2 in Võrumaa

Approaching Tartu the road splits in two, with the T40 heading straight into Tartu and the T2 bypassing it from the west. The opposite direction forces traffic into a full stop, giving way to northbound T40 traffic. Several roundabouts and roundabout interchanges are met with the T22103, T92 and T3 respectively. The bypass continues with grade-separated interchanges, the largest being a trumpet interchange with the city's southern/eastern bypass. Widening to dual carriageway, the highway services Tartu Airport, after which it continues southbound as single carriageway. The road will again head through or close past settlements with lowered speed limits.

Before Võru, the road heads left on a T-junction. Roundabouts are met bypassing Võru and another T-junction after Võru, the road once again heading left. The highway terminates in almost the very southern tip of Estonia, with border crossings to Latvia and Russia via the T7 only 18 and 2 1/2 km (11 1/4 and 1 1/2 mi) away, respectively.

=== Road length of lane ===
6 km	36 km	39 km	4 km	15 km	8 km	17 km	16 km	14 km	7 km	2 km	3 km	9 km	2 km	3 km	3 km	97 km
Urban	2+2 road	2+2 road	2+2 road	1+1 road	2+2 construction	1+1 road	2+1 road	1+1 road	2+1 road	1+1 road	2+2 road	1+1 road	Urban	1+1 road	2+2 road	1+1 road

== Route table ==
The route passes through Harju County (Tallinn, Rae, Kose), Järva County (Paide, Järva), Jõgeva County (Põltsamaa), Tartu County (Tartu, Tartu, Kambja), Põlva County (Kanepi), Võru County (Võru, Setomaa).

Municipality	Location	km	mi	Destinations	Notes
Tallinn	Viru väljak	0.0	0.0		Viru Square is the starting point for four highways - Tallinn-Narva, Tallinn-Tartu, Tallinn-Pärnu and Tallinn-Paldiski. Concurrency with T1.
Tallinn	Pronksi			Estonian national road 11608	Urban intersection
Tallinn	Ülemiste			– Narva	Peterburi tee crosses on flyover; end of T1 concurrency.
Tallinn	Ülemiste			Estonian national road 11290	Urban intersection
Tallinn	Mõigu			Estonian national road 11330	Urban intersection
Exiting Tallinn, start of dual carriageway
Rae	–				Proposed interchange with proposed Tallinn inner ring road (T96).
Rae	Assaku			– Järveküla, Assaku	Furthermost ramps separated by 1.4 km (0.9 mi)
Rae	Pildiküla			– Lehmja, Pildiküla	
Rae	Jüri			– Keila, Pärnu highway, Narva highway, Jüri	
Rae	Patika			– Nabala, Kautjala, Patika centre	
Rae	Vaida			– Vaidasoo – Vaida	
Rae	Aruvalla			– Urge, Tuhala, Jägala	
Rae	Piuga			Tuhala, Saula	Southbound exit ramp only
Kose	Saula			Estonian national road 11704 Estonian national road 11703	North- and southbound entrance only
Kose	Siniallika			– Saula centre	Northbound exit only
Kose	Kolu			– Tammiku, Oru, Kolu	
Kose	Kurena			Estonian national road 11706	Southbound exit only
Kose	Kuivajõe			– Kose; – Kose-Uuemõisa, Karla;	
Kose	Kose-Risti			– Purila, Kose;	Pre-motorway T2 forms northbound exit from T11708
Kose	Ardu			– Ardu, Ojasoo, Triigi	
Paide	Mustla			– Ardu, Mustla	
Paide	Otiku			– Eivere – Anna – Otiku centre	
Paide	Korba			Estonian national road 15220	Southbound entrance only; pre-motorway T2 rejoins
Paide	Kükita			– Mäo, Tarbja centre	Southbound exit only; pre-motorway T2
Paide	Mäo			– Pärnu, Türi, Paide, Rakvere, Aravete	
Paide	Valgma			– Mäo centre; Vodja	
End of dual carriageway
Paide	Mäeküla			– Piibe maantee, Koeru	
Paide	Mäeküla			– Mündi	
Järva	Prandi			– Prandi	
Järva	Koigi			– Päinurme, Koigi centre	
Järva	Koigi			– Prandi	
Järva	Koigi			– Laimetsa	
Järva	Käsukonna			– Laimetsa	
Järva	Imavere			– Viljandi, Imavere centre	
Järva	Kiigevere			– Imavere	
Põltsamaa	Adavere			– Rutikvere	
Põltsamaa	Adavere			– Puiatu	
Põltsamaa	Mõhküla			– Eistvere	
Põltsamaa	Põltsamaa			– Võhma, Põltsamaa	
Põltsamaa	Põltsamaa			– Põltsamaa, Pajusi	
Põltsamaa	Põltsamaa			– Põltsamaa, Jõgeva	
Põltsamaa	Põltsamaa			– Lustivere	
Põltsamaa	Annikvere			– Annikvere centre	
Start of 2+1
Põltsamaa	Kaliküla			– Lustivere	
Põltsamaa	Neanurme			– Umbusi	
Põltsamaa	Neanurme			– Tõrenurme	Northbound exit and entrance only
Põltsamaa	Pikknurme			– Umbusi; – Saduküla	
End of 2+1
Põltsamaa	Puurmani			– Puurmani; – Tabivere;	Single carriageway interchange
Tartu	Siniküla			– Laeva, Siniküla centre	
Tartu	Rootsi			– Siniküla, Laeva	
Start of 2+1
End of 2+1
Tartu	Kärevere			– Kärkna, Jõgeva highway	
Start of dual carriageway
End of dual carriageway
Tartu	Kardla			– Kardla	
Tartu	Kardla			– Ilmatsalu	
Tartu	Rähni			– Rahinge	
Tartu	Tiksoja			– Vorbuse	
Tartu	Tiksoja			– Tartu city centre	
Tartu	Ilmatsalu			– Ilmatsalu, Rahinge; Tartu, Ilmatsalu street	
Tartu	Viljandi			– Viljandi, Puhja; Tartu, Viljandi maantee	
Tartu	Riia			– Valga, Elva; City centre	Grade-separated roundabout junction with T2 on flyover
Kambja	Variku			Tõrvandi, Roopa street	Single carriageway interchange
Kambja	Postimaja			Narva, Räpina, Jõgeva, Tartu	
Start of dual carriageway
Kambja	Tõrvandi			– Lemmatsi	Westbound exit and southbound entrance only
Kambja	Lennu			– Külitse, Tartu Airport, Tõrvandi	
End of dual carriageway
Kambja	Reola			– Unipiha – Põlva	
Kambja	Tatra			– Virulase	
Kambja	Tatra			– Otepää	
Kambja	Kambja			– Nõo	
Kambja	Kambja			– Rebase	
Kambja	Kambja			– Kavandu	
Kambja	Kambja			– Sirvaku	
Kambja	Kambja			– Sirvaku	
Kanepi	Vissi			– Pangodi, Kammeri	
Kanepi	Vissi			– Vooreküla	
Kanepi	Maaritsa			– Prangli	
Kanepi	Maaritsa			– Otepää	
Kanepi	Sulaoja			– Krüüdneri	
Kanepi	Sulaoja			– Piigaste	
Kanepi	Abissaare			– Pikareinu	
Kanepi	Saverna			– Põlva	
Kanepi	Saverna			– Krootuse	
Kanepi	Saverna			– Tiido	
Kanepi	Saverna			– Otepää, Valgjärve	
Kanepi	Silgu			– Jõksi	
Kanepi	Kanepi			– Ihamaru	
Kanepi	Kanepi			– Otepää, Kanepi	
Kanepi	Kanepi			– Varbuse	
Kanepi	Kanepi			– Otepää, Kanepi	
Kanepi	Kanepi			– Põlva	
Kanepi	Erastvere			– Sillaotsa	
Kanepi	Peetrimõisa			– Magari, Sulbi	
Võru	Peetrimõisa			– Heimtali church	
Võru	Mäekülä			– Antsla, Osula, Raiste	
Võru	Navi			– Pärnu	
Võru	Navi			– Väimela, Navi	
Võru	Võru			– Võru, Põlva	
Võru	Võru			– Võru, Koidula, Räpina	
Võru	Verijärve			– Umbsaare	
Võru	Verijärve			– Valga, Võru	
Võru	Verijärve			– Rõuge	
Võru	Verijärve			– Lasva	
Võru	Räpo			– Uue-Saaluse	
Võru	Tootsi			– Kasaritsa	
Võru	Holsta			– Uue-Saaluse	
Võru	Holsta			– Vana-Saaluse	
Võru	Hinsa			– Loosi	
Võru	Hinsa			– Vana-Saaluse	
Võru	Vastseliina			– Loosi, Kapera	
Võru	Vastseliina			–	
Võru	Vastseliina			– Obinitsa, Meremäe	
Võru	Vastseliina			– Vastseliina	
Võru	Illi			– Meremäe, Vana-Vastseliina, Tsiistre, Kirikumäe	
Võru	Vatsa			– Miikse	
Võru	Viitka			– Pältre	
Setomaa	Luhamaa			– Riga, Pskov	
1.000 mi = 1.609 km; 1.000 km = 0.621 mi: Concurrency terminus; Incomplete access

== See also ==
- European route E263
