= Ülejõe =

Ülejõe (Estonian for "Across the River") refers to several places in Estonia:

- Ülejõe, Pärnu, neighborhood of Pärnu
- Ülejõe, Tartu, neighborhood of Tartu
- Ülejõe, Harju County
  - Ülejõe, Anija Parish, village in Anija Parish
  - Ülejõe, Rae Parish, village in Rae Parish
- Ülejõe, Järva County
  - Ülejõe, Järva Parish, village in Järva Parish
  - Ülejõe, Türi Parish, village in Türi Parish
- Ülejõe, Rapla County
  - Ülejõe, Märjamaa Parish, village in Märjamaa Parish
  - Ülejõe, Rapla Parish, village in Rapla Parish
