= Aaviku =

Aaviku may refer to several places in Estonia:

- Aaviku, Harju County, village in Rae Parish, Harju County
- Aaviku, Lääne-Viru County, village in Haljala Parish, Lääne-Viru County
- Aaviku, Saare County, village in Saaremaa Parish, Saare County
