= Paraspõllu Nature Reserve =

Protected area in Estonia

- Location within Estonia
- Location: Estonia
- Nearest city: Perila
- Coordinates: 59°18′N 25°06′E
- Area: 479 ha (1,180 acres)
- Established: 1999

Paraspõllu Nature Reserve is a nature reserve which is located in Harju County, Estonia.

The area of the nature reserve is 479 ha.

The protected area was founded in 1999 to protect valuable habitat types and threatened species in Suursoo village (Rae Parish) and in Igavere and Pikavere village (both in former Raasiku Parish).
