= Ossu =

Ossu may refer to:

- Ossu, Timor-Leste, a village and subdistrict in Timor-Leste.
- Õssu, a village in Estonia.
