= Anton thor Helle =

Estonian Bible translator

Anton thor Helle (7 November [O.S. 28 October] 1683 in Tallinn – 24 April [O.S. 13 April] 1748 in Jüri; also Anton Thorhelle, Anton torHelle, Anton thorHelle or Anthonij Torhelle) was the translator of the first Bible in Estonian in 1739, and the first Estonian grammar. The New Testament was a North Estonian revision of the 1648 version by Johannes Gutslaff (died 1657), the author of Observationes Grammaticae circa linguam Esthonicam, and Helle's version was revised many times, including by C. Malm in 1896.
