= Seli (disambiguation) =

Seli or Kato Vermio is a village and winter sports resort in Greece.

Seli may also refer to:

Places in Estonia

- Seli, Pärnu County, village in Lääneranna Parish, Pärnu County, Estonia
- Seli, Rae Parish, village in Rae Parish, Harju County, Estonia
- Seli, Rapla County, village in Rapla Parish, Rapla County, Estonia
- Seli, Tallinn, subdistrict of Tallinn, Estonia
- Seliküla, village in Järva Parish, Järva County

Places in Latvia

- Sēļi parish, former municipality of Valmiera district

== People with the surname ==
- Neinar Seli (born 1959), Estonian businessman and politician
