= Soodevahe =

Soodevahe may refer to several places in Estonia:

- Soodevahe, Harju County, village in Rae Parish, Harju County
- Soodevahe, Saare County, village in Torgu Parish, Saare County
