= Seli, Rae Parish =

Village in Estonia

Seli
- village
- Location in Estonia
- Coordinates: 59°20′01″N 25°00′19″E
- Country: Estonia
- County: Harju County
- Municipality: Rae Parish

Population (01.01.2010)
  - Total: 24

Seli (sometimes called also as Selimäe, literally Hill of Seli) is a village in Rae Parish, Harju County in northern Estonia. It is a 3.5 kilometres long chain-like village along Vaida–Pajupea road (road nr 11201). Seli has a population of 24 (as of 1 January 2010).

The administrative territory of the village includes Limu Lake, and eastern border of the village goes along Leivajõgi River. The latters are connected with a 1 kilometre long Trummi ditch.

At the Vaida side of the village Kiviluks Ltd operates Seli gravel mine. Because of this many artificial ponds have been created.

On an 1844-issued map Generalcharte von Ehstland the village has been shown as Sellimae. On an 1881-issued map Karte von Ehstland the place has been shown as Selli. In 1883 issued one of the first Estonian language map Eestimaa kaart (issued by Olevik newspaper) shows the name of the village also as Selli.

== Population ==
Year	2003	2008	2009
Population	13	22	23
