= Limu =

Limu or Limmu may refer to:

== Places ==
- Limmu (woreda), an area in the Oromia Region of Ethiopia
- Limu, Estonia, a village in Estonia
- Limu Lake, Estonia; a lake
- Limu, Gongcheng County, a town in Guangxi, China
- Limu (Haʻapai), islet in Tonga

== Other uses ==
- Limmu, an Assyrian eponym
- Limu (algae), a traditional Polynesian food
- Limu (Tongan mythology), a Tongan creator deity
- Royal Tongan Limu, a juice/supplement product
- Libyan International Medical University
- Liberty Mutual, an American insurance provider utilizing "LiMu" as a shortened branding
- A variety of coffee bean from the Limmu region of Ethiopia; see Coffee production in Ethiopia
