= Kadaka =

Kadaka may refer to several places in Estonia:

- Kadaka, Rae Parish, village in Rae Parish, Harju County
- Kadaka, Lääne County, village in Haapsalu, Lääne County
- Kadaka, Pärnu County, village in Lääneranna Parish, Pärnu County
- Kadaka, Rapla County, village in Kohila Parish, Rapla County
- Kadaka, Tallinn, subdistrict of Mustamäe, Tallinn

== See also ==
- Kataka (disambiguation)
- Gadaka, town in Yobe State, Nigeria
- Kadaga, village in Ādaži Municipality, Latvia
