= Vaidasoo =

Village in Estonia

- village
- Location in Estonia
- Coordinates: 59°16′31″N 25°00′24″E
- Country: Estonia
- County: Harju County
- Municipality: Rae Parish

Population (01.01.2010)
  - Total: 110

Vaidasoo is a village in Rae Parish, Harju County, in northern Estonia. It has a population of 110 (as of 1 January 2010).

== Population ==
Year	1959	1970	1979	1989	1996	2003	2008	2009
Population	70	148	134	85	95	107	109	109
