= Kataka =

Kataka may refer to:

- Kataka (city), a city in the Indian state of Odisha and the state's former capital
- Kataka (wasp), a wasp genus in the subfamily Encyrtinae
- Kataka (film), a 2017 multilingual film by Ravi Basrur

== See also ==
- Kadaka (disambiguation)
