= Väo Power Plant =

Power station in Tallinn, Estonia

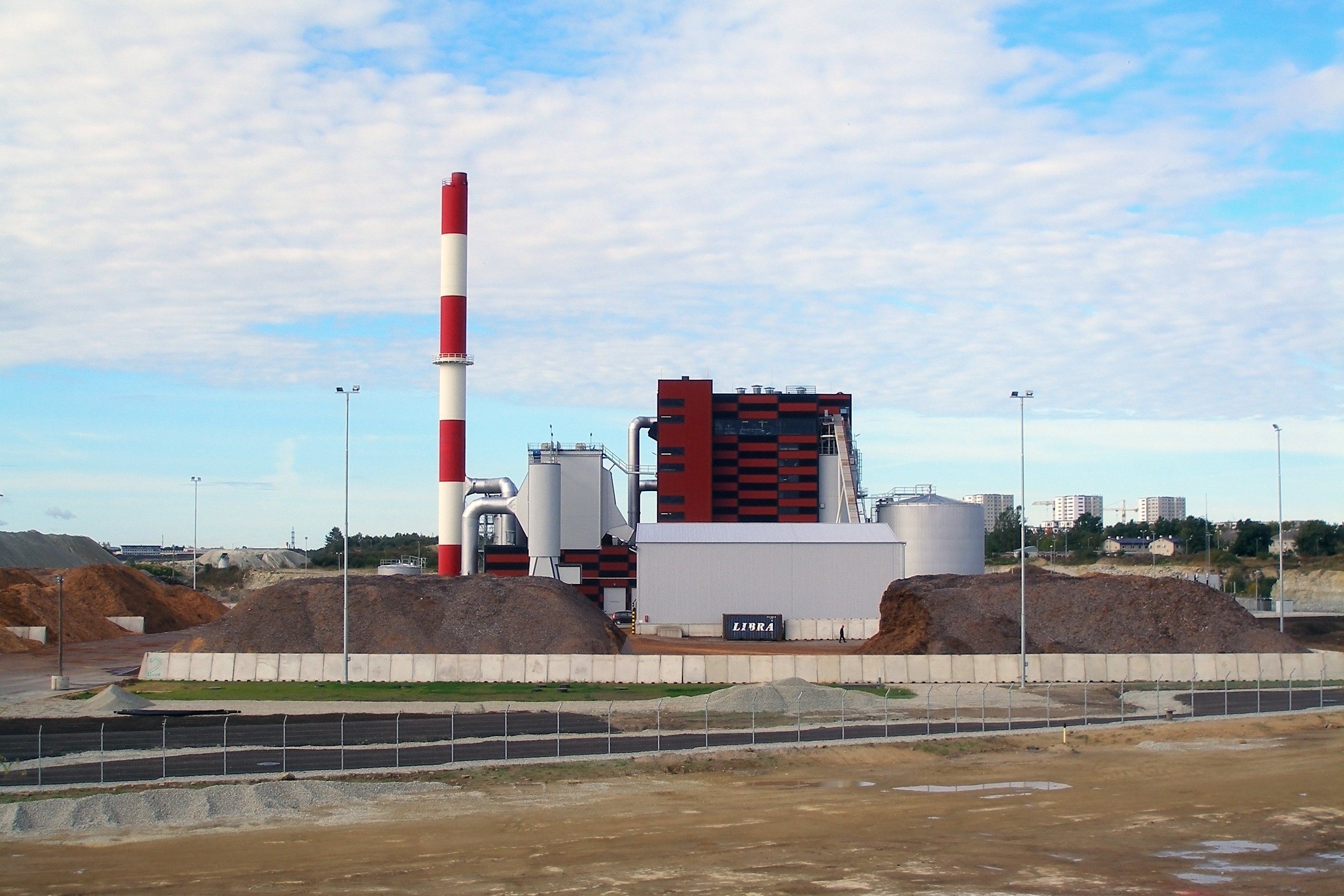
- Väo Power Plant
- Country: Estonia
- Location: Väo, Tallinn
- Coordinates: 59°26′14″N 24°54′23″E
- Status: Operational
- Construction began: 2007 (unit 1); 2014 (unit 2)
- Commission date: 2009 (unit 1); 2016 (unit 2; expected)
- Owner: OÜ Utilitas
- Operator: OÜ Utilitas Tallinna Elektrijaam

Thermal power station
- Primary fuel: Wood chips
- Secondary fuel: Peat
- Cogeneration?: Yes
- Thermal capacity: 49 MW (unit 1); 76.5 MW (unit 2)

Power generation
- Make and model: Siemens (unit 1); MAN (unit 2)
- Nameplate capacity: 25 MW (unit 1); 21.4 MW (unit 2)
- Annual net output: 180 GWh

External links
- Website: www.elektrijaam.ee

The Väo Power Plant (also known as Tallinn Power Plant) is a biomass and peat-fired combined heat and power plant in Tallinn, Estonia. It's located in the eastern end of Tallinn in Väo, in a depleted part of Väo limestone quarry. The plant supplies district heating to Lasnamäe and the central districts of Tallinn.

Construction started in 2007 and the power plant was commissioned in 2009. Originally, the project was started by Estonian businessman Urmas Sõõrumaa and was sold then to an affiliate of Dalkia. Since 2011 majority stake is owned by Estonian businessman Kristjan Rahu company Utilitas.

The power plant has capacity of 25 MW of electrical power and 49 MW of heat. It is fired by wood chips and peat. It has he a 70-metre (230 ft) high flue gas stack, supplied by Finnish company Noviter. The main contractor was KMG Inseneriehitus, turbine was provided by Siemens, fuel handling system provided by BMH Technology Oy, boiler was provided by Noviter and Metso.

In 2014, construction of the Väo 2 power plant with 21.4 MW of electrical power and 76.5 MW of heat capacity started. Like Väo 1, it is fired by wood chips and peat. The main contractor was Axis Technologies. The turbine was supplied by MAN SE. The plant was commissioned in 2016. A 1.1 GWh hot water storage tank started in 2026.

== See also ==
- Energy in Estonia
