= Jüri =

Borough in Estonia

- Small borough
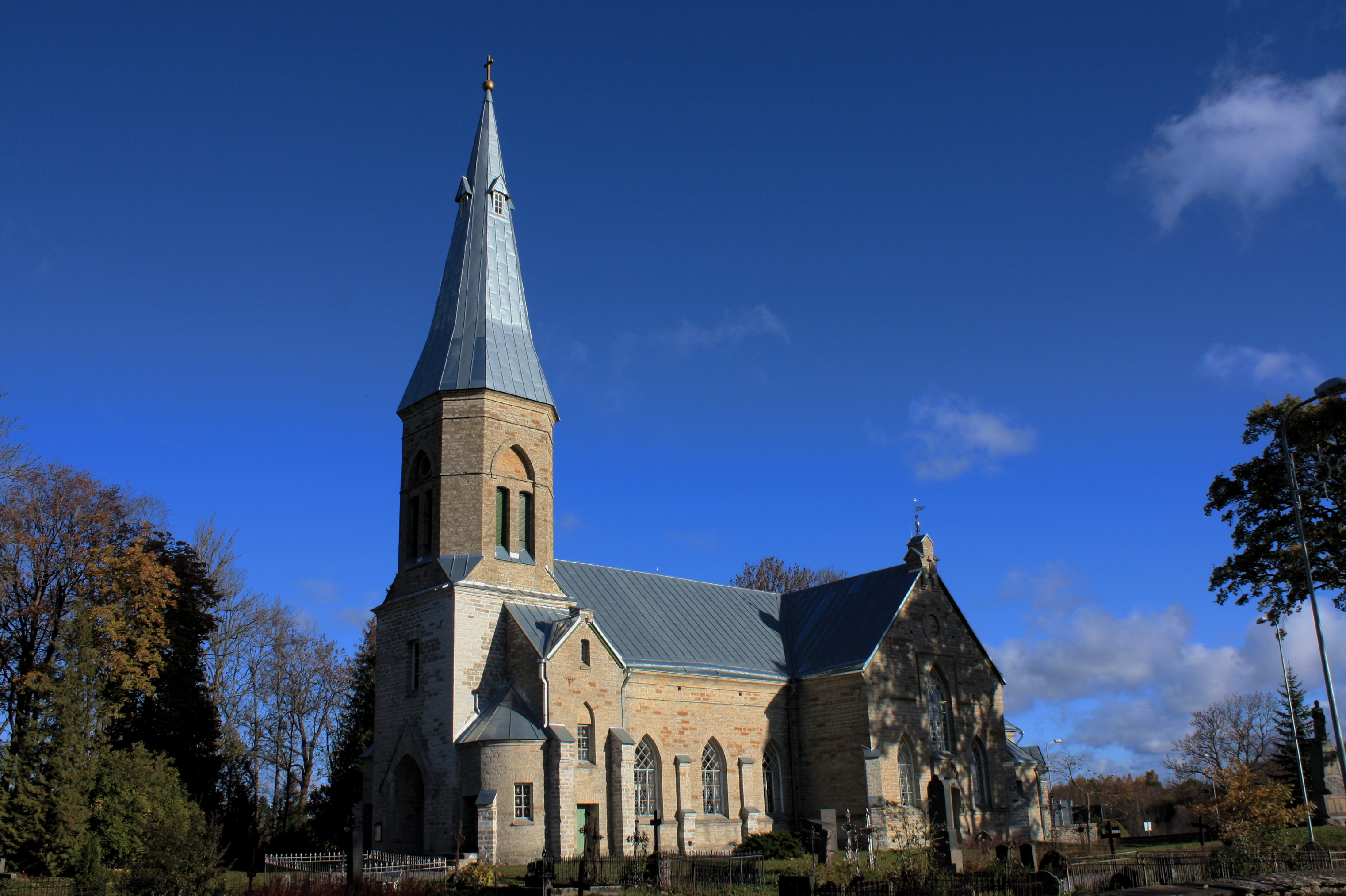
- Jüri church

- Location in Estonia
- Coordinates: 59°21′17″N 24°53′41″E
- Country: Estonia
- County: Harju County
- Municipality: Rae Parish

Population (31.12.2022)
  - Total: 3,594

Jüri (German: Sankt Jürgens) is a small borough (Estonian: alevik) in Harju County, northern Estonia. It is located 12 km (7.5 mi) southeast of the capital Tallinn, by the Tallinn–Tartu road (E263), directly after the intersection with Tallinn Ring Road (nr. 11). Jüri is the administrative centre of Rae Parish. Jüri has a population of 3,594 as of 1 June 2023. In 2011, Jüri was the center of population of Estonia.

Jüri has grown out of two parts: the centre of Sommerling Kolkhoz (former Rosenhagen Manor) in the west and a construction industry base with a residential area (former Jüri church and village) in the east. In the middle there is a protected Lehmja oak grove.

In the 1630s the Rosenhagen Manor (Lehmja since 1917) was established; nowadays the site is located in western Jüri. Today, though the wooden main building has been destroyed, several side buildings such as the workers house have remained.

The earlier Jürgens (Jüri) church was probably located in Karla in 1401. The current church in Jüri was built in 1885 on the site of a medieval church building. From 1713 to 1748, Anton Thor Helle, the translator of the first Estonian Bible, was the pastor in Jürgens.

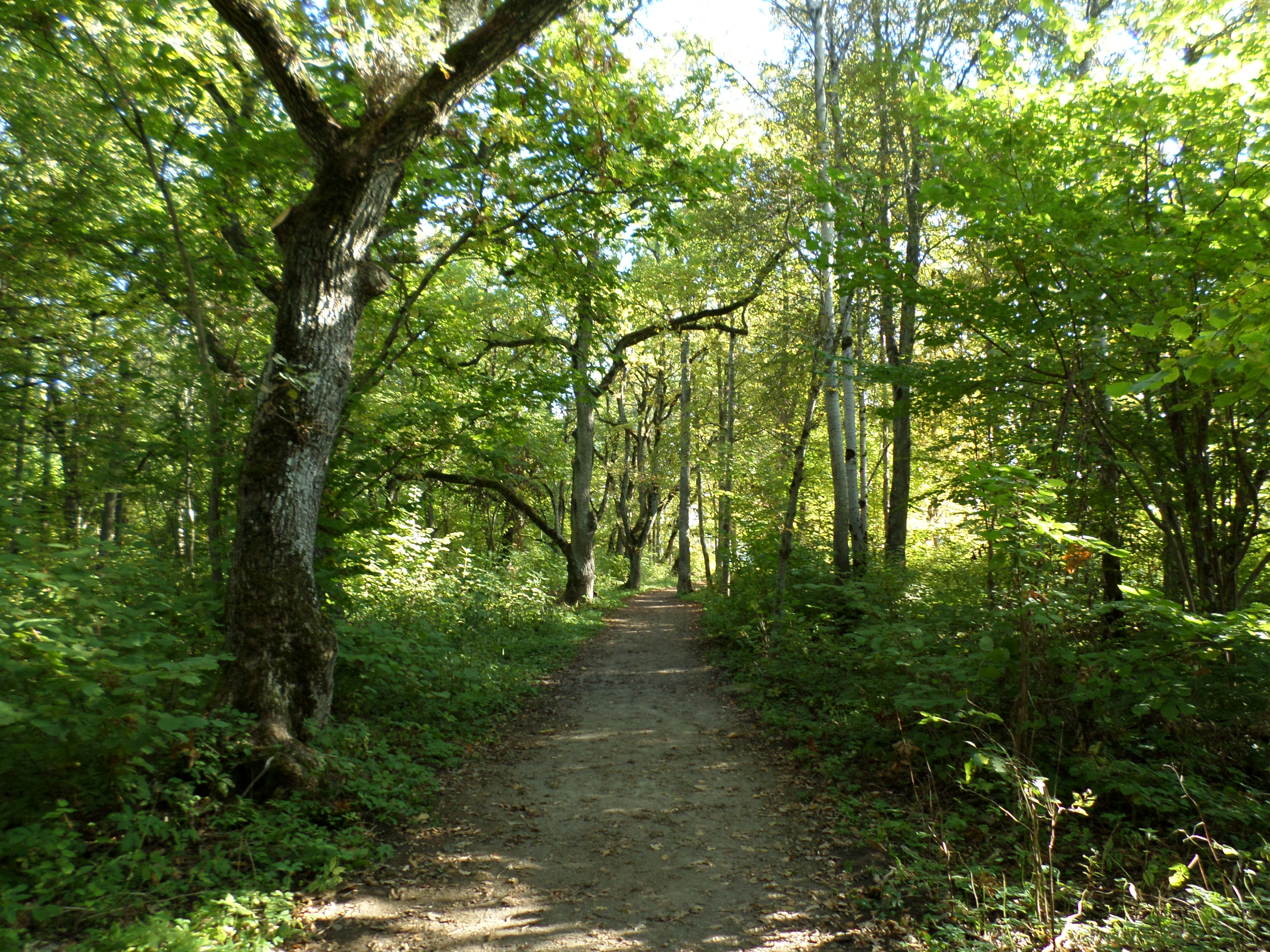
Lehmja oak grove in Jüri

== Demographics ==
Population of Jüri
Year	1959	1970	1979	1989	1996	2003	2007	2009	2010	2012	2014	2015	2016	2017	2018	2019	2020	2021	2022
Population	369	535	1210	2589	2627	2507	3050	3253	3350	3396	3419	3528	3452	3533	3595	3601	3635	3648	3594
