= Uuesalu =

Village in Estonia

- Village
- Location within Estonia
- Coordinates: 59.3625°N 24.8128°E
- Country: Estonia
- County: Harju County
- Parish: Rae Parish
- Time zone: UTC+2 (EET)
  - Summer (DST): UTC+3 (EEST)

Uuesalu is a village in Rae Parish, Harju County in Estonia, being one of the newest villages in Estonia. IBE Estonia OÜ started with real estate development in the area around 2008, and has since built around 400 homes. Over the years, other developers have also built new homes, making it one of the fastest-growing villages in Estonia. The official village was registered in 2013. Active village members have also created an NGO for community projects. The area is one of the biggest residential areas part of Estonian Neighborhood Watch. There is a nursery and a private daycare in the village, number of public playgrounds, recreational area for outdoor sports (volleyball, basketball) as well as a sledging hill and a little lake for swimming both in the summer and winter (ice swimming) - making it a preferential place to live for families with kids and pets. In 2017, an office building was completed, increasing local job opportunities and after-hours activities. Nearest schools and shops are within 5 km radius, there is also public transport connection to Tallinn.
