= Veskitaguse =

Village in Estonia

- village
- Location in Estonia
- Coordinates: 59°19′42″N 24°57′06″E
- Country: Estonia
- County: Harju County
- Municipality: Rae Parish

Population (01.01.2010)
  - Total: 52

Veskitaguse is a village in Rae Parish, Harju County, in northern Estonia. It has a population of 52 (as of 1 January 2010).

== Population ==
Year	2003	2008	2009
Population	28	42	52
