= Urvaste, Harju County =

Village in Estonia

Urvaste
- village
- Location in Estonia
- Coordinates: 59°15′52″N 25°05′44″E
- Country: Estonia
- County: Harju County
- Municipality: Rae Parish

Population (01.01.2010)
  - Total: 47

Urvaste is a village in Rae Parish, Harju County, in northern Estonia. It has a population of 47 (as of 1 January 2010).

== Population ==
Population of Urvaste village
Year	2003	2008	2009
Population	38	50	49
