= Salu, Harju County =

Village in Estonia

Salu
- village
- Location in Estonia
- Coordinates: 59°16′06″N 25°04′42″E
- Country: Estonia
- County: Harju County
- Municipality: Rae Parish

Population (01.01.2010)
  - Total: 76

Salu is a village in Rae Parish, Harju County, in northern Estonia. It has a population of 76 (as of 1 January 2010).

In 2005, the 12th century treasure trove Ubina Hoard was discovered in Salu.

== Population ==
Year	1959	1970	1979	1989	1996	2003	2008	2009
Population	139	156	131	108	121	78	73	74
