= Patika, Harju County =

Village in Estonia

Patika
- village
- Location in Estonia
- Coordinates: 59°18′42″N 24°56′27″E
- Country: Estonia
- County: Harju County
- Municipality: Rae Parish

Population (01.01.2010)
  - Total: 322

Patika is a village in Rae Parish, Harju County, in northern Estonia. On 1 January 2010, it had a population of 322.

== Population ==
| Year | 1959 | 1970 | 1979 | 1989 | 1996 | 2003 | 2008 | 2009 |
|---|---|---|---|---|---|---|---|---|
| Population | 263 | 269 | 193 | 170 | 182 | 164 | 230 | 272 |
