= Kopli, Rae Parish =

Village in Estonia

Kopli
- village
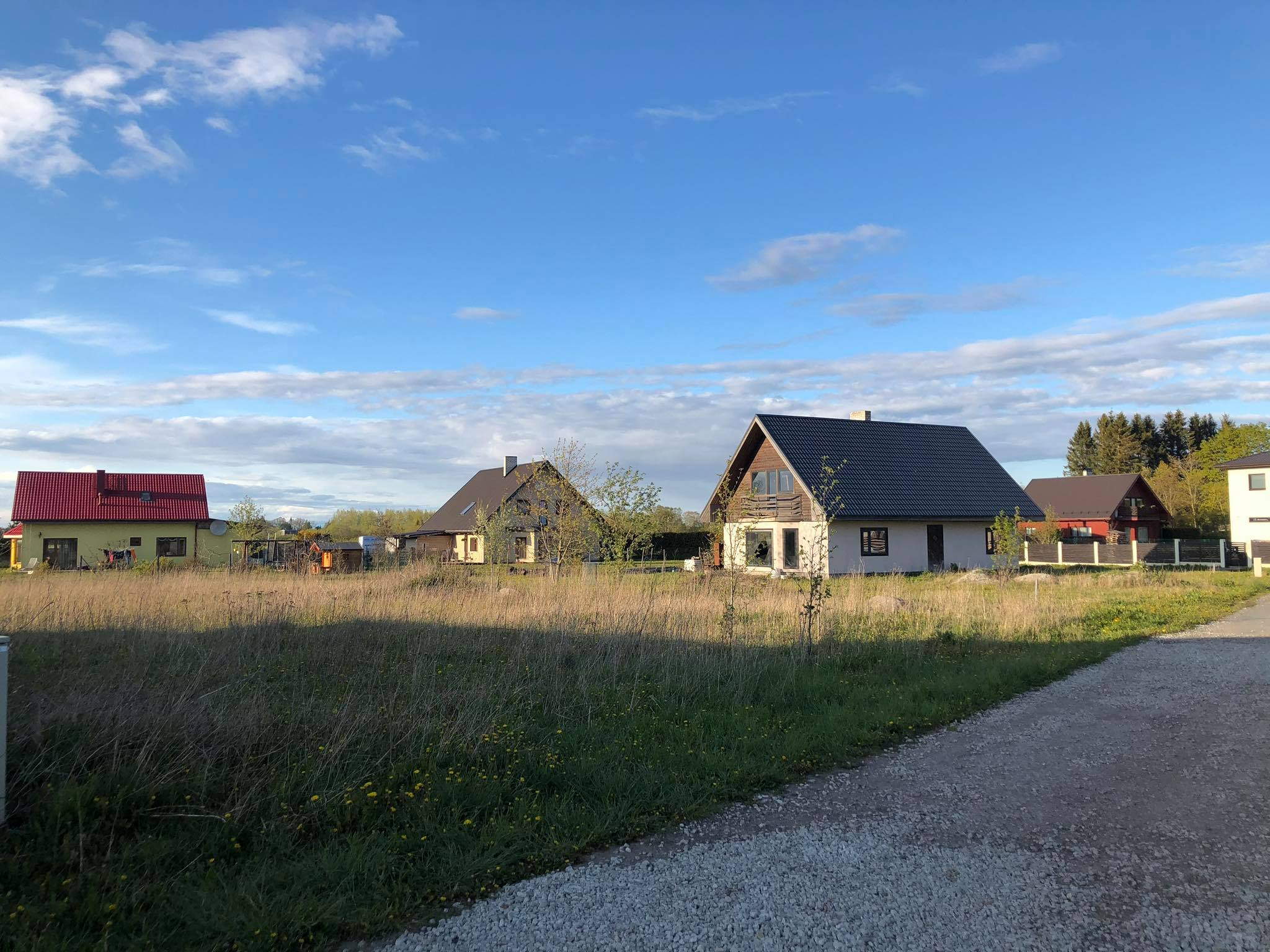
- Kopli village

- Location in Estonia
- Coordinates: 59°24′27″N 24°57′21″E
- Country: Estonia
- County: Harju County
- Municipality: Rae Parish

Population (01.01.2010)
  - Total: 226

Kopli is a village in Rae Parish, Harju County, in northern Estonia. It has a population of 226 (as of 1 January 2010).

== Population ==
Year	1959	1970	1979	1989	1996	2003	2008	2009
Population	122	93	61	56	62	77	161	202
