= Utilitas (company) =

Utility and energy company in Tallinn, Estonia

OÜ Utilitas
- Formerly: OÜ Elekter ja Küte
- Industry: Electricity
- Founded: 2011; 15 years ago in Tallinn, Estonia
- Founder: Kristjan Rahu
- Headquarters: Tallinn, Estonia
- Area served: Estonia
- Key people: Priit Koit (CEO); Kristjan Rahu (Chairman)
- Products: Electrical power Heat
- Services: District heating
- Subsidiaries: AS Utilitas Tallinn; AS Utilitas Eesti; OÜ Utilitas Tallinna Elektrijaam
- Website: www.utilitas.ee/en/

OÜ Utilitas (former name: OÜ Elekter ja Küte) is a utility and energy company located in Tallinn, Estonia. It generates thermal energy and electricity and provides district heating services.

Utilitas is supplying heat in eight Estonian cities: Tallinn, Maardu, Haapsalu, Jõgeva, Keila, Kärdla, Rapla and Valga. In addition to three cogeneration plants, Utilitas has a total of 26 boiler houses and nine solar power plants. Utilitas’ first district cooling system is located in Tallinn, Fahle quarter.

Utilitas operates about 550 kilometres (340 mi) of district heating networks, and heat and power plants in eight cities in Estonia, including Tallinn.

In 1998, Estonian businessman Kristjan Rahu acquired a newly established company AS Eraküte, which started to acquire local heat producers and district heating sets. In 1999, French Dalkia bought 80% stake in Eraküte. In 2001, Eraküte established a subsidiary AS Tallinna Küte for leasing assets of the Tallinn's municipal heating company AS Tallinna Soojus. The deal was completed at the end of 2001.

In 2011, Kristjan Rahu founded OÜ Elekter ja Küte, which acquired from Dalkia OÜ Tallinna Elektrijaam, owner of the Väo Power Plant. One year later Elekter ja Küte bought AS Eraküte and AS Tallinna Küte. In 2013, Elekter ja Küte changed its name to Utilitas. In 2014, Kristjan Rahu gave a 12.32% stake in the company to the company's management. In 2016, all subsidiaries of the company adapted the name Utilitas. In 2018, 85% of Utilitas was acquired by the European Diversified Infrastructure Fund II SPSc (EDIF II), operated by Australian First State Investments.
