= Järveküla, Harju County =

Village in Estonia

Järveküla
- village
- Location in Estonia
- Coordinates: 59°23′20″N 24°47′48″E
- Country: Estonia
- County: Harju County
- Municipality: Rae Parish

Population (2022)
  - Total: 3,210

Järveküla is a village in Rae Parish, Harju County, in northern Estonia. It has a population of 3210 (as of 2022).

== Population ==
Year	1959	1970	1979	1989	1996	2003	2008	2009
Population	77	73	99	66	66	143	363	437
