= Ubina Hoard =

Hoard found in Estonia

- Material: Silver
- Created: 12th Century AD
- Present location: Institute of History, University of Tallinn, Estonia

The Ubina Hoard is a wealth deposit of silver coins and jewelry found in the village of Salu, Harju County in Estonia in 2005. The oldest items in the hoard probably date from the Viking Age but the hoard seems to have been deposited during the beginning of the 12th century. The archaeological site was subjected to looting the day after its discovery, but coins and jewelry fragments later surfaced in Germany and led to successful legal prosecution of the looter and the return of the looted items to the authorities.

== Discovery, looting and legal process ==
The hoard was discovered in Salu village by an amateur archaeologist who on 26 April 2005 informed Estonian authorities of the finding. Experts from the National Heritage Board of Estonia and the University of Tallinn examined the site and decided to initiate a rescue excavation of the area. The excavation would eventually take two weeks. However, already after the first day of excavating on the site and despite efforts to keep the discovery of the site secret, the site was looted. An unknown perpetrator had dug deep holes in the marked excavation plots and left footprints on the site. A car was seen circling the area and its license plate number was recorded by the archaeologists.

Following this incident, it was decided that the archaeological excavation should be protected by guards from the Estonian Defence League, a volunteer force belonging to the Estonia Defence Forces, together with some of the archaeologists. A watch was kept at the site 24 hours a day.

Later in the same year, 108 coins appeared for sale at an auction house in Dortmund, Germany. German police confiscated 42 of the coins and traced the other items to a German art dealer. He reported that he had received the coins from an Estonian national and resident of Pärnu, who was later arrested by Estonian police. Following a trial and turned-down appeal, the Estonian man was sentenced to three years of imprisonment by the Supreme Court of Estonia in 2010 for "destroying a cultural monument in a manner which causes significant damage and embezzlement by a group or a criminal organization". The coins from the hoard that were confiscated by German police were returned to Estonian authorities and deposited with the rest of the hoard at the Institute of History at the University of Tallinn in the Estonian capital Tallinn. The case of Ubina Hoard is an unusual case of where illegal looters in Estonia have been brought to justice. In both Estonia and neighbouring Latvia, illegal plundering of archaeological sites – locally known as "black archaeology" – is a recognised problem.

== Description ==
The archaeological excavation at Ubina uncovered remains of structures, pottery, jewelry and coins. The hoard includes penannular brooches, a possibly Byzantine earring, silver plates and sheet silver fragments. The hoard contains almost 300 coins (sources give the exact number as either 283 or 277) from mints in Germany, England, Arabia, Denmark, Sweden (imitations of Anglo-Saxon coins), Hungary and the Byzantine Empire. The oldest items in the hoard are believed to date from the Viking Age and testify to the trading networks of the age; the deposit was probably buried at the beginning of the 12th century. The hoard has been described as a very rare find in both an Estonian and a European context.
