= Kautjala =

Village in Estonia

- village
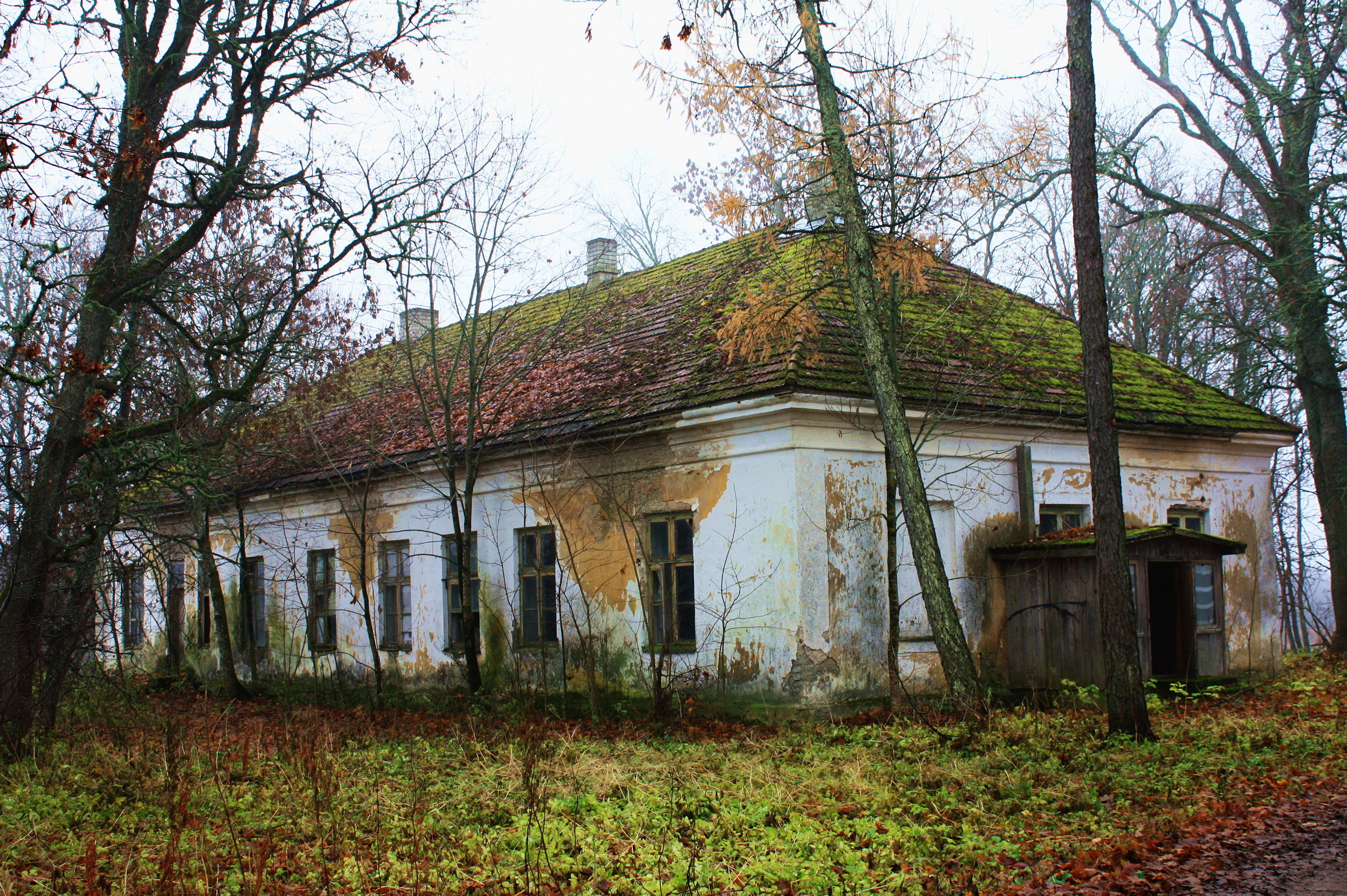
- Kautjala Manor

- Location in Estonia
- Coordinates: 59°20′18″N 24°56′49″E
- Country: Estonia
- County: Harju County
- Municipality: Rae Parish

Population (01.01.2010)
  - Total: 13

Kautjala is a village in Rae Parish, Harju County, in northern Estonia. It has a population of 13 (as of 1 January 2010).

== Population ==
Year	1959	1970	1979	1989	1996	2003	2008	2009
Population	49	21	19	6	5	7	8	13
