= Pikavere, Harju County =

Village in Estonia

Coordinates: 59°16′42″N 25°08′11″E

Pikavere
- Village
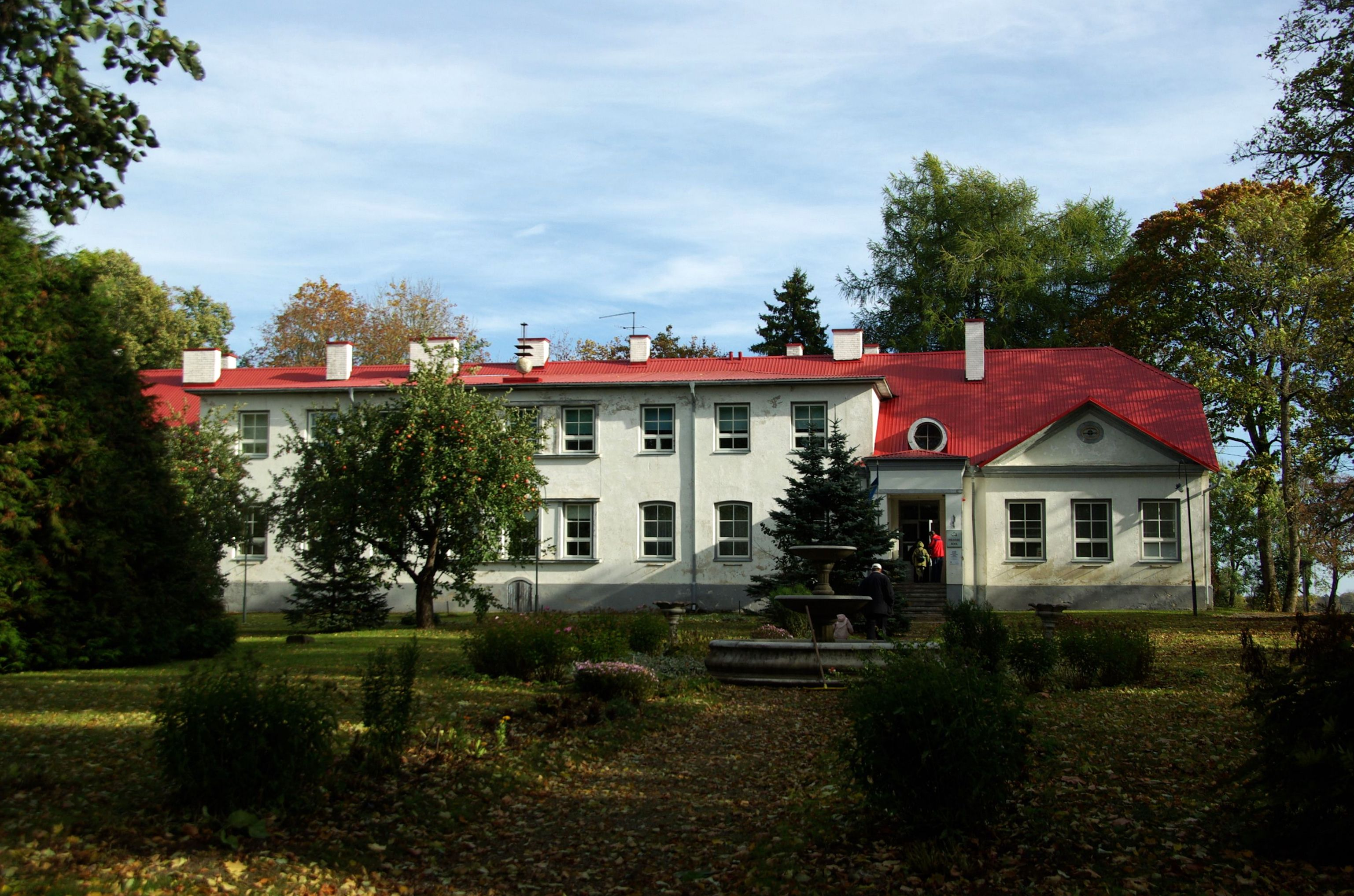
- Pikavere manor. Now, a schoolhouse
- Interactive map of Pikavere
- Country: Estonia
- County: Harju County
- Parish: Raasiku Parish
- Established: 1400s

Population (2019)
  - Total: 70
- Time zone: UTC+2 (EET)
  - Summer (DST): UTC+3 (EEST)

Pikavere is a village in Raasiku Parish, Harju County in northern Estonia.

The Paraspõllu Nature Reserve is located in the northern part of the village. The southern border of the settlement is marked by the Aruvalla–Jägala road. Pikavere Manor (German: Pickfer) was established in 1446 in the village. The single-storey Classicist main building was rebuilt in 1939 and operates as the local kindergarten and primary school.
