= Pildiküla =

Village in Estonia

- village
- Location in Estonia
- Coordinates: 59°21′27″N 24°52′53″E
- Country: Estonia
- County: Harju County
- Municipality: Rae Parish

Population (01.01.2010)
  - Total: 78

Pildiküla is a small village in Rae Parish, Harju County, in northern Estonia. It has a population of 78 (as of 1 January 2010).
