= Kurna, Harju County =

Village in Estonia

Kurna
- village
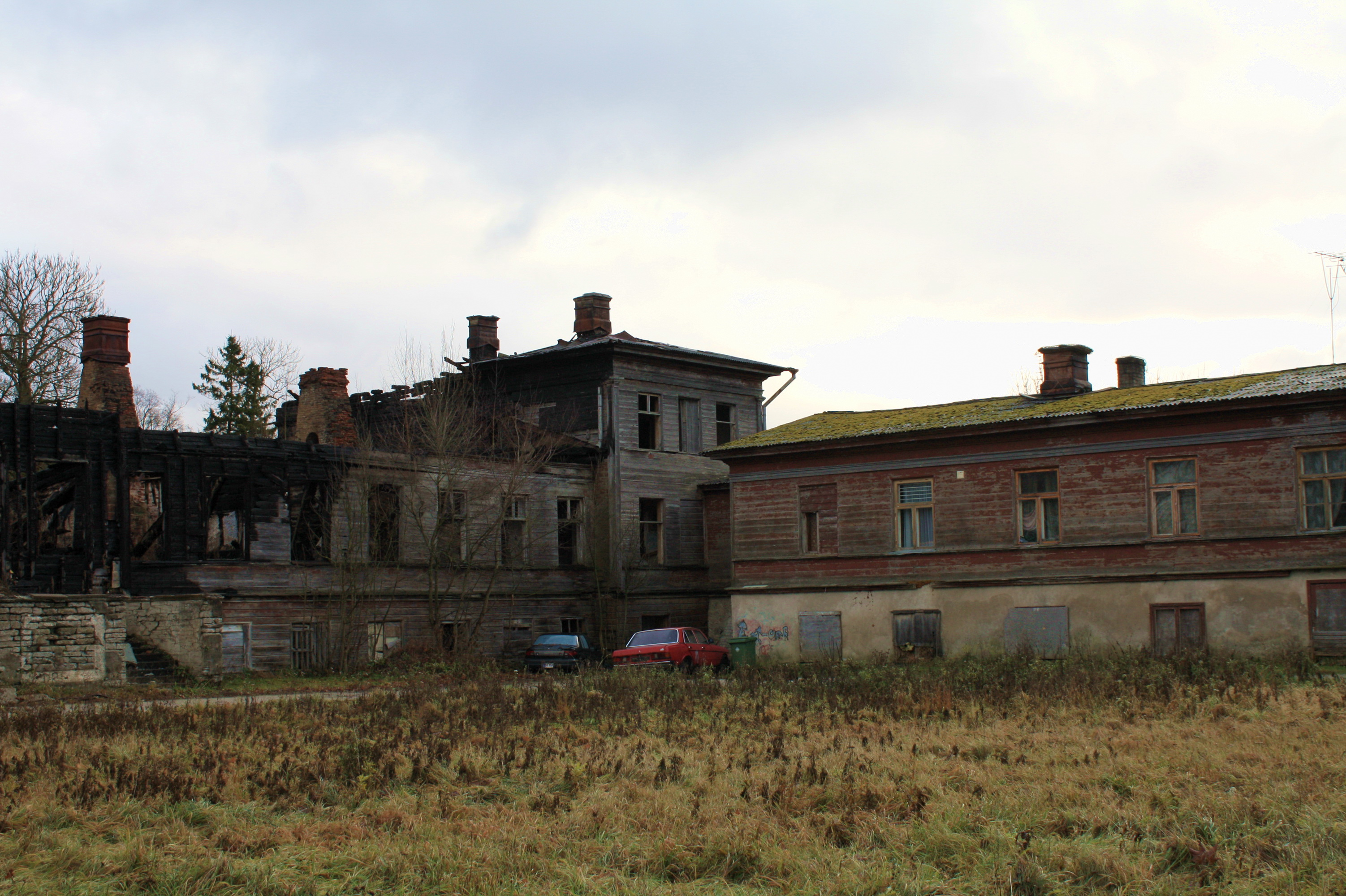
- Kurna Manor

- Location in Estonia
- Coordinates: 59°20′22″N 24°50′26″E
- Country: Estonia
- County: Harju County
- Municipality: Rae Parish

Population (01.01.2010)
  - Total: 95

Kurna is a village in Rae Parish, Harju County, in northern Estonia. It has a population of 95 (as of 1 January 2010).

== Population ==
Year	1959	1970	1979	1989	1996	2003	2008	2009
Population	228	192	125	81	88	96	99	99
