= Õssu =

Village in Estonia

- Village
- Location in Estonia
- Coordinates: 58°22′00″N 26°39′37″E
- Country: Estonia
- County: Tartu County
- Municipality: Kambja Parish

Population (01.09.2010)
  - Total: 163

Õssu is a village in Kambja Parish, Tartu County, Estonia. It borders the city of Tartu to the east and is located by the Tartu–Viljandi road. Õssu has a population of 163 (as of 1 September 2010).
