= Väo =

Subdistrict of Tallinn, Estonia

Coordinates: 59.433117°N 24.892015°E

- Subdistrict of Tallinn
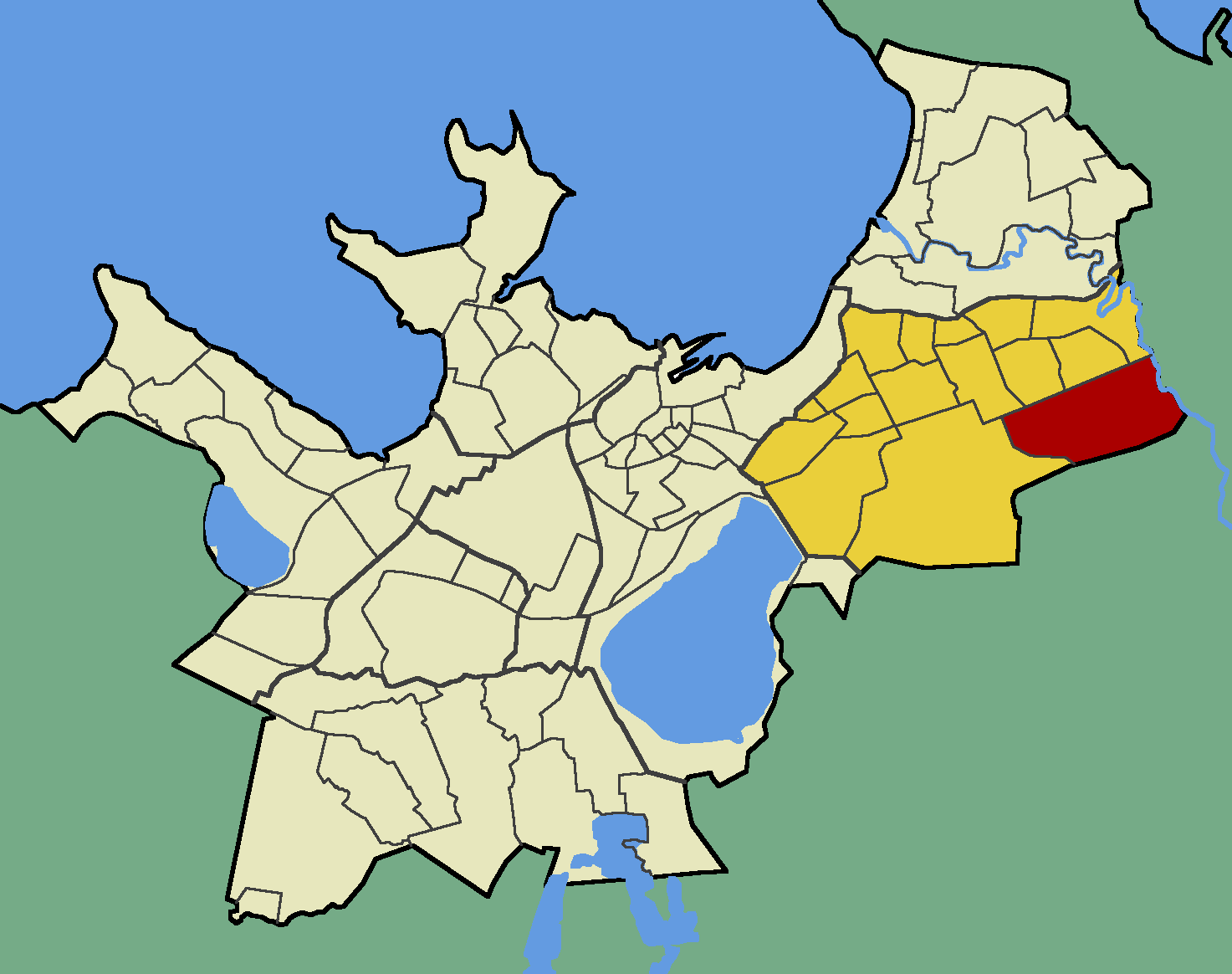
- Väo within Lasnamäe District.
- Country: Estonia
- County: Harju County
- City: Tallinn
- District: Lasnamäe

Population (01.01.2014)
  - Total: 130

Väo is a subdistrict (Estonian: asum) in the district of Lasnamäe, Tallinn, the capital of Estonia. It has a population of 130 (As of 1 January 2014). It is the easternmost subdistrict of Tallinn.

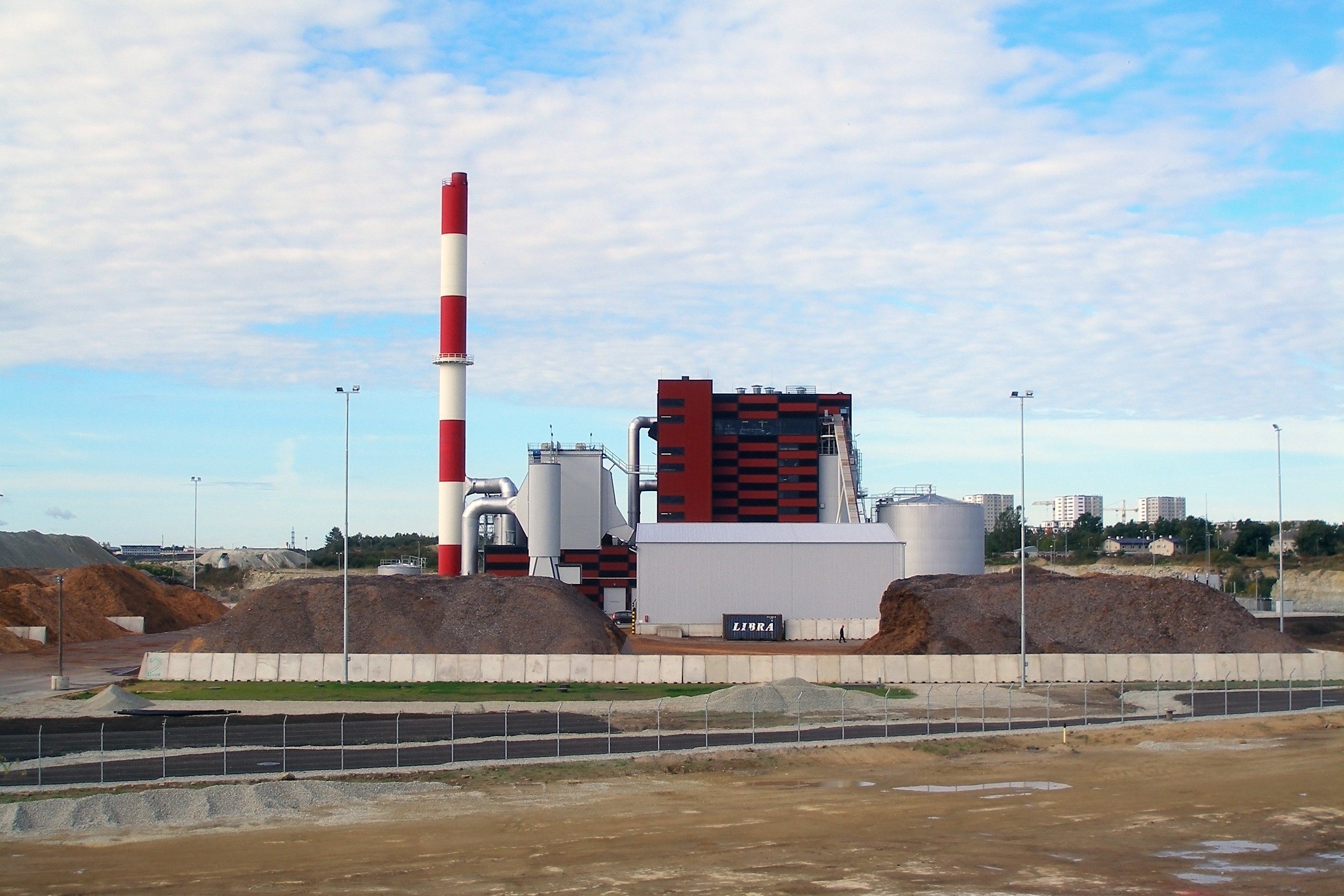
Väo Power Plant

== See also ==
- Lake Tooma
