= Kadaka, Rae Parish =

Village in Estonia

Kadaka
- village
- Location in Estonia
- Coordinates: 59°23′40″N 24°58′04″E
- Country: Estonia
- County: Harju County
- Municipality: Rae Parish

Population (01.01.2010)
  - Total: 38

Kadaka is a village in Rae Parish, Harju County, in northern Estonia. It has a population of 38 (as of 1 January 2010).

== Population ==
Year	1959	1970	1979	1989	1996	2003	2008	2009
Population	105	72	55	40	24	25	34	37
