= Ülejõe, Rae Parish =

Village in Estonia

Ülejõe
- village
- Location in Estonia
- Coordinates: 59°24′38″N 24°55′46″E
- Country: Estonia
- County: Harju County
- Municipality: Rae Parish

Population (01.01.2010)
  - Total: 32

Ülejõe is a village in Rae Parish, Harju County, in northern Estonia. It has a population of 32 (as of 1 January 2010).

== Population ==
| Year | 2003 | 2008 | 2009 |
|---|---|---|---|
| Population | 82 | 95 | 94 |
