= Suursoo =

Village in Estonia

- village
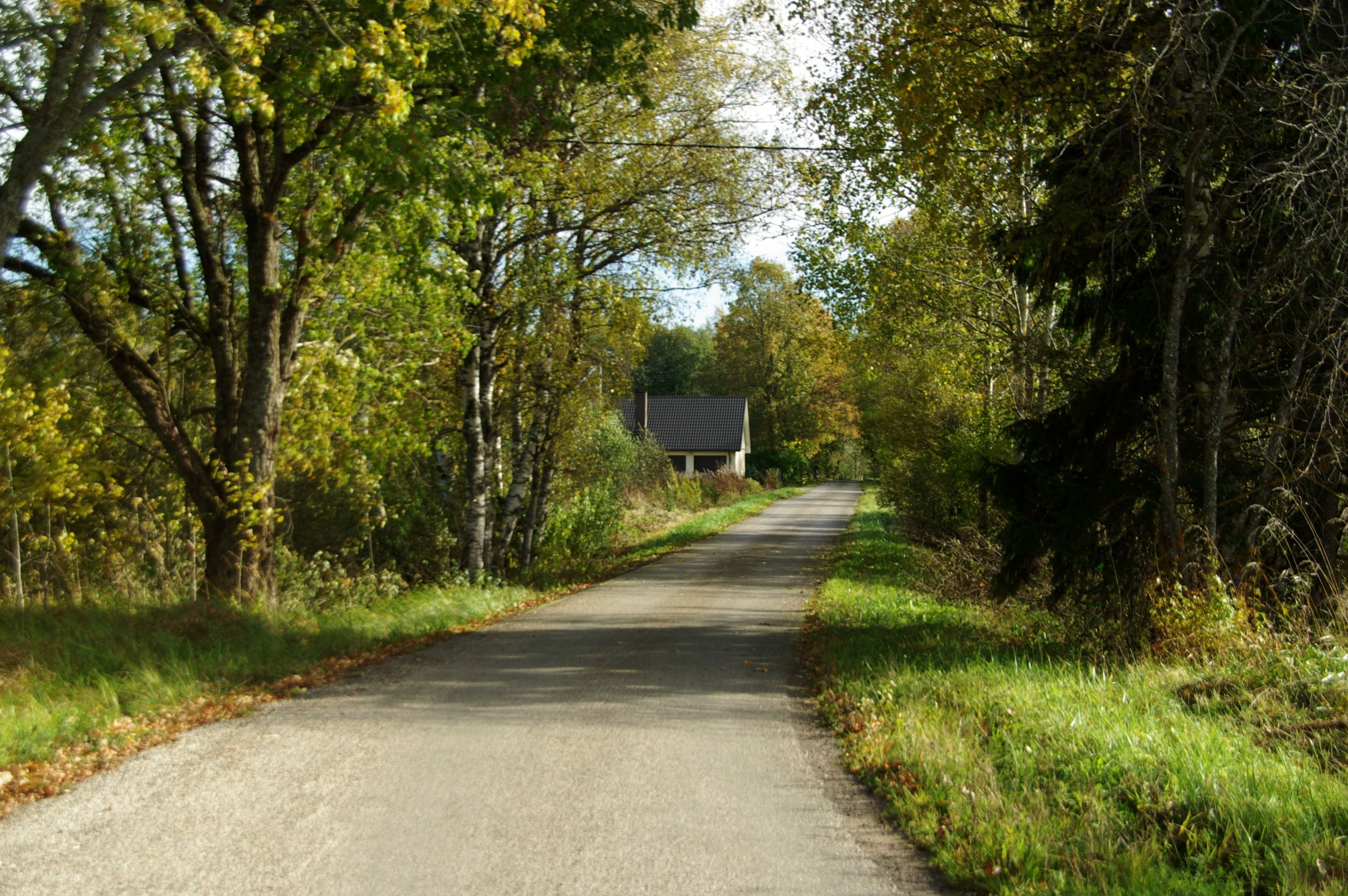
- Village road through Suursoo

- Location in Estonia
- Coordinates: 59°17′29″N 25°03′57″E
- Country: Estonia
- County: Harju County
- Municipality: Rae Parish

Population (01.01.2010)
  - Total: 78

Suursoo is a village in Rae Parish, Harju County, in northern Estonia. It has a population of 78 (as of 1 January 2010).

== Population ==
Suursoo küla elanike arv
Year	1959	1970	1979	1989	1996	2003	2008	2009
Population	96	79	72	60	51	65	70	71
