= Johann Gutslaff =

Baltic-German clergyman, scholar, Estonian language enthusiast

Johann(es) Gutslaff (died 1657 in Tallinn) was a Baltic-German clergyman, scholar, Estonian language enthusiast, Bible translator, and folklore collector.

He studied at Greifswald University (1632) and at Leipzig University (1634).

In 1639 he came to Estonia. There he attended the Faculty of Theology at Tartu University. At the university, he also studied South Estonian. From 1641 to 1656 he was a pastor in Urvaste, and there he wrote all his works.

He died of the plague in 1657 in Tallinn.

== Works ==
In 1648 he compiled the first grammar of South Estonian, Observationes grammaticae circa linguam esthonicam.

Gutslaff wanted to translate the entire Bible into South Estonian, but he did not complete the translation. His translations of the Old Testament up to the First Book of Kings have been preserved. There is also indirect evidence that some parts of the New Testament were translated by Gutslaff.
