= Veneküla =

Village in Estonia

- village
- Location in Estonia
- Coordinates: 59°25′21″N 24°55′11″E
- Country: Estonia
- County: Harju County
- Municipality: Rae Parish

Population (01.01.2010)
  - Total: 30

Veneküla is a village in Rae Parish, Harju County, in northern Estonia. It has a population of 30 (as of 1 January 2010).

== Population ==
Year	1959	1970	1979	1989	1996	2003	2008	2009
Population	97	86	155	117	116	33	26	31
