= Aaviku, Lääne-Viru County =

Village in Estonia

Aaviku
- Village
- Location within Estonia
- Coordinates: 59°30′11″N 26°17′51″E
- Country: Estonia
- County: Lääne-Viru County
- Parish: Haljala Parish
- Time zone: UTC+2 (EET)
  - Summer (DST): UTC+3 (EEST)

Aaviku (German: Awiko) is a village in Haljala Parish, Lääne-Viru County, in northeastern Estonia.
