= Limu, Estonia =

Village in Estonia

Limu
- village
- Location in Estonia
- Coordinates: 59°21′00″N 24°58′41″E
- Country: Estonia
- County: Harju County
- Municipality: Rae Parish

Population (01.01.2010)
  - Total: 41

Limu is a village in Rae Parish, Harju County, in northern Estonia. It has a population of 41 (as of 1 January 2010).

== Population ==
Year	1959	1970	1979	1989	1996	2003	2008	2009
Population	82	39	38	28	29	18	28	39
