= Rae, Harju County =

Village in Estonia

Rae
- village
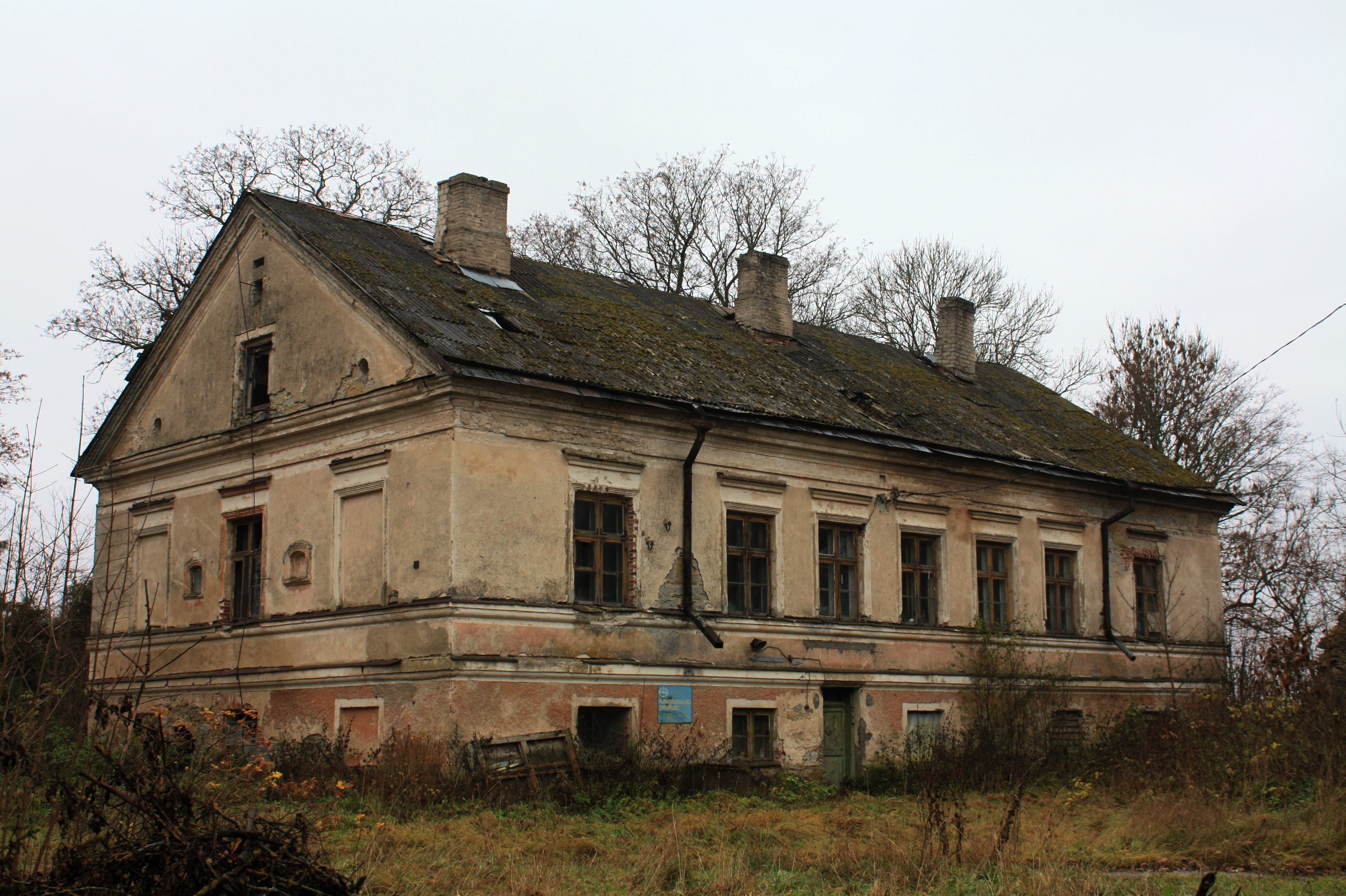
- Rae Manor

- Location in Estonia
- Coordinates: 59°22′50″N 24°53′28″E
- Country: Estonia
- County: Harju County
- Municipality: Rae Parish
- First mentioned: 1390

Population (01.01.2010)
  - Total: 602

Rae is a village in Rae Parish, Harju County, in northern Estonia. It's located just southeast of the capital Tallinn. Rae has a population of 602 (as of 1 January 2010).

Rae Manor (Johannishof) was first mentioned in 1390. From the 16th century it belonged to the St. John's Almshouse, later it was owned by the city council (raad) of Tallinn. The single-story historicist stone main building was constructed in the 1850s.

Rae is bordered by the Tallinn–Tartu road (E263) to the southwest and the Tallinn Ring Road (nr. 11) to the southeast. The northeastern half of the village territory behind the Vaskjala–Ülemiste canal is covered by Rae bog.

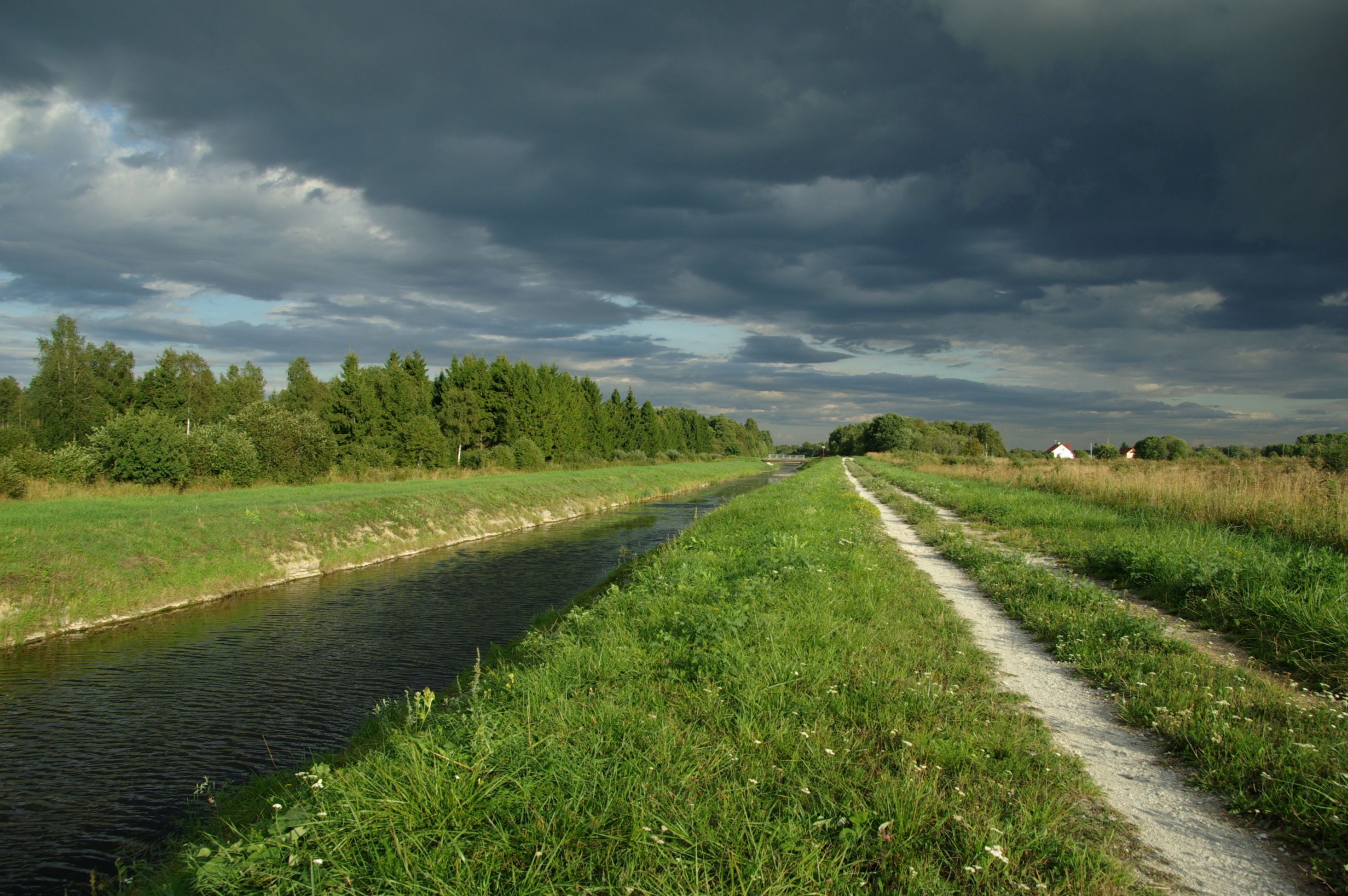
Vaskjala–Ülemiste canal in Rae

== Population ==
Year	1959	1970	1979	1989	1996	2003	2008	2009
Population	160	172	134	103	113	168	438	555
