= Juuliku =

Village in Estonia

Coordinates: 59°19′N 24°37′E

- Village
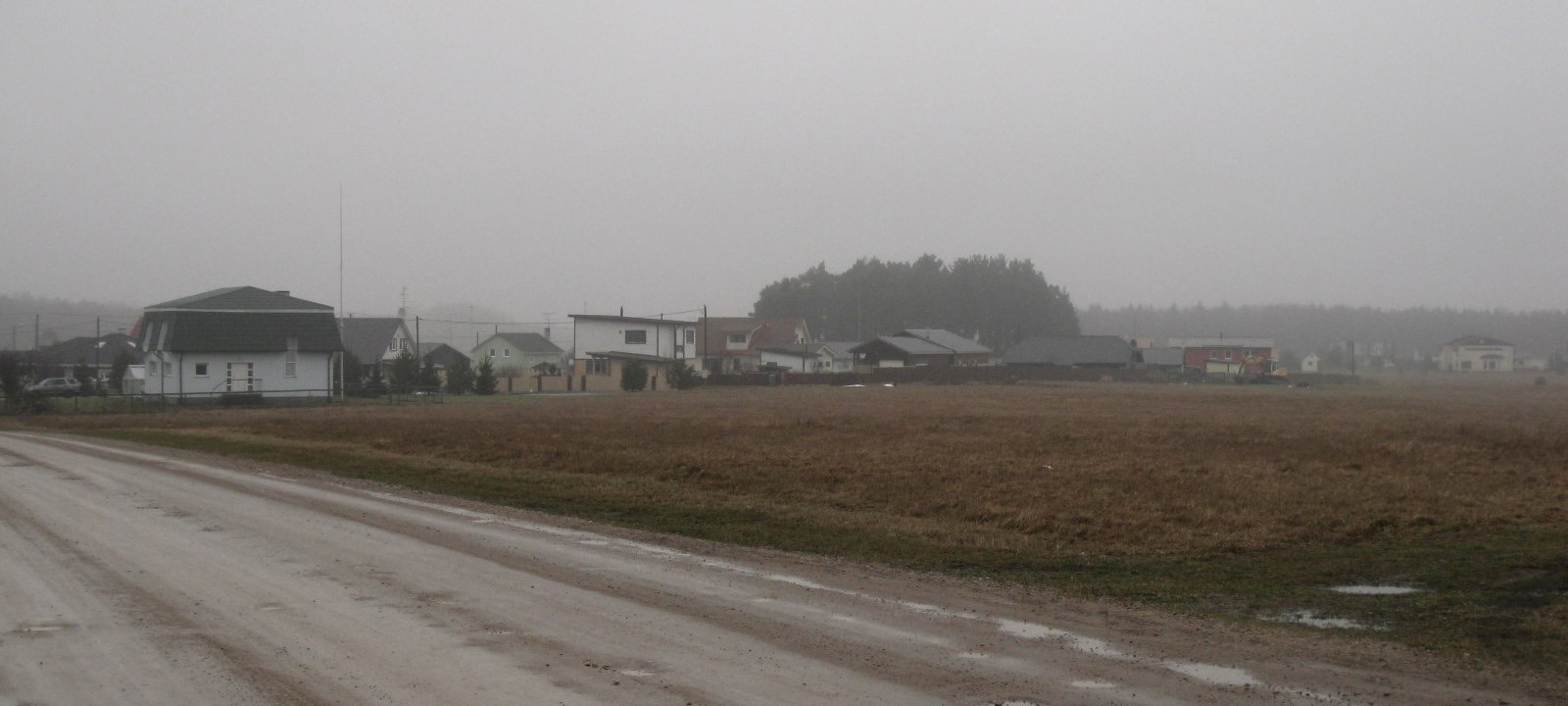
- Juuliku
- Interactive map of Juuliku
- Country: Estonia
- County: Harju County
- Parish: Saku Parish
- Time zone: UTC+2 (EET)
  - Summer (DST): UTC+3 (EEST)

Juuliku is a village in Saku Parish, Harju County in northern Estonia.
