= Karla, Rae Parish =

Village in Estonia

Karla
- village
- Location in Estonia
- Coordinates: 59°21′53″N 24°55′27″E
- Country: Estonia
- County: Harju County
- Municipality: Rae Parish

Population (01.01.2010)
  - Total: 389

Karla is a village in Rae Parish, Harju County, northern Estonia, with a population of 389 as of 1 January 2010.

== Population ==
Year	2003	2008	2009
Population	58	257	347
