= Ülejõe, Järva Parish =

Village in Estonia

Coordinates: 58.80906°N 25.91060°E

Ülejõe
- Village
- Interactive map of Ülejõe
- Country: Estonia
- County: Järva County
- Parish: Järva Parish
- Time zone: UTC+2 (EET)
  - Summer (DST): UTC+3 (EEST)

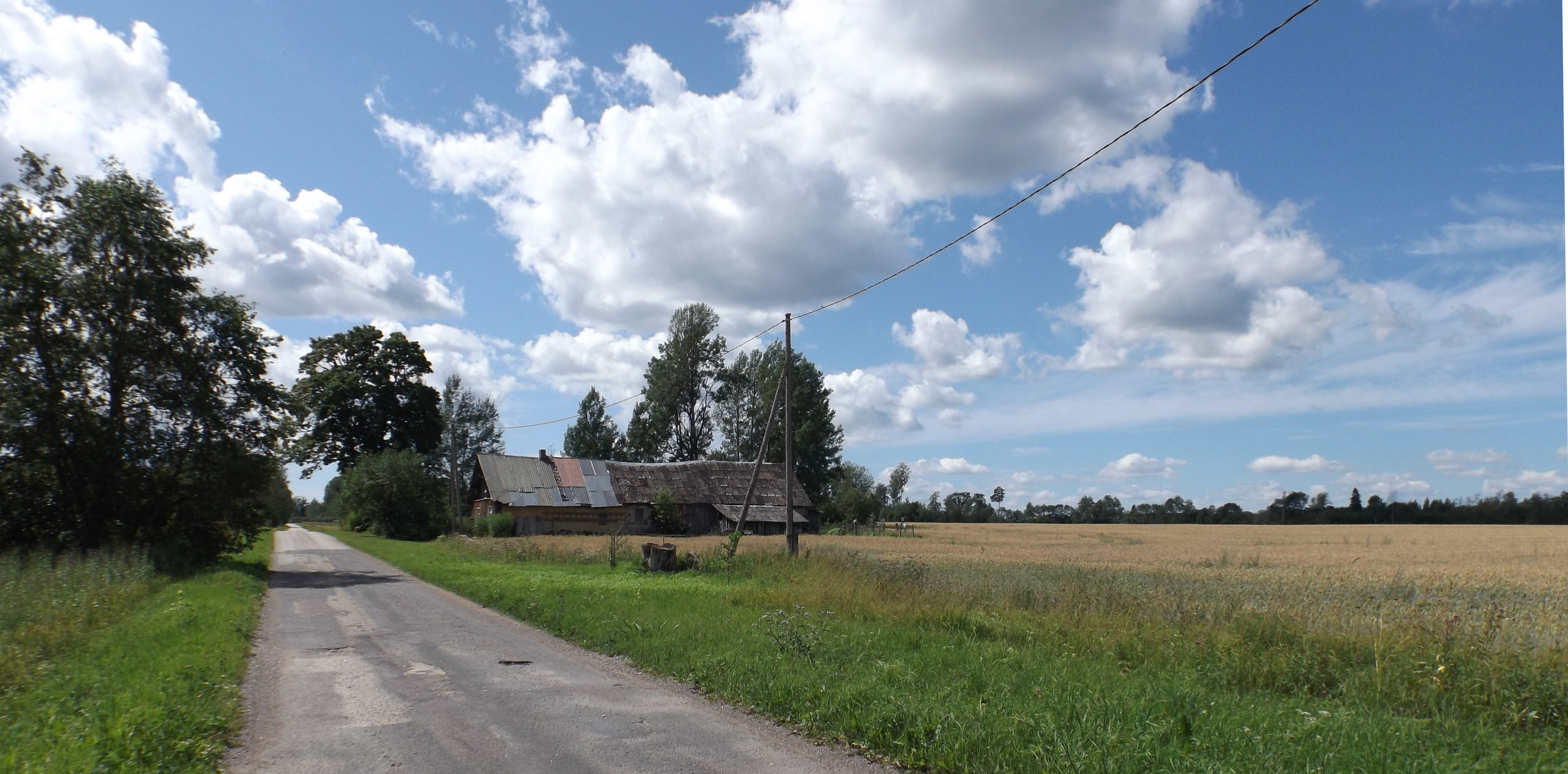
Ülejõe village within Järva Parish

Ülejõe is a village in Järva Parish, Järva County in northern-central Estonia.
