= Aaviku, Harju County =

Village in Estonia

Aaviku
- village
- Location in Estonia
- Coordinates: 59°20′33″N 24°54′37″E
- Country: Estonia
- County: Harju County
- Municipality: Rae Parish

Population (01.01.2010)
  - Total: 194

Aaviku is a village in Rae Parish, Harju County, in northern Estonia. It has a population of 194 (as of 1 January 2010).

== Population ==
Source for the diagram:
