= Soodevahe, Harju County =

Village in Estonia

Soodevahe
- village
- Location in Estonia
- Coordinates: 59°24′46″N 24°53′53″E
- Country: Estonia
- County: Harju County
- Municipality: Rae Parish

Population (01.01.2010)
  - Total: 21

Soodevahe is a village in Rae Parish, Harju County, in northern Estonia. It has a population of 21 (as of 1 January 2010).

== Population ==
Year	1959	1970	1979	1989	1996	2003	2008	2009
Population	72	51	69	32	29	28	22	21
