= Lehmja =

Village in Estonia

- village
- Location in Estonia
- Coordinates: 59°22′07″N 24°52′07″E
- Country: Estonia
- County: Harju County
- Municipality: Rae Parish

Population (01.01.2010)
  - Total: 37

Lehmja is a village in Rae Parish, Harju County, in northern Estonia. It has a population of 37 (as of 1 January 2010).

Kalev confectionery factory is located in Lehmja village.

== Population ==
Year	1959	1970	1979	1989	1996	2003	2008	2009
Population	136	119	128	92	102	39	35	36

== See also ==
- Lehmja Manor
