= Estonian national road 92 =

Road in Estonia

National Road 92
- Põhimaantee 92
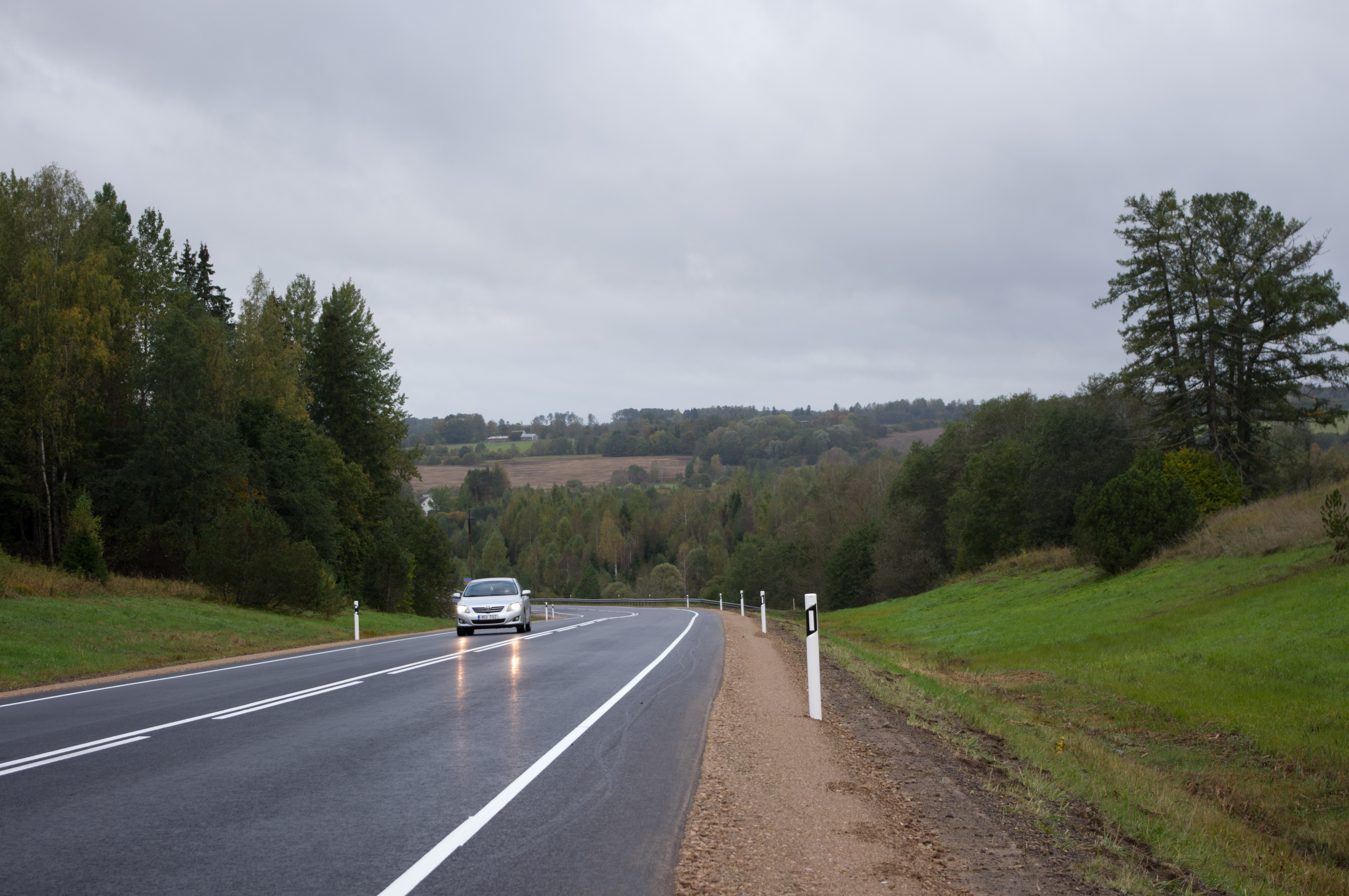

Route information
- Length: 123 km (76 mi)

Major junctions
- From: Tartu
- Sangla Viiratsi; Viljandi Viljandi
- To: Kilingi-Nõmme

Location
- Country: Estonia
- Counties: Tartu County Viljandi County Pärnu County

Highway system
- Transport in Estonia

National Road 92 (also known as Tartu-Viljandi-Kilingi-Nõmme maantee; Tartu-Viljandi-Kilingi-Nõmme highway) begins from the outskirts of Tartu from Õssu. The Tartu-Viljandi-Kilingi-Nõmme highway runs along an east–west path in Estonia. The highway ends outside of Kilingi-Nõmme, where it joins the T6.
