= Assaku =

Borough in Estonia

- Small borough
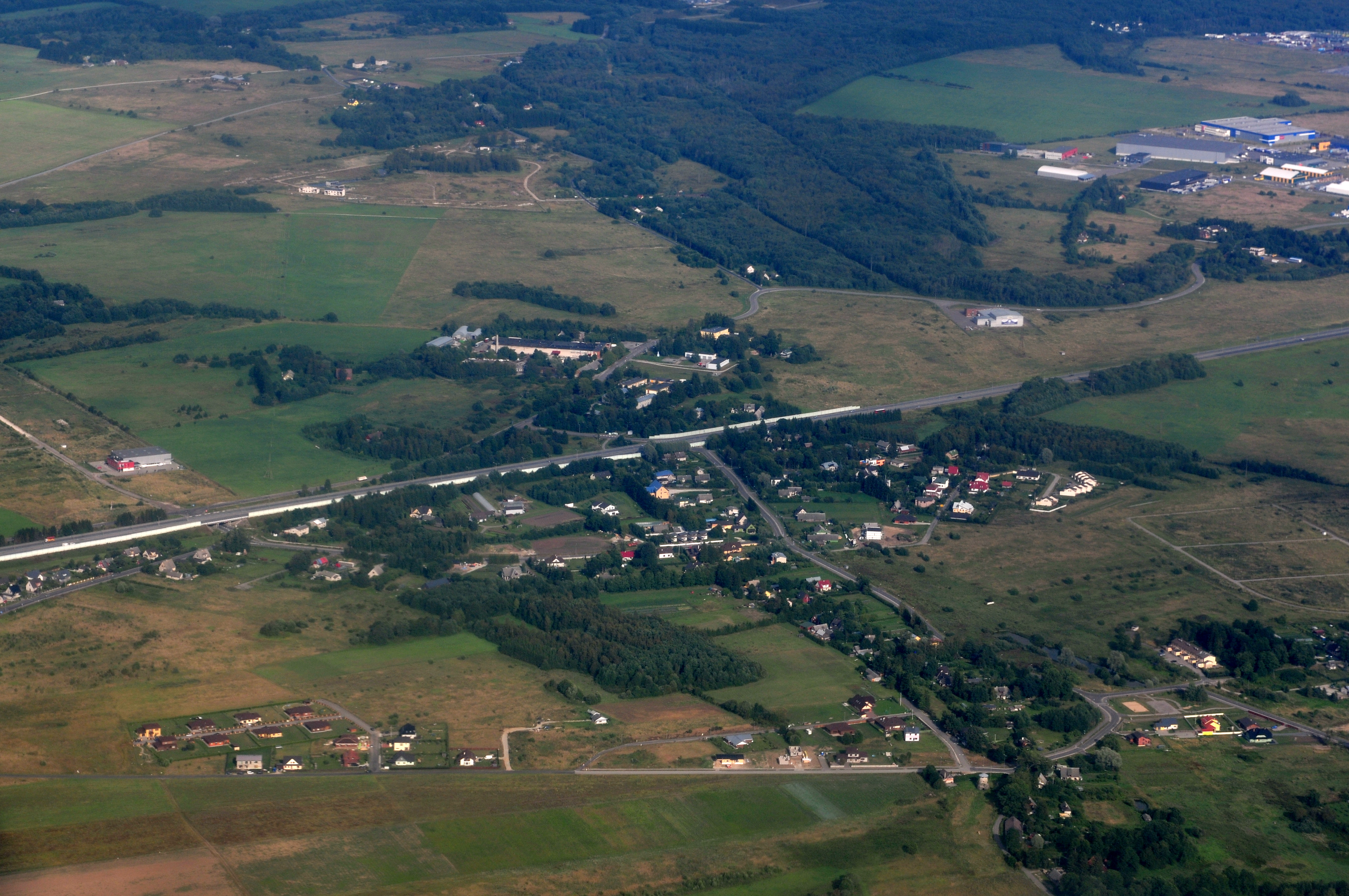

- Location in Estonia
- Coordinates: 59°22′25″N 24°50′32″E
- Country: Estonia
- County: Harju County
- Municipality: Rae Parish

Population (2011 Census)
  - Total: 460

Assaku is a small borough (Estonian: alevik) in Rae Parish, Harju County, northern Estonia. As of the 2011 census, the settlement's population was 460.
