= Vaida, Estonia =

Borough in Estonia

Vaida
- Small borough
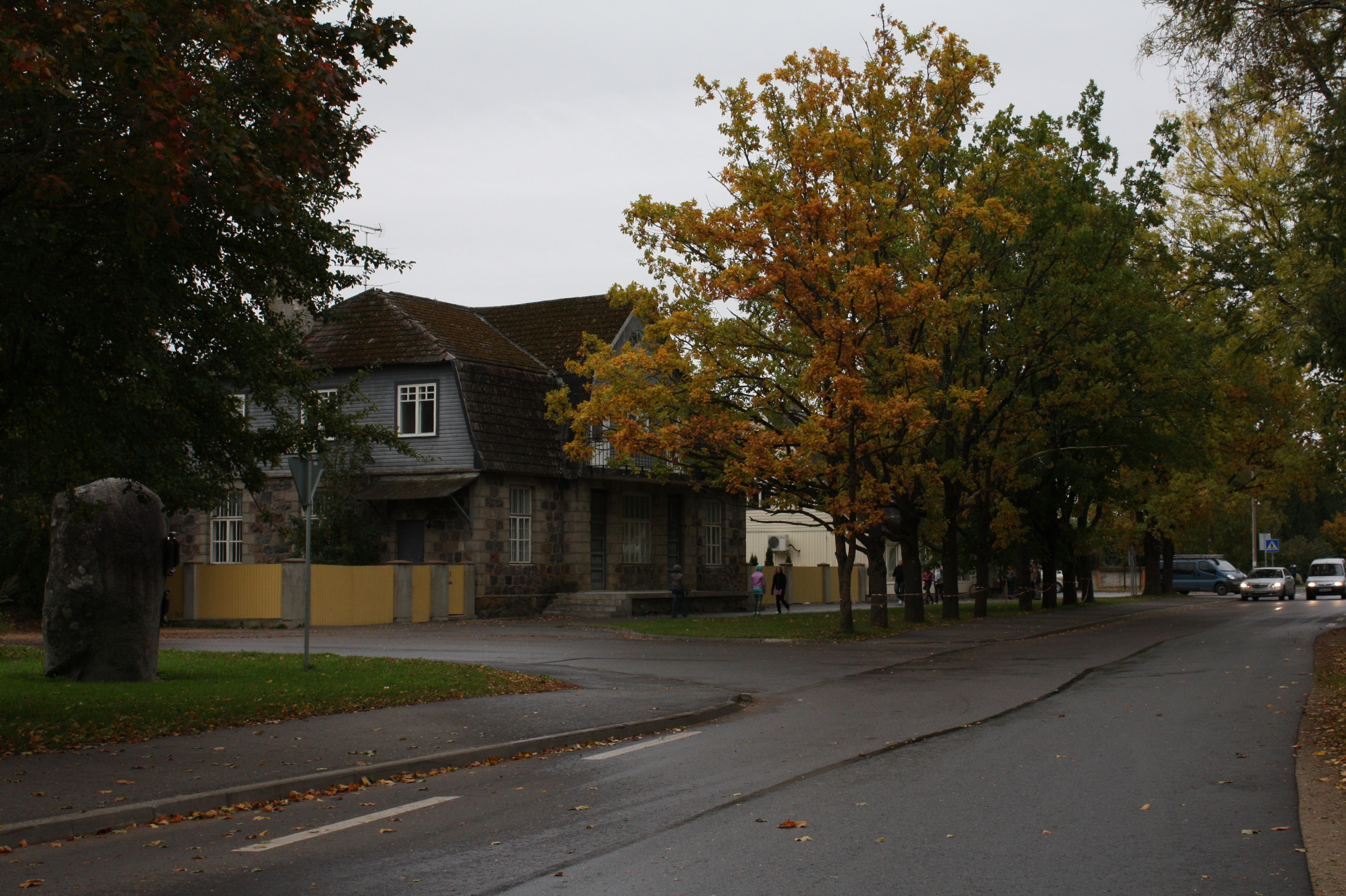
- Centre of Vaida.

- Location in Estonia
- Coordinates: 59°17′08″N 24°58′36″E
- Country: Estonia
- County: Harju County
- Municipality: Rae Parish
- First mentioned: 1241

Population (01.01.2010)
  - Total: 990

Vaida (German: Wait) is a small borough (Estonian: alevik) in Rae Parish, Harju County, northern Estonia. It's located about 21 km (13 mi) southeast of the capital Tallinn, by the Tallinn–Tartu road (E263). Vaida has a population of 990 (as of 1 January 2010).

Vaida was first mentioned in 1241 in the Danish Census Book. Vaida Manor (Wait) was established in the 1630s, during the almost three centuries of existence the manor had many owners. The 1-storey main building from the beginning of the 19th century was burned down during the 1905 Revolution. In 1911 an ethnic Estonian Jaan Saar built a new wooden main building, but this also burned down in 1945. Nowadays mainly the park has remained from the former manor.

In the Soviet times a sovkhoz operated in Vaida.

Nowadays there are primary school, library and a post office in Vaida.
