= Rae Parish =

Municipality of Estonia

Coordinates: 59°23′08″N 24°52′59″E

Rae Parish Rae vald
- Municipality of Estonia
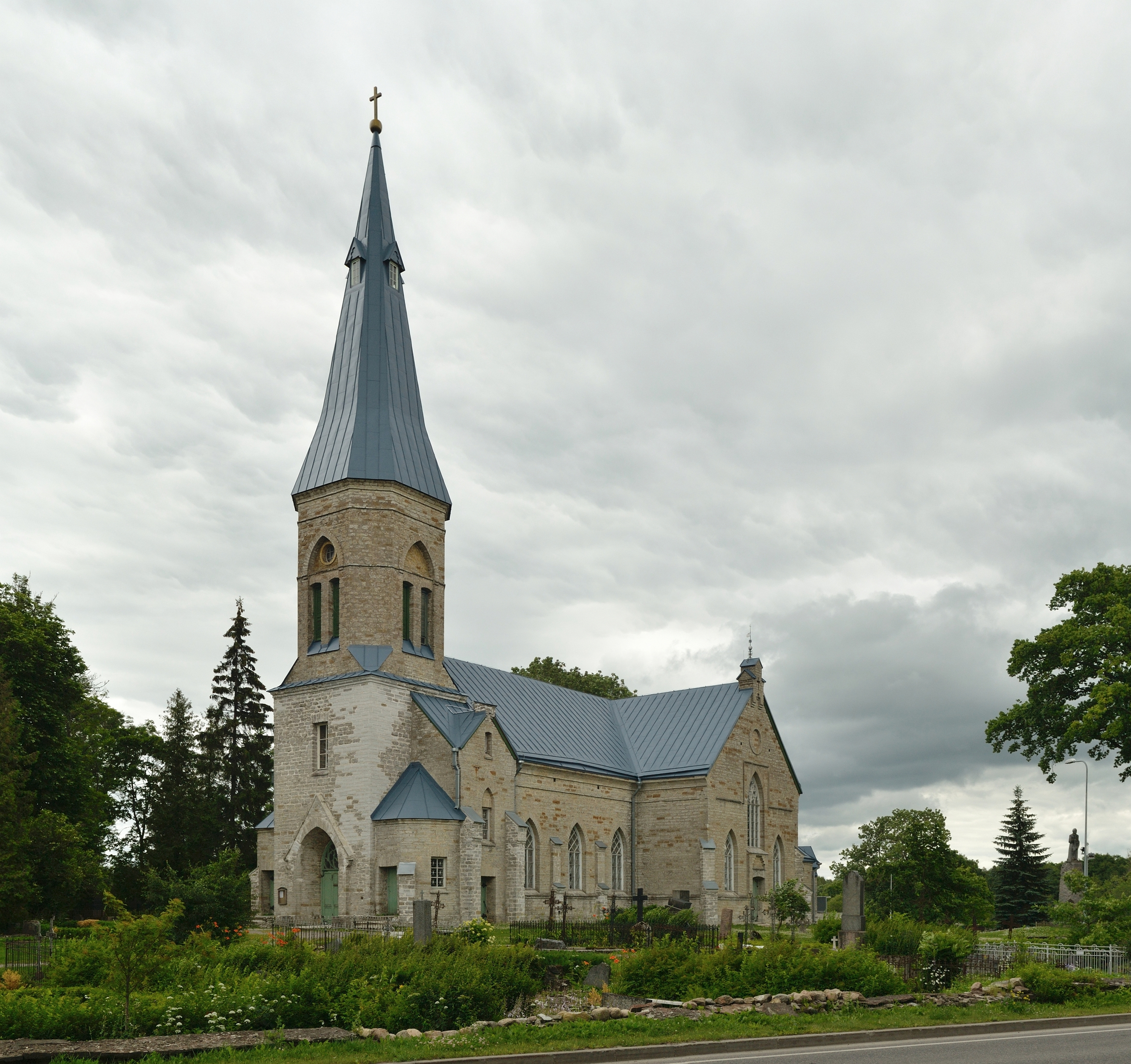
- Jüri church

- Flag Coat of arms

- Rae Parish within Harju County
- Country: Estonia
- County: Harju County
- Administrative centre: Jüri

Government
  - Mayor: Madis Sarik

Area
  - Total: 206.7 km^{2} (79.8 sq mi)

Population (31.12.2022)
  - Total: 23,145
  - Density: 112.0/km^{2} (290.0/sq mi)
- ISO 3166 code: EE-653
- Website: www.rae.ee

Rae Parish (Estonian: Rae vald) is a rural municipality in northern Estonia. It is a part of Harju County. The municipality has a population of 23,145 (as of 31 December 2022) and covers an area of 206.7 km^{2}. The population density is 111.974/km^{2} (290.01/sq mi).

== Settlements ==
Administrative centre of the municipality is Jüri, a small borough. The other biggest populated places are Vaida, Assaku, Lagedi and Peetri small boroughs. The rest of the settlements are villages: Aaviku, Aruvalla, Järveküla, Kadaka, Karla, Kautjala, Kopli, Kurna, Lehmja, Limu, Pajupea, Patika, Pildiküla, Rae, Salu, Seli, Soodevahe, Suuresta, Suursoo, Tuulevälja, Ülejõe, Urvaste, Uuesalu, Vaidasoo, Vaskjala, Veneküla and Veskitaguse. There are altogether five small boroughs plus 27 villages and hamlets in Rae Parish.

The current mayor (vallavanem) is Gerli Lehe (Isamaa).

== Religion ==
Out of older than fifteen years residents of Rae parish, 82.2 per cent are religiously unaffiliated, 7.7 per cent identify as Orthodox, Lutherans make up 6.8 per cent of the population, other Christians 1.5 per cent and 1.8 per cent of the population follows other religions or did not specify their religious affiliation.

== Notable people ==
- Eduard Seren (1900 in Rae Parish – 1941), a sports shooter and one of the leaders of Forest Brothers
- Andres Vooremaa (born 1944 in Rae Parish - 2022), chess player, won the Estonian Chess Championship in 1972 & 1973
- Heino Puuste (born 1955 in Lagedi), javelin thrower, finished fourth at the 1980 Summer Olympics
