= Harju County =

County of Estonia

Coordinates: 59°20′N 25°00′E

- County
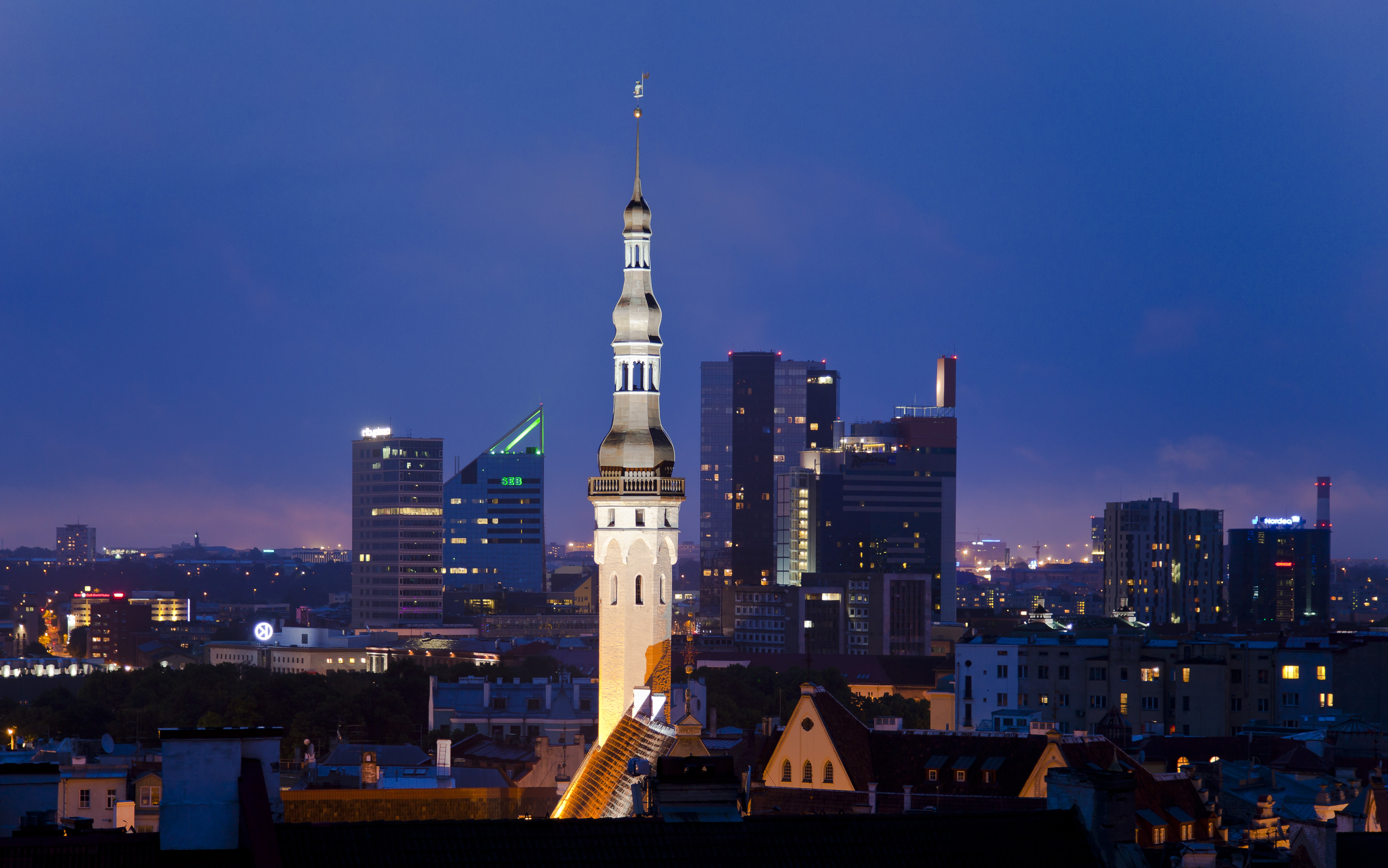
- Tallinn business district at night

- Flag Coat of arms

- Country: Estonia
- Capital: Tallinn
- Other towns: Keila, Kehra, Loksa, Maardu, Saue, and Paldiski

Area
  - Total: 4,333 km^{2} (1,673 sq mi)

Population (2026)
  - Total: 644,758
  - Rank: 1st
  - Density: 149/km^{2} (390/sq mi)

Ethnicity
  - Estonians: 59.34%
  - Russians: 27.1%
  - other: 13.56%

GDP (nominal, 2024)
  - Total: €25.164 billion
  - Per capita: €38,914
- ISO 3166 code: EE-37

Harju County (Estonian: Harju maakond or Harjumaa) is one of the fifteen counties of Estonia. It is located in northern Estonia, on the southern coast of the Gulf of Finland, and it borders Lääne-Viru County to the east, Järva County to the southeast, Rapla County to the south, and Lääne County to the southwest. The capital and largest city of Estonia, Tallinn, is located in Harju County. Harju is the largest county in Estonia in terms of population, as almost half (45%) of Estonia's population lives in the county.

== History ==
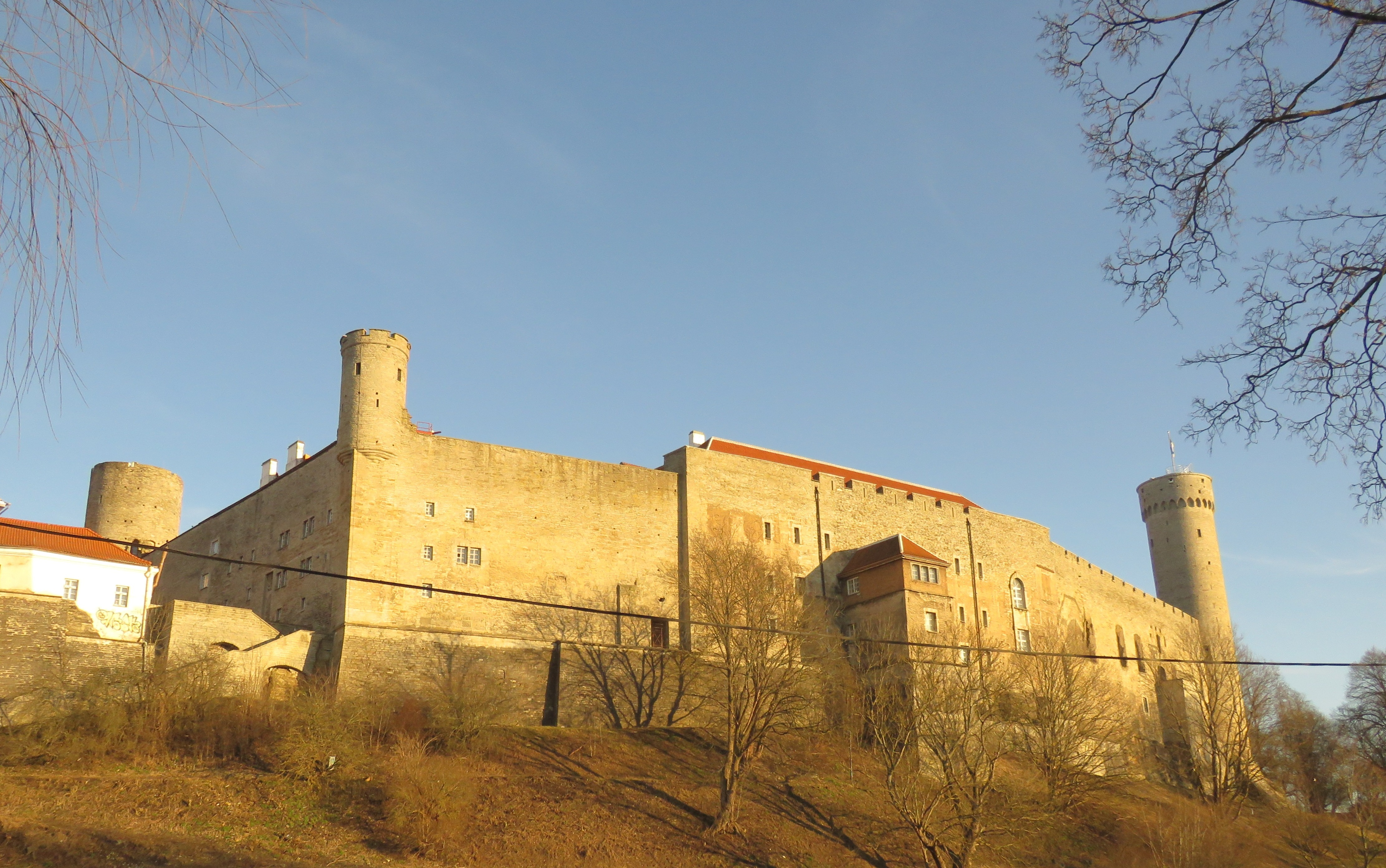
Toompea Castle in Tallinn. Its Latin name Castrum Danorum might refer to the origin of the names "Tallinn" and "Lindanise", meaning "Danish Town" or "Danish Castle".

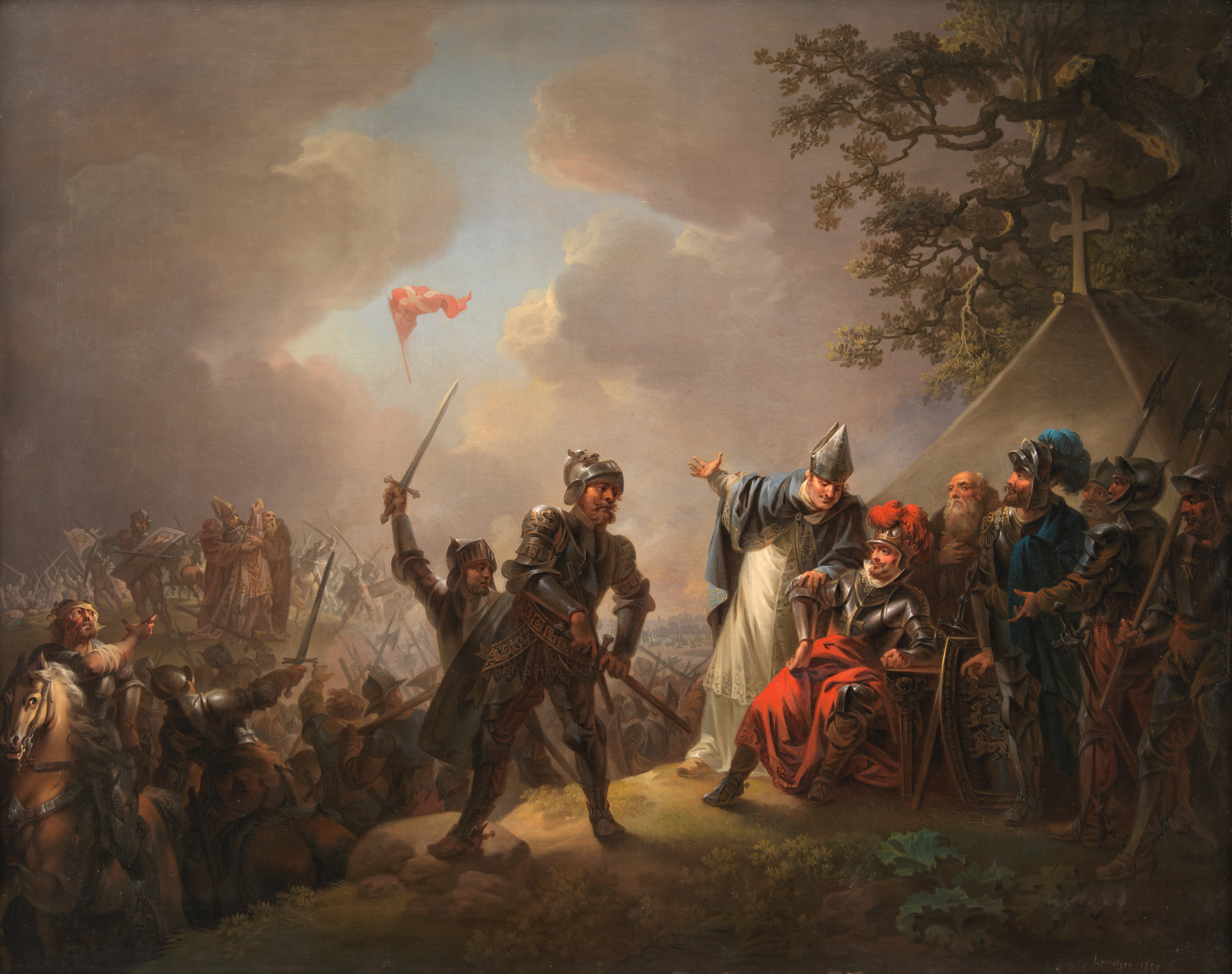
The Flag of Denmark (Dannebrog) as falling from the sky during the Battle of Lindanise in 1219. It is now depicted on the coat of arms of both Tallinn and Harju County.

=== Ancient history ===
The territory of modern Harju County consists mostly of two ancient Estonian counties: Revala, around what is now Tallinn, and partly Harjumaa, which was located south of Revala and is presently mostly in Rapla County. Lindanise, then a small trading post at the Gulf of Finland, served as the capital of Revala. It eventually grew into the mostly German-populated Hanseatic town of Reval and later into the Estonian capital, Tallinn.

=== Conquest ===
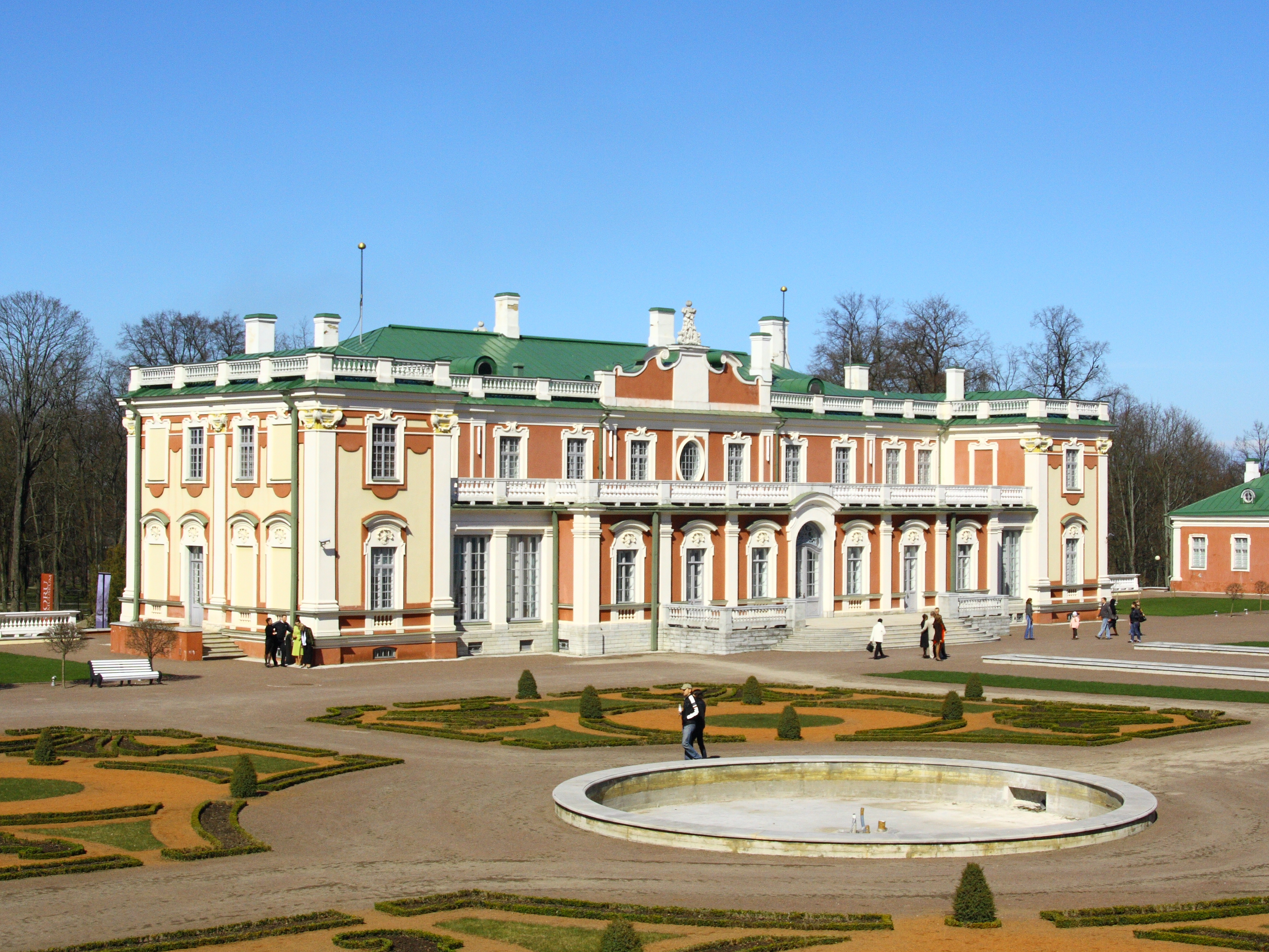
Russian Tsar Peter I started the construction of Kadriorg Palace near Tallinn and named it after his wife Catherine I (Catherinethal).

In 1219, the Danish King, Valdemar II, landed in Lindanise (Danish: Lyndanisse) and conquered both Revala and Harju counties, while the inhabitants were forced into Christianity. At the end of the Livonian Crusade (1208–1227 in Estonia), both counties were captured by the Order of the Sword Brothers until given back to Denmark with the Treaty of Stensby in 1238.

The Danes built the Toompea Castle (Castrum Danorum) on Toompea Hill in Tallinn, which quickly became the biggest settlement in Estonia. In 1248, it was the first settlement in Estonia to receive its town rights, and in 1285 it became the northernmost member of the Hanseatic League.

German dominance led to the St. George's Night Uprising, which broke out in 1343 with the burning of Padise Abbey in modern Padise Parish. The uprising led Denmark to sell its possessions in Northern Estonia to the Livonian Order. In 1561, after the outbreak of the Livonian War, the nobility of North Estonia and the Tallinn Town Council declared loyalty to Sweden. Tallinn and other Swedish-occupied territories gained during warfare were secured by the Treaty of Plyussa.

During the Great Northern War, Harju was one of the few regions in Estonia untouched by warfare for a long time. Nonetheless, Harju County was greatly affected by the 1710-1713 Plague that killed more than eighty percent of the county's population. Russian forces finally arrived in 1710 and laid siege to Tallinn for a month until the Swedish garrison surrendered, thus ending the Great Northern War in Estonia. Russian rule was secured with the Treaty of Nystad in 1721. The plague raged on for several years, eventually leaving several parts of the county completely empty of human habitation.

=== Russian rule ===
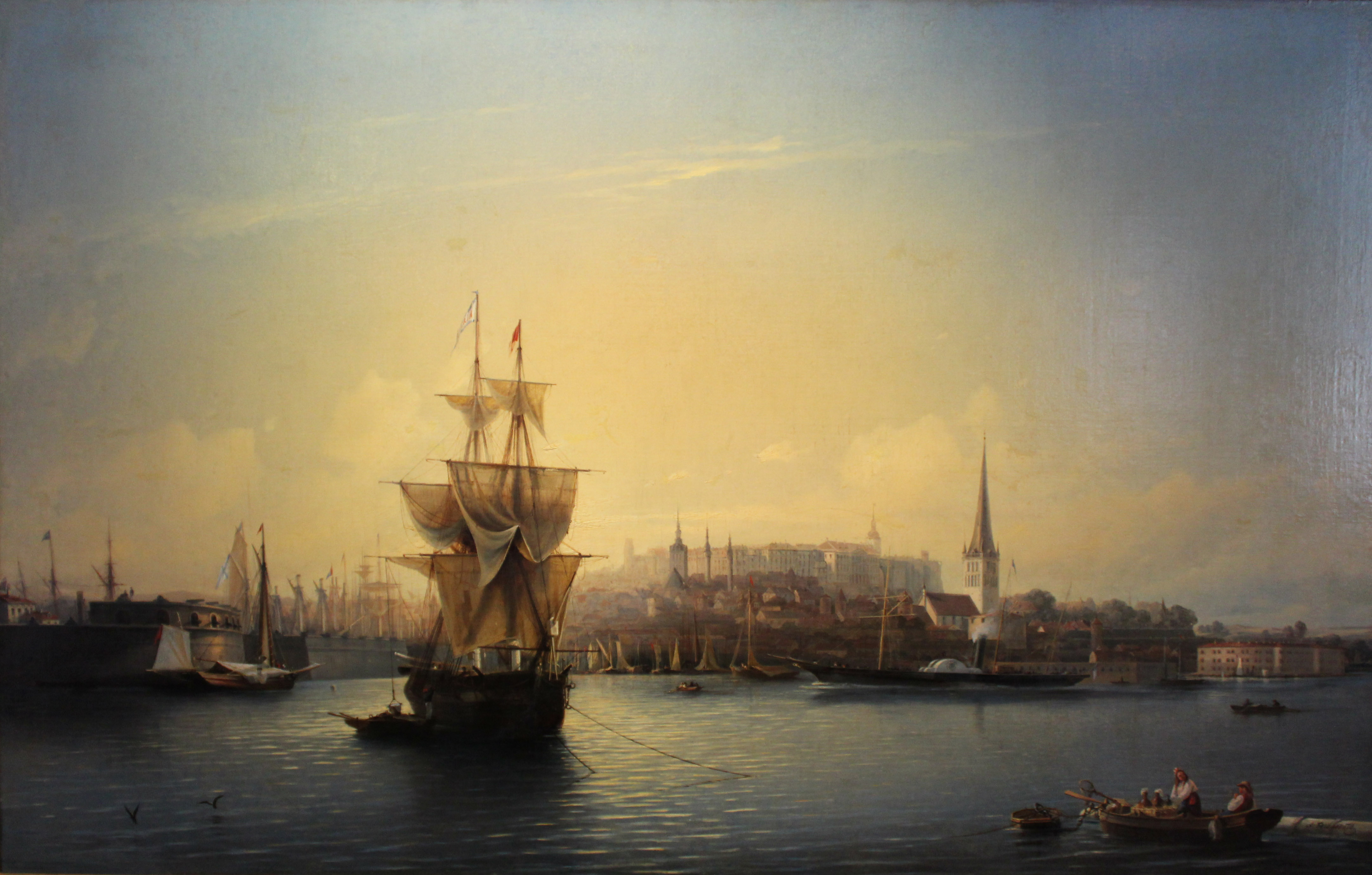
"Port of Tallinn" by Alexey Bogolyubov in 1853

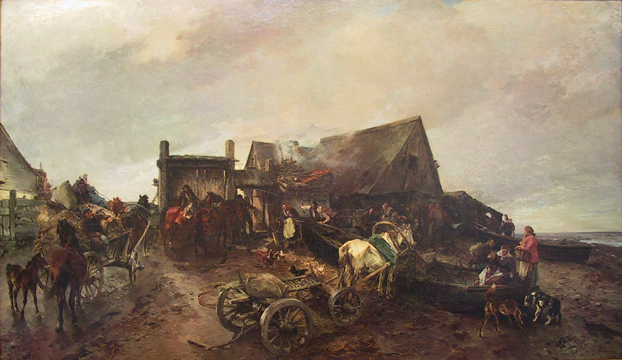
"Old Fish Market Near Tallinn" by Gregor von Bochmann

Imperial Russian rule started with the construction of naval harbours in Tallinn and Paldiski (Swedish: Rogerwiek). Russian Tsar Peter I visited Tallinn at least nine times between 1711 and 1723. He personally opened the construction for Tallinn Naval Harbour in 1714 and Paldiski Naval Harbour in 1718.

In 1870, the Paldiski-Tallinn-St. Petersburg Railway was opened, after which several smaller settlements along the line - Paldiski, Keila, Saue, Nõmme, Aruküla, Raasiku, Kehra and Aegviidu (then in Viru County) - started to grow. Several elements of Peter the Great's Naval Fortress were built in Harju County and its headquarters were in Tallinn.

During World War I in 1914, the native population of Naissaar island was expelled from the island and it was turned into a military base. A narrow-gauge railway network was built on the island. Tallinn was the site for the very beginning of the October Revolution when the Estonian Bolshevik Jaan Anvelt took power in Tallinn on 5 November 1917, two days before the Revolution started in Petrograd. On 9 November 1917, the Bolsheviks took power from Governor Jaan Poska. After the coup, refusing to cooperate with the Estonian Soviet Executive Committee, the Estonian Provincial Assembly (Estonian: Maanõukogu) in Tallinn declared sovereignty from the Russian Empire on 28 November 1917. In December 1917, Russian sailors under the leadership of Stepan Maximovich Petrichenko declared the "Soviet Republic of Soldiers and Fortress-Builders of Naissaar". They were ousted by German forces on 26 February 1918.

=== Republic of Estonia ===
The Republic of Estonia was proclaimed in Tallinn on 24 February 1918 while German occupation followed on the next day. German rule ended with the November Revolution in Germany. During the Estonian War of Independence, Soviet troops were halted only 40 km east of Tallinn by the end of 1918. Tallinn was the site of a failed Communist coup d'état attempt of 1924.

=== Occupation era ===
==== Soviet rule ====
On 18 September 1939, after both Germany and the Soviet Union had invaded Poland, the Polish submarine ORP Orzeł escaped from internment in Tallinn Harbor during the Orzeł incident. The submarine eventually made her way to the United Kingdom, which led both the Soviet Union and Germany to question Estonia's neutrality. On 24 September 1939, Soviet Navy warships appeared in North Estonian waters and Soviet Air Force bombers patrolled above Tallinn and the nearby countryside.

The Soviet Union demanded that Estonia allow the Soviet military bases and stationed 25,000 troops on Estonian soil for the duration of the European war. On 28 September 1939, the government of Estonia accepted the ultimatum and signed the mutual assistance treaty. Paldiski was made a Soviet Naval Base and its population was expelled from the town. With its new military bases in Northern Estonia, the Soviet Union invaded Finland on 30 November 1939, starting the Winter War. During 1939–1940, most of the Baltic German population from Tallinn and the Harju County countryside fled to Germany (Umsiedlung).

On 14 June 1940, the Soviet Navy set up a naval blockade in the Gulf of Finland and the Baltic Sea and stationed a navy squadron west of Naissaar island near Tallinn. Soviet bombers shot down the passenger airplane "Kaleva" near Keri island, killing all nine on board, which had included foreign diplomats.

On 16 June 1940, the Red Army invaded Estonia and organised a Soviet coup d'état in Tallinn. On 21 June 1940, the Independent Signal Battalion in Tallinn showed resistance to the Red Army, until it surrendered and was disarmed on the same day. The Soviet powers organised rigged parliamentary elections and the new parliament declared the Estonian SSR on 21 July 1940, which was annexed by the Soviet Union on 6 August 1940. Most county and municipal leaders were replaced and local assemblies were replaced with Soviets. The native population of Naissaar island was expelled from the island (as in 1914) as the island was turned into a military base. During the 1940–41 Soviet Occupation, thousands were executed, imprisoned, mobilised into the Red Army labour battalions or deported to Siberia on 14 June 1941 (June deportation).

==== Summer War ====
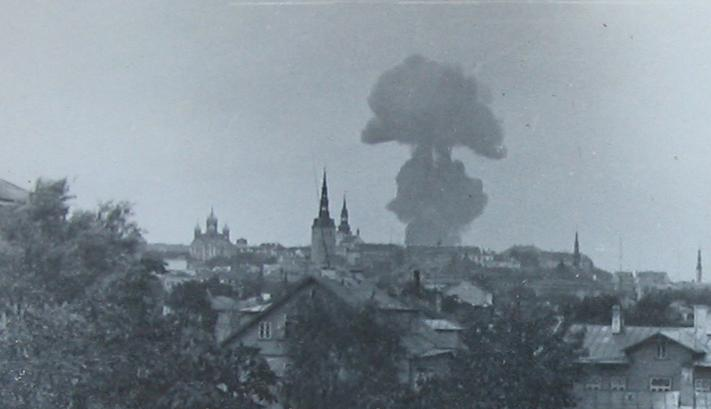
Battles for Tallinn in August 1941

Germany invaded the Soviet Union on 22 June 1941 and Finland declared the Continuation War with the Soviet Union on 25 June 1941. As the Soviet Union retreated, its destruction battalions carried out the scorched-earth tactics. The Erna long-range reconnaissance group was sent from Finland to Northern Estonia on 10 July 1941 to perform reconnaissance of the retreating Red Army, but it eventually engaged the destruction battalions near Kautla forest (Battle of Kautla) on 31 July to 1 August 1941, allowing 2,000 civilians to flee.

German forces started its Tallinn Offensive on 19 August 1941, capturing Rapla on 21 August 1941. They reached Tallinn outskirts in Pirita on 24 August 1941 and Harku and Lasnamäe on 26 August 1941. Ordinary citizens were ordered to build defenses around Tallinn. Soviet forces started evacuating by sea on 24 August 1941. Of the 195 ships, that left Tallinn and Paldiski, 55 were sunk by mines near Juminda Peninsula, killing around 15,000 evacuees. Evacuating Soviet forces destroyed much of the infrastructure and industry around Tallinn. German forces captured Paldiski and Tallinn on 28 August 1941, shooting down the Soviet Flag on Tallinn Pikk Hermann Tower. Estonians replaced it with the Flag of Estonia, but it was replaced with the Flag of Germany the next day. German forces were greeted as liberators in Tallinn. It was also the first time since 1219 that Tallinn had been captured following a military engagement.

==== German occupation ====
Northern Estonia was the site of several concentration camps and massacres. In September 1942, up to three thousand foreign Jews and Gypsies were executed at Kalevi-Liiva in Jõelähtme Parish, while the rest were sent to the small Jägala concentration camp nearby, that never had more than 200 prisoners as their lifespan was short. Klooga concentration camp in Keila Parish was mostly evacuated before the Soviet takeover, however, 2,000 prisoners were executed before the German retreat. The Red Army liberated the few survivors on 22 September 1944.

Tallinn was bombed by the Soviet Air Force on 9 and 10 March 1944, killing 757 people and destroying 8,000 buildings (about one-third of the capital). Among others, Harju Street, St. Nicholas' Church, and Estonia Theatre were hit. 36-38 Soviet bombers were shot down during the bombardment.

After the Red Army broke through the Tannenberg Line in Eastern Estonia and crossed the Emajõgi river near Tartu, it launched the Tallinn Offensive on 17 September 1944 when Adolf Hitler had agreed to start abandoning Estonia on 16 September 1944. The National Committee of the Republic of Estonia was formed in Tallinn in March 1944 and the last Prime Minister of Estonia Jüri Uluots organized a new government under Otto Tief on 18 September 1944, captured government offices in Tallinn on 20 September 1944, and put the Estonian flag on top of the Pikk Hermann Tower.

German forces started Operation Aster to evacuate its 50,000 soldiers and 20,000 civilians through Tallinn and Paldiski. On the way, the hospital ship "Moero" was attacked and sunk by the Soviet Air Force, killing 637 of its passengers. The retreating German forces avoided conflict with the Red Army in Tallinn and the invading army saw only little resistance by Estonian units led by Rear Admiral Johan Pitka. The Red Army entered Tallinn on 22 September and Paldiski on 24 September 1944.

Before the Soviet reoccupation in 1944, thousands fled to Sweden across the Baltic Sea, including the entire Estonian Swedish population, who had been settling also on Pakri islands in Harju County.

==== Second Soviet rule ====
The Forest Brothers resistance movement was considered to be the weakest in Harju County, due to dense population, fewer forests and more Soviet military activity. New deportations followed in 1949. The Soviet era brought development of heavy industry, a massive influx of foreign workers from throughout the Soviet Union and construction of new districts (Maardu, Mustamäe, Väike-Õismäe and Lasnamäe) for Tallinn.

Hotel Viru in Tallinn was built in 1972 as the first modern highrise in Estonia. The 1980 Summer Olympics Sailing events were held in Tallinn. The event also brought major construction, such as the seaside road from Central Tallinn to Pirita, renovation projects in Tallinn Old Town and the iconic highrise Hotel Olümpia and Tallinn TV Tower.

In 1962, Paldiski became a Soviet Navy nuclear submarine training centre and had two land-based nuclear reactors with 16,000 employees. It was a closed town until the last Russian warship left in August 1994. Until then it was the last Russian military base in Estonia. Russia relinquished control of the nuclear reactor facilities in September 1995.

== Administrative history ==
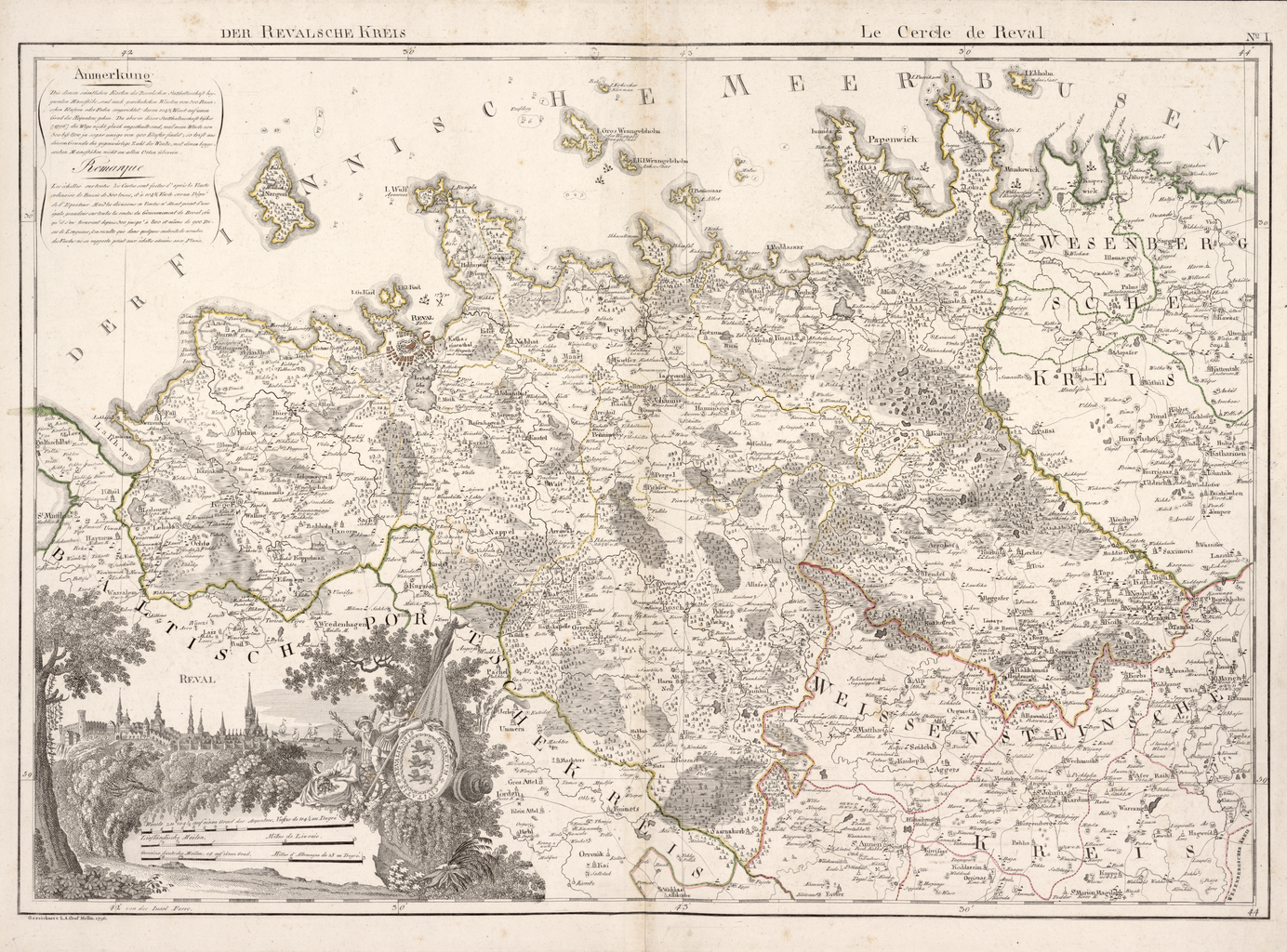
Map of Harju County after the separation of Paldiski County in 1783–1796

=== Formation of the county ===
The ancient counties of Harjumaa and Revala were merged into Harju County in 1266. It remained within most of its borders until 1949 (with the exclusion of 1783–1796, when Paldiski County was separated).

During the Soviet occupation, in 1940, Tallinn became a city of republic significance. Loksa was transferred to Viru County in 1949. The rest of Harju County was replaced with four raions during the Soviet occupation in 1950. Harju Raion around Tallinn gradually absorbed the former areas of Harju County as Loksa Raion was abolished in 1957, Kose Raion in 1959 and Keila Raion in 1962 and most of their territories transferred to Harju Raion. Aegviidu, Aegviidu Village Council and Kohila Village Council were transferred to Harju Raion in 1962. Harju Raion and the remaining Rapla Raion became Harju County and Rapla County in 1990. Tallinn was reincorporated into Harju County in 1993.

=== Municipal history ===
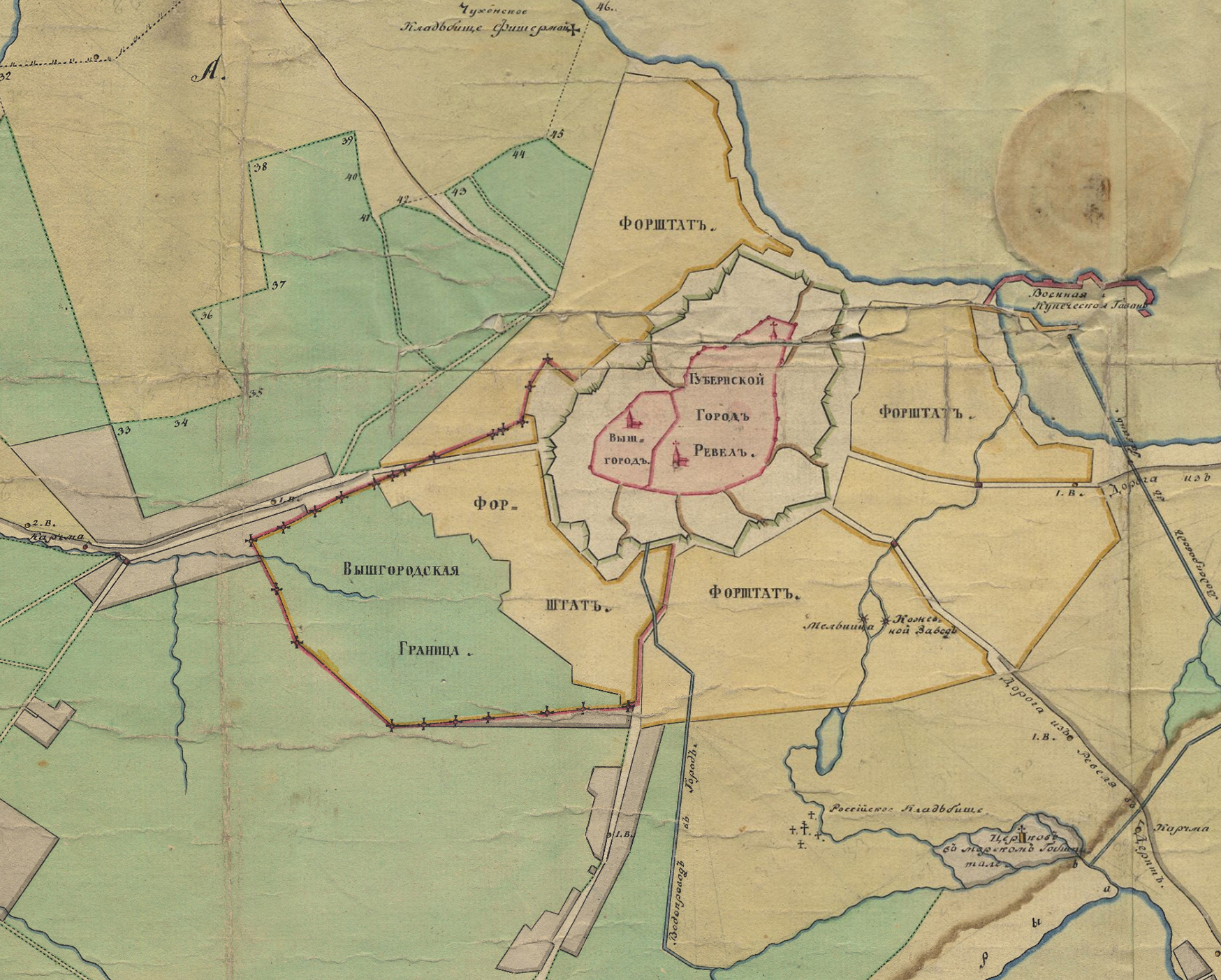
Map of Tallinn with its two municipalities (Toompea and Lower Town) in 1810

==== Urban municipalities ====
Tallinn was the first settlement in Harju County to receive town rights in 1248. Municipally, it consisted of the "upper town" of Toompea and the "lower town". The two municipalities were merged in 1877. The naval harbour town of Paldiski received its town rights in 1783. Nõmme was given a town status in 1926 and Keila in 1938.

Soviet powers merged Nõmme with Tallinn already in 1940. They also separated Tallinn from Harju County and it became a centrally administered town. The same was applied to Paldiski in 1941. The German occupation of 1941-1944 left only Tallinn separated from Harju County. The Soviet reoccupation brought Paldiski back to central administration. Tallinn was divided into four urban raions in 1945 and it gained several new territories from its surrounding parishes. Aegviidu (then in Järva County), Järvakandi and Kohila (both now in Rapla County) and Kehra were named boroughs. The central administration of Paldiski was abolished in 1950 when Paldiski was merged with Keila Raion. Tallinn absorbed Saue in 1960 and Maardu in 1962 and the latter became a town within the municipality of Tallinn in 1980.

Maardu and Saue were separated from Tallinn in 1991 and Kehra, Loksa and Saue were given town status in 1993. The central administration of Tallinn was abolished and the town was re-transferred into Harju County. Its urban raions were abolished in 1993 and replaced with eight modern districts.

==== Rural municipalities ====
Ancient Estonian counties were divided into parishes (Estonian language: kihelkond), that became centered on local churches from the 13th century. Modern municipal parishes (Estonian: vald) were created in the 19th century. They were created within the old parishes, that were still centered on the local church.

Soviet rule brought major changes in rural municipalities as local village councils were created throughout 1945. The parishes were abolished with the creation of raions in 1950. Naissaar Parish had been abolished and given to the Red Army already in 1940 and Pakri Parish had been abolished and merged with Paldiski in 1947.

Village councils were renamed "parishes" in 1990–1993. Kehra merged into Anija Parish in 2002, Loksa Parish merged into Kuusalu Parish in 2005 and Kõue Parish merged into Kose Parish in 2013.

== Demography ==
=== Population ===
On 31 December 2021, there were 614,567 people living permanently in Harju county, which was 11.2% more than at the same time ten years ago. Ethnic Estonians made up 60.57% (372,245) of the population, Russians 28.99% (178,169), Ukrainians 3.07% (18,886), Belarusians 1.22% (7,473), Finns 0.69% (4,226), Latvians 0.29% (1,812) and others 5.17% (31,756).

=== Religion ===
The following congregations of the Estonian Evangelical Lutheran Church (EELC) operate in Harju County: Tallinn Deanery: Tallinn Episcopal Cathedral Congregation, Tallinn Harkujärve, Tallinn Lasnamäe, Tallinn Mustamäe, Tallinn Nõmme, Tallinn Rahu, Tallinn Jaani, Tallinn Bethel, Tallinn Holy Spirit congregation, Tallinn German Redeemer congregation, Tallinn Swedish Michael congregation, Tallinn Finnish Saint Peter congregation and Tallinn Toompea Kaarli congregation, as well as Viimsi Congregation. The EELC's East-Harju Deanery includes the congregations of Harju-Jaani, Jõelähtme, Jüri, Kose, Kuusalu, Leesi, Loksa, Prangli, Randvere, Rannamõisa and Tuhala. The EELC's West-Harju Deanery includes the congregations of Harju-Madise, Keila, Niss, Paldiski Nikolai, Harju-Risti, Rannamõisa, Saku and Saue from the congregations located in Harju County.

The following congregations operate under the administration of the Tallinn Diocese of the Estonian Apostolic Orthodox Church: Aruküla Holy Trinity congregation, Paldiski St. George's congregation, Tallinn St. George's congregation, Tallinn St. Simeon and the Prophetess Hannah congregation, Tallinn Transfiguration Main Church congregation. The following Orthodox congregations operate under the jurisdiction of the Estonian Orthodox Church of the Moscow Patriarchate: Loksa Kronstad St. Righteous John the Baptist congregation, Maardu Archangel Michael congregation, Paldiski St. Great Martyr Panteleimon congregation, Paldiski St. Sergius of Radonezh congregation, Tallinn congregation of the Quick-Hearing Icon of the Mother of God, Tallinn Our Lady of Kazan congregation, Tallinn Nicholas congregation, Tallinn Nõmme congregation of John the Baptist, Tallinn Holy Bishop Nicholas congregation, Tallinn Alexander Nevski congregation.

There is also one Old Believer congregation.

The congregations belonging to the Catholic Church in Estonia that operate in Harju County are: the Tallinn St. Apostles Peter and Paul congregation, Tallinn Ukrainian Catholic congregation, and Catholic masses are held in the chapel of the Birgittine Monastery, the chapel of the Sisters of Mother Teresa, and the St. Athanasius Chapel in the Dominican Monastery.

Baptist congregations operating in Harju County: Tallinn St. Olaf's, Kehra, Keila, Loksa, Valkla, Laagri, Tallinn Allika, Tallinn Living Stone Free Congregation, Tallinn Kalju, Tallinn Christian Mosaic, Tallinn Mähe, Tallinn Mustamäe, Viimasi, Nõmme and Tallinn Bible Church.

There are also congregations of Moravian Church (or Unitas Fratrum) in Harju County: Tallinn Endla, Harku, Kuusalu, Nabala, Nissi and Saku-Tõdva.

Of the other Christian churches, there are 6 Methodist churches, 7 Pentecostal churches, 8 Jehovah's Witnesses congregations, 6 Adventist churches. Of the other religions, there is 1 Estonian Neopagan congregation and one Muslim congregation, one synagogue and one Buddhist association.

Religious affiliations in Harju County, census 2000–2021*
Religion	2000		2011		2021	
Religion	Number	%	Number	%	Number	%
Christianity	134,164	30.5	143,555	31.2	149,990	29.5
—Orthodox Christians	71,674	16.3	91,829	20.0	101,410	20.0
—Lutherans	53,043	12.1	41,771	9.1	33,920	6.7
—Catholics	3,071	0.7	2,612	0.6	5,180	1.0
—Baptists	2,175	0.5	1,777	0.4	2,100	0.4
—Jehovah's Witnesses	1,766	0.4	1,778	0.3	1,730	0.3
—Pentecostals	989	0.2	757	0.1	1,030	0.2
—Old Believers	282	0.06	507	0.08	380	0.1
—Methodists	643	0.15	545	0.1	620	0.1
—Adventists	525	0.1	-	-	380	0.1
—Other Christians	-	-	1,980	0.4	3,240	0.6
Islam	929	0.2	1,034	0.2	4,620	0.9
Buddhism	-	-	-	-	1,170	0.2
Other religions**	3,544	0.8	1,572	0.3	6,640	1.3
No religion	172,813	39.4	226,975	49.4	275,480	54.2
Not stated***	127,491	20.0	88,026	19.1	69,230	13.6
Total population*	438,945		459,589		508,150	
*The censuses of Estonia count the religious affiliations of the population older than 15 years of age.

== Geography ==
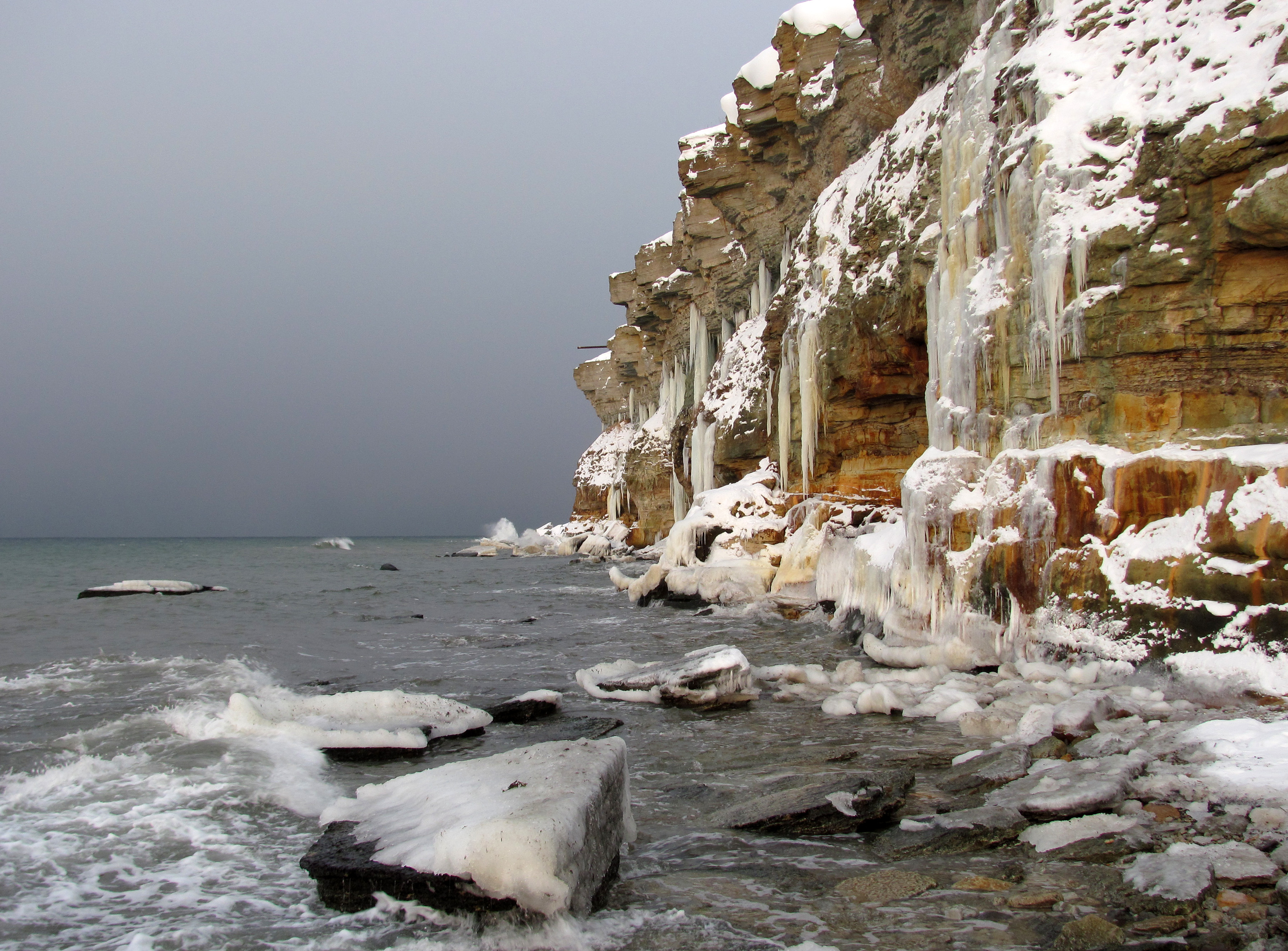
North-Estonian Klint at Pakri Peninsula in Paldiski (24 m)

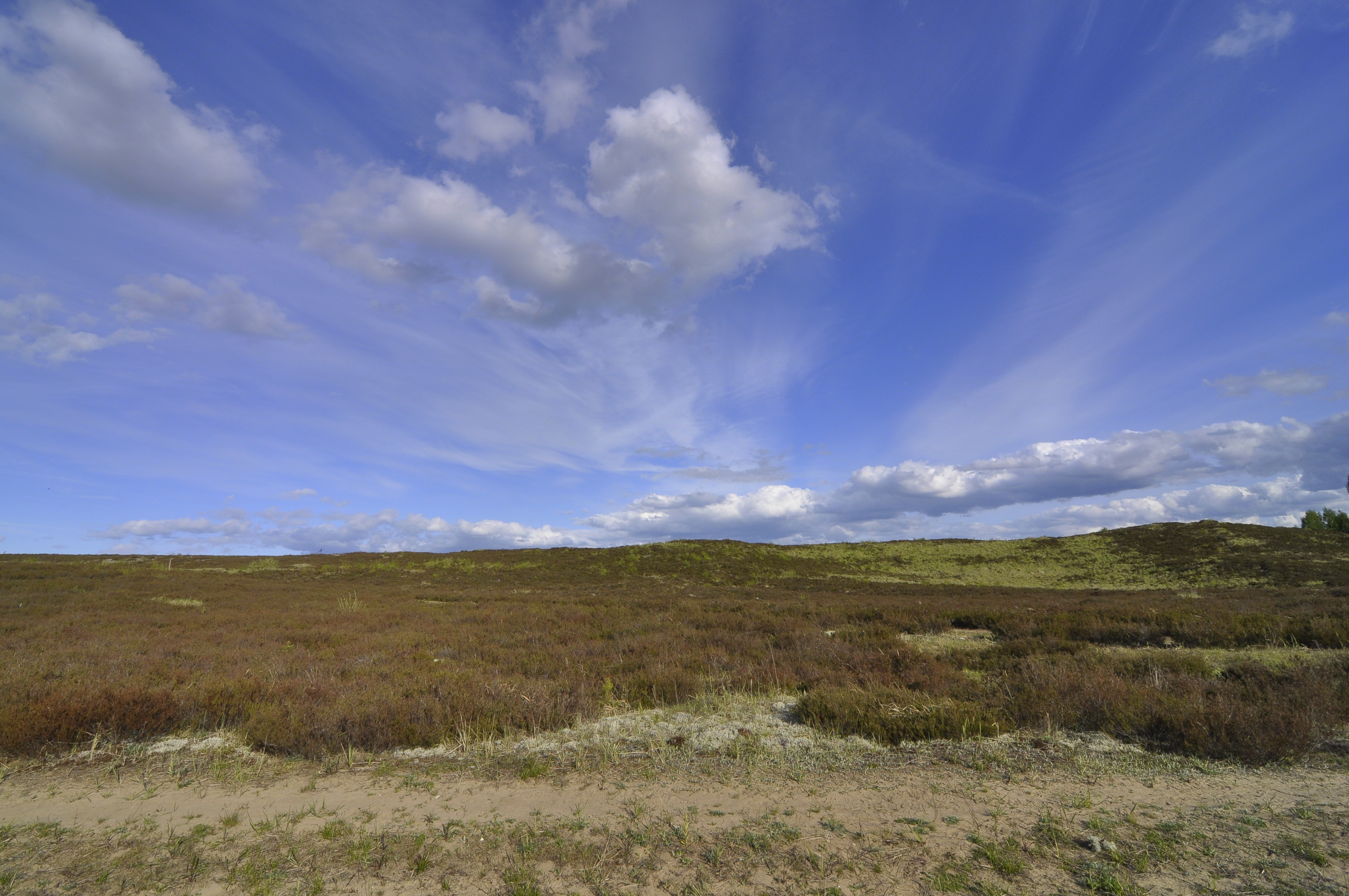
Jussi heath in Anija Parish

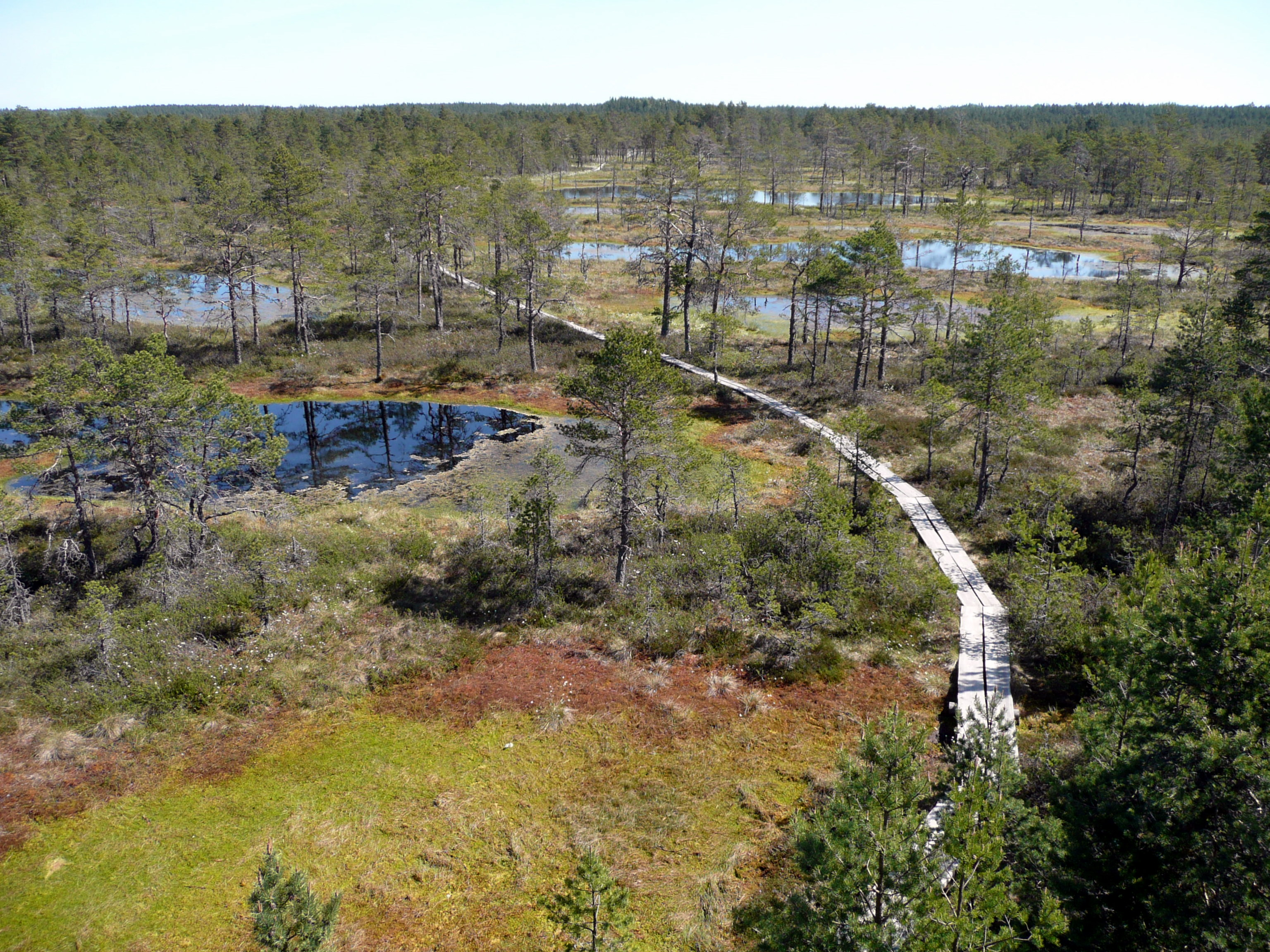
Viru Bog, Kuusalu Parish, in Lahemaa National Park

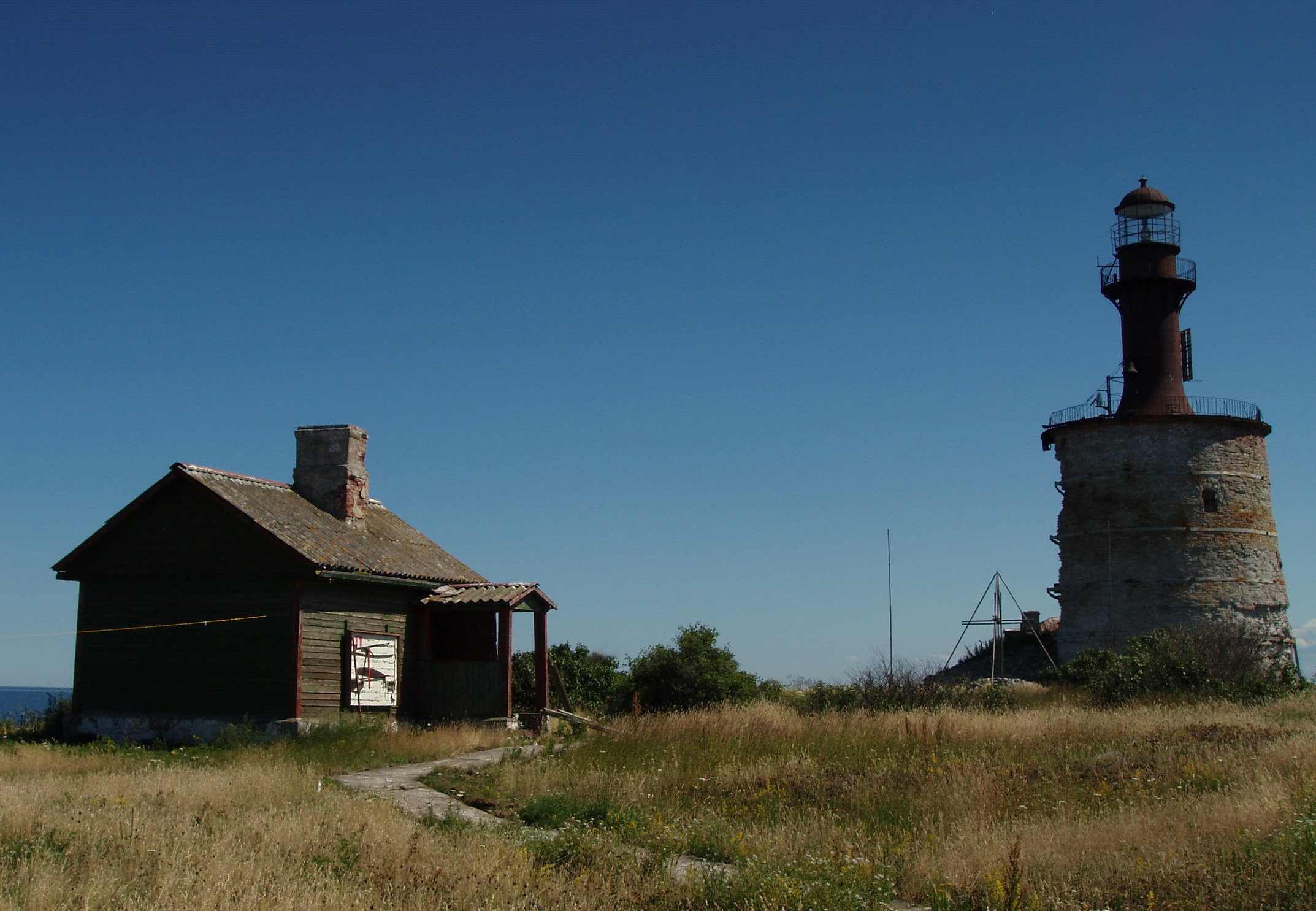
Keri island, northernmost point of Harju County, and its lighthouse, was the first lighthouse to be powered by natural gas in the world in 1907.

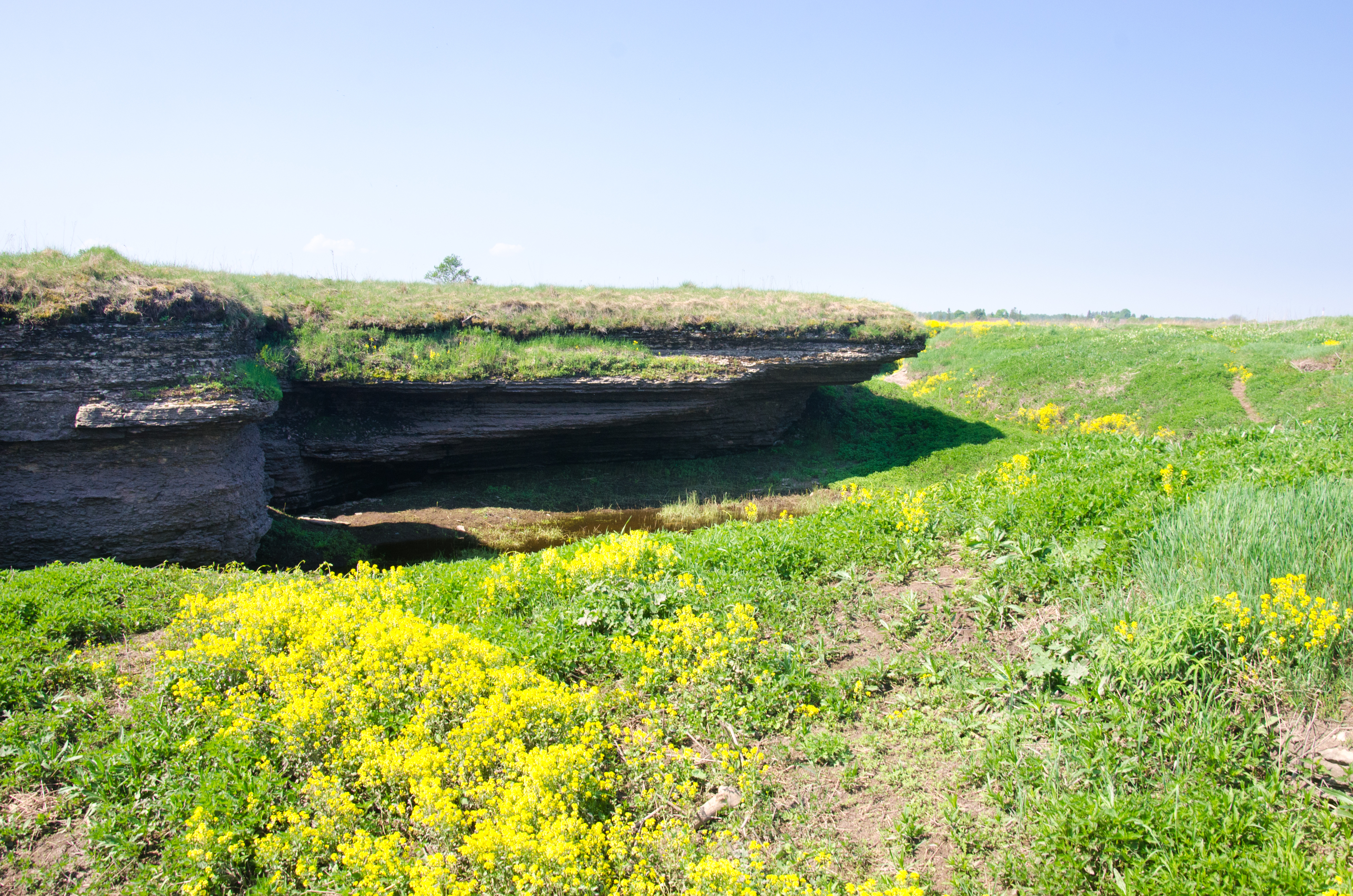
Kostivere Karst area

Harju County lies on the southern coast of the Gulf of Finland. Its shores are dominated by the North-Estonian coastal plain and the North-Estonian Klint separates the plain from Harju plateau in central and southern Harju County. The forested Kõrvemaa area is located in eastern Harju County and the West Estonian plain in western Harju County.

=== Shoreline ===
The shoreline is mostly low, but is at some places close to the high North-Estonian Klint. The coastal cliff is the highest in Rannamõisa (35 m (115 ft)) and Türisalu (30 m (98 ft)) in Harku Parish, and in three points in Paldiski: Pakri Peninsula (24 m (79 ft)), Leetse (20 m (66 ft)) and Väike-Pakri island (13 m (43 ft)). There are also several long sand beaches, for example Kakumäe, Stroomi in Pelguranna, Pikakari in Paljassaare and Pirita along the shoreline and Lake Harku in Pikaliiva, all within Tallinn, and Kloogaranna and Kaberneeme in the countryside. The shoreline is also characterized by many peninsulas, such as Pakri, Lohusalu, Suurupi, Kakumäe, Kopli, Paljassaare, Viimsi, Ihasalu, Kaberneeme, Juminda and Pärispea.

=== Islands ===
The shoreline is dotted with several islands, with the largest ones being Naissaar (18.6 km^{2} (7.2 sq mi)), Väike-Pakri (12.9 km^{2} (5.0 sq mi)), Suur-Pakri (11.6 km^{2} (4.5 sq mi)), Prangli (6.4 km^{2} (2.5 sq mi)), Aegna (2.9 km^{2} (1.1 sq mi)) and Rammu (1.0 km^{2} (0.39 sq mi)). All of the larger islands and several of the smaller islands have had a considerable historical population. Pakri Islands, Naissaar and Prangli even formed separate municipalities. Their population diminished during Soviet occupation, either gradually or by force. Today, Prangli (73 inhabitants) and Naissaar (three inhabitants) both consist of three villages within Viimsi Parish. Aegna (eight inhabitants) is a subdistrict in Kesklinn (central) district of Tallinn. Pakri islands (six inhabitants) are part of Paldiski. Koipsi and Rammu form uninhabited villages within Jõelähtme Parish.

=== Lakes and rivers ===
The largest lakes in Harju County are Lake Ülemiste (9.6 km^{2} (3.7 sq mi)) and Lake Harku (1.6 km^{2} (0.62 sq mi)) in Tallinn and Lake Kahala (3.5 km^{2} (1.4 sq mi)) in Kuusalu Parish. The largest artificial lake is Paunküla Reservoir (4.1 km^{2} (1.6 sq mi)) in Kose Parish. The longest rivers are the Keila River (107 km (66 mi) in total), Pirita River (105 km (65 mi)), Jägala River (97 km (60 mi)) and Valgejõgi River (85 km (53 mi)). The two largest permanently active waterfalls in Estonia, Jägala Waterfall (8 m (26 ft)) and Keila Falls (6 m (20 ft)), are on these rivers.

=== Geographical extremes ===
- Northernmost point: Keri island, Kelnase village, Viimsi Parish
  - Mainland: Cape Purekkari, Pärispea village, Kuusalu Parish (Northernmost point of mainland Estonia)
- Easternmost point: Kolgu village, Kuusalu Parish
- Southernmost point: Aela village, Kose Parish
- Westernmost point: Keibu village, Lääne-Harju Parish
- Highest point: 102 m (335 ft) - Määrasmägi, Vetla village, Anija Parish
- Lowest point: 0 m (sea level) - Baltic Sea

=== Protected areas ===
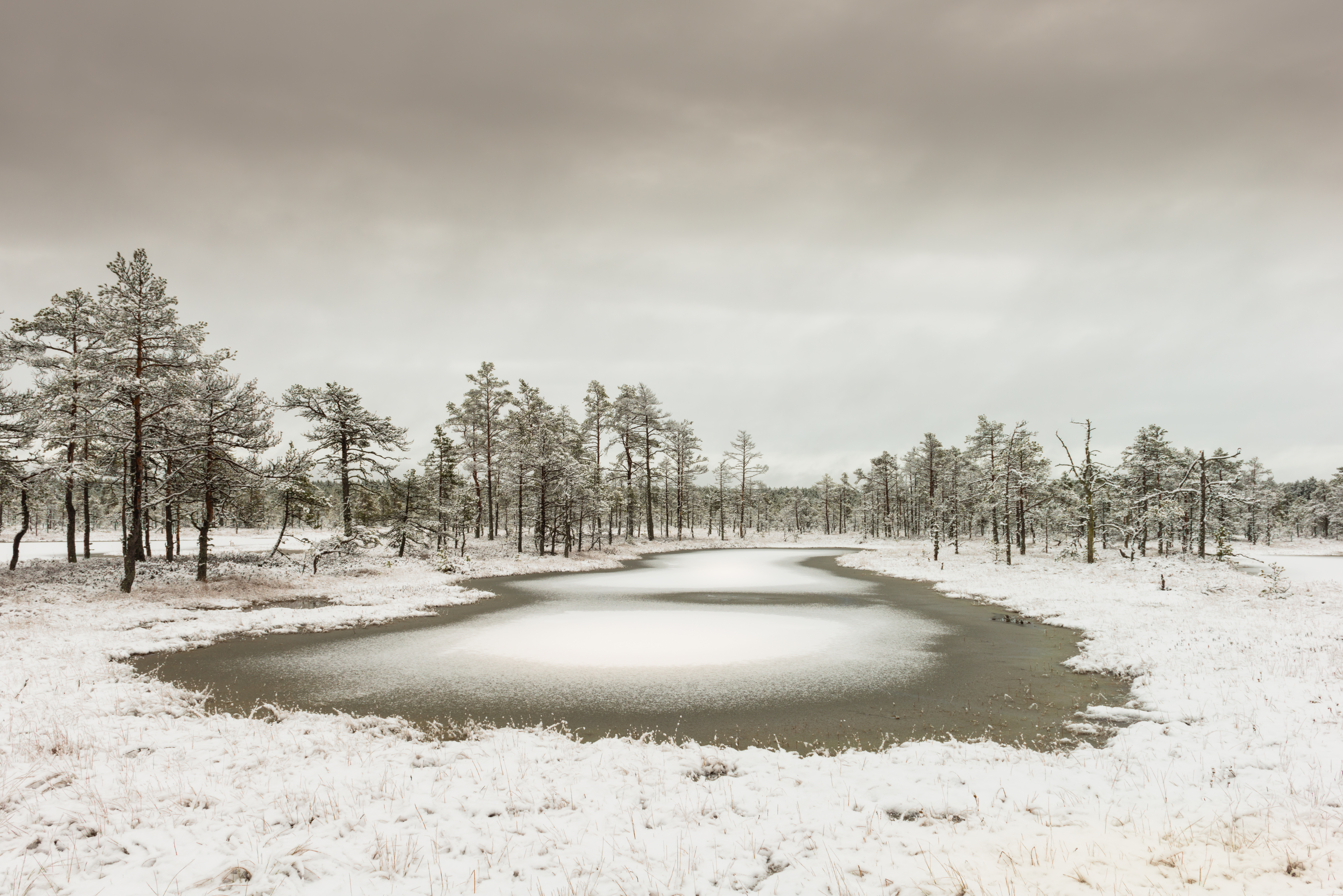
Viru Bog, Lahemaa National Park, in winter

There are a number of protected areas in Harju County. Lahemaa National Park was the first national park in the Soviet Union, when it was created in 1971. The park was intended for the protection of the natural and cultural heritage of the coastal landscapes of Northern Estonia. There are 21 nature reserves and 25 landscape protection areas at least partly in Harju County. The largest is the Põhja-Kõrvemaa Nature Reserve in Kuusalu Parish and Anija Parish.

== Transportation ==
=== Highways ===
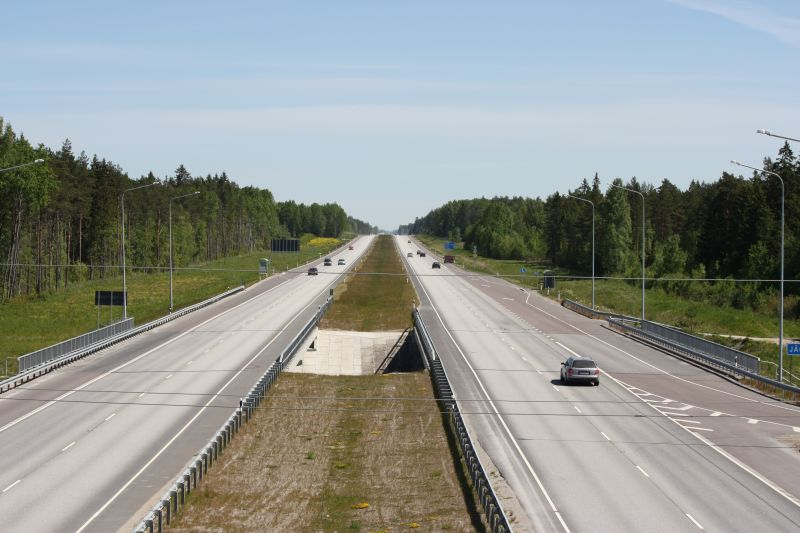
E20 near Jägala, Jõelähtme Parish.

The Harju County highway system is determined by roads leading out from Tallinn.

- T1 / E20 runs from Tallinn to Lääne-Viru County towards Narva. Expressway for 80 km out of Tallinn.
- T2 / E263 runs from Tallinn to Järva County towards Tartu. Expressway for 26 km out of Tallinn.
- T4 / E67 runs from Tallinn to Rapla County towards Pärnu. Expressway for 14 km out of Tallinn.
- T8 / E265 runs from Tallinn to Paldiski via Keila.
- T9runs from Ääsmäe, Saue Parish to Lääne County towards Haapsalu.
- T11 / E265 runs from Lasnamäe to Keila and forms the Tallinn ring road.

=== Rail ===
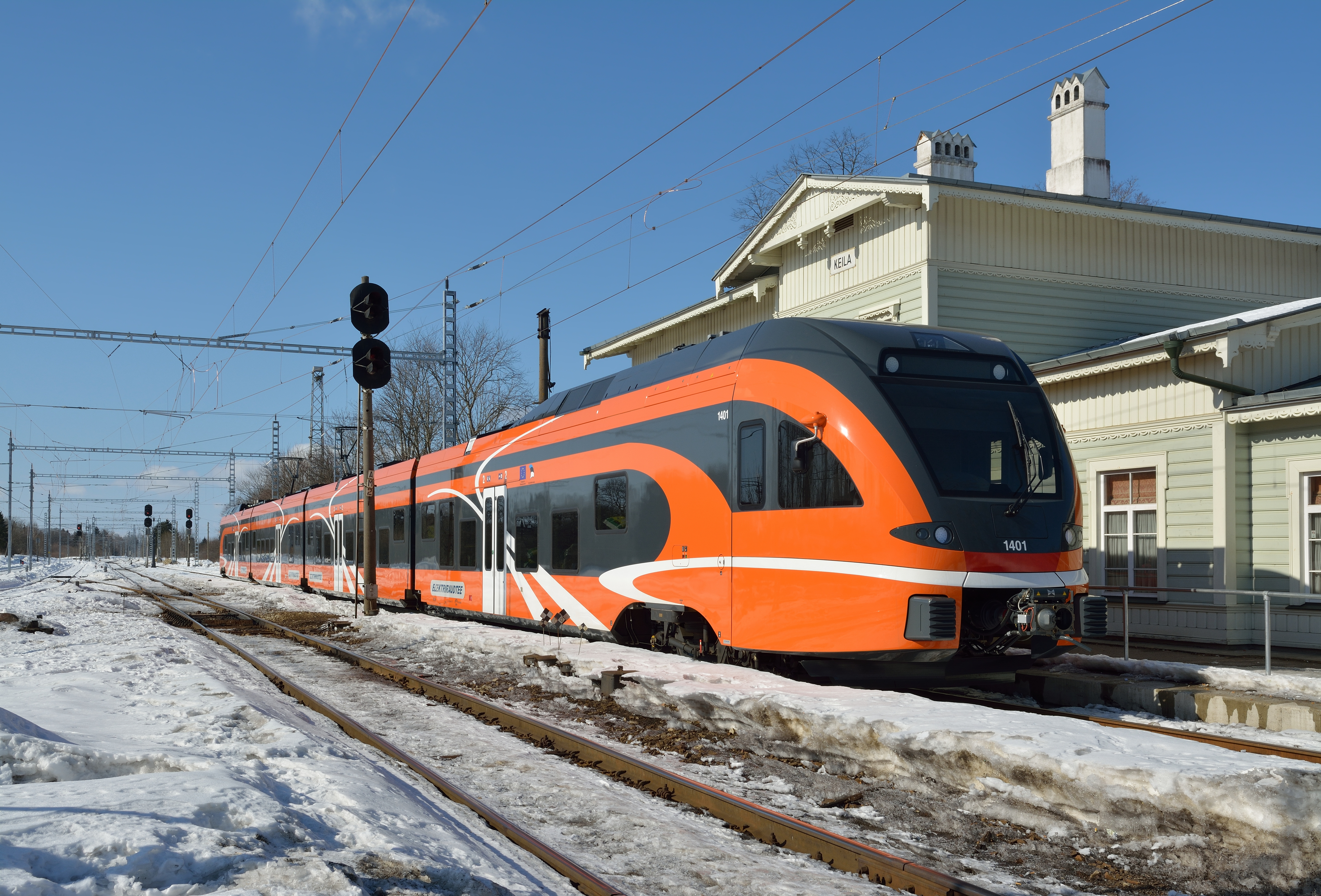
Stadler Flirt in Keila station.

Paldiski-Tallinn-St Petersburg line was opened as the first line in Estonia in 1870. Today, Elron operates both commuter rail in Harju County and inter-city rail from Tallinn. Important lines include Tallinn-Narva/Tartu through Kehra and Aegviidu, Tallinn-Pärnu/Viljandi through Saku and Tallinn-Paldiski through Saue and Keila. Tallinn-Riisipere line used to be extended to Haapsalu. The Rail Baltic Tallinn-Riga-Warsaw line is estimated to become operational in 2024.

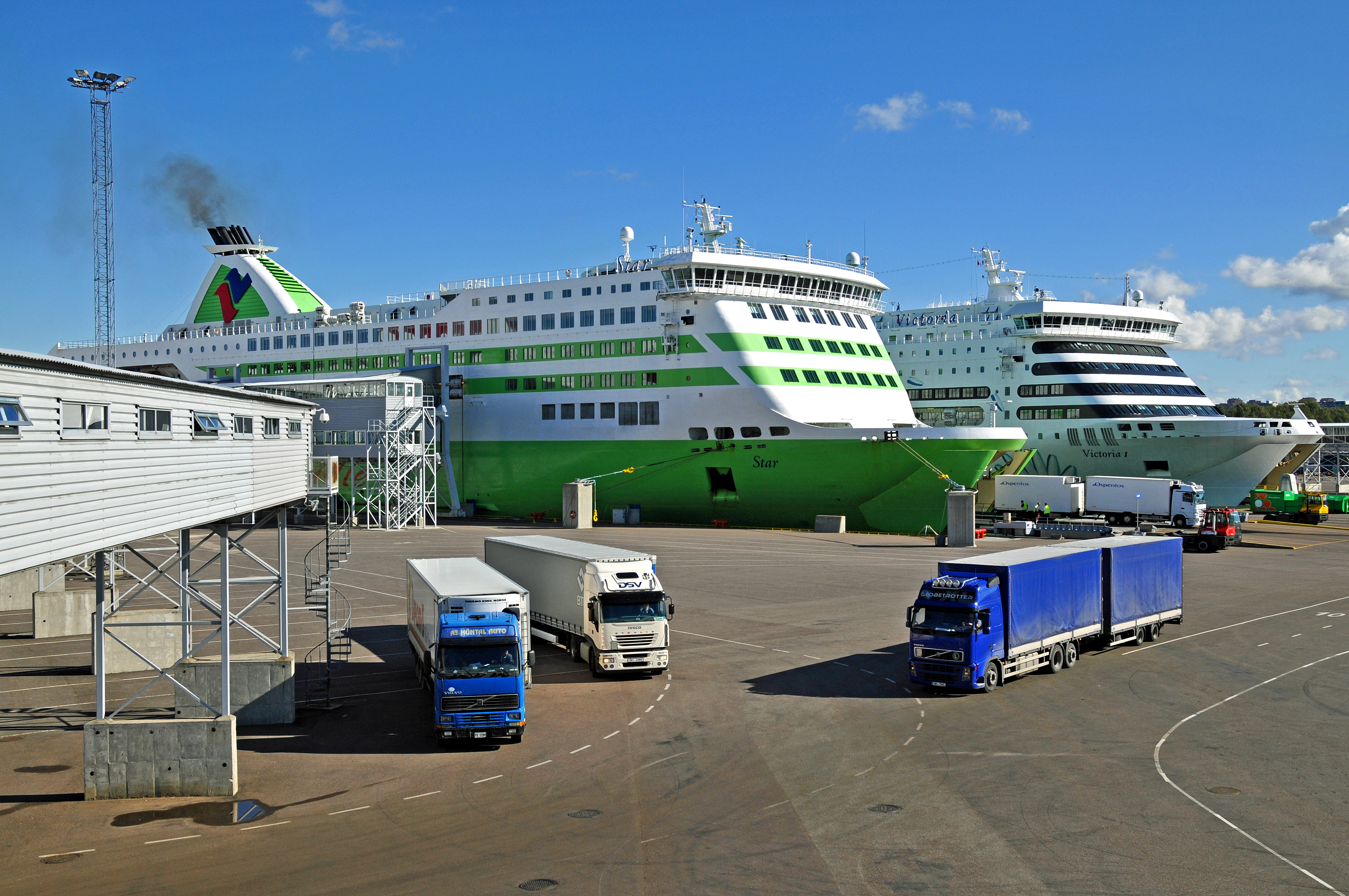
Tallinn Passenger Port

=== Air ===
Harju County and Estonia are serviced by Lennart Meri Tallinn Airport, which is open to both domestic and international flights. The Tallinn Linnahall Heliport offers international flights to Helsinki, Finland.

=== Ports and harbours ===
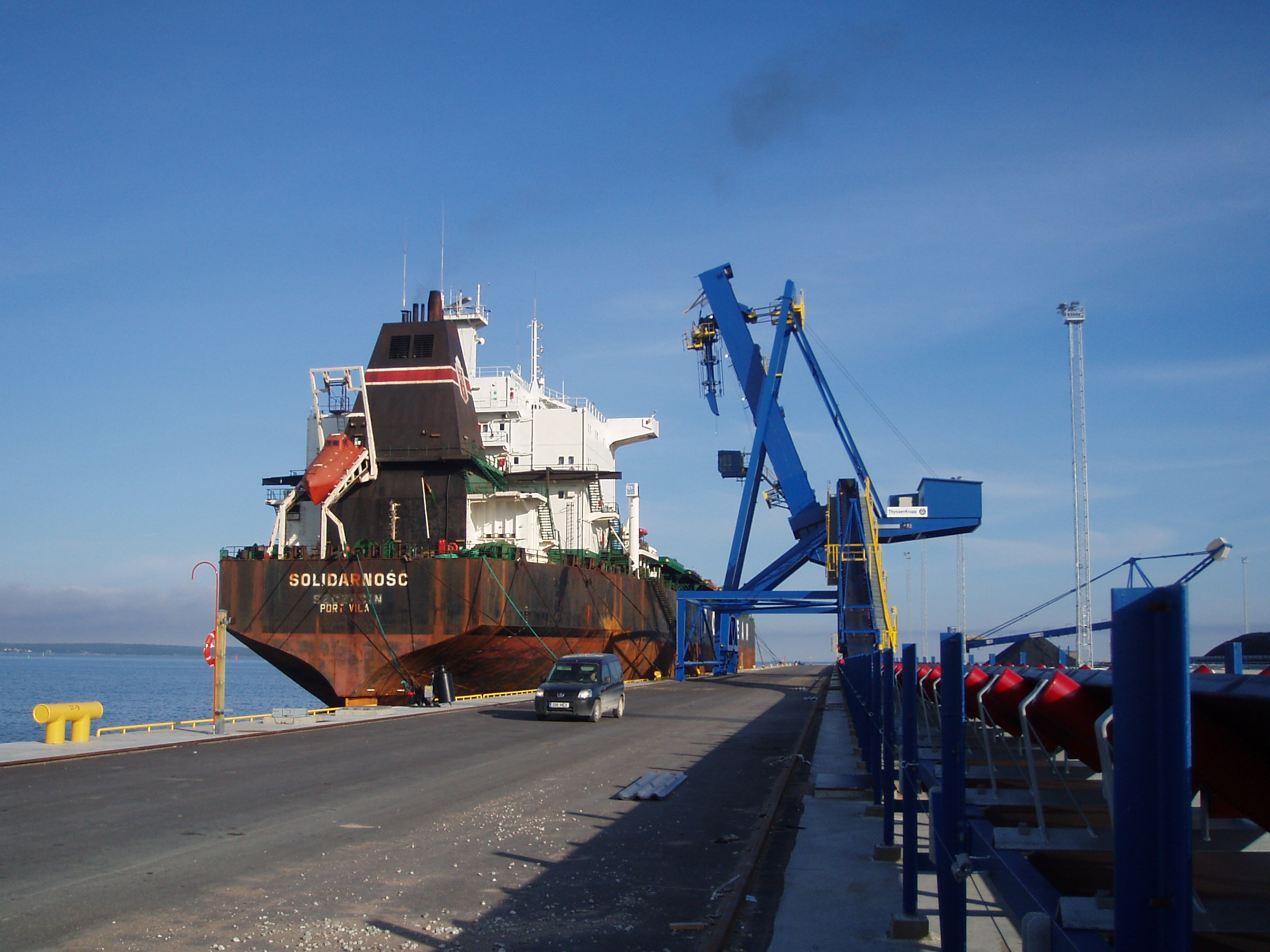
First ship at the Muuga Harbour's Coal Terminal in Maardu

Tallinn Passenger Port or the Old City Harbour served 8.84 million passengers in 2012 on lines to Helsinki, Stockholm and St. Petersburg. Transport to Kelnase Harbour on Prangli Island is provided from Leppneeme Harbour in Viimsi Parish and to Naissaar Island from Tallinn Lennusadam Harbour. Seasonal transport to Aegna Island is provided from Tallinn Kalasadam Harbour.

The biggest cargo port is Muuga Harbour in Maardu and Viimsi Parish. Other large ports include Paldiski North Harbour and Paldiski South Harbour, Miiduranna Harbour in Viimsi Parish and Bekkeri-Meeruse Port, Hundipea Harbour, Lennusadama Harbour, Paljassaare Harbour, Patarei Harbour, Peetri Harbour and Vene-Balti Port in Tallinn.

== Media ==
The official newspaper of Harju County is Harju Elu.

== County government ==
Until 2017 the County Government (Estonian: maavalitsus) was led by a governor (Estonian: maavanem), who was appointed by the Government of Estonia for a term of five years. Since 2009 the governor position was held by Ülle Rajasalu.

Harju County received municipal functions on 30 March 1917. Members of the Harju County Council were elected by the delegates of county municipalities and the first meeting was held on 1 July 1917 in Tallinn's Toompea Castle. Johannes Reinthal won the election for the Chair of the Council. The language of the proceedings was decided to be Estonian.

Harju County Government became the Executive Committee of Harju County Soviet in January 1941. The County Government was restored during the German occupation from autumn 1941 until autumn 1944. In 1950, the Executive Committee of Harju County Soviet became the Executive Committee of Harju District Labour Soviet. The Harju County Government was re-formed in 1990. The Chairs of Harju County Councils, the Heads of County Governments and the County Governors:

- 1917–1920 Johannes Reinthal
- 1920–1922 Oskar Suursööt
- 1922–1927 Martin Kruusimaa (Krusemann)
- 1927–1936 Rudolf Kuris
- 1936–1940 Karl Robert Ruus
- 1940–1941 Gustav Abel
- 1940; 1941–1944 Paul Männik
- 1990–1991 Anti Oidsalu
- 1991–1994 Mati Zernand
- 1994–1999 Mait Kornet
- 1999–2004 Orm Valtson
- 2005–2006 Jaan Mark
- 2006–2009 Värner Lootsmann
- 2009–2017 Ülle Rajasalu

== Settlements ==
Harju County has seven settlements with town status: Tallinn, Maardu, Keila, Saue, Paldiski, Kehra and Loksa. All but Kehra are municipal towns, the latter being part of the parish of Anija Parish since 2002. There are also two boroughs: Kiili and Aegviidu, of which Aegviidu (Aegviidu Parish) is one of the five municipal boroughs of Estonia. There are also 31 small boroughs in Harju County. There are plans to give a town status to Haabneeme in Viimsi Parish and Peetri in Rae Parish.

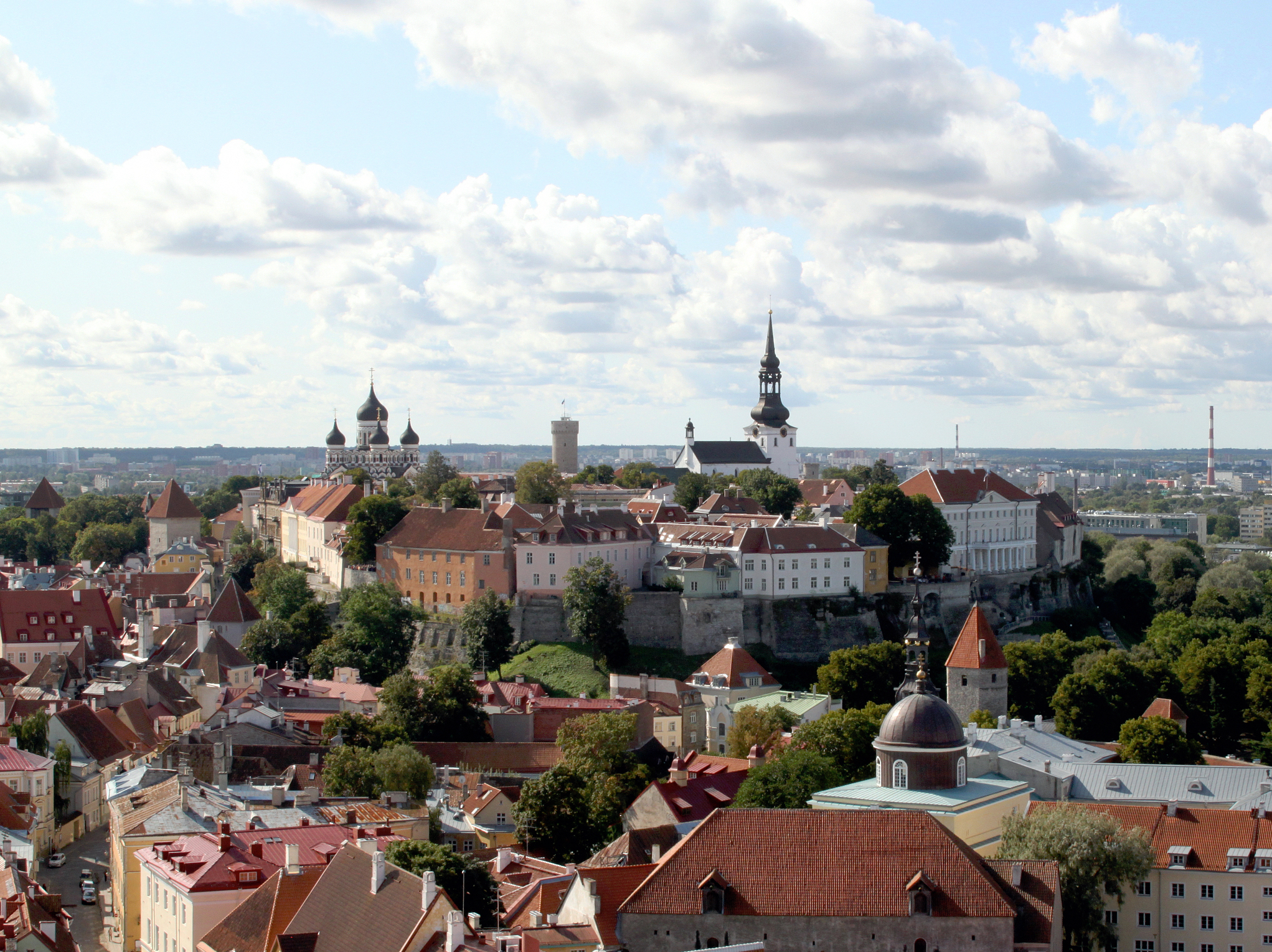
Tallinn

Rank	Settlement	Municipality	Population (2022)
1	Tallinn	Tallinn	437,817
2	Maardu	Maardu	16,170
3	Keila	Keila	10,499
4	Haabneeme	Viimsi Parish	7,265
5	Peetri	Rae Parish	6,352
6	Laagri	Saue Parish	6,117
7	Saue	Saue	5,826
8	Saku	Saku Parish	4,706
9	Paldiski	Paldiski	3,719
10	Jüri	Rae Parish	3,718

== Municipalities ==
Harju County is subdivided into 16 municipalities, of which 4 are urban (Estonian: linnad — cities or towns) and 12 are rural (Estonian: vallad — parishes).

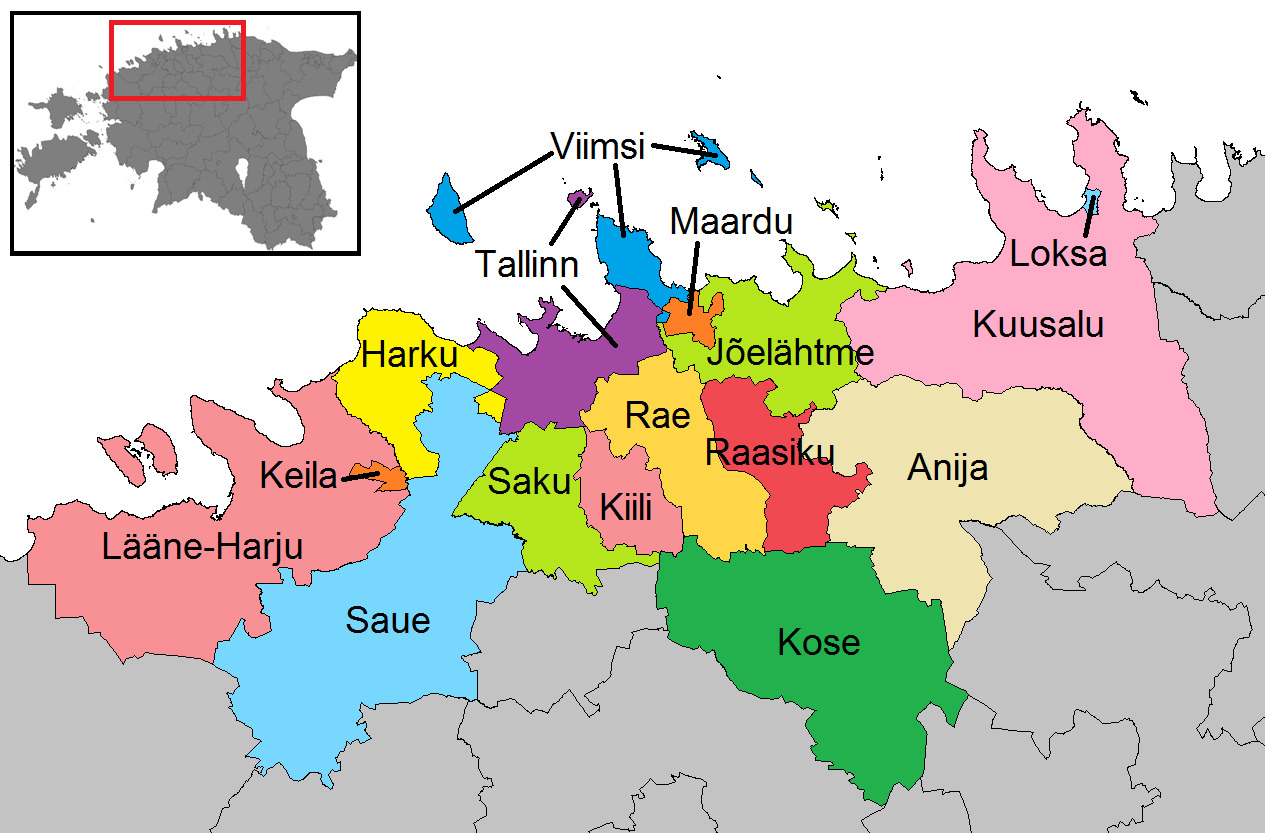
Municipalities in Harju County

Rank	Municipality	Type	Population (2018)	Area km^{2}	Density
1	Anija Parish	Rural	6,280	533	11.8
2	Harku Parish	Rural	14,356	159	90.3
3	Jõelähtme Parish	Rural	6,424	211	30.4
4	Keila City	Urban	9,956	11	905.1
5	Kiili Parish	Rural	5,302	100	53.0
6	Kose Parish	Rural	7,196	533	13.5
7	Kuusalu Parish	Rural	6,547	708	9.2
8	Loksa	Urban	2,663	4	665.8
9	Lääne-Harju Parish	Rural	12,881	644	20.0
10	Maardu	Urban	15,722	23	683.6
11	Raasiku Parish	Rural	5,050	159	31.8
12	Rae Parish	Rural	17,968	207	86.8
13	Saku Parish	Rural	9,864	171	57.7
14	Saue Parish	Rural	21,711	615	35.3
15	Tallinn	Urban	448,758	158	2,840.2
16	Viimsi Parish	Rural	19,784	73	271.0

== Gallery ==
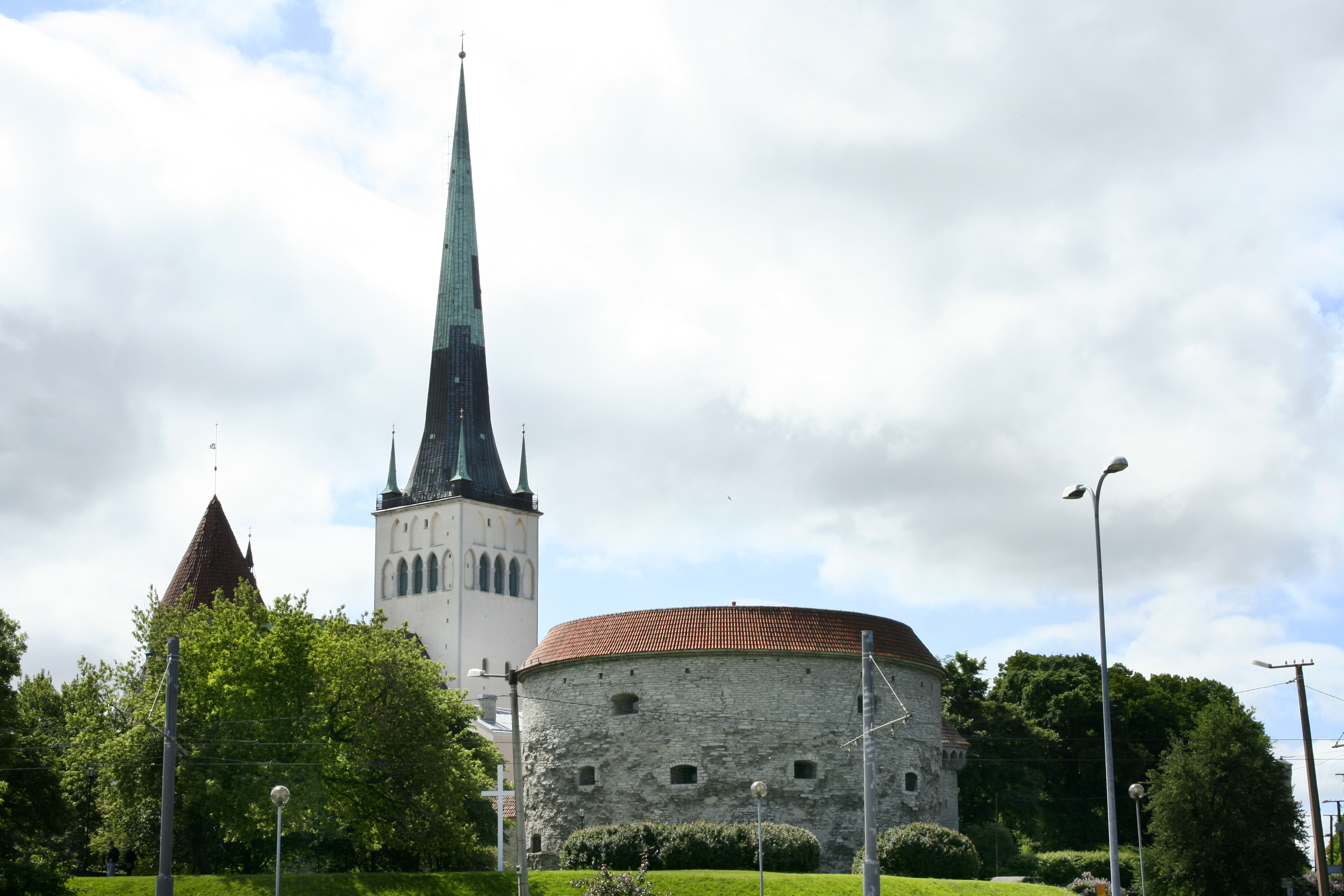
Tallinn St. Olaf's Church and Fat Margaret tower

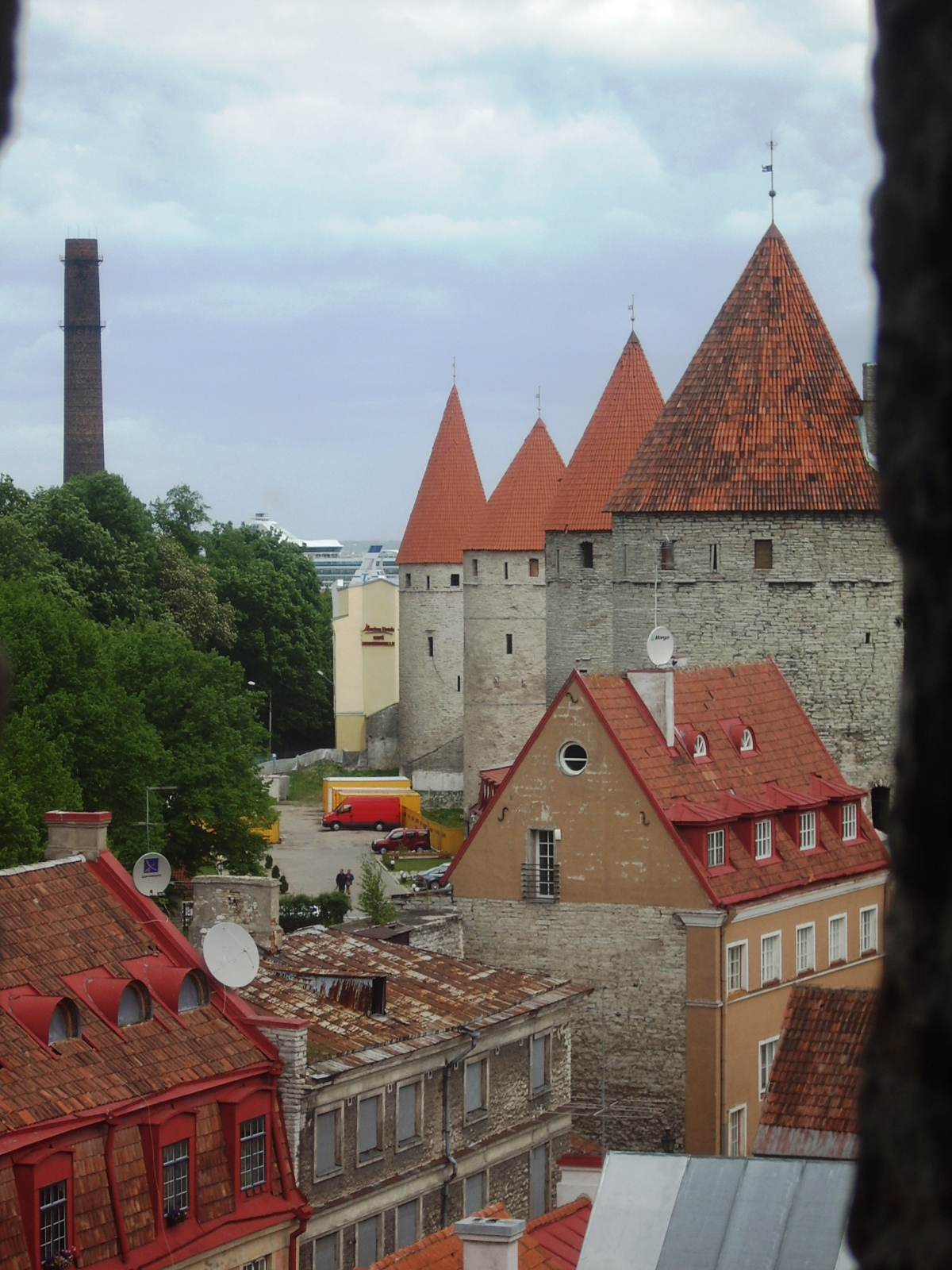
Walltowers of Tallinn

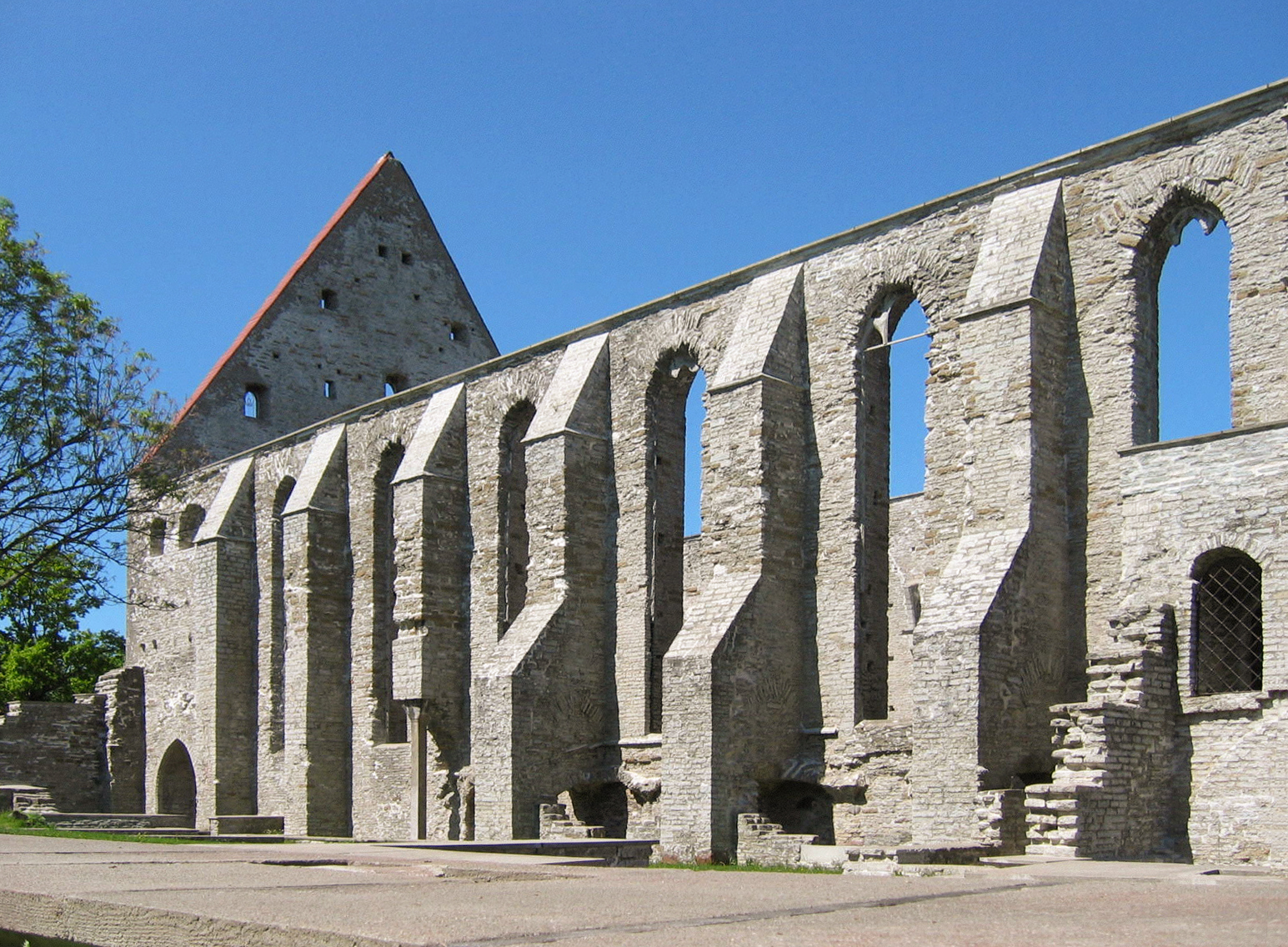
Pirita Convent ruins in Tallinn

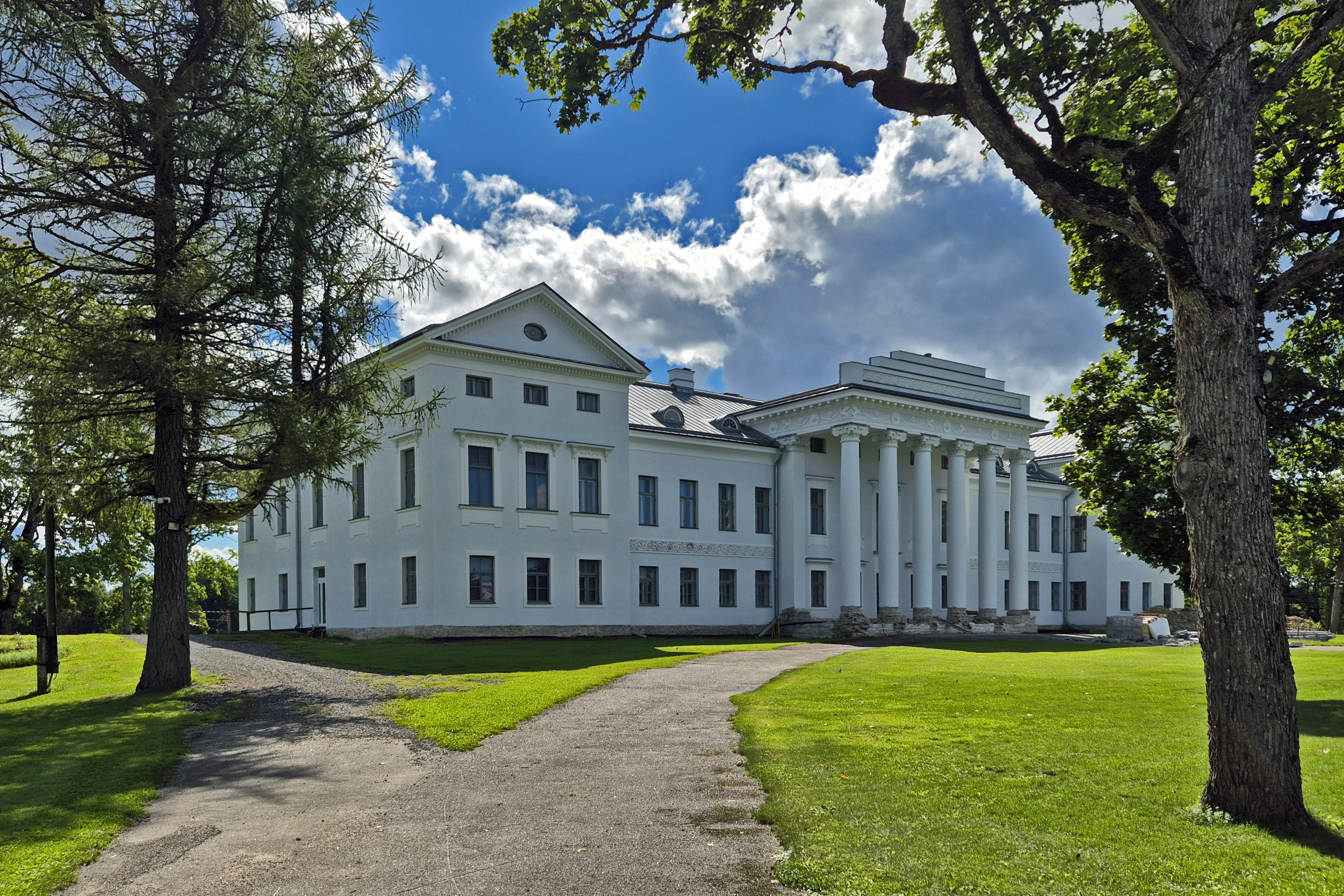
Riisipere manor palace

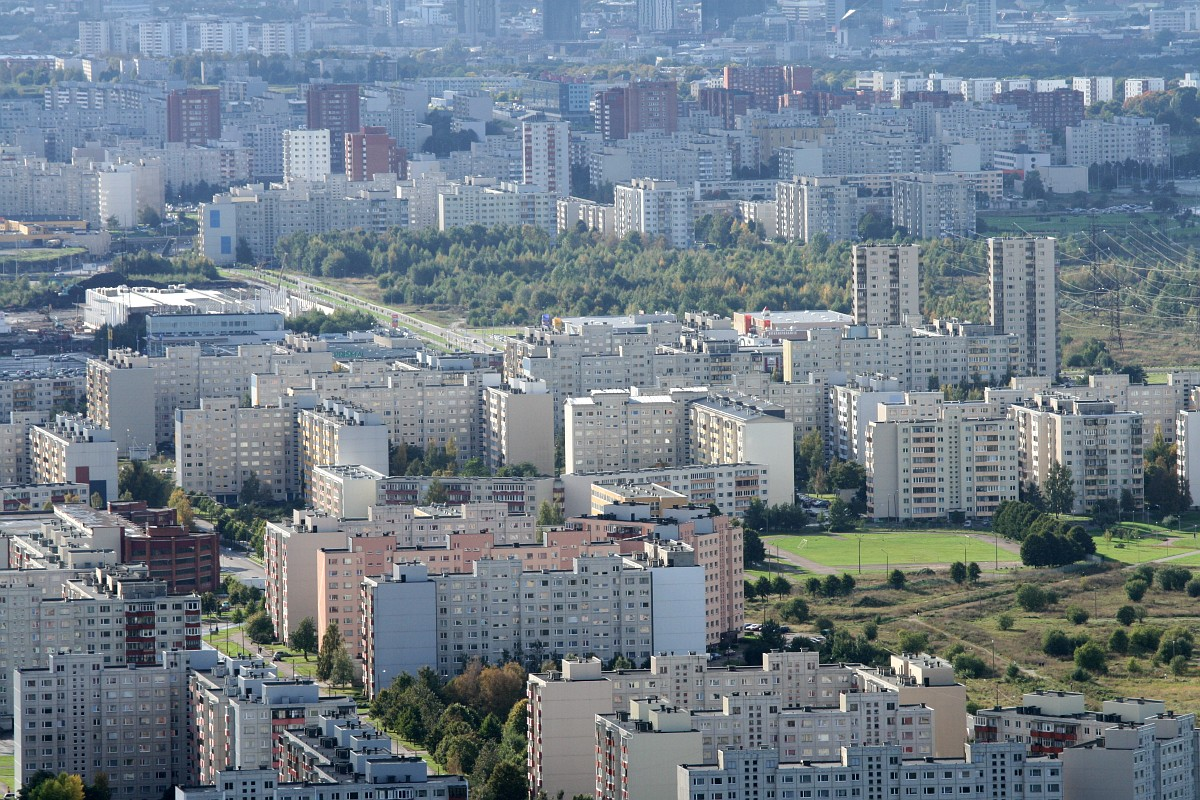
Tallinn Lasnamäe district

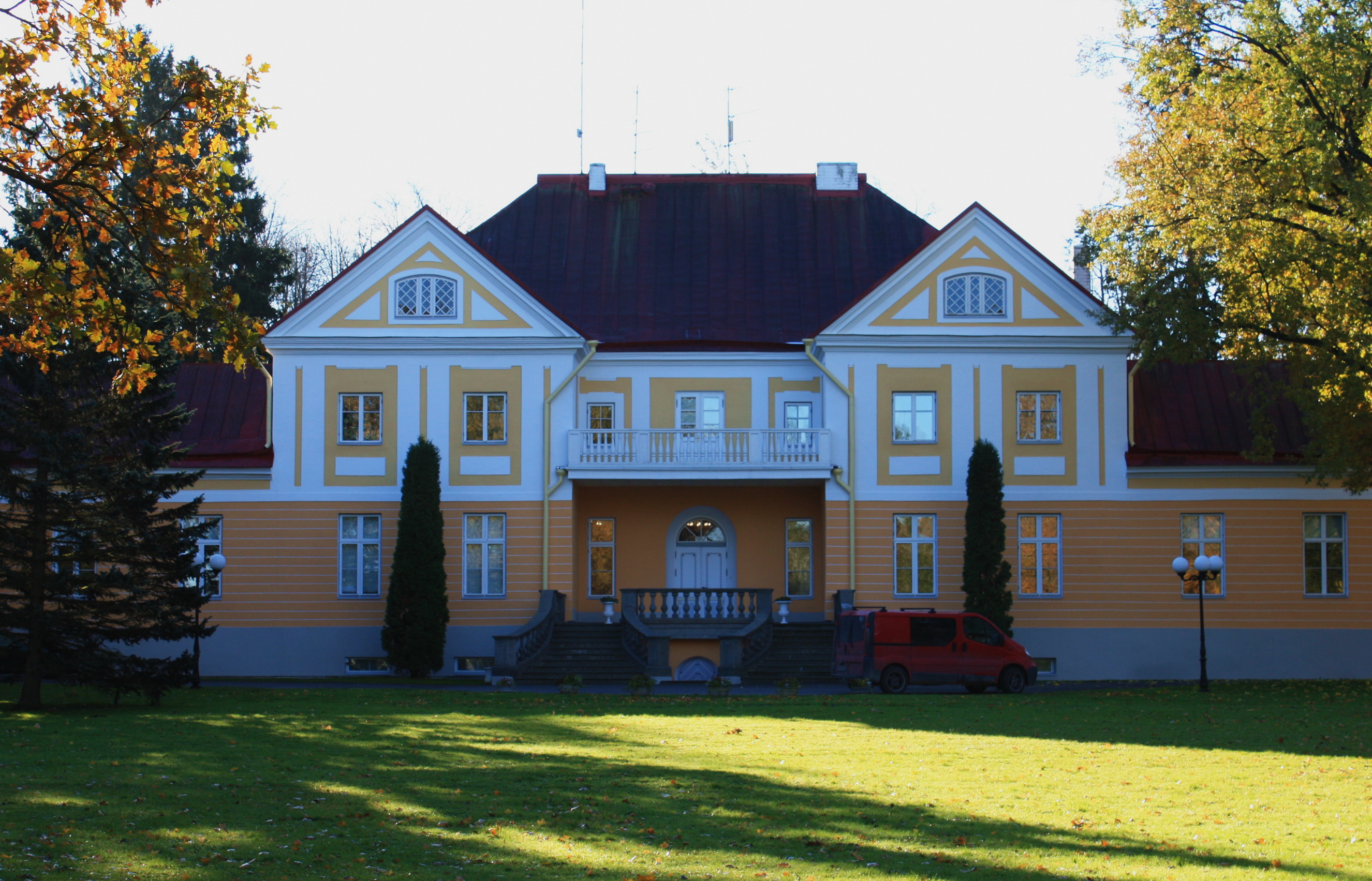
Maardu Manor

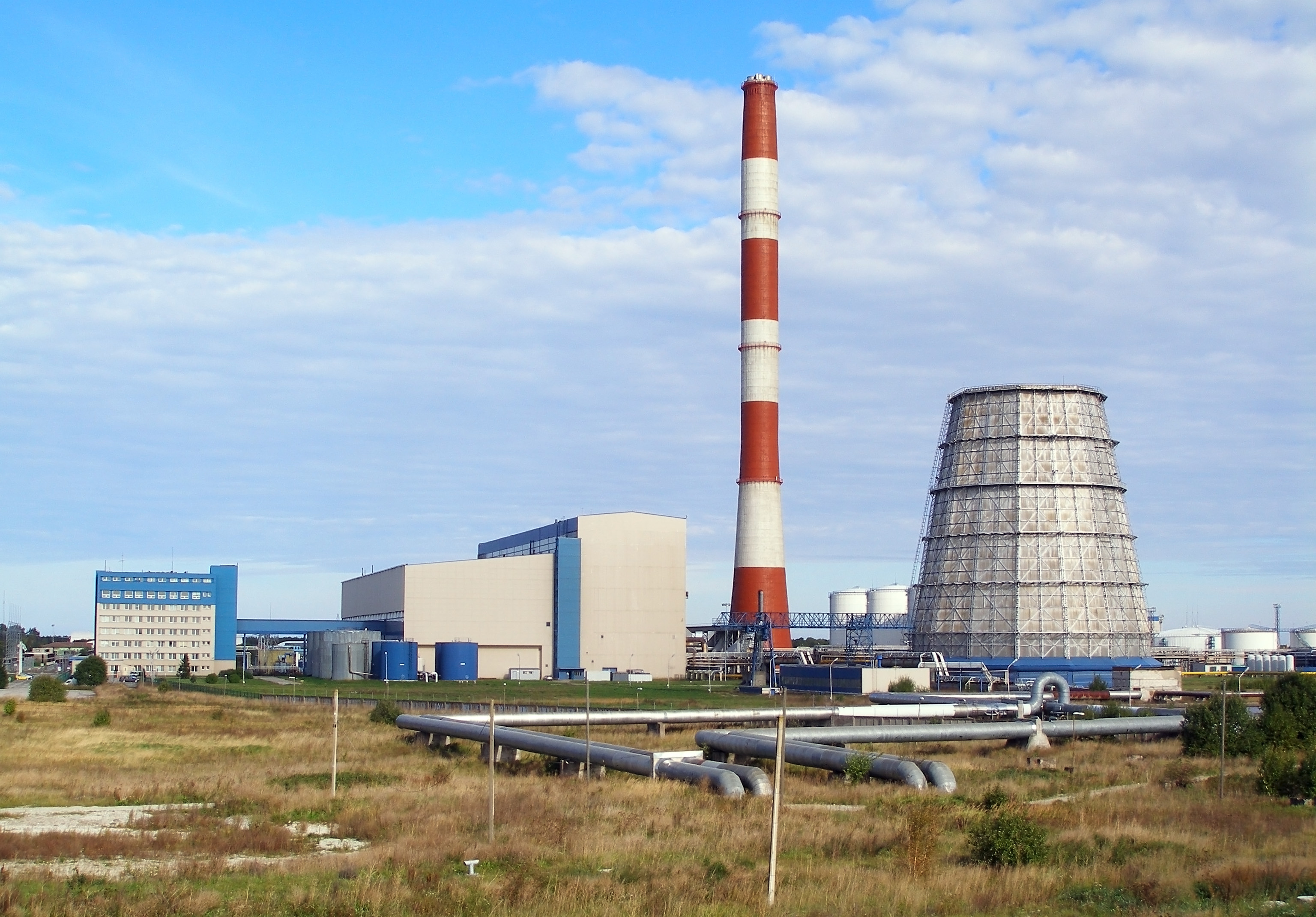
Iru Power Plant

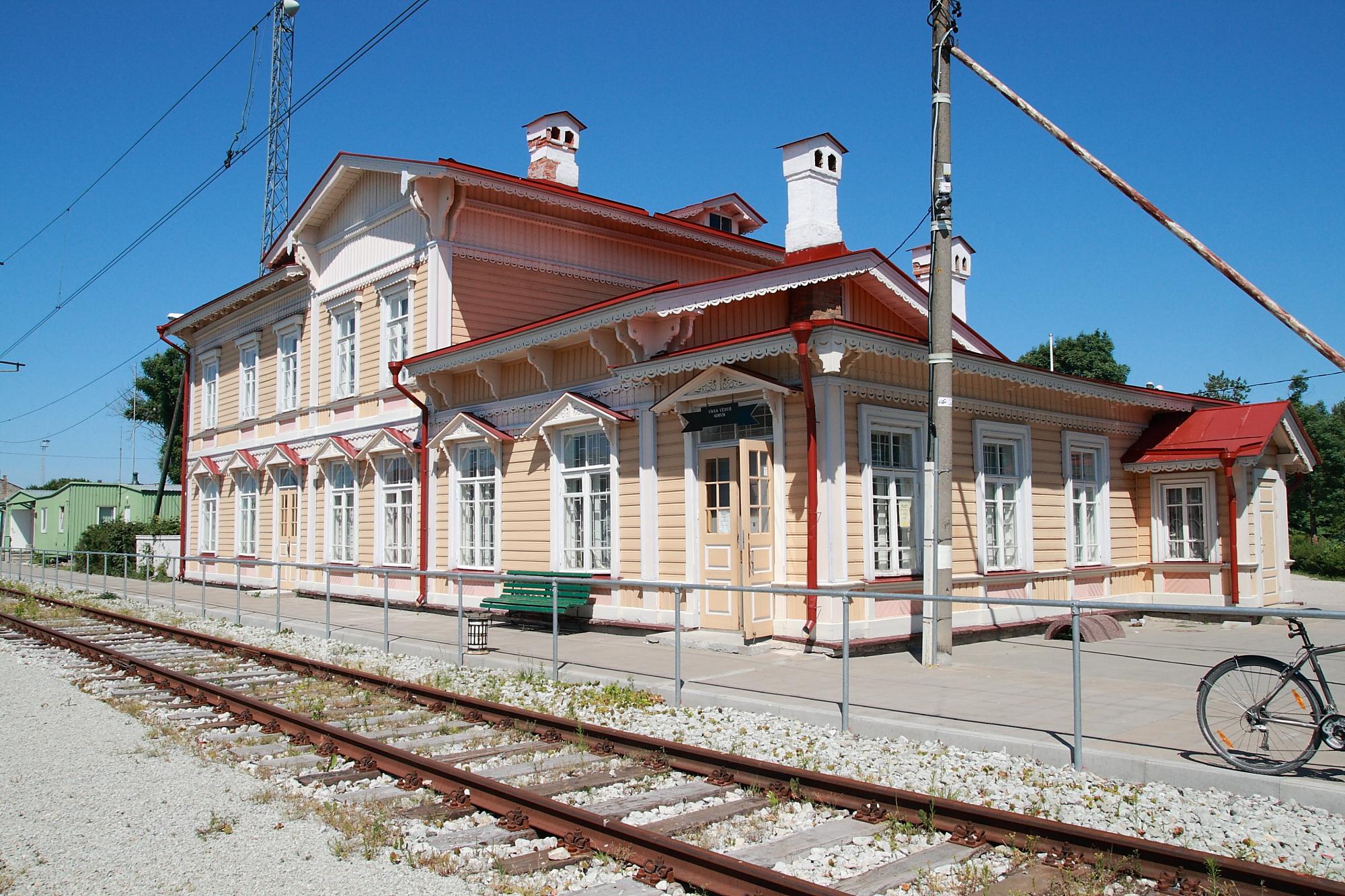
Paldiski railway station

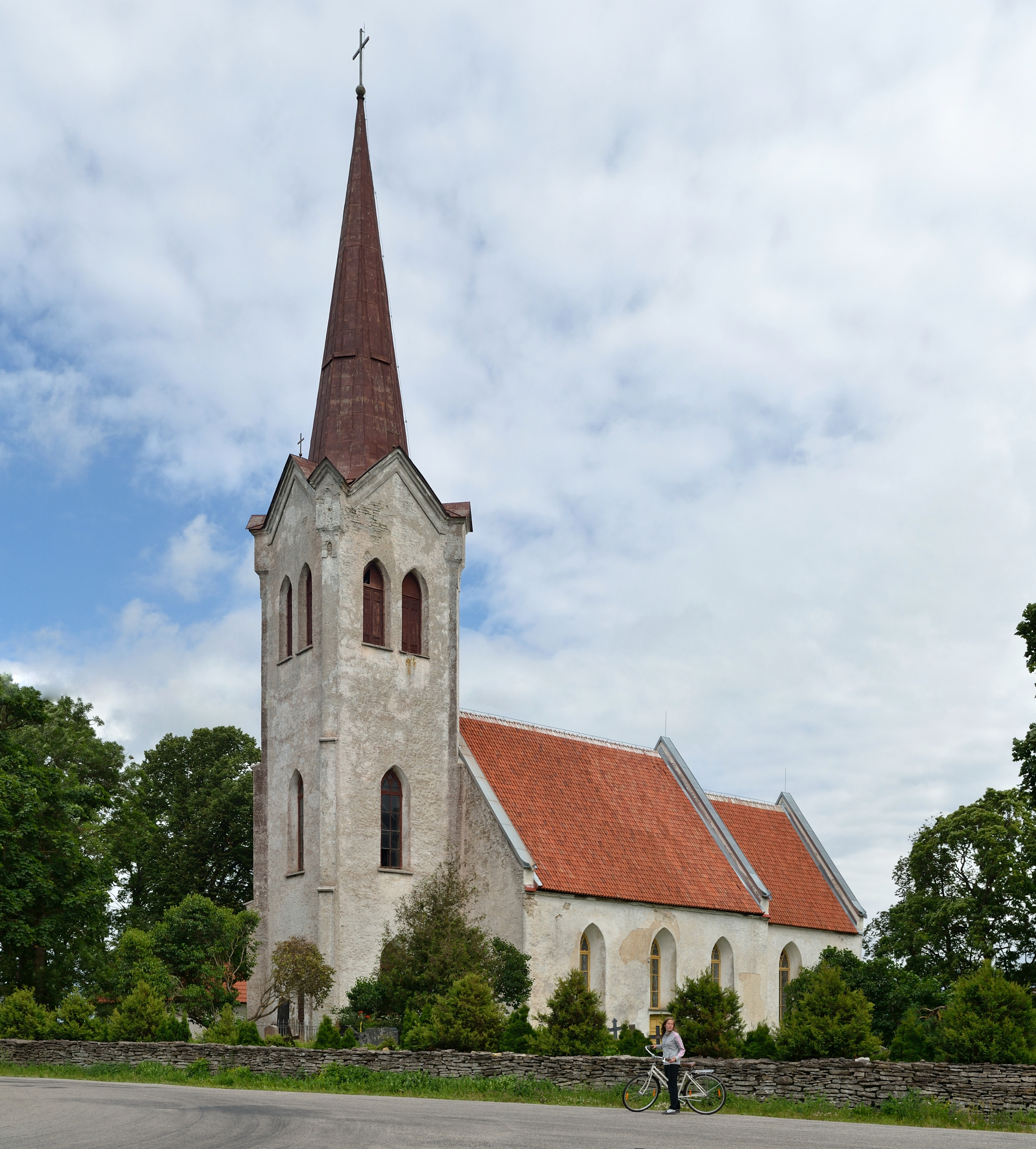
Jõelähtme Church

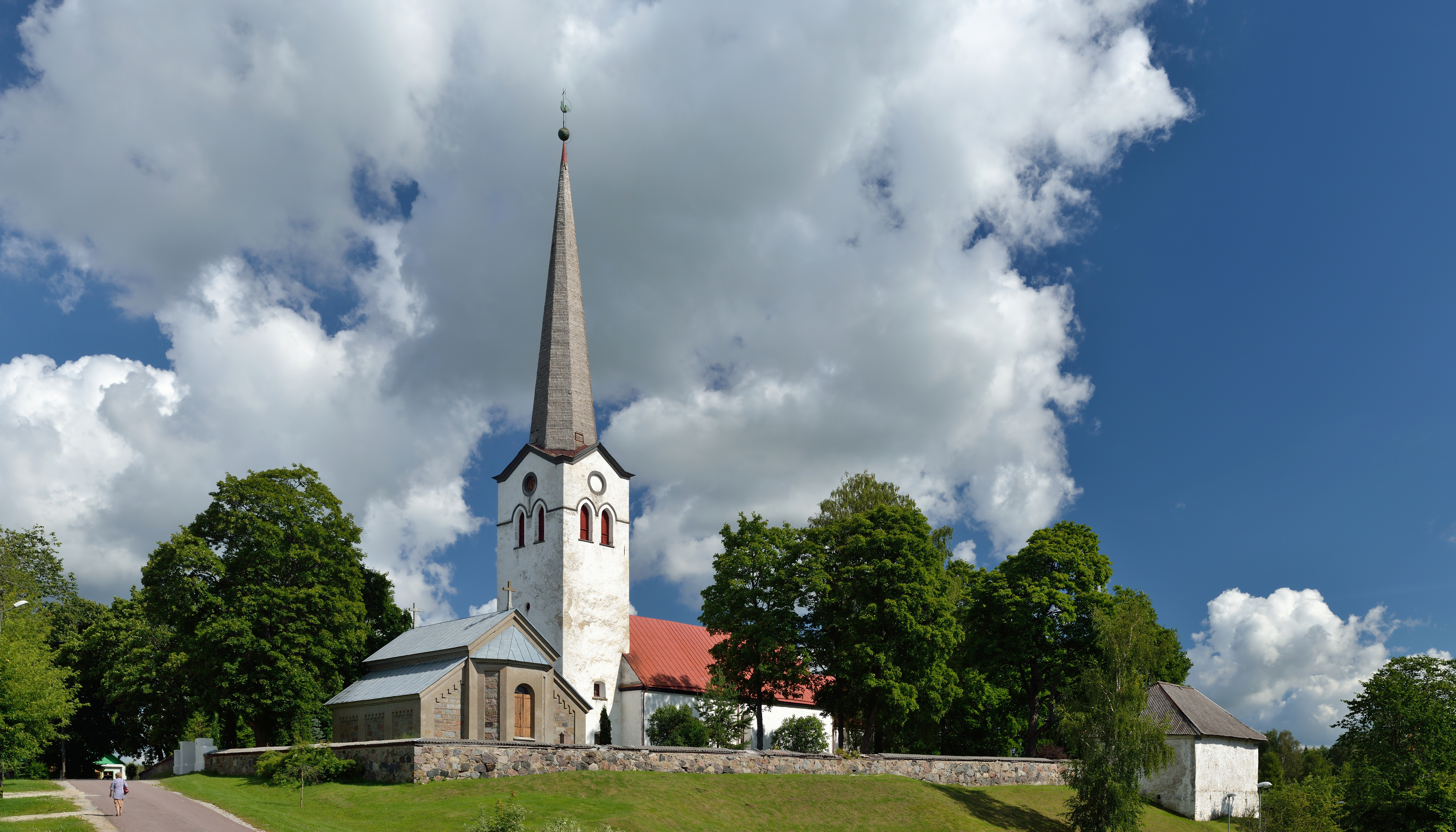
Kose Church

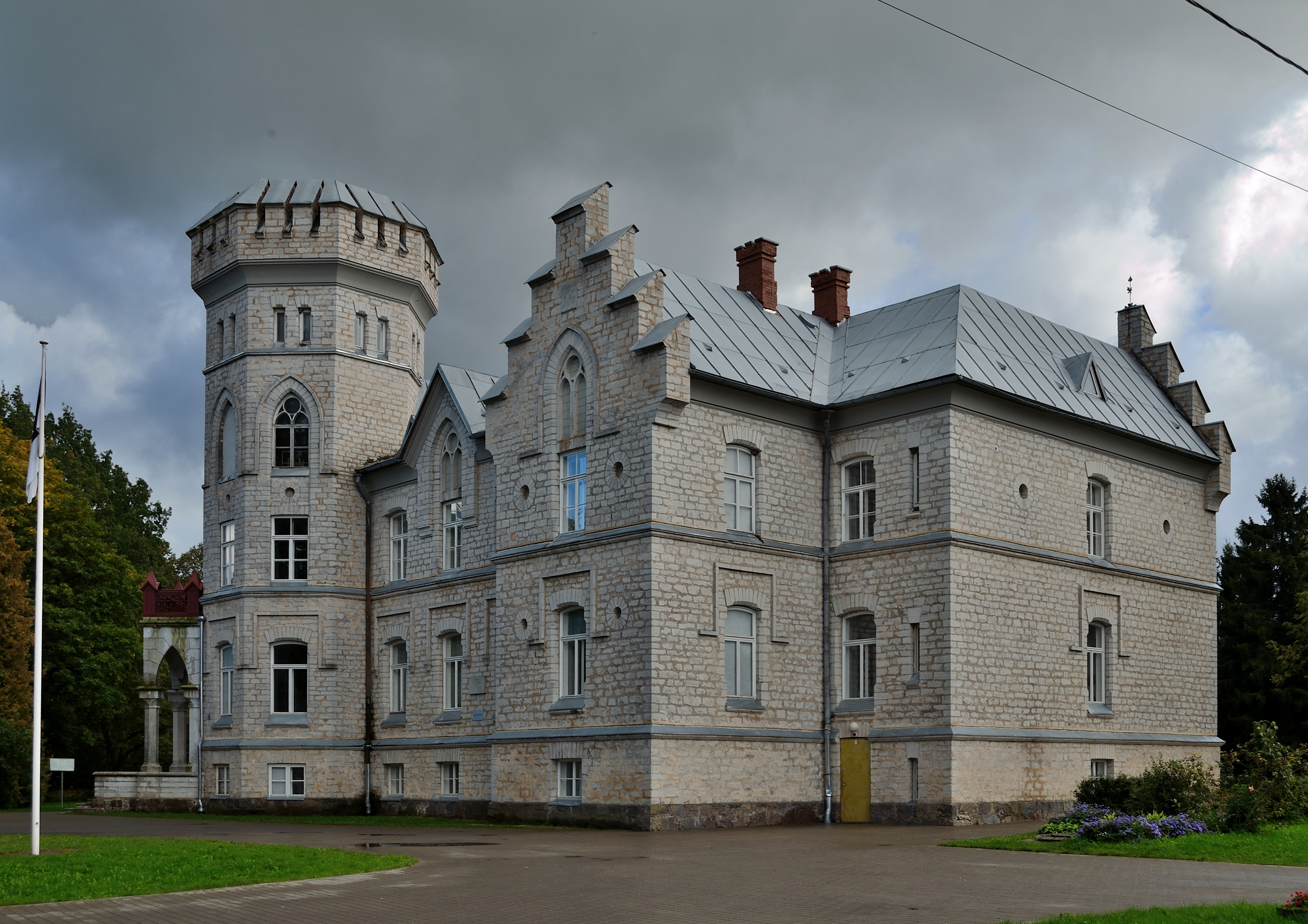
Vasalemma Manor

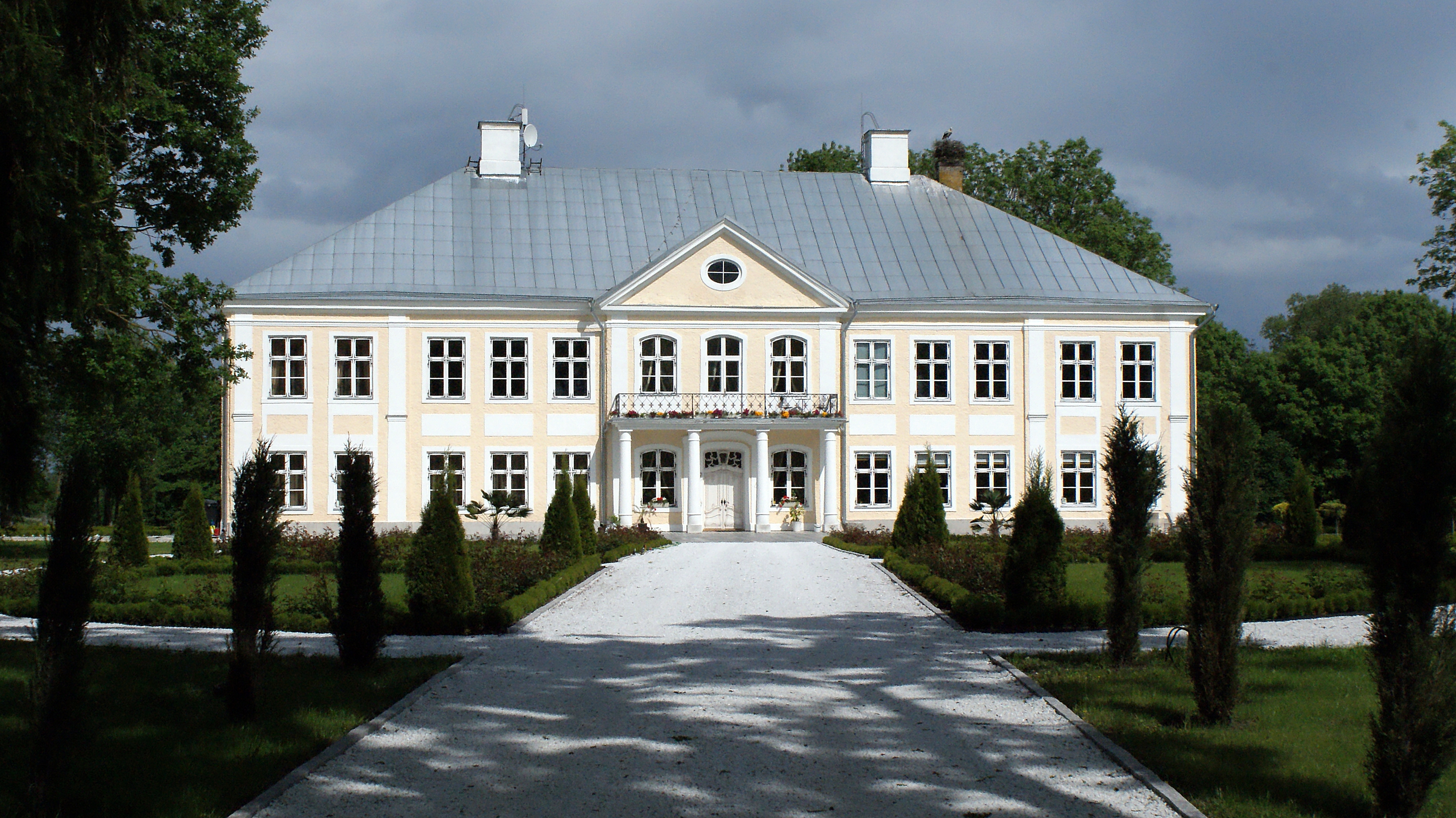
Ääsmäe Manor

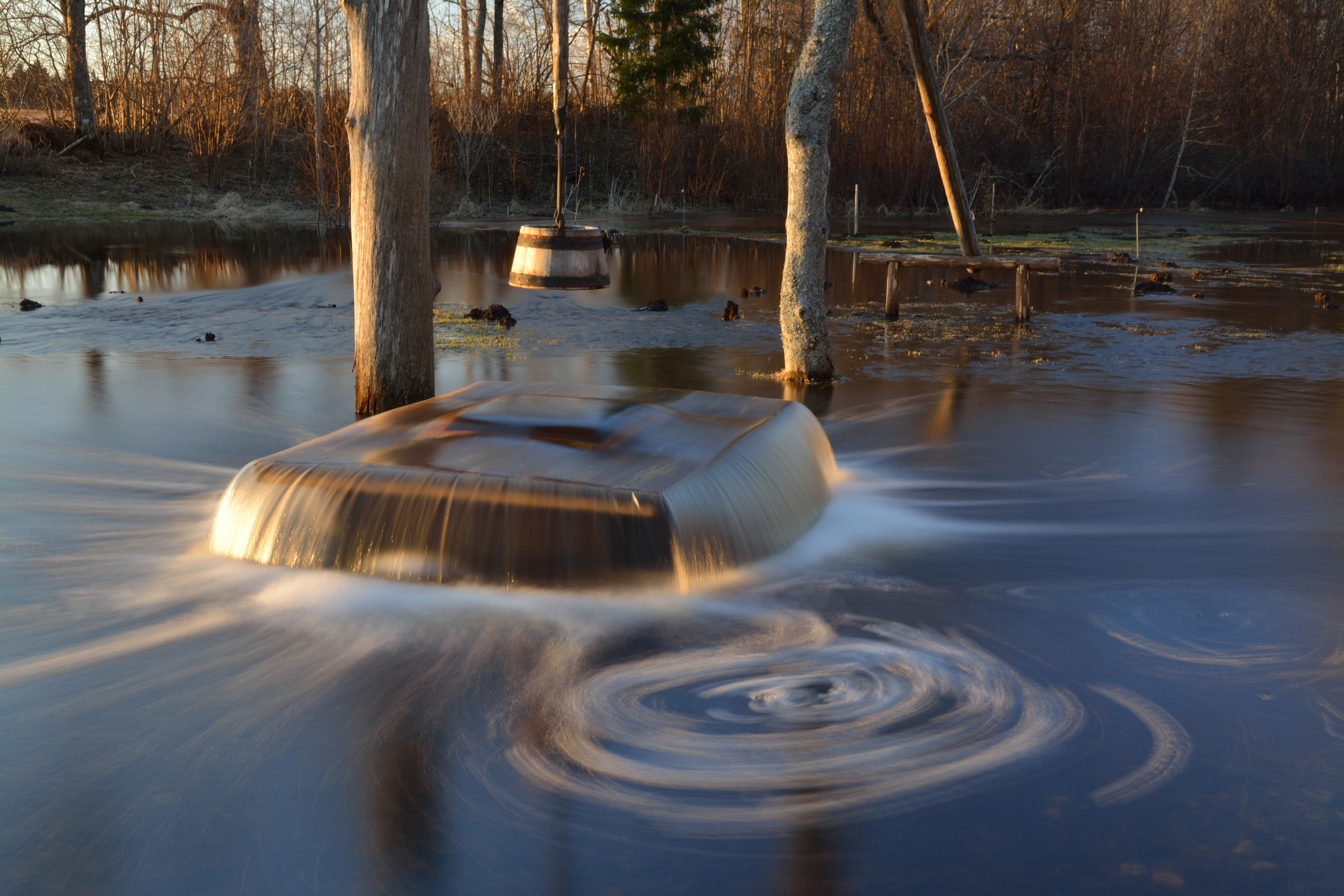
Tuhala "Witch's Well"

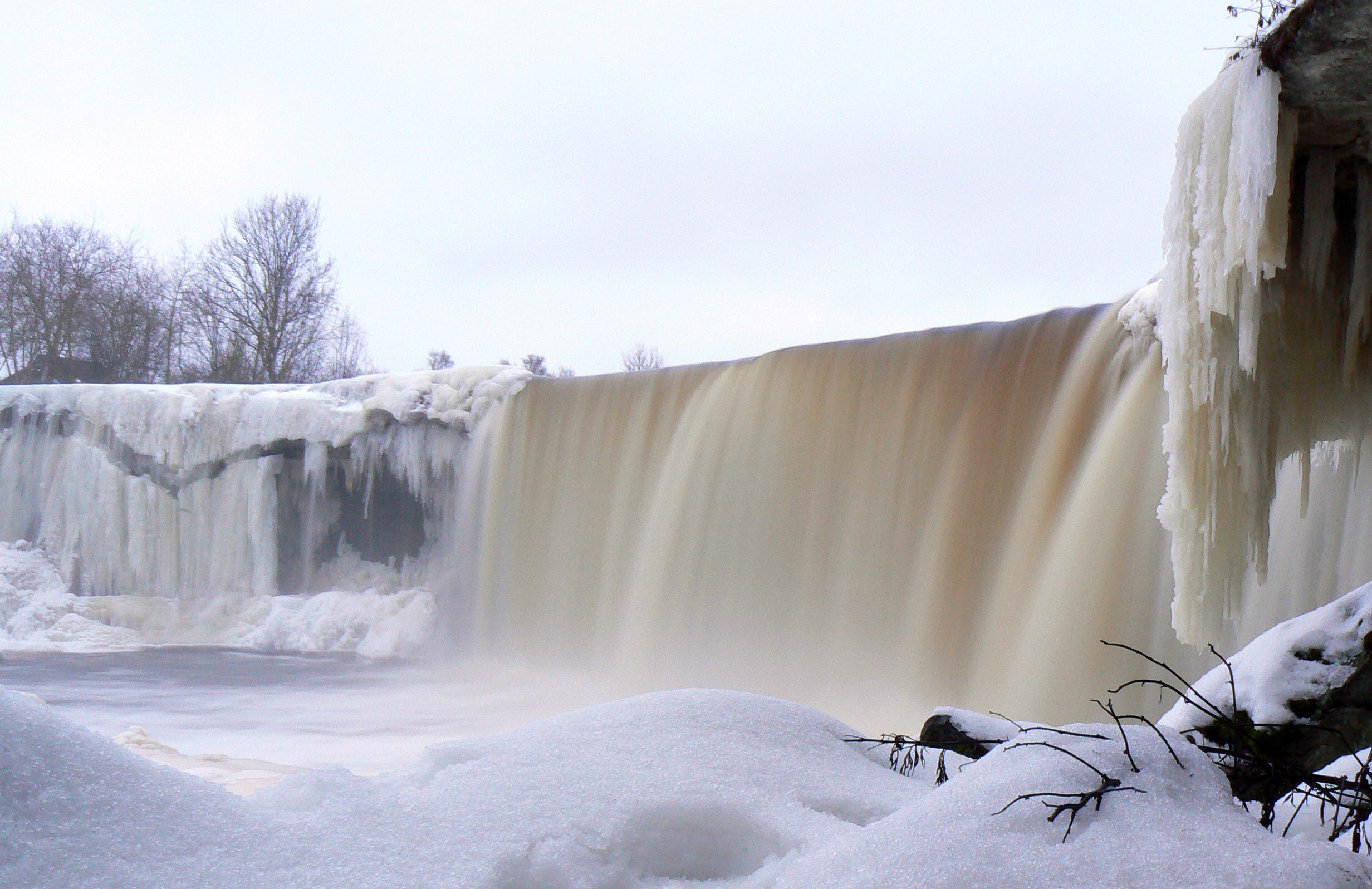
Jägala Waterfall

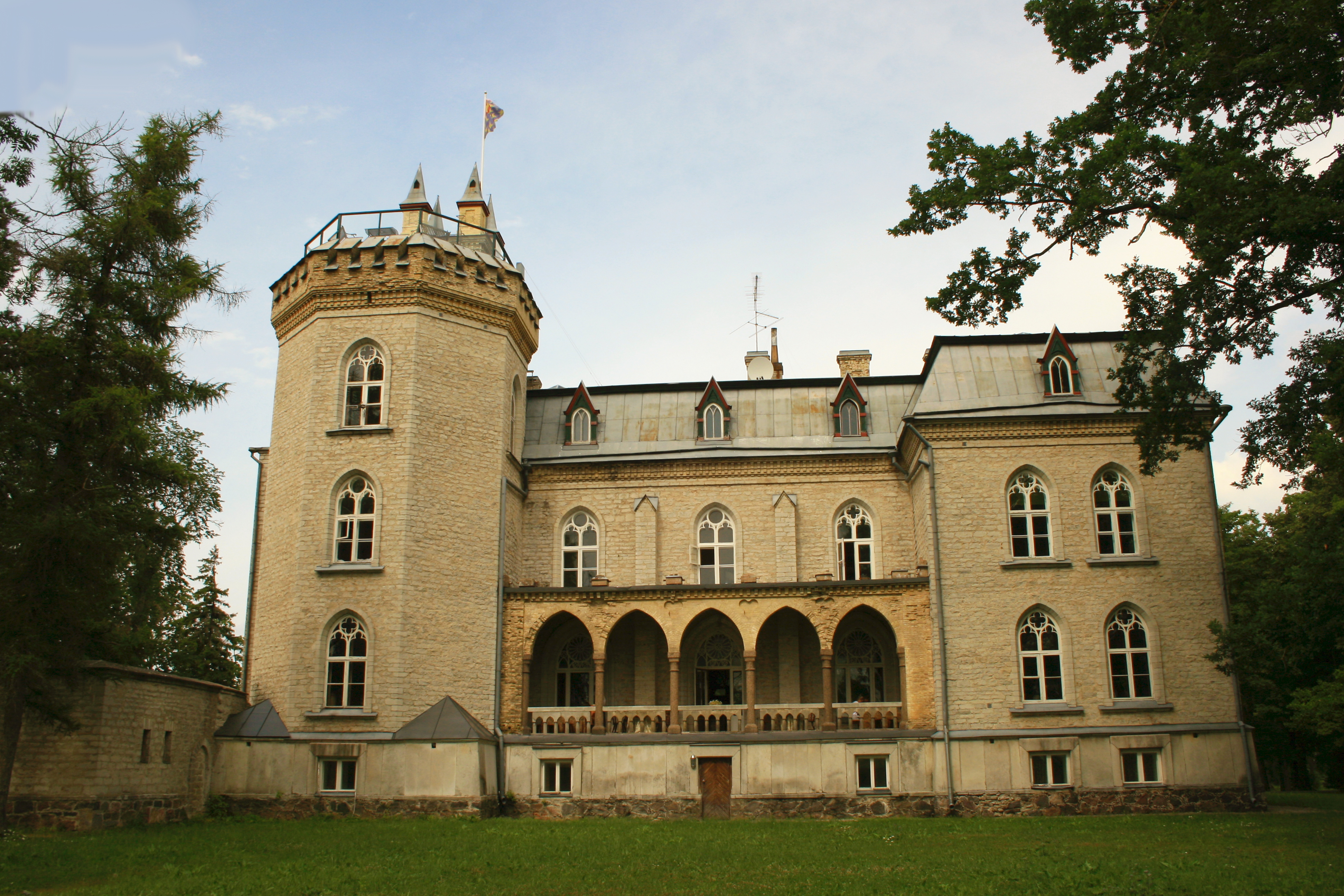
Laitse manor

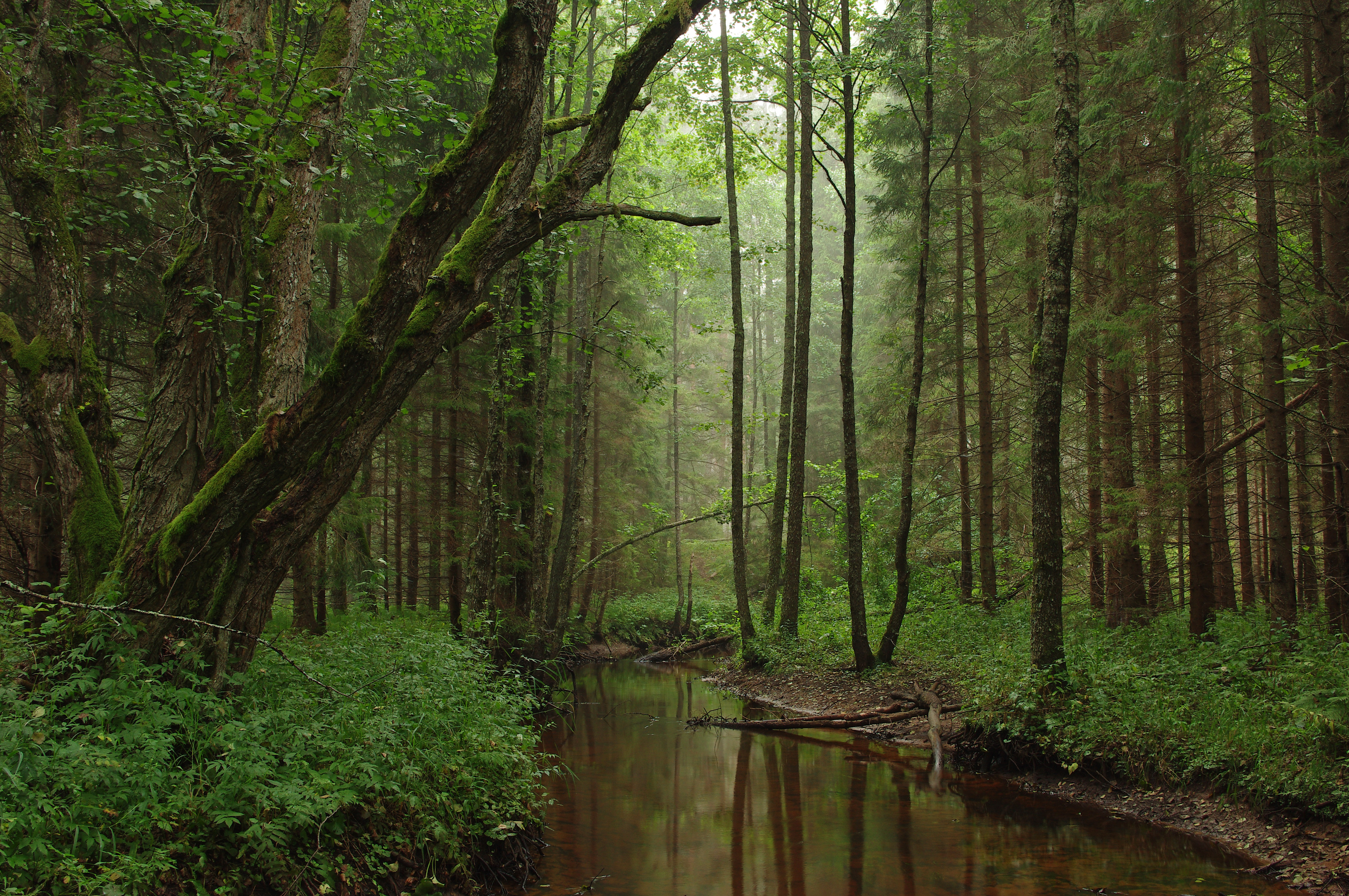
Tarvasjõgi river

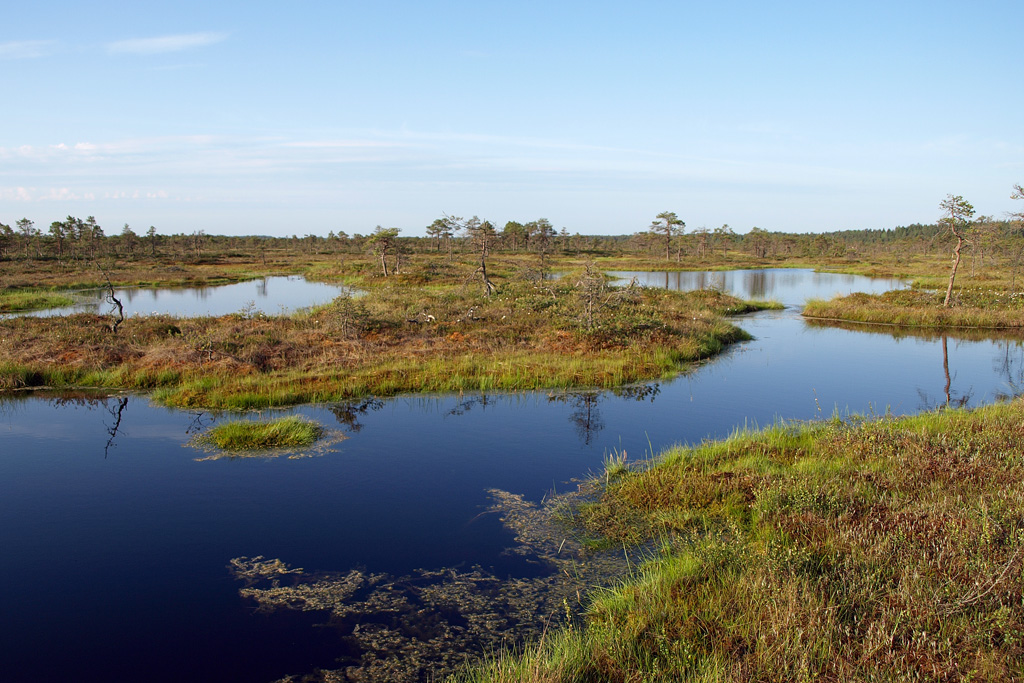
Kakerdaja bog
