= Ruila Nature Reserve =

Protected area in Estonia

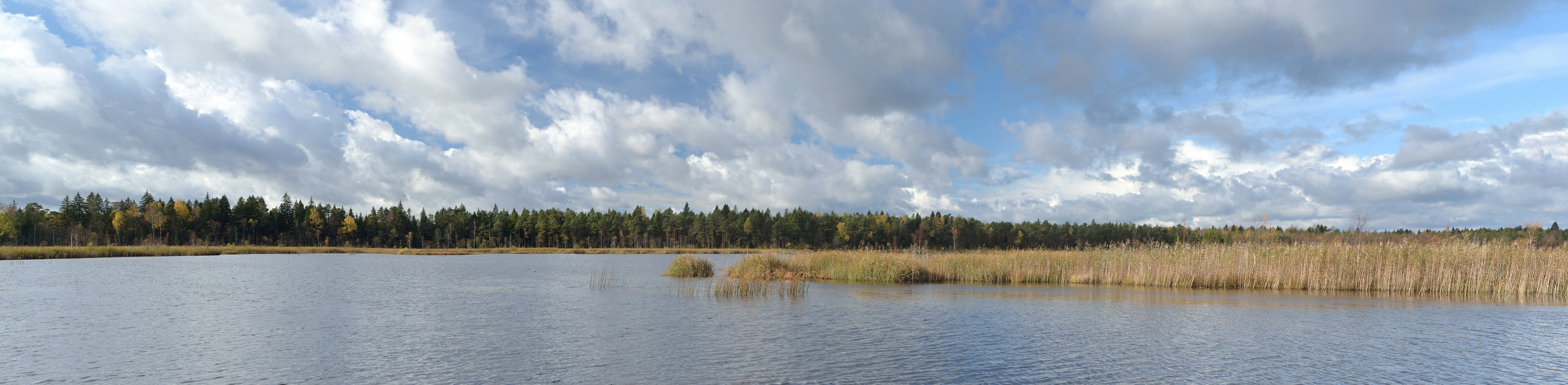

- Location within Estonia
- Location: Estonia
- Nearest city: Ruila
- Coordinates: 59°10′N 24°25′E
- Area: 831 ha (2,050 acres)
- Established: 2005

Ruila Nature Reserve is a nature reserve which is located in Harju County, Estonia.

The area of the nature reserve is 831 ha.

The protected area was founded in 2005 to protect valuable habitat types and threatened species in Pohla, Ruila, Mõnuste and Allika villages (all in former Kernu Parish).
