= Kangro (surname) =

Family name

Kangro is a common Estonian surname.

== Notable persons ==
- Bernard Kangro (1910–1994), writer and poet
- Eva Merike Kangro-Pennar (1950–1997), journalist and linguist
- Evald Kangro (1913–1941), military man
- Gunnar Kangro (1913–1975), mathematician
- Karl Kangro (1861–1935), veterinarian
- Kirke Kangro (born 1975), artist
- Kristjan Kangro, entrepreneur and investor
- Maarja Kangro (born 1973), translator and poet
- Mart Kangro, dancer and choreographer
- Peeter Kangro (1901–1990), military man
- Raimo Kangro (1949–2001), composer and pedagogue
- Rasmus Kangro-Pool (1890–1963), literary and theatre critic
- Tauno Kangro (born 1966), sculptor
- Tiina Kangro (born 1961), journalist and politician

== See also ==
- Kangur (surname)
