= Kirikla =

Village in Estonia

- Location within Estonia
- Coordinates: 59°08′32″N 24°32′44″E
- Country: Estonia
- County: Harju County
- Parish: Saue Parish

Area
  - Total: 5.1 km^{2} (2.0 sq mi)

Population (1 January 2007)
  - Total: 17
- Time zone: UTC+2 (EET)

Kirikla is a village in Saue Parish, Harju County, Estonia. It borders Kohatu village to the north, Kernu village to the west, Kustja village to the south, and Rapla County to the east. Prior to the administrative reform of Estonian local governments in 2017, the village belonged to Kernu Parish.
