= Kangur =

Kangur may refer to:

- Kangur (surname), Estonian surname
- Kangur, Afghanistan
- Kangur, Iran
