= Kohatu =

Village in Estonia

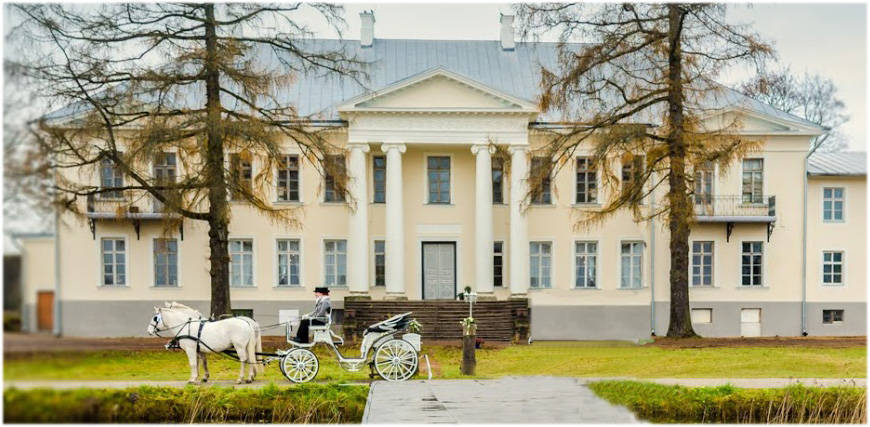
- Kernu manor in Kohatu

- Location within Estonia
- Coordinates: 59°09′49″N 24°31′52″E
- Country: Estonia
- County: Harju County
- Parish: Saue Parish

Area
  - Total: 10.9 km^{2} (4.2 sq mi)

Population (1 January 2007)
  - Total: 192
- Time zone: UTC+2 (EET)

Kohatu is a village in Saue Parish, Harju County, Estonia. It borders Metsanurga village to the north, Mõnuste village to the west, Kernu and Kirikla villages to the south and Rapla County to the east. The territory of the village covers 10.9 km² and had a population of 192 as of January, 2007. Prior to the administrative reform of Estonian local governments in March 2017, the village belonged to Kernu Parish.
