= Kangro =

Kangro may refer to:

- Kangro, a village in Tibet
- Kangro (surname), Estonian surname
- Kristjan Kangro, Estonian entrepreneur

== See also ==
- Kangru (disambiguation)
