= Estonia in the Eurovision Song Contest 1994 =

- Eurovision Song Contest 1994
- Participating broadcaster: Eesti Televisioon (ETV)
- Country: Estonia
- Selection process: Eurolaul '94
- Selection date: 26 February 1994

Competing entry
- Song: "Nagu merelaine"
- Artist: Silvi Vrait
- Songwriters: Ivar Must; Leelo Tungal

Placement
- Final result: 24th, 2 points

Participation chronology

Estonia was represented at the Eurovision Song Contest 1994 with the song "Nagu merelaine", composed by Ivar Must, with lyrics by Leelo Tungal, and performed by Silvi Vrait. The Estonian participating broadcaster, Eesti Televisioon (ETV), organised the national final Eurolaul '94 in order to select its entry for the contest. Ten songs competed in the national final and "Nagu merelaine" performed by Silvi Vrait was selected as the winner by a jury panel. This was the first-ever entry from Estonia in the Eurovision Song Contest, and the first-ever entry performed in Estonian in the contest.

Estonia competed in the Eurovision Song Contest which took place on 30 April 1994. Performing during the show in position 10, Estonia placed twenty-fourth out of the 25 participating countries, scoring 2 points.

== Background ==
The Estonian national broadcaster, Eesti Televisioon (ETV), confirmed its debut at the Eurovision Song Contest 1994 on 7 August 1993, having been unable to debut in the previous contest by failing to pass the qualifying round. As part of its duties as participating broadcaster, ETV organises the selection of its entry in the Eurovision Song Contest and broadcasts the event in the country. The broadcaster announced on 1 October 1993 the organisation of Eurolaul '94 in order to select its 1994 entry.

== Before Eurovision ==
=== Eurolaul '94 ===
Eurolaul '94 was the second edition of the national selection Eurolaul organised by ETV to select its entry for the Eurovision Song Contest 1994. The competition consisted of a ten-song final on 26 February 1994 at the Linnahall in Tallinn, hosted by Reet Oja and Guido Kangur and broadcast on ETV.

==== Competing entries ====
On 1 October 1993, ETV opened the submission period for artists and composers to submit their entries up until 10 January 1994. 34 submissions were received by the deadline. An 11-member jury panel selected ten finalists from the submissions and the selected songs were announced on 14 January 1994. The selection jury consisted of Anne Erm (Eesti Raadio music editor), Heli Lääts (singer), Peeter Vähi (composer), Sven Aabreldaal (music manager), Urmas Leinfeld (Raadio 2 chief editor), Allan Roosileht (Raadio 2 music editor), Priit Hõbemägi (culture critic), Mihkel Raud (musician), Maire Radsin (director), Tõnis Kõrvits (arranger), Aarne Saluveer (choir conductor) and Jaak Joala (musician).

Artist	Song	Songwriter(s)
Airi Allvee	"Hingemaa"	Eero Raun, Kalle Koppel
Evelin Samuel	"Soovide puu"	Kaari Sillamaa, Priit Pajusaar
Evelin Samuel	"Unelind"	Kaari Sillamaa, Priit Pajusaar
Hedvig Hanson and Pearu Paulus	"Kallim kullast"	Kaari Sillamaa, Pearu Paulus, Alar Kotkas, Ilmar Laisaar
Henri Laks	"Lähedus"	Henri Laks
Ivo Linna	"Elavad pildid"	Reet Linna, Heini Vaikmaa
Kadi-Signe Selde	"Miraaž"	Siiri Siimer
Pearu Paulus	"Päikese lapsed"	Leelo Tungal, Elo Kongo
Silvi Vrait	"Nagu merelaine"	Leelo Tungal, Ivar Must
Tõnis Kiis, Anneli Tõevere and Evelin Samuel	"Ime"	Riina Varts, Heini Vaikmaa

==== Final ====
The final took place on 26 February 1994. Ten songs competed and a jury selected "Nagu merelaine" performed by Silvi Vrait as the winner. The jury panel that voted in the final consisted of Kare Kauks (singer and music teacher), Faime Jurno (Madam N representative), Uno Loop (singer and music teacher), Lagle Mäll (singer), Erik Morna (music editor), Toomas Vanem (guitarist), Olav Osolin (Kolm Karu manager), Heidy Tamme (singer and music teacher), Helgi Erilaid (Raadio 2 editor), Lembit Ulfsak (actor), Tarmo Kruusimäe (ETV presenter), Maian Kärmas (student), Kaidi Klein (journalist), Peeter Vähi (composer), Indrek Sei (athlete) and Cathy Korju (model).

Final – 26 February 1994
R/O	Artist	Song	Conductor	Points	Place
1	Evelin Samuel	"Unelind"	Heiki Vahar	73	6
2	Ivo Linna	"Elavad pildid"	Peeter Saul	112	3
3	Airi Allvee	"Hingemaa"	Heiki Vahar	72	7
4	Hedvig Hanson and Pearu Paulus	"Kallim kullast"	Heiki Vahar	147	2
5	Kadi-Signe Selde	"Miraaž"	Olari Elts	56	9
6	Pearu Paulus	"Päikese lapsed"	Heiki Vahar	101	4
7	Evelin Samuel	"Soovide puu"	Heiki Vahar	69	8
8	Henri Laks	"Lähedus"	Heiki Vahar	54	10
9	Silvi Vrait	"Nagu merelaine"	Urmas Lattikas	158	1
10	Tõnis Kiis, Anneli Tõevere and Evelin Samuel	"Ime"	Peeter Saul	86	5

Detailed Jury Votes
R/O	Song	K. Kauks	F. Jurno	U. Loop	L. Mäll	E. Morna	T. Vanem	O. Osolin	H. Tamme	H. Erilaid	L. Ulfsak	T. Kruusimäe	M. Kärmas	K. Klein	P. Vähi	I. Sei	C. Korju	Total
1	"Unelind"	2	2	4	5	7	4	4	4	6	7	3	3	10	4	4	4	73
2	"Elavad pildid"	7	10	8	10	2	10	5	7	5	8	6	4	2	10	10	8	112
3	"Hingemaa"	4	7	1	3	12	1	7	2	1	5	5	6	4	2	5	7	72
4	"Kallim kullast"	8	8	10	8	3	12	12	10	2	12	2	12	12	12	12	12	147
5	"Miraaž"	3	4	2	6	4	2	3	8	4	1	4	1	5	5	1	3	56
6	"Päikese lapsed"	10	6	7	4	8	8	8	6	3	3	1	10	6	8	8	5	101
7	"Soovide puu"	5	3	6	2	5	3	1	5	12	6	7	5	3	1	3	2	69
8	"Lähedus"	1	1	3	1	1	6	2	1	7	4	8	2	7	7	2	1	54
9	"Nagu merelaine"	12	12	12	12	10	7	10	12	10	10	12	8	8	6	7	10	158
10	"Ime"	6	5	5	7	6	5	6	3	8	2	10	7	1	3	6	6	86

== At Eurovision ==
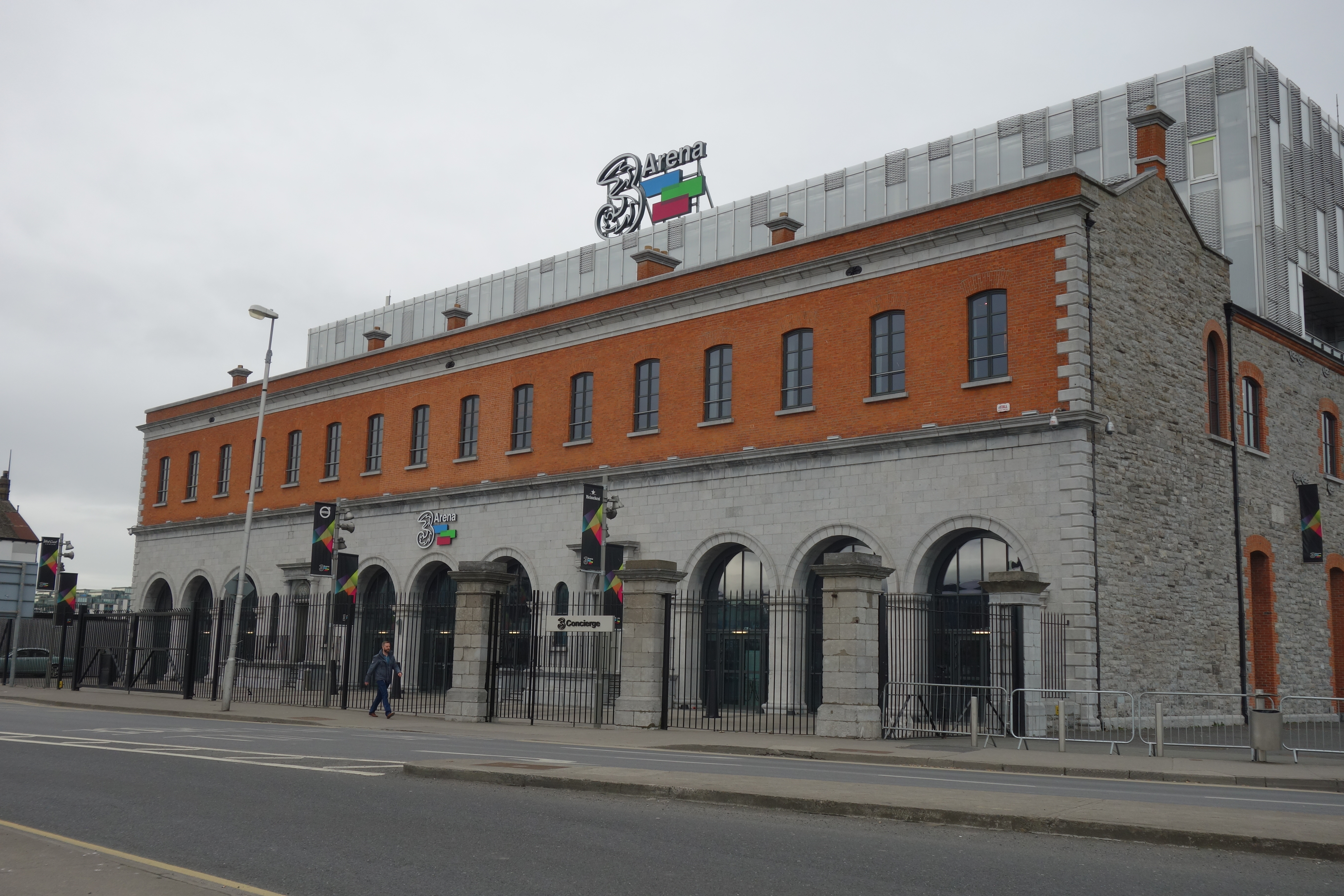
Eurovision Song Contest 1994 took place at the Point Theatre in Dublin, Ireland, on 30 April 1994.

The Eurovision Song Contest 1994 took place at the Point Theatre in Dublin, Ireland, on 30 April 1994. According to the Eurovision rules, the 25-country participant list for the contest was composed of: the winning country from the previous year's contest and host country Ireland, countries that placed higher than the bottom seven of the 1993 contest and any eligible country that did not compete in the 1993 edition. As Estonia was one of the eligible countries which did not compete in the 1993 contest, it was thus permitted to participate. On 16 November 1993, an allocation draw was held which determined the running order and Estonia was set to perform in position 10, following the entry from Switzerland and before the entry from Romania. The Estonian conductor at the contest was Urmas Lattikas, and Estonia finished in twenty-fourth place with 2 points.

The contest was broadcast on ETV (with commentary by Vello Rand) and on STV1. ETV appointed Urve Tiidus as its spokesperson to announce the votes awarded by the Estonian jury during the show.

=== Voting ===
Below is a breakdown of points awarded to Estonian and awarded by Estonia in the contest. The nation awarded its 12 points to Poland in the contest.

Points awarded to Estonia
Score	Country
12 points	
10 points	
8 points	
7 points	
6 points	
5 points	
4 points	
3 points	
2 points	Greece
1 point	

Points awarded by Estonia
Score	Country
12 points	Poland
10 points	Ireland
8 points	Norway
7 points	Malta
6 points	France
5 points	United Kingdom
4 points	Hungary
3 points	Germany
2 points	Sweden
1 point	Russia
