= Silvi Vrait =

Estonian singer

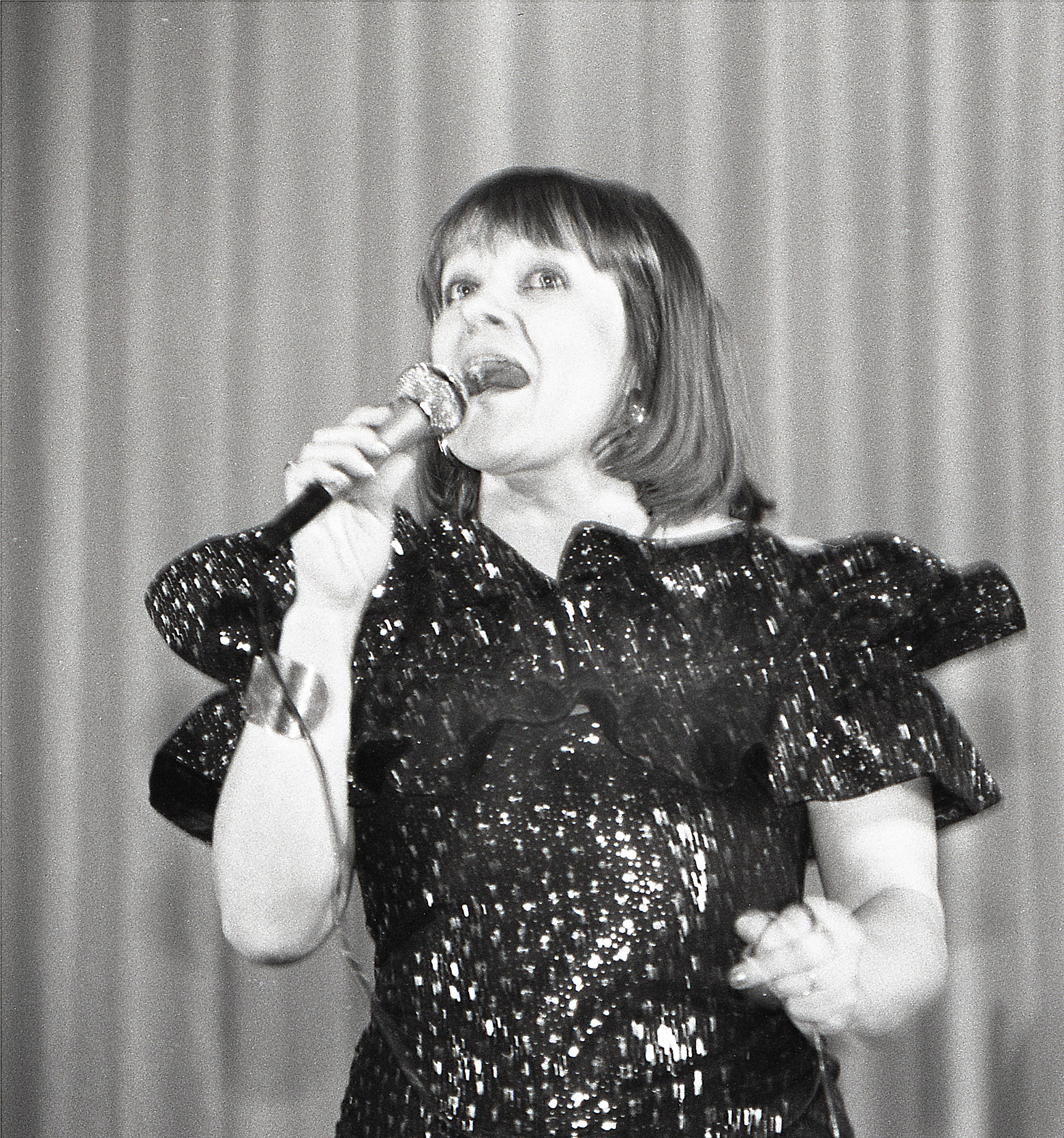
- Silvi Vrait in 1989

Background information
- Born: 28 April 1951; Kehra, then part of Estonian SSR, Soviet Union
- Died: 28 June 2013 (aged 62) Tallinn, Estonia
- Genres: Jazz, country, rock, folk
- Occupations: Singer, music teacher
- Instruments: Vocals, piano
- Years active: 1972–2013

Silvi Vrait (28 April 1951 – 28 June 2013) was an Estonian singer and music teacher.

== Biography ==
Vrait was born in Kehra in 1951 to Einar "Edward" Wright, a Minnesota-born American of Finnish ancestry and his Estonian wife Senta (née Schönberg). She had a half-sister, Pille, five years her senior.

Vrait graduated from the Kehra Music School in 1968 on piano. In 1974 she graduated from the University of Tartu with a degree in English philology. From 1994, she taught English in a secondary school in Tallinn. Vrait coached vocalists, Evelin Samuel and Kaire Vilgats among many at the Georg Ots Music School in Tallinn.

== Stage career ==
Silvi Vrait first appeared on stage in 1972 when she performed in a TV show. She was a member of several pop and rock musical ensembles, including Viker 5, Suuk, Initsiaal and in 1975, she joined the popular band Fix. From 1976 to 1983 she was active in theatre Vanemuine in Tartu. Her style varies from jazz to country and from rock to folk. In the late 1980s, she was an important figure within the Estonian armless struggle for restoring the independence, the Singing Revolution, for at least two recordings, "Väikene rahvas, väikene maa" ("Small Nation, Tiny Country") and "Ei ole üksi ükski maa" ("No Land Is Alone").

She appeared in musicals and operas, such as "Põhjaneitsi" ("The Maid of the North") (Mutik, 1980), Porgy and Bess (Bess, 1985), The King and I (Lady Thiang, 1998), Zorba (Storyteller, 2000), Gypsy (Mama Rose, 2001), Chicago (Mama Morton, 2004) and The Sound of Music (Mother Abbess, 2003, reprised in 2010), Cabaret (Fräulein Schneider, 2012).

In 1994, Vrait was the representative of Estonia at the Eurovision Song Contest, held in Dublin that year. Her song "Nagu merelaine" ended up on 24th out of 25 places, beating only Lithuania who didn't receive any points.

== Death ==
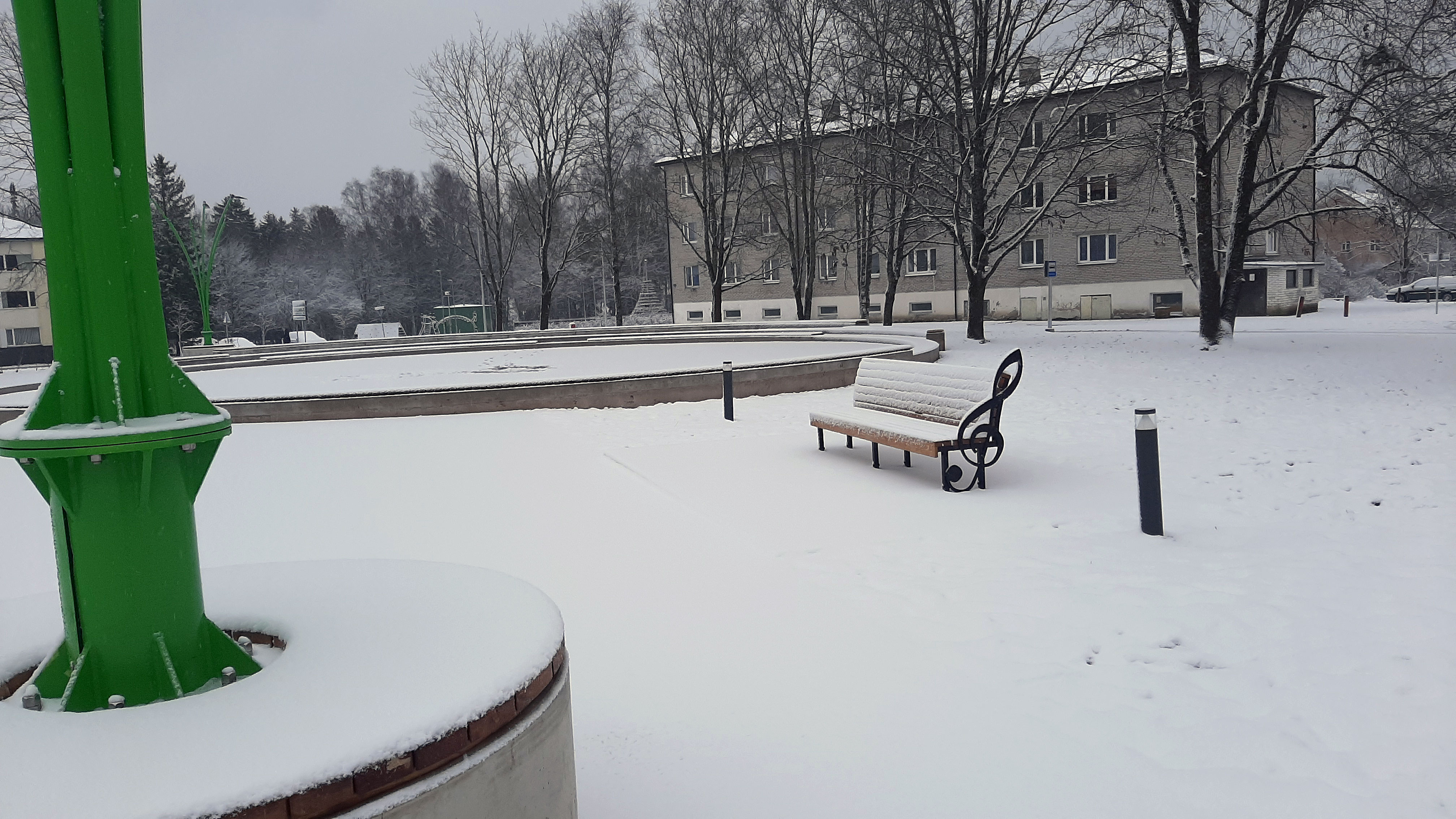
Silvi Vrait memorial bench in Kehra

In 2013 Vrait was hospitalized with a brain tumour and died on 28 June 2013, aged 62. She was buried at Tallinn's Forest Cemetery. Vrait is survived by her son, Silver Vrait. A memorial bench in honour of her was opened at her hometown Kehra in August 2014.

Awards and achievements
Preceded by none	Estonia in the Eurovision Song Contest; 1994	Succeeded by Maarja-Liis Ilus and Ivo Linna with "Kaelakee hääl"
