= Kernu Parish =

Former municipality of Estonia

Coordinates: 59.127769°N 24.468613°E

Kernu Parish Kernu vald
- Former municipality of Estonia
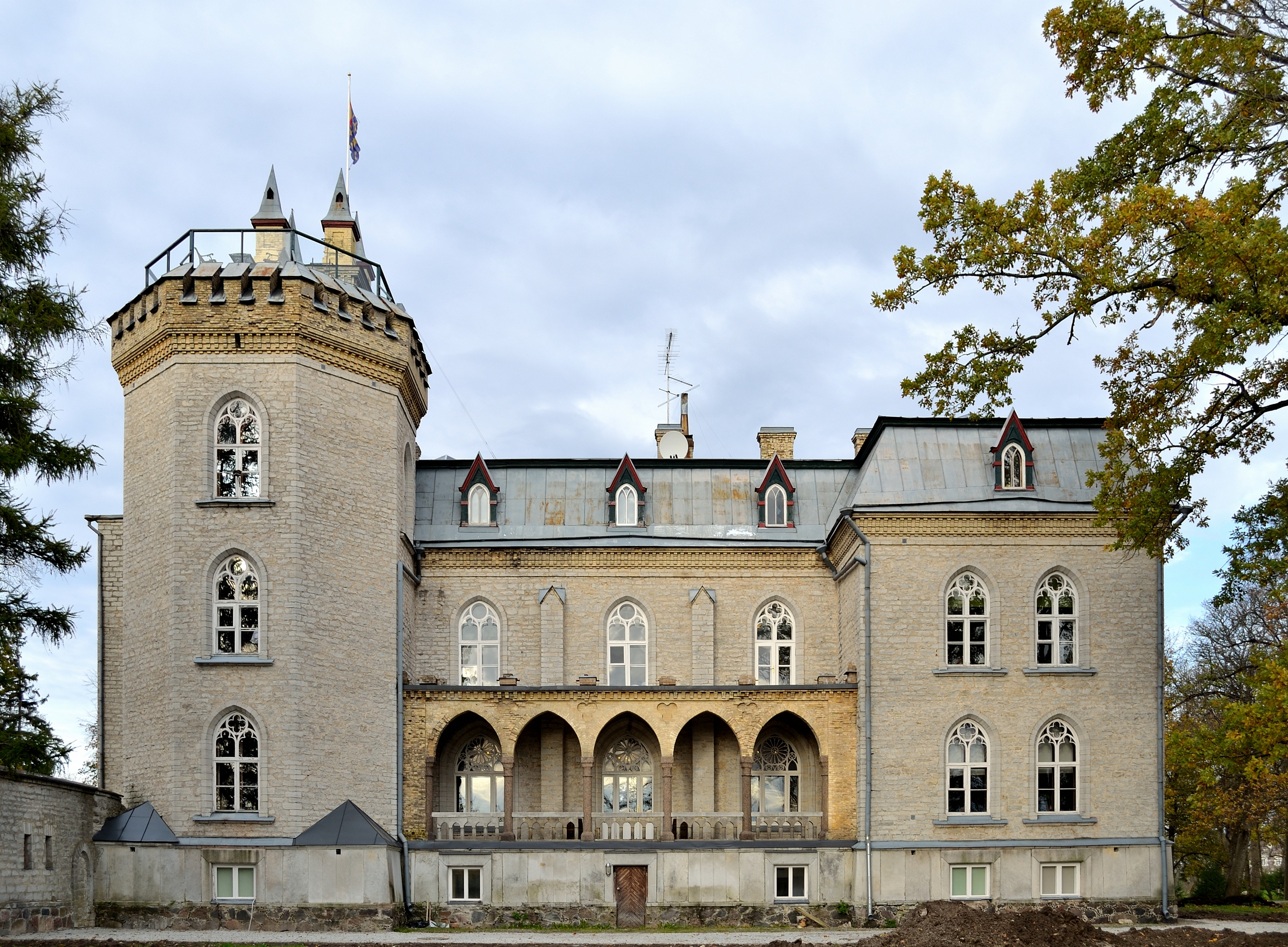
- Laitse Manor

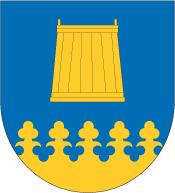
- Flag Coat of arms

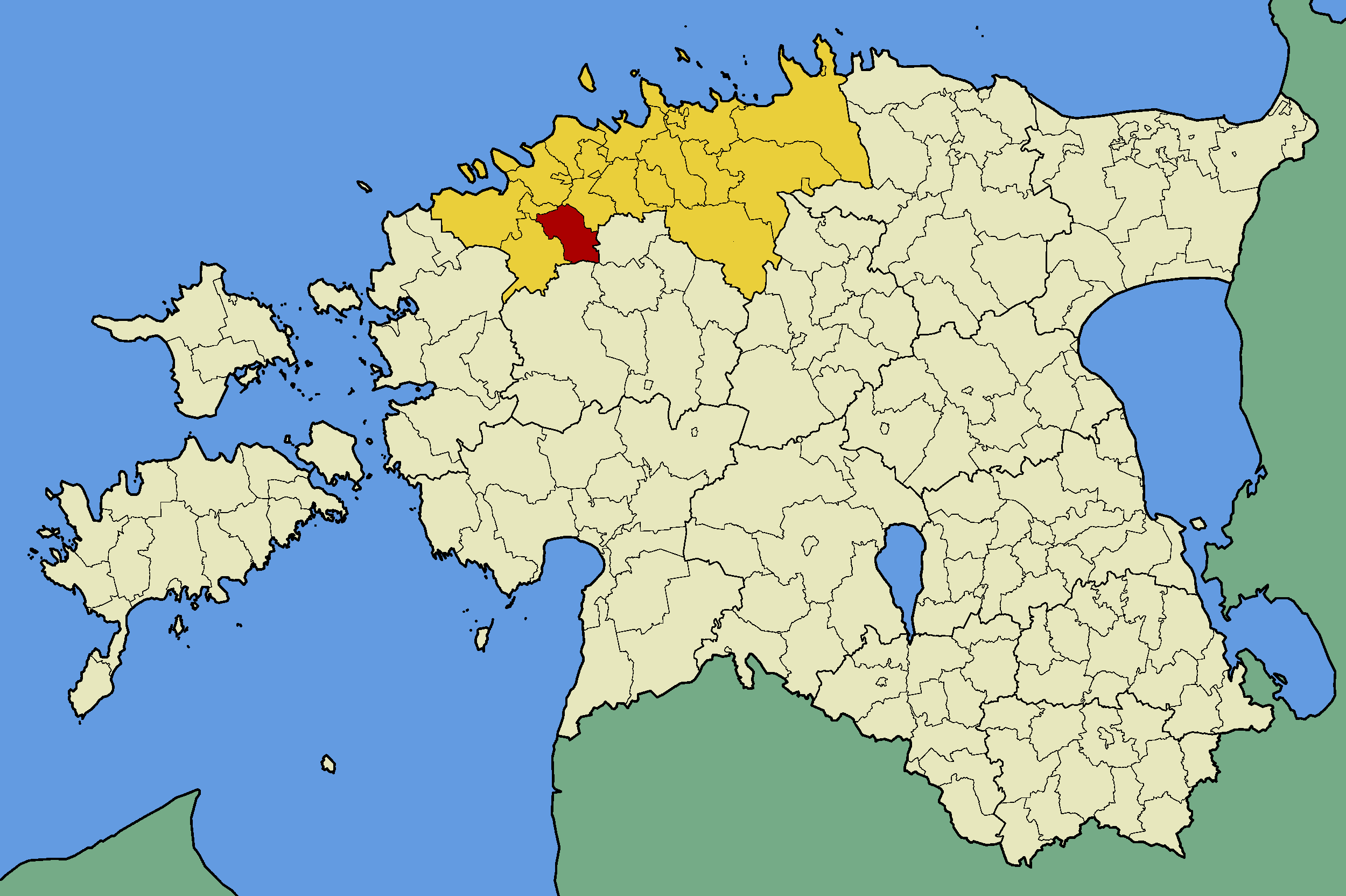
- Kernu Parish within Harju County.
- Country: Estonia
- County: Harju County
- Administrative centre: Haiba

Government
  - Mayor: Enn Karu

Area
  - Total: 174.65 km^{2} (67.43 sq mi)

Population (01.01.2009)
  - Total: 2,077
  - Density: 11.89/km^{2} (30.80/sq mi)
- Website: www.kernu.ee

Kernu Parish (Estonian: Kernu vald) was a rural municipality in north-western Estonia. It was a part of Harju County. The municipality had a population of 2,077 (as of 1 January 2009) and covered an area of 174.65 km^{2}. The population density was 11.9 inhabitants per km^{2}.

There were 17 villages in Kernu Parish: Allika, Haiba, Hingu, Kaasiku, Kabila, Kernu, Kibuna, Kirikla, Kohatu, Kustja, Laitse, Metsanurga, Mõnuste, Muusika, Pohla, Ruila, Vansi.

== Local government ==
The mayor (vallavanem) was Enn Karu and chairman of the council (volikogu esimees) was Karl-Erik Tender.

== Symbolism ==
The main symbol in the arms of Kernu Parish was golden vat (est: Kirn). It symbolised the historical first owner of Kernu (his name was Kirnu).

== Education ==
There were two primary schools (in Kernu and in Ruila), a kindergarten (in Haiba) and a children's home (in Haiba) in the municipality.

Kernu primary school was established in 1869 and is situated 39 km from Tallinn. Principal of the school is Ene Rooma (year 2005).

Ruila primary school was established in 1871 and is situated 25 km from Tallinn. The principal of the school is Tiia Roosenberg (as of 2005). Today, the Ruila Basic School has over 120 students.

Haiba kindergarten "Riisikas" is situated in the centre of Haiba village.

The Haiba Children's Home, completed in 1999, is a home for 40 children from Harju County.

== Sight-seeing ==
- Kernu juniper
- Rock of Uku
- Laitse manor house
