= Maarja-Liis Ilus =

Estonian musician

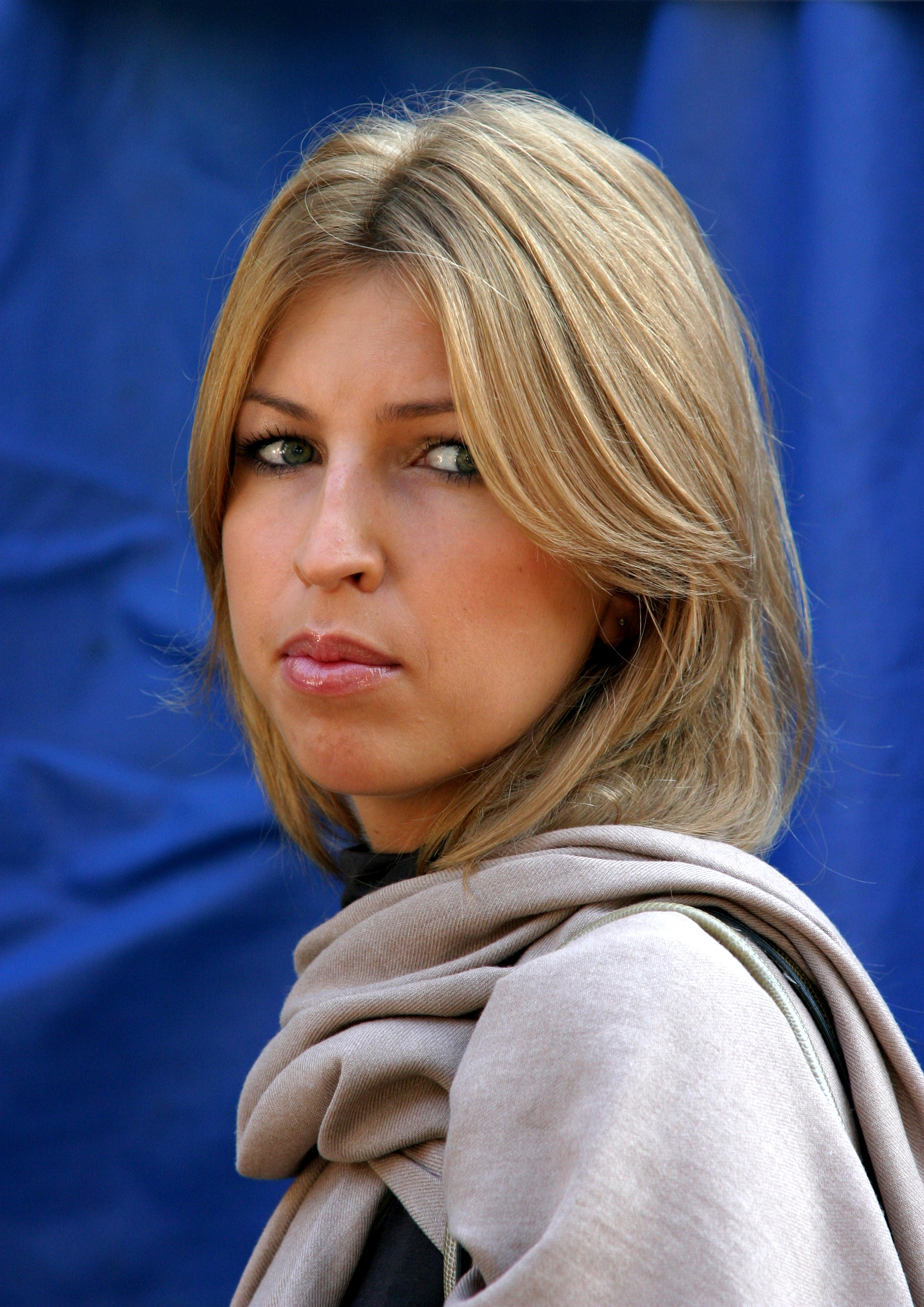
- Maarja-Liis Ilus in support concert "Sing for President Ilves"

Background information
- Born: Maarja-Liis Ilus; 24 December 1980 (age 45); Tallinn, then part of Estonian SSR, Soviet Union
- Genres: Pop
- Years active: 1984–present
- Website: www.maarja.ee

Maarja-Liis Ilus, sometimes better known by her performing name Maarja (born 24 December 1980) is an Estonian pop musician and presenter. She has represented Estonia in the Eurovision Song Contest twice. She was only 15 when she participated in the 1996 contest.

== Discography ==
=== Albums ===
- Maarja-Liis (1996)
- First in Line (1997)
- Kaua veel (1998)
- Heart (1998) (only in Japan)
- City Life (2000)
- Look Around, together with Hinkus (2005)
- Läbi jäätunud klaasi, together with Rein Rannap (2006)
- Homme (2008)
- Jõuluingel (2009)
- Kuldne põld (2012)

=== Important singles ===
- Hold Onto Love (1997)
- First in Line (1998)
- All the Love You Needed (2001)
- He Is Always On My Mind (2003)
- Tulilinnud (2015)
- Nii sind ootan (2015)

== Musical theatre ==
- Miss Saigon, Ellen (2002)
- The Sound of Music, Maria (2003)
- Rent, Maureen Johnson (2004)
- Cats, Grizabella (2005)
- Evita, Eva Perón (2009)

Awards and achievements
| Preceded by Silvi Vrait with "Nagu merelaine" | Estonia in the Eurovision Song Contest (with Ivo Linna); 1996 | Succeeded by Maarja-Liis Ilus with "Keelatud maa" |
| Preceded by Maarja-Liis Ilus & Ivo Linna with "Kaelakee hääl" | Estonia in the Eurovision Song Contest; 1997 | Succeeded by Koit Toome with "Mere lapsed" |
