= Mart Kangur =

Mart Kangur may refer to:

- Mart Kangur (poet)
- Mart Kangur (politician)
