= Kangur (surname) =

Family name

Kangur is an Estonian surname (meaning weaver). Notable people with the name include:

- Guido Kangur (born 1956), Estonian actor
- Jüri-Ruut Kangur (born 1975), Estonian conductor
- Kalju Kangur (1925–1989), Estonian writer and translator
- Kristjan Kangur (born 1982), Estonian basketball player
- Mart Kangur (poet) (born 1971), Estonian poet, translator and philosopher
- Mart Kangur (politician) (1903–1998), Estonian politician
- Villu Kangur (born 1957), Estonian actor and translator

== See also ==
- Kangro (disambiguation)
- Kangru (disambiguation)
