= Hingu =

Village in Estonia

Coordinates: 59°11′N 24°21′E

- Village
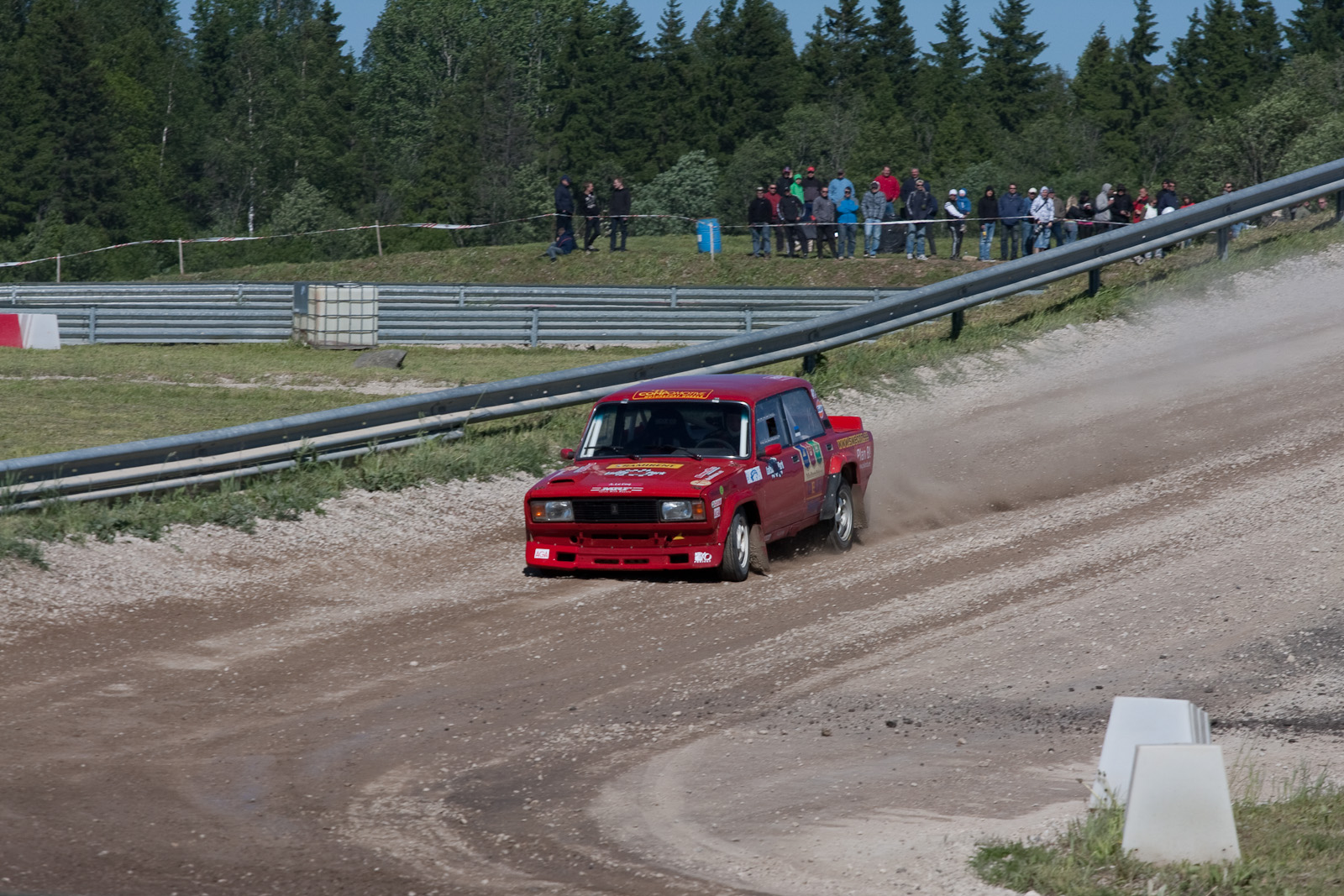
- LaitseRallyPark in Hingu
- Interactive map of Hingu
- Country: Estonia
- County: Harju County
- Parish: Saue Parish
- Time zone: UTC+2 (EET)
  - Summer (DST): UTC+3 (EEST)

Hingu is a village in Saue Parish, Harju County in northern Estonia. Prior to the administrative reform of Estonian local governments in 2017, the village belonged to Kernu Parish.
