= Haiba =

Village in Estonia

Coordinates: 59°08′N 24°28′E

- Village
- Interactive map of Haiba
- Country: Estonia
- County: Harju County
- Parish: Saue Parish
- Time zone: UTC+2 (EET)
  - Summer (DST): UTC+3 (EEST)

Haiba is a village in Harju County, Estonia. Prior to the administrative reform of Estonian local governments in 2017, the village was the administrative centre of Kernu Parish.
