= Pohla, Estonia =

Village in Estonia

Coordinates: 59°10′N 24°22′E

- Village
- Interactive map of Pohla, Estonia
- Country: Estonia
- County: Harju County
- Parish: Saue Parish
- Time zone: UTC+2 (EET)
  - Summer (DST): UTC+3 (EEST)

Pohla, Estonia is a village in Saue Parish, Harju County in northern Estonia. Prior to the administrative reform of Estonian local governments in 2017, the village belonged to Kernu Parish.
