= Kabila, Harju County =

Village in Estonia

Coordinates: 59°13′32″N 24°25′51″E

Kabila
- Village
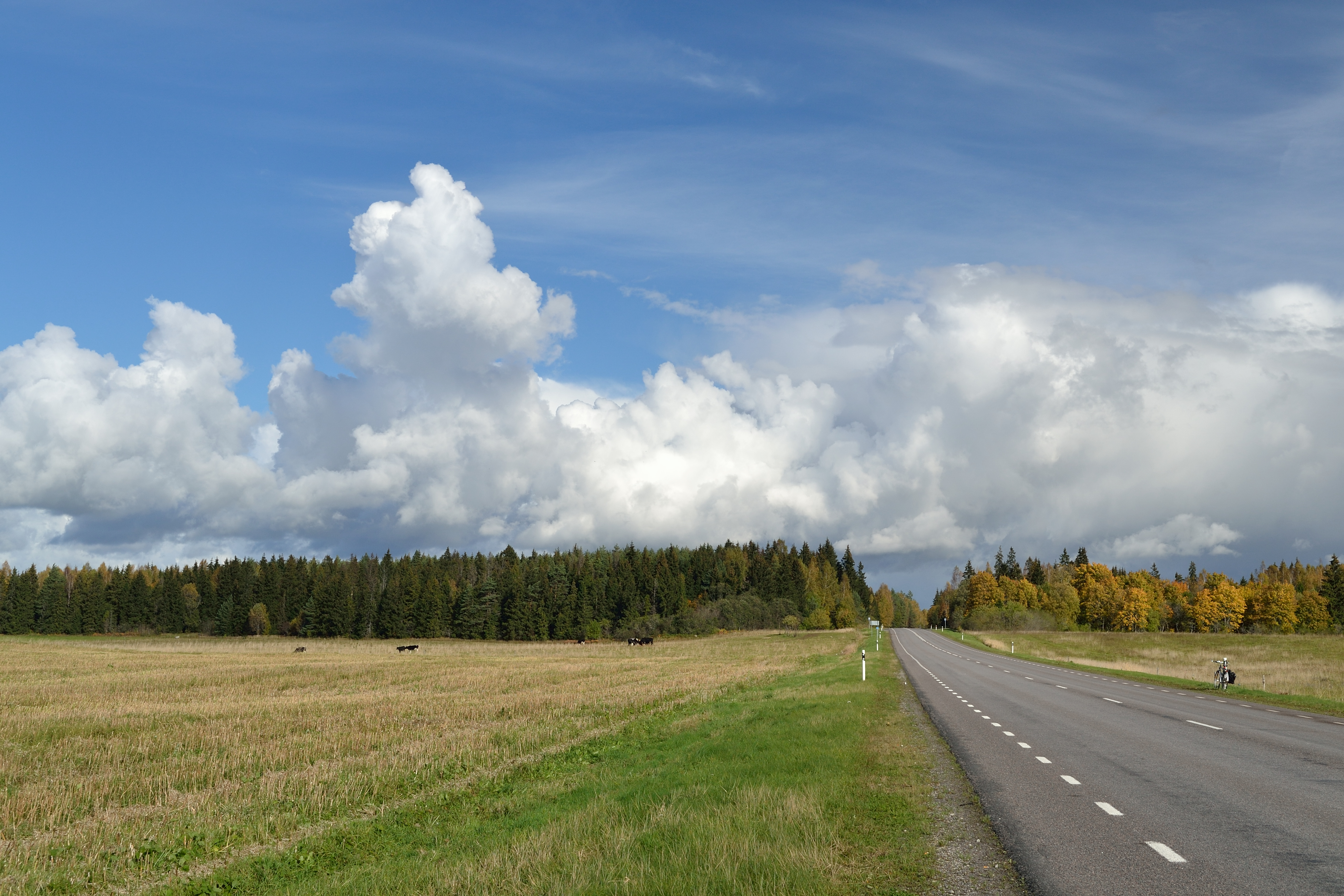
- Ääsmäe-Haapsalu road in Kabila
- Interactive map of Kabila
- Country: Estonia
- County: Harju County
- Parish: Saue Parish
- Time zone: UTC+2 (EET)
  - Summer (DST): UTC+3 (EEST)

Kabila is a village in Saue Parish, Harju County in northern Estonia. Prior to the administrative reform of Estonian local governments in 2017, the village belonged to Kernu Parish.
