= Glacial erratic boulders of Estonia =

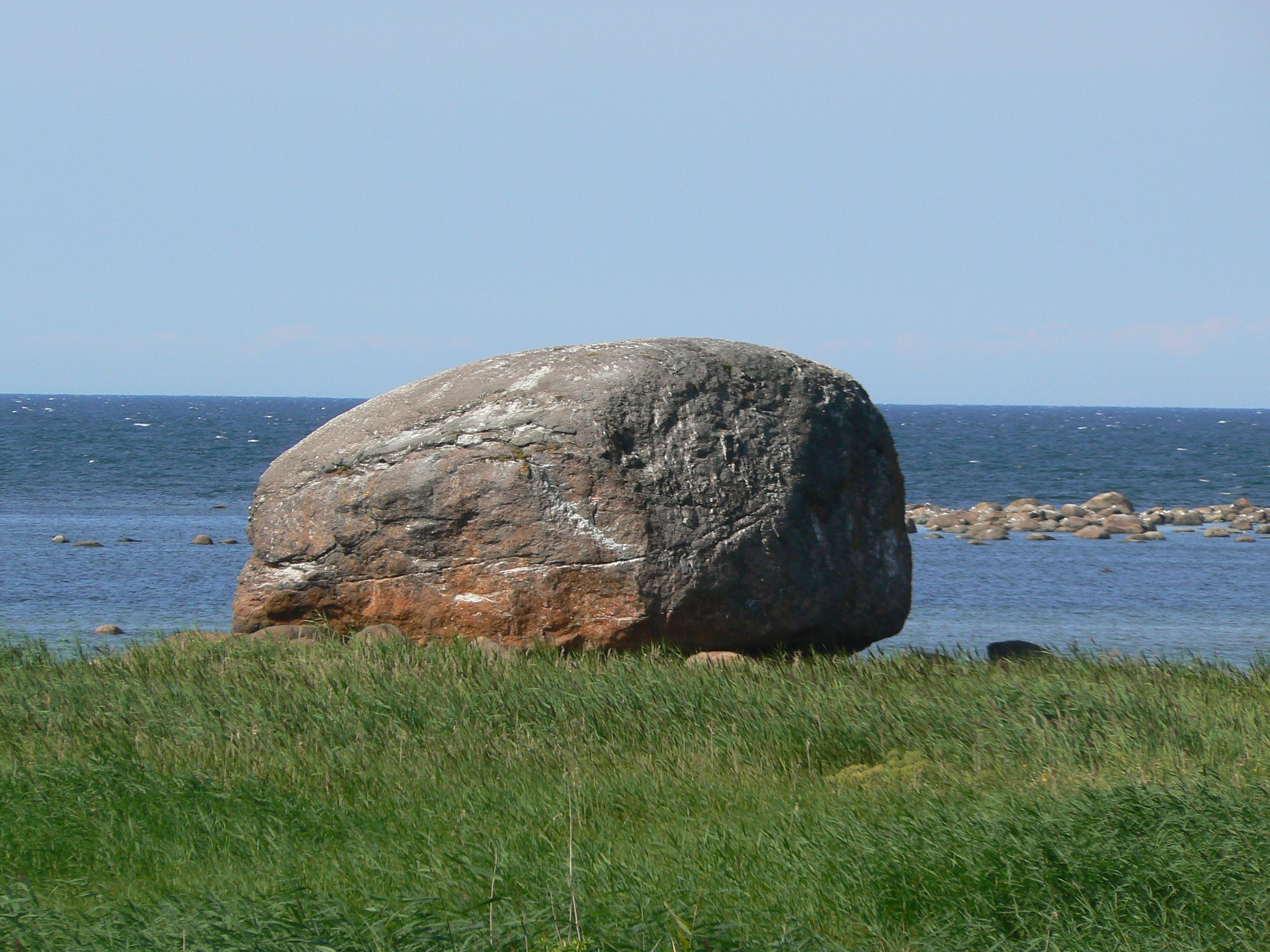
The Letipea boulder (Ehalkivi) in 2009

Glacial erratic boulders of Estonia are large boulders of rock which have been formed and moved into Estonia by glacial action during previous ice ages. They are now registered and protected by the government.

Glacial erratic boulders are found in especially large quantities in Estonia. Most of the boulders greater than 30 metres in circumference found in northern Europe are in Estonia, which has 62 known boulders of this size. Some particular large ones have been found in the sea, including some near Osmussaar that are 100 metres in diameter. The Osmussaar boulders are believed to have been pushed there by glaciers from the Neugrund meteorite crater.

The Estonian boulders were important in the development of the idea that northern Europe was once covered in glaciers. The first to suggest that the boulders were moved by glaciers was Russian mineralogist Vasily Severgin who was led to this conclusion by their similarity to Finnish basement rock at the very early date of 1815. Severgin was later to retract this theory in favour of the drift theory of Charles Lyell who believed they had been carried by icebergs. However, later in the 19th century the glaciation theory slowly gained the ascendancy.

== List of boulders ==
Ehalkivi (Sunset Glow Boulder) near Letipea is the largest erratic boulder in the glaciation area of North Europe. It has a height of 7 m, circumference of 48.2 m, a volume of 930 m^{3} and a mass of approximately 2,500 tonnes. 59.5498°N 26.5876°E
The Kabelikivi is the second largest erratic boulder in Estonia, situated in Muuga, Viimsi Parish. It is 18.7 m long, 14.9 m wide and 6.4 m high, above ground volume is 728 m³.
The Aruküla Rock (Estonian: Aruküla hiidrahn) is a glacial erratic on the field of Aruküla, situated in Harju County, Estonia. It has a circumference of 35.2 m, height of 6.2 m. 59.2140°N 25.4049°E
Assaku Nõiakivi. Located in Assaku
Helgikivi. Situated in Kähu, Tõrva Parish, Valga County.
Helmersen Rock Field. Located in Hiiu Parish
Tubala boulder 58.9602°N 22.7718°E
Rock of Uku. Located in Harju County, Saue Parish, Muusika village
Vaindloo Boulder. Located in Vaindloo

== See also ==
- List of individual rocks
