= Kaelakee hääl =

1996 song by Maarja-Liis Ilus and Ivo Linna

Single by Maarja-Liis Ilus and Ivo Linna
- Language: Estonian
- Released: 1996
- Composer: Priit Pajusaar
- Lyricist: Kaari Sillamaa

Eurovision Song Contest 1996 entry
- Country: Estonia
- Artists: Maarja-Liis Ilus and Ivo Linna
- Language: Estonian
- Composer: Priit Pajusaar
- Lyricist: Kaari Sillamaa
- Conductor: Tarmo Leinatamm

Finals performance
- Final result: 5th
- Final points: 94

Entry chronology
- ◄ "Nagu merelaine" (1994)
- "Keelatud maa" (1997) ►

"Kaelakee hääl" ("Voice of the necklace") is a song performed by Maarja-Liis Ilus and Ivo Linna. The composer was Priit Pajusaar and the lyrics were written by Kaari Sillamaa. It represented Estonia in the Eurovision Song Contest 1996.

In the Estonian preselection Eurolaul, the winner was selected from 13 entries by an international jury. After the voting, "Kaelakee hääl" was tied by points with "Me rõõm ei kao" ("Our happiness won't disappear") by Kadri Hunt, but was declared winner because it had received more top votes of 10 points.

The song was performed eleventh in Eurovision, following Greece's Mariana Efstratiou with "Emis forame to himona anixiatika" and preceding Norway's Elisabeth Andreassen with "I evighet". At the close of voting, it had received 94 points, placing it 5th out of 23.

On stage with Maarja-Liis Ilus and Ivo Linna were instrumentalists Taavo Remmel (bass), Glen Pilvre (keyboards) and Roland Puusepp (drums). Backing vocal was provided by Anne Värvimann.

It was succeeded as Estonian representative at the 1997 contest by Ilus, performing solo, with "Keelatud maa".

The female solo had not been written for Maarja-Liis Ilus in the first place but for another popular singer, Evelin Samuel who had to turn the offer down for an upcoming tour in Japan. Priit Pajusaar then asked Ilus at short notice. She then recorded her parts whilst Evelin Samuel got her tour cancelled shortly after the replacement. The male lead on the other hand had been sung by Ivo Vanem in a demo version but was later replaced by a more experienced Ivo Linna.

Maarja-Liis Ilus' and Ivo Linna's significant age difference initially caused some questions, because the songtext talks about the separation of two lovers. The author, Kaari Sillamaa, therefore wrote alternative lyric, however both Ilus and Linna felt that the original text was better and jointly decided to stick to this. Ilus and Linna did not meet in person until actually performing the song on stage. Even then, during Eurolaul final, Linna was on a tour and Maarja-Liis Ilus had to mime to Ivo Linna on a big screen.

== Translations ==
Two English versions were made of the song, the first "Away from Home", sung by Ilus and Linna, and the second titled "Just a Dream Away", which was recorded by Ilus and Swedish singer Mojje in 1997 for Ilus' album First in Line. Ilus also recorded the latter with Greek singer Yiorgos Doukas (Duke), including a version with some Greek lyrics added in, titled "Pali esena that onirefto" (Πάλι εσένα θα ονειρευτώ).

Cover versions have been made in various languages, including in Finnish and Swedish, and a Spanish version by a group from the United States.
