= Kangur, Afghanistan =

Kangur
- Location in Afghanistan
- Coordinates: 34°58′N 67°54′E
- Country: Afghanistan
- Province: Bamyan Province
- Time zone: + 4.30

Kangur is a village in Bamyan Province in central Afghanistan.

== See also ==
- Kam Piri
- Bamyan Province
