= Leelo Tungal =

Estonian writer

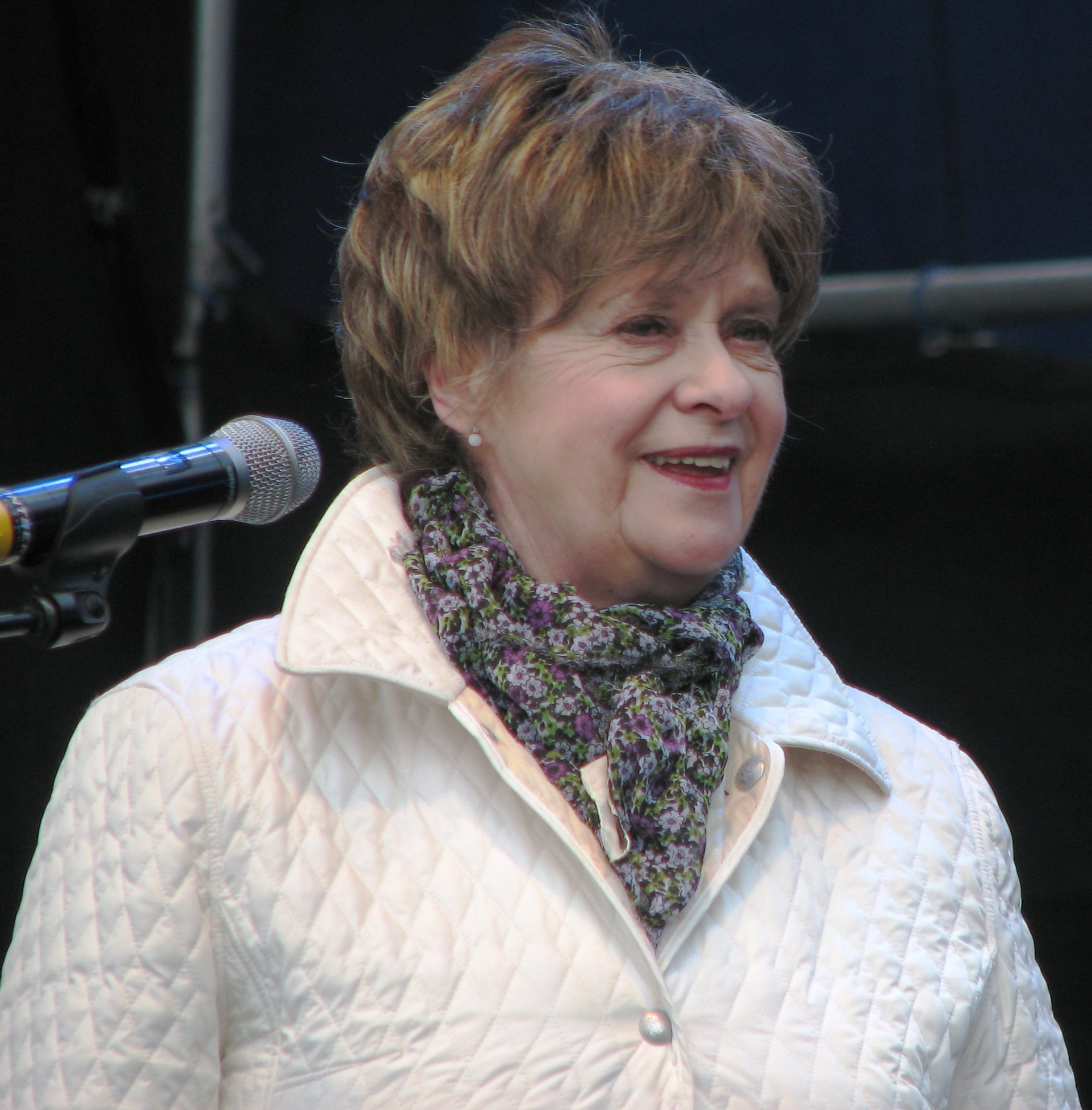
- Born: 22 June 1947 (age 79); Tallinn, then part of Estonian SSR, Soviet Union
- Education: University of Tartu
- Spouse: Raimo Kangro
- Children: Maarja Kangro, Kirke Kangro

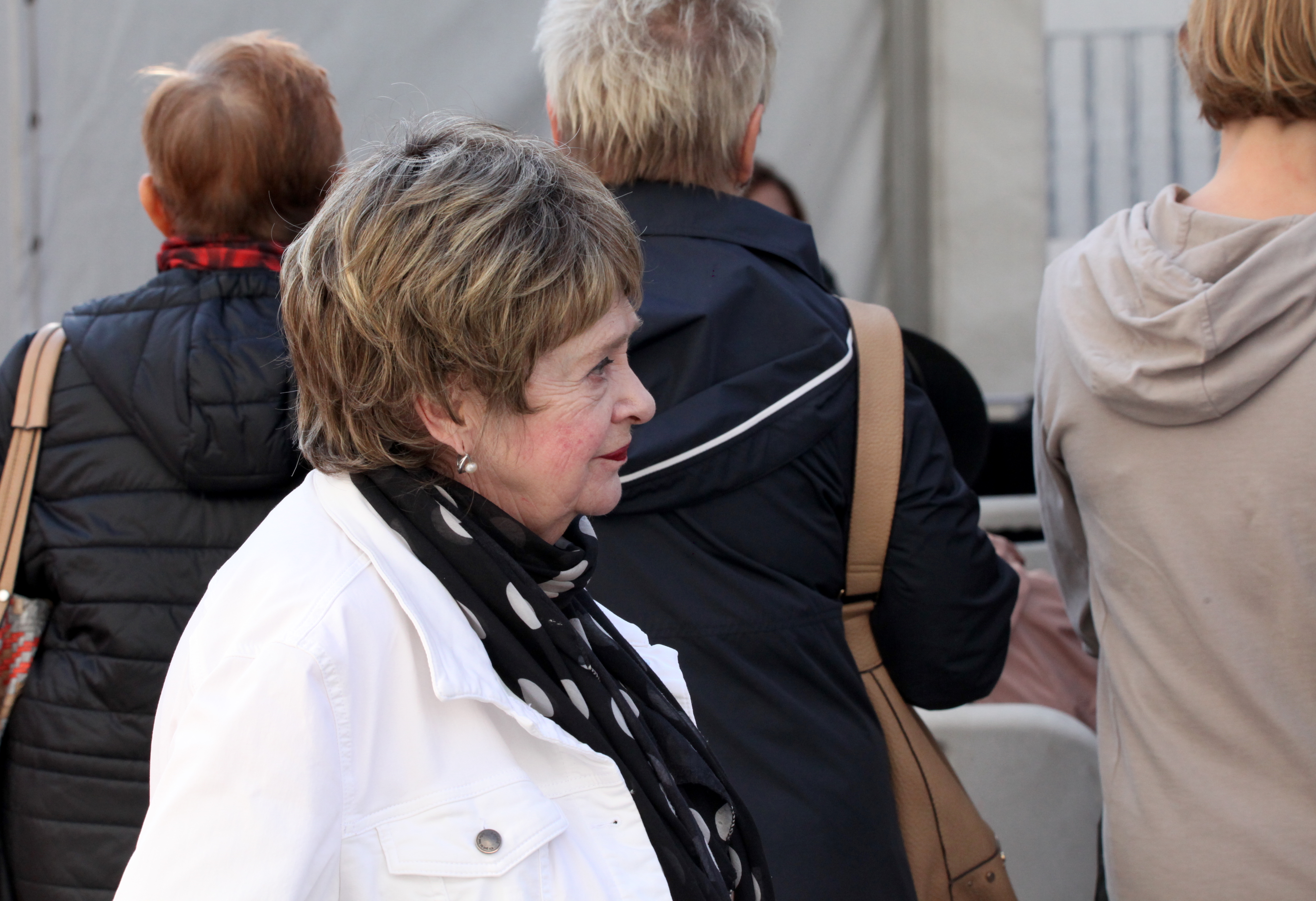
Tungal at the annual Literary Street festival 2021 in Tallinn, Estonia

Leelo Tungal (born 22 June 1947 in Tallinn) is an Estonian poet, children's writer, translator, editor and librettist.

== Life and career ==
Tungal studied Estonian literature at the University of Tartu. After her graduation, she has worked as a teacher, editor, drama and literature consultant for the Estonian Puppet Theatre, and as a freelance writer. In 1994, she founded the children's magazine Hea Laps, and worked as its editor-in-chief until January 2019. She has published over 80 books of prose and poetry for children and young adults, has written several libretti for Estonian composers, and has translated children's poetry and plays from Bulgarian, English, Finnish, Russian, and several other languages.

In 1994, "Nagu merelaine" of her lyric represented Estonia in the Eurovision Song Contest 1994.

== Personal ==
Leelo Tungal was married to composer Raimo Kangro; their children are writer Maarja Kangro, artist Kirke Kangro and cultural critic Anna-Magdaleena Kangro.

== Poetry (a selection) ==
- 1966 Kummaliselt kiivitajad kurtsid (Peewits weirdly complained)
- 1974 Õitsev kuristik (Blooming chasm)
- 1979 Veni, vidi, vidiit...
- 1979 Raamat ja kask (A book and a birch tree)
- 1981 Mullaketraja (Soil spinner)
- 1982 Tedre mäng (Grouse game)
- 1986 Valguse aine (The substance of light)
- 1993 Ei nime, ei hinda (No name, no price)
- 1994 Ainus kangelastegu on naeratus (The only heroic deed is a smile)
- 2002 Käsi on valge, süsi on must (Hand is white, charcoal is black)
- 2007 Täisminevik (Past perfect)

== Children's poetry (a selection) ==
- 1976 Koera elu (A dog´s life)
- 1978 Hundi lugemine (Reading Wolf)
- 1982 Väike ranits (Little satchel)
- 1983 Seltsis on segasem
- 1983 Tondu (Curious dog Tondu)
- 1985 Tere-tere (Hello-Hello!)
- 1988 Vana vahva lasteaed (Old spunk kindergarten)
- 1991 Ema abilised (Mother´s helpers)
- 1992 Aastaring (Round of the year)
- 1993 Põrsas Pamp (Piggy Pamp)
- 1994 Põrsapõli
- 2000 Marjajuur lume all (Berry root beneath the snow)
- 2001 Kirjad jõuluvanale (Letters to Santa Claus)
- 2004 Lepatriinu faksiga (Ladybug with fax)
- 2006 Lätikeelne jäätis (Latvian ice cream)
- 2009 Loomabeebits

== Fiction (a selection) ==
- 1978 Ilus vana naine (Pretty old Lady) [short stories]
- 1980 Neitsi Maarja neli päeva (The Virgin Mary´s Four Days) [novel for young people]
- 2008 Seltsimees Laps ja suured inimesed (Comrade Kid and the Grown-Ups) [an autobiographical novel]
- 2009 Samet ja saepuru (Velvet and Sawdust) [novel, a sequel for Comrade Kid and the Grown-Ups]
- 2018 Naisekäe puudutus ehk Seltsimees laps ja isa (A Woman´s Touch, a.k.a. Comrade Kid and Dad) [novel, a sequel for Velvet and Sawdust]

== Fiction for children (a selection) ==
- 1983 Pool koera (Half a dog)
- 1986 Kartul, lehm ja kosmonaut (Potato, cow and a cosmonaut)
- 1986 Kirju liblika suvi (Colorful Butterfly Summer)
- 1989 Pille, Madis ja teised (Pille, Madis and others)
- 1989 Kristiina, see keskmine (Kristiina, the Middle One)
- 1991 Barbara ja suvekoerad (Barbara and the Summer Dogs)
- 1993 Vampiir ja pioneer (Vampire and pioneer)
- 1994 Barbara ja sügiskoerad (Barbara and the Autumn Dogs)
- 1997 Kollitame, kummitame (We spook, we haunt)
- 2010 Jõuluvana, kes kartis lapsi (The Santa Claus Who Was Afraid of Kids)
- 2013 Porgand töötab porgandina (Carrot Works as a Carrot)
- 2014 Vanaema on meil nõid (Our Grandma is a Witch)
- 2014 Puudel Pedro ja igatsustasu (Pedro the Poodle and the Apology Gift)
- 2015 Jänesepoeg otsib sõpra (Joseph the Bunny Looks for a Friend)
- 2016 Lumemees Ludvigi õnn (Ludwig the Snowman´s Lucky Day)
- 2017 Halloo! (Hallo!)
- 2017 Delfiin Delila suur sõber (Delilah the Dolphin´s Whale of a Friend)
- 2018 Saba (Tail)
- 2018 Päkapikud askeldavad (The Elves on fuss)

== Translations ==
Selected translations

Barbara and the Summer Dogs

- Russian: Барбара и летние собаки, Издательство КПД 2012

Barbara and the Autumn Dogs

- Russian: Барбара и осенние собаки, Издательство КПД 2012

Bundle the Piglet

- Finnish: Porsas Pamp, Monokkel 1993

Comrade Kid and the Grown-Ups

- Latvian: Biedrs bērns un lielie cilvēki, Liels un mazs 2018
- Lithuanian: Draugė mergaitė ir suaugė žmonės, Gimtasis žodis 2013
- Russian: Toварищ рeбенок и взрослыe люди, Издательство КПД 2010

Felix the Hedgehog series

- Russian: Ёжик Феликс, Издательство КПД 2014

A Half of a Dog

- Russian: Половина собаки, Детская литература 1991

Hello-Hello

- Russian: В один прекрасный грустный день, Детская литература 1991

Juku, Kalle and Klabautermann in Tallinn

- Finnish: Juku, Kalle ja laivanhaltia Tallinnassa, Huma 2002

Kristiina, the Middle One

- Russian: Kристийна, или легко ли быть средней сестрой, Издательство КПД 2009
- Finnish: Kristiina, se keskimmäinen, Tallinn: Avita 1994

Ludwig the Snowman´s Lucky Day

- Latvian: Sniegavīra Ludviga laime, Jāņa Rozes apgāds 2018
- German: Schneemann Ludwigs größtes Glück, Kullerkupp Kinderbuch Verlag 2017

The More the Merrier

- Russian: Куча мала, Eesti Raamat 1984

Potatoes, Cows and Cosmonauts

- English: Perioodika 1991

Tales of Miriam

- Russian: Истории Мириам, Nukufilm; Eesti Päevaleht 2009

The Tilk Family Goes to the Song Festival

- Russian: Пошли смешинки на Певческий праздник, Menu Kirjastus 2011

Velvet and Sawdust

- Russian: Бархат и опилки или Товарищ ребёнок и буквы, Издательство КПД 2012

The Virgin Mary´s Four Days

- Russian: Четыре дня Маарьи, Детская литература 1986

== Awards ==
- 1995 Karl Eduard Sööt Award for children's literature (Happy Birthday!)
- 1997 Annual Children's Literature Award of the Cultural Endowment of Estonia (We Spook! We Haunt!)
- 1999 Julius Oro Award for children's literature
- 2000 Karl Eduard Sööt Award for children's literature (It Sure is Good!)
- 2007 Karl Eduard Sööt Award for children's literature (Latvian Ice Cream)
- 2007 Muhv Award for promoting children's literature
- 2008 Harjumaa Kultuuripärl (The Culture Pearl of Harjumaa)
- 2010 IBBY Honour List (Comrade Kid and the Grown-Ups)
- 2010–2014, 2017, 2019 Astrid Lindgren Memorial Award candidate
- 2013 Good Children's Book (Carrot Works as a Carrot)
- 2014 The Merit Award “With Children and For Children” of the Ombudsman for Children, for the lifetime achievement
- 2015 Ferdinand Johann Wiedemann Language Prize
- 2016 Good Children's book (Ludwig the Snowman's Lucky Day)
- 2017 Annual Children's Literature Award of the Cultural Endowment of Estonia (Hallo!)
- 2018 National Lifetime Achievement Award for Culture
- 2018 Hans Christian Andersen Award nominee
- 2019 Viru County Literary Award (trilogy “Comrade Kid”)
- 2019 Baltic Assembly Prize in Literature
