= Ivo Linna =

Estonian singer (born 1949)

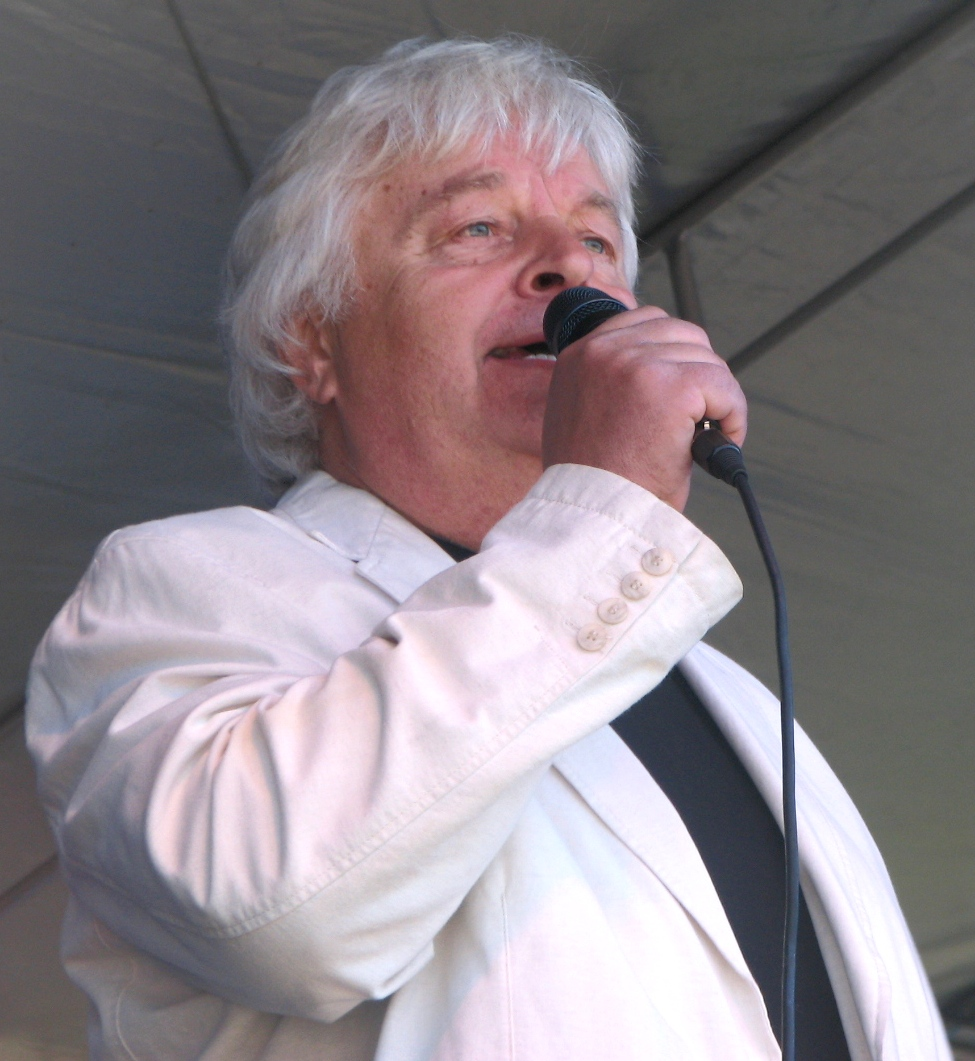
- Linna performing in 2011

Background information
- Born: 12 June 1949 (age 77)
- Origin: Kuressaare, then part of Estonian SSR, Soviet Union
- Occupation: Singer
- Instruments: vocals, guitar

Ivo Linna (born 12 June 1949 in Kuressaare) is an Estonian singer.

== Eurovision Song Contest and Eesti Laul ==
He represented Estonia alongside Maarja Liis Ilus in the Eurovision Song Contest 1996 in Oslo with the song "Kaelakee Hääl" (The Sound of a Necklace) which finished 5th at the contest.

He competed in Eesti Laul 2017 with the song "Suur Loterii" (Big Lottery). The song won its semi final, but came fifth of ten entries in the final round.

Together with his son Robert Linna and the Estonian band Supernova, Ivo participated in Eesti Laul 2021 with the song "Ma Olen Siin" (I'm Here). The song finished in eleventh place of the twelve entries in the final round.

== Personal life ==
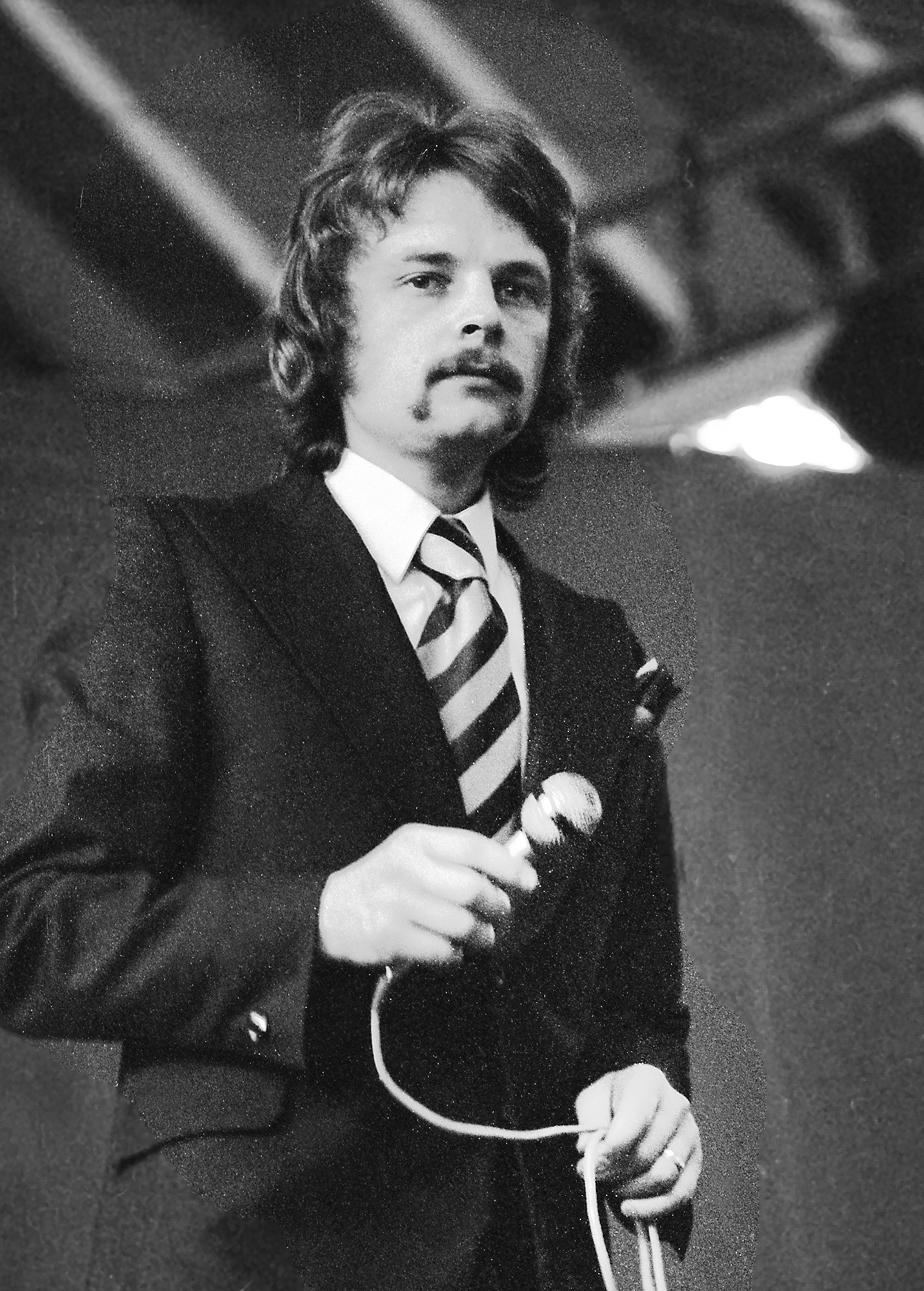
Linna performing in 1974

Linna was married to Reet Linna, and he is the father of singer Robert Linna.

In 2000, the President of Estonia decorated Linna with a IV Class Order of the White Star.

== Discography ==
Solo Albums

- Ivo Linna '93 (1993)
- Iff 1 (1998)
- Enne ja pärast päeva (2001)
- Üksi, iseendas üksi... (2006)

In addition to the albums mentioned above, Ivo Linna has released more albums with different rock acts of Estonia, like Apelsin and Rock Hotel.

Awards and achievements
Preceded by Silvi Vrait with "Nagu merelaine"	Estonia in the Eurovision Song Contest (with Maarja-Liis Ilus); 1996	Succeeded by Maarja-Liis Ilus with "Keelatud maa"
