= Laitse =

Village in Estonia

- Village
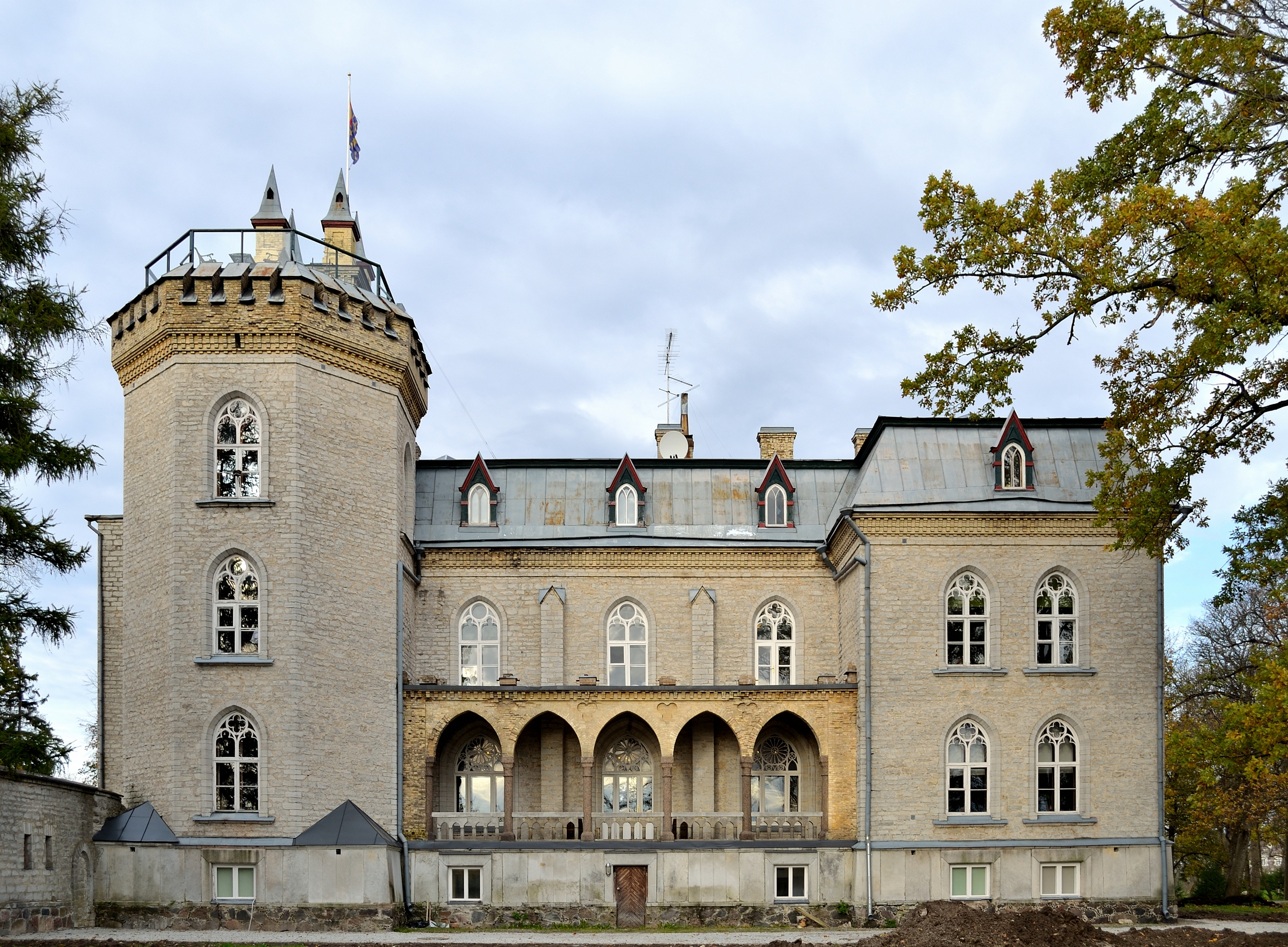
- Laitse Manor

- Location in Estonia
- Coordinates: 59°12′N 24°23′E
- Country: Estonia
- County: Harju County
- Parish: Saue Parish
- Time zone: UTC+2 (EET)
  - Summer (DST): UTC+3 (EEST)

Laitse is a village in Saue Parish, Harju County in northern Estonia. Prior to the administrative reform of Estonian local governments in 2017, the village belonged to Kernu Parish.

== Laitse manor ==
Laitse Manor (German: Laitz) was established as an independent manorial estate in 1630. During its history, it has belonged to several Baltic German families belonging to the nobility, including the Uexküll family. During the Soviet occupation of Estonia it was divided into apartments. The presently visible building was erected by Woldemar von Uexküll in 1890-1892 in local limestone and is among the best preserved Gothic Revival manor houses in Estonia.

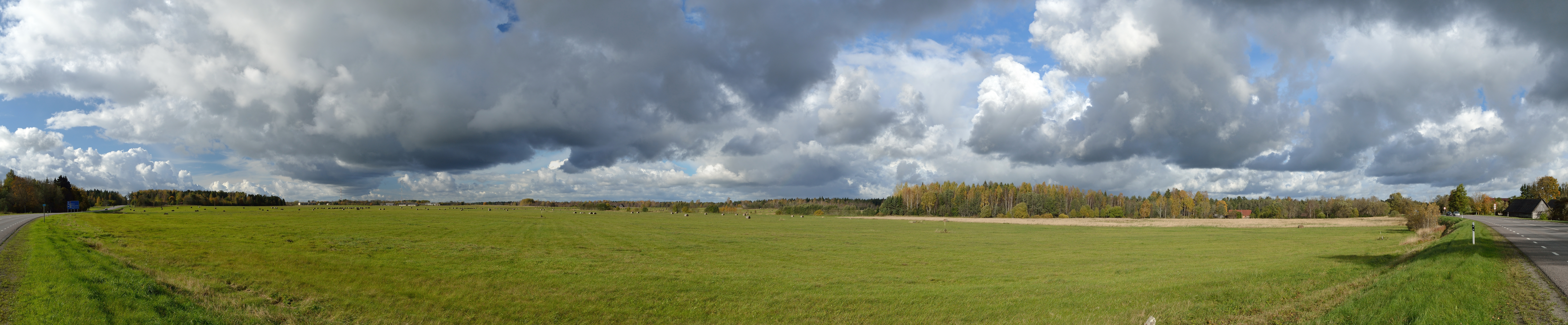
Meadow in Laitse village.
