= Kare Kauks =

Estonian singer and music teacher

Kare Kauks (Kare Orav by marriage; born 2 June 1961 in Kehra) is an Estonian singer and music teacher.

== Career ==
Kare Kauks has been vocal-coached by Heidy Tamme at the pop department of Tallinn Music School. As a promising jazz vocalist, she participated in several jazz festivals in early 1980s, including the one in Tbilisi.

In 1986, Kare Kauks became the soloist of the extremely popular Estonian rock band Mahavok. In spring 1987, Mahavok won the grand prix both on Tartu Pop Music Festival, and on Jūrmala festival in Latvia with the song "Mägede hääl" ("Voice of the Mountains") which brought the group attention throughout the Soviet Union. The record company Melodia released an album by Mahavok, which sold well across the USSR.

During the 1990s, Kare Kauks was rarely seen on stage for devoting herself to family instead. In 2001, however, she played the role of Fantine in the Estonian production of the musical Les Misérables in Tallinn.

In 2002, Mahavok released a double compilation album of greatest hits for the band's twentieth anniversary and performed some concerts. They reunited again a few years later, when the founder and leader of the group, Heini Vaikmaa, celebrated his 50th birthday, and Mahavok has continued performing since then.

== Personal life ==
Kare Kauks is married to the diplomat and lawyer Indrek Orav; they have two daughters and live in Tallinn.
