= Raimo Kangro =

Estonian composer (1949–2001)

- Born: 21 September 1949; Tartu, then occupied part of Estonian SSR, Soviet Union
- Died: 4 February 2001 (aged 51); Ruila, Harju County, Estonia
- Resting place: Tallinn Forest Cemetery
- Occupations: Composer; Educator
- Notable work: Põhjaneitsi
- Spouse: Leelo Tungal
- Children: Maarja Kangro, Kirke Kangro, Anna-Magdaleena Kangro

Raimo Kangro (21 September 1949 – 4 February 2001) was an Estonian composer best known for his instrumental works and operas.

== Biography ==
Raimo Kangro was born on 21 September 1949 in Tartu. In 1968, he graduated in composition from the Tallinn State Conservatory (now the Estonian Academy of Music and Theatre).

From 1989 until his death in 2001, Kangro taught composition at the Estonian Academy of Music and Theatre. Between 1993 and 2000, he served as the director of the Estonian Music Foundation. He became a member of the Estonian Composers' Union in 1973. His work in teaching and music administration formed part of broader involvement in Estonia's contemporary music community.

He died on 4 February 2001 in Ruila, Harju County, and was buried at Tallinn Forest Cemetery (Metsakalmistu).

== Personal life ==
Kangro was married to Estonian poet and author Leelo Tungal. They had three daughters: artist Kirke Kangro, writer Maarja Kangro, and Anna-Magdaleena Kangro.

== Works ==
- 1980 – Põhjaneitsi (The Maiden of the North), rock opera
