= Metsanurga, Saue Parish =

Village in Estonia

Coordinates: 59°10′39″N 24°30′44″E

Metsanurga
- Village
- Interactive map of Metsanurga
- Country: Estonia
- County: Harju County
- Parish: Saue Parish
- Time zone: UTC+2 (EET)
  - Summer (DST): UTC+3 (EEST)

Metsanurga is a village in Saue Parish, Harju County in northern Estonia. Prior to the administrative reform of Estonian local governments in 2017, the village belonged to Kernu Parish.
