= Toomas Vanem =

Estonian guitarist and composer (born 1965)

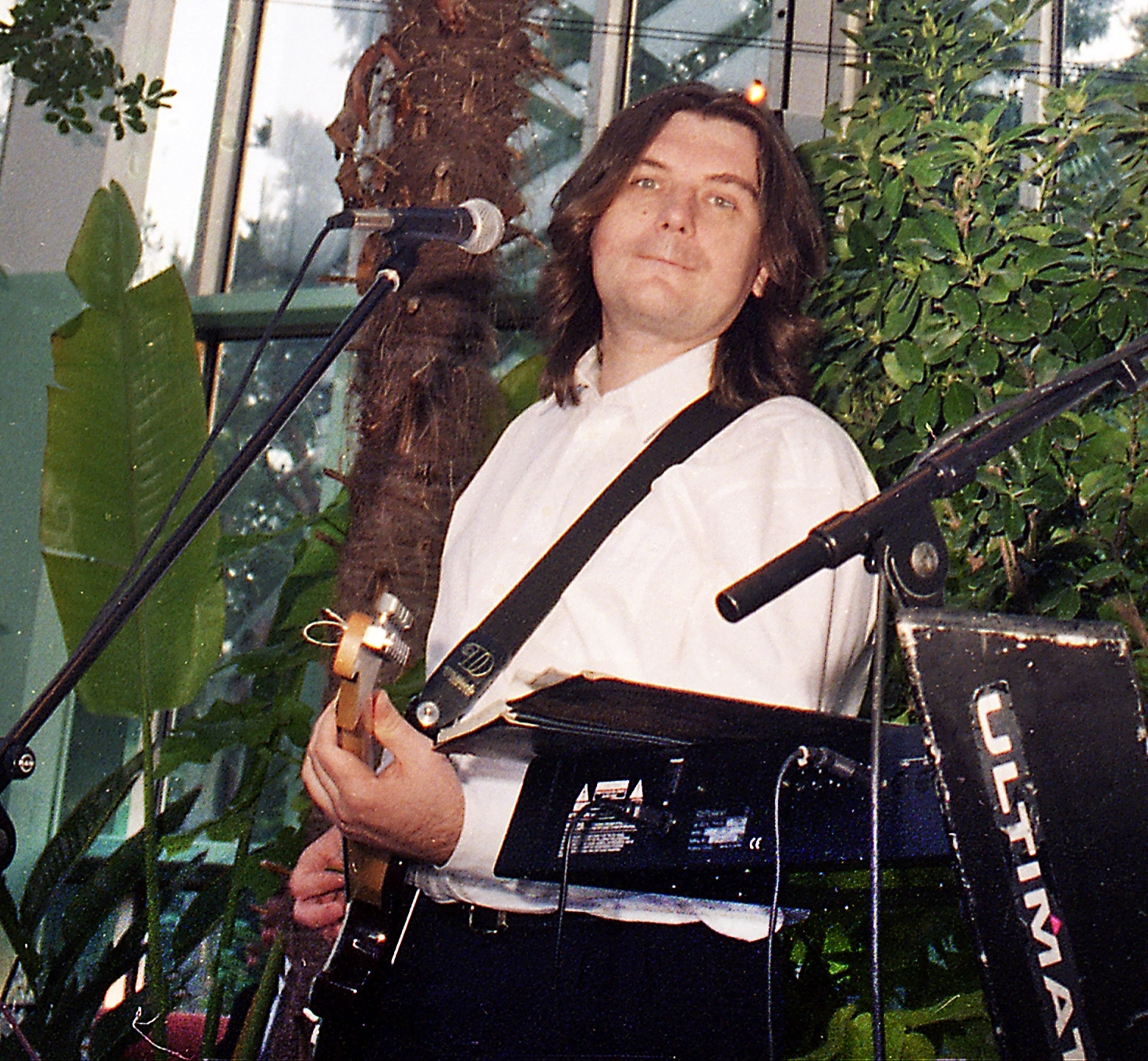

Background information
- Born: Toomas Vanem; 8 June 1965 (age 60); Rapla, then part of Estonian SSR, Soviet Union
- Genres: Jazz, Progressive rock, Rock
- Instrument: Guitar
- Years active: 1980s–present
- Formerly of: Radar; Dialog; Linnu Tee; Shower
- Website: toomasvanem.com

Toomas Vanem (born 8 June 1965) is an Estonian guitarist and composer. He started his music career in the 1980s. He has played in multiple Estonian rock bands such as Radar, Kontakt, Linnu Tee, Shower etc. In 1987-1991 Vanem played guitar for Russian rock group Dialog. In 1995, Toomas Vanem together with his brother Ivo Vanem, composed the music for the film ’’Ma olen väsinud vihkamast’’(’’Too Tired to Hate’’). In 2014 Toomas Vanem released his first solo album I. American bass legend Stu Hamm also appears on a track here.

== Discography ==
- I (2014, CD) Toomas Vanem productions

== Videos ==
- Toomas Vanem "Ghost Story" on YouTube
