= Urmas Lattikas =

Estonian composer and jazz pianist

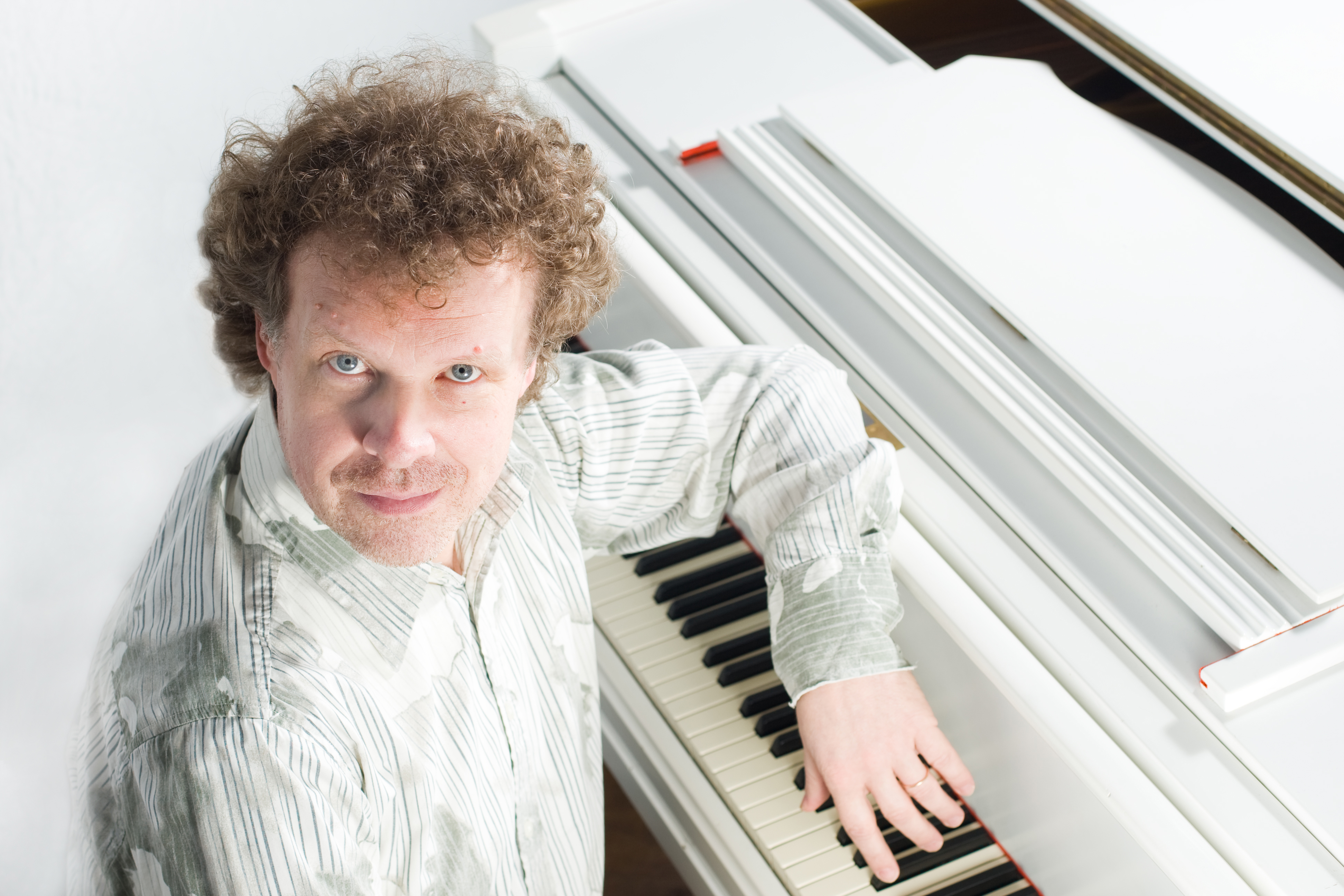
Urmas Lattikas

Urmas Lattikas (born 17 August 1960 in Tapa) is an Estonian composer and jazz pianist.

In 1986, he graduated from Tallinn State Conservatory in composition speciality. He completed his postgraduate studies (jazz composition, piano) at the Berklee College of Music in Boston, graduating in 1990. After returning to Estonia, Ummi founded his own jazz quintet, with which he took part in the Jazzkaar 91 festival and in 1992 released the album, Freedom To Love Freedom To Lose. He increasingly worked as an arranger in the fields of pop, jazz and classical music. In 1994 he led the orchestra for the Estonian entry to the Eurovision Song Contest. He wrote the scores for films (Nõid, 1988), and compositions for choir, orchestra and chamber music. Under his own name, he released several albums

Since 1982, he has been a leading figure of the jazz quintet named Urmas Lattikas Ensemble.

Since 2000, he has been a member of Estonian Composers' Union.

== Works ==
- youth musical "Towards the Stars" ('Tähtede poole')
- youth musical "Thumbelina" ('Pöial-Liisi')
