= Kangru (disambiguation) =

Kangru is a small borough in Kiili Parish, Harju County, Estonia.

Kangru may also refer to:

- Kangru, Pärnu County, a village in Halinga Parish, Pärnu County, Estonia
- Kangru, Rapla County, a village in Märjamaa Parish, Rapla County, Estonia

== See also ==
- Kangur (disambiguation)
- Kangro (disambiguation)
