= Kangro (village) =

Village in Tibet, China

Coordinates: 33°06′N 85°36′E

Kangro is a village in the Tibet Autonomous Region of China.

== See also ==
- List of towns and villages in Tibet
