= Kernu =

Village in Estonia

- Village
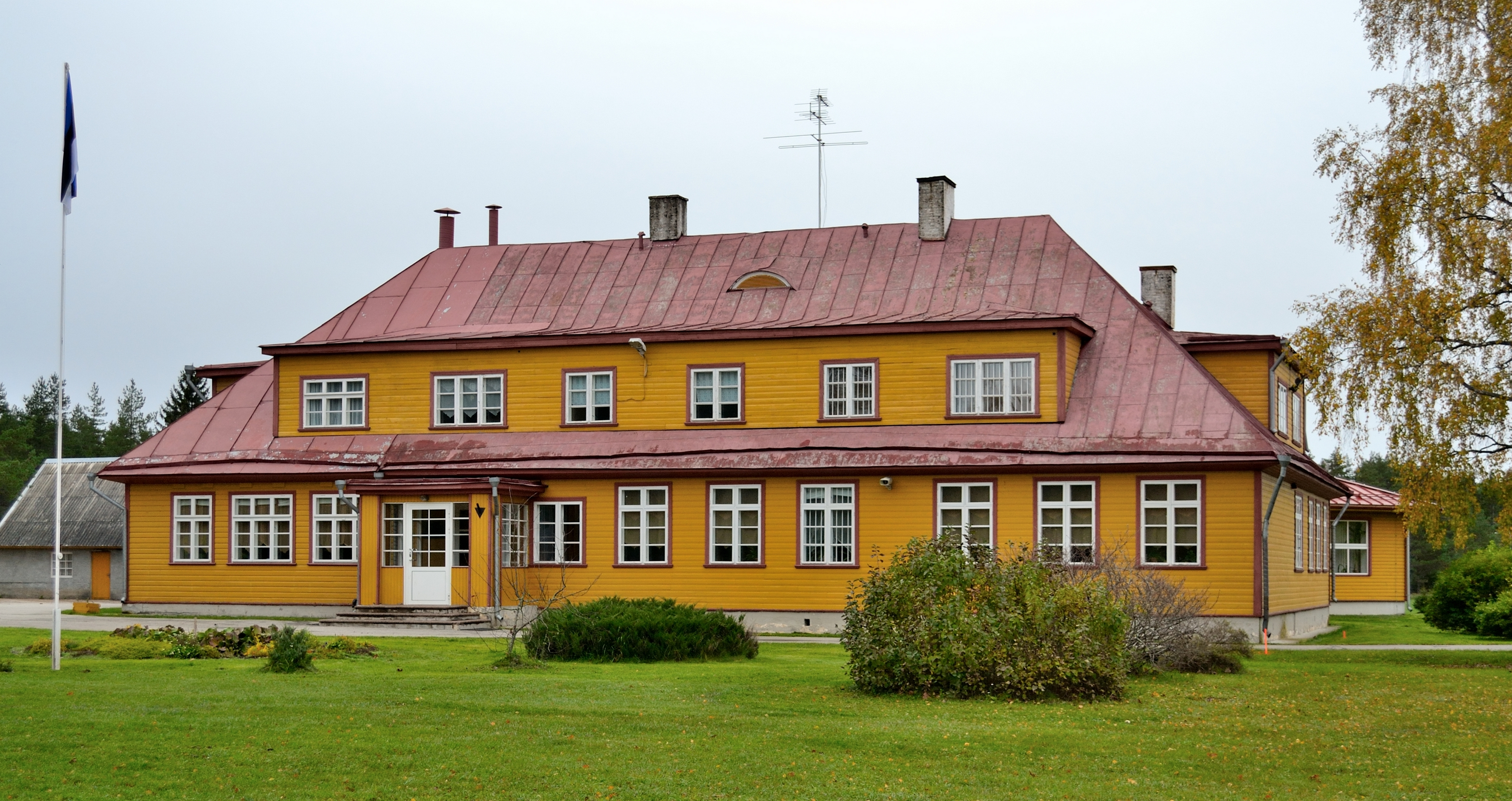
- Kernu Primary School

- Location in Estonia
- Coordinates: 59°08′N 24°30′E
- Country: Estonia
- County: Harju County
- Parish: Saue Parish
- Time zone: UTC+2 (EET)
  - Summer (DST): UTC+3 (EEST)

Kernu is a village in Saue Parish, Harju County in northern Estonia. It is located in the southwestern part of Harju County and is a neighbour to Saue, Keila, Vasalemma and Nissi Parish in Harju County and Kohila, Rapla and Märjamaa parish in Rapla County.

Before the administrative reform in 2017, the village was in Kernu Parish.

Kernu manor lies in neighbouring Kohatu village.
