= Kam Piri =

- Location in Afghanistan
- Coordinates: 34°41′N 68°0′E
- Country: Afghanistan
- Province: Bamyan Province
- Time zone: + 4.30

Kam Piri (Kam Pīrī in the Afghan language) is a village in Bamyan Province in central Afghanistan.

== See also ==
- Bamyan Province
