= Maarja Kangro =

Estonian writer

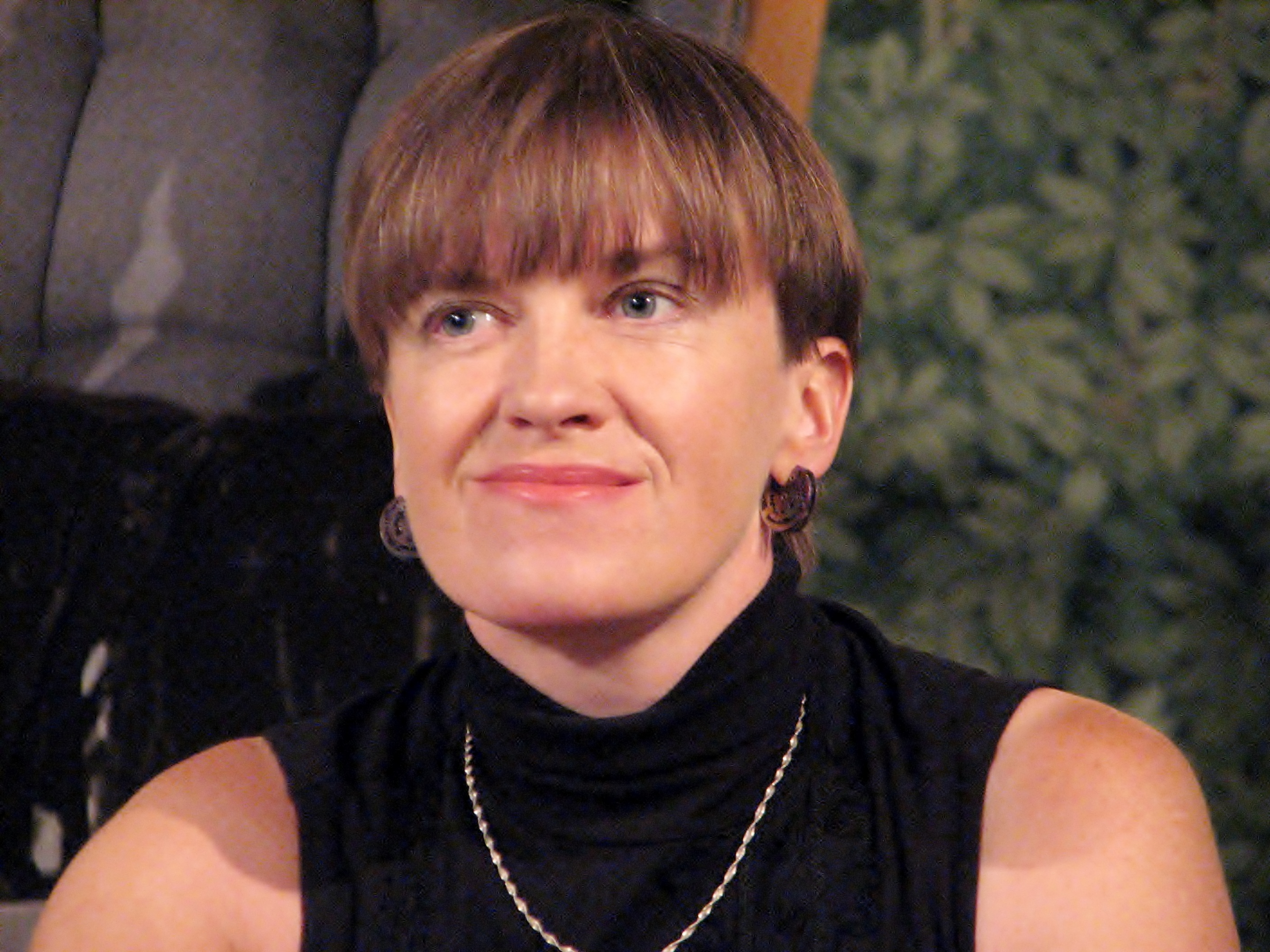
- Born: 20 December 1973 (age 52) Tallinn, then part of Estonian SSR, Soviet Union
- Education: University of Tartu

Maarja Kangro (born 20 December 1973 in Tallinn) is an Estonian poet, short story writer, novelist, essayist, nonfiction writer and librettist.

== Life ==
She is the daughter of composer Raimo Kangro and author Leelo Tungal. She studied English at the University of Tartu and is currently a PhD student in cultural studies at the University of Tallinn. She has written several libretti for Estonian composers and has translated from Italian, English, German, and other languages (among others Giacomo Leopardi, Andrea Zanzotto, Valerio Magrelli, Giorgio Agamben, Hans Magnus Enzensberger).

== Selected works ==
=== Books ===
- 2006 Kurat õrnal lumel (poems)
- 2006 Puuviljadraakon (children's book)
- 2007 Tule mu koopasse, mateeria (poems)
- 2008 Heureka (poems)
- 2010 Ahvid ja solidaarsus (short stories)
- 2010 Kunstiteadlase jõulupuu (poems)
- 2012 Dantelik auk (short stories)
- 2013 Must tomat (poems)
- 2014 Hüppa tulle (short stories and a novella)
- 2016 Klaaslaps (novel)
- 2018 Minu auhinnad (nonfiction)
- 2019 Tuul (poetry)
- 2019 Varietee (selected poetry translations)
- 2020 Kaks pead (collection of libretti with an afterword)
- 2020 Isa kõrvad (stories for children)

=== Books in translation ===
- 2011 La farfalla dell'irreversibilità (poems in Italian)
- 2012 Обезьяны и солидарность (short stories in Russian)
- 2013 Чёрный помидор (poetry in Russian)
- 2018 Stikla bērns (novel in Latvian)
- 2018 Kind aus Glas (novel in German)
- 2019 Фруктовый дракон (children's book in Russian)
- 2020 Stiklo vaikas (novel in Lithuanian)

=== Libretti and other texts for music ===
- 1999 Süda, an opera by Raimo Kangro (with Kirke Kangro)
- 2005 Kaubamaja, an opera by Tõnis Kaumann
- 2006 Tuleaed and Mu luiged, mu mõtted, operas by Tõnu Kõrvits
- 2007 To Define Happiness, a multimedia work by Gavin Bryars and Peeter Jalakas
- 2008 Monument Muneja-Kukele ehk Kuked ja kanad, a cantata by Timo Steiner
- 2009 Tartumaa täditütar, an opera by Tõnis Kaumann
- 2011 Kaks pead, an opera by Timo Steiner

== Awards ==
- 2006 Estonian Children's Literature Centre's Best Book of the Year Award (for Puuviljadraakon)
- 2008 Tallinn University Literary Award (for Tule mu koopasse, mateeria)
- 2009 Tallinn University Literary Award (for Heureka)
- 2009 Estonian Cultural Endowment's Literary Award for poetry et:Kultuurkapitali kirjanduse sihtkapitali aastapreemia (for Heureka)
- 2011 Estonian Cultural Endowment's Literary Award for prose et:Kultuurkapitali kirjanduse sihtkapitali aastapreemia (for Ahvid ja solidaarsus)
- 2011 Friedebert Tuglas Short Story Award (for 48 tundi)
- 2014 Friedebert Tuglas Short Story Award (for Atropose Opel Meriva)
- 2016 Tallinn University Literary Award for translation (Hans Magnus Enzensberger's "Der Untergang der Titanic")
- 2016 Erster Rödermarkscher Literaturpreis (for the poem "Der Ex" / "Vana armuke")
- 2020 Tallinn University Literary Award for Poetry and Translation (for "Tuul" and "Varietee")
