= Heini Vaikmaa =

Estonian musician and composer (born 1958)

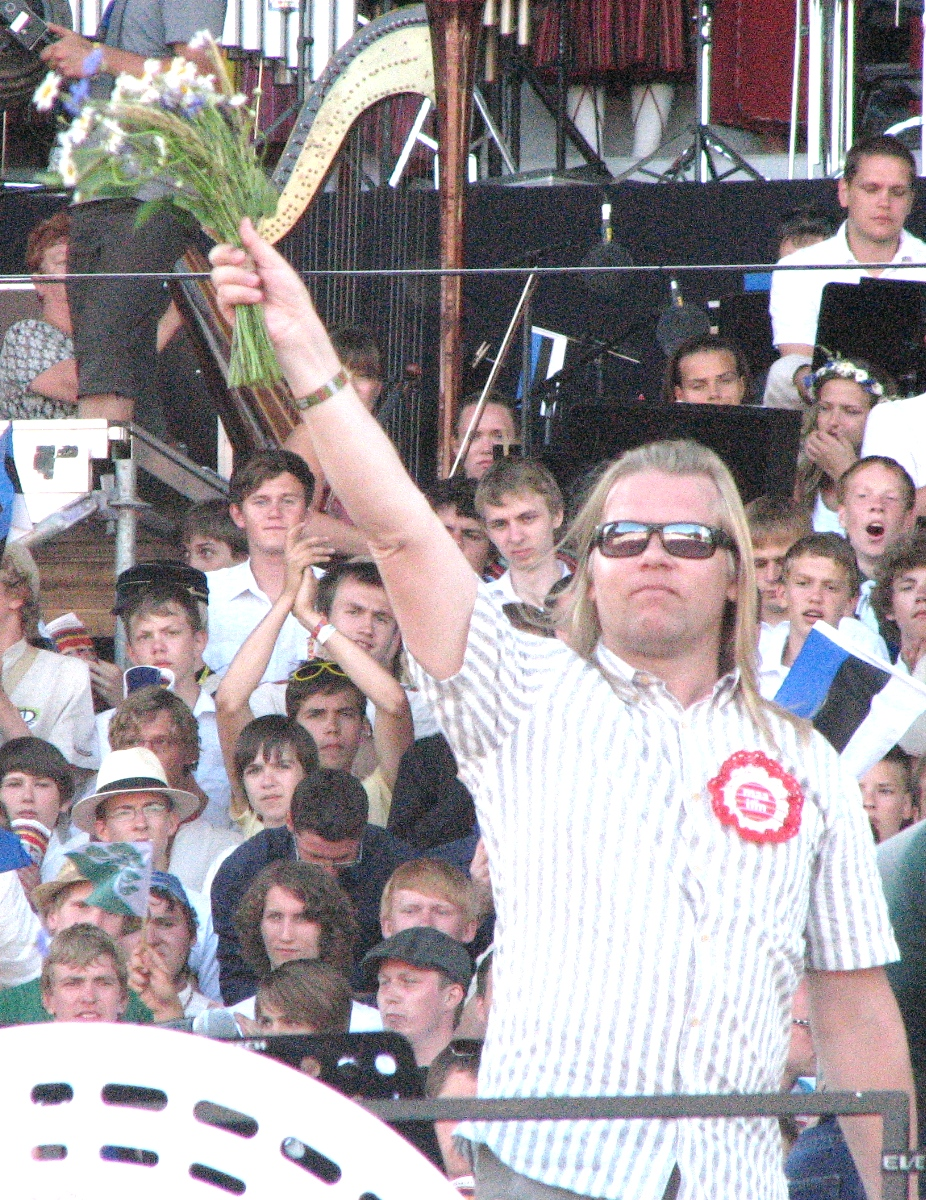
Heini Vaikmaa

Heini Vaikmaa (born 5 July 1958) is an Estonian musician and composer.

He was the founder of the band Mahavok. With Mahavok he participated in Eesti Laul 2010.

== Works ==
- Rock opera "Hing ja iha"
- Rock opera "Võti paradiisi"
