= Kristjan Kangro =

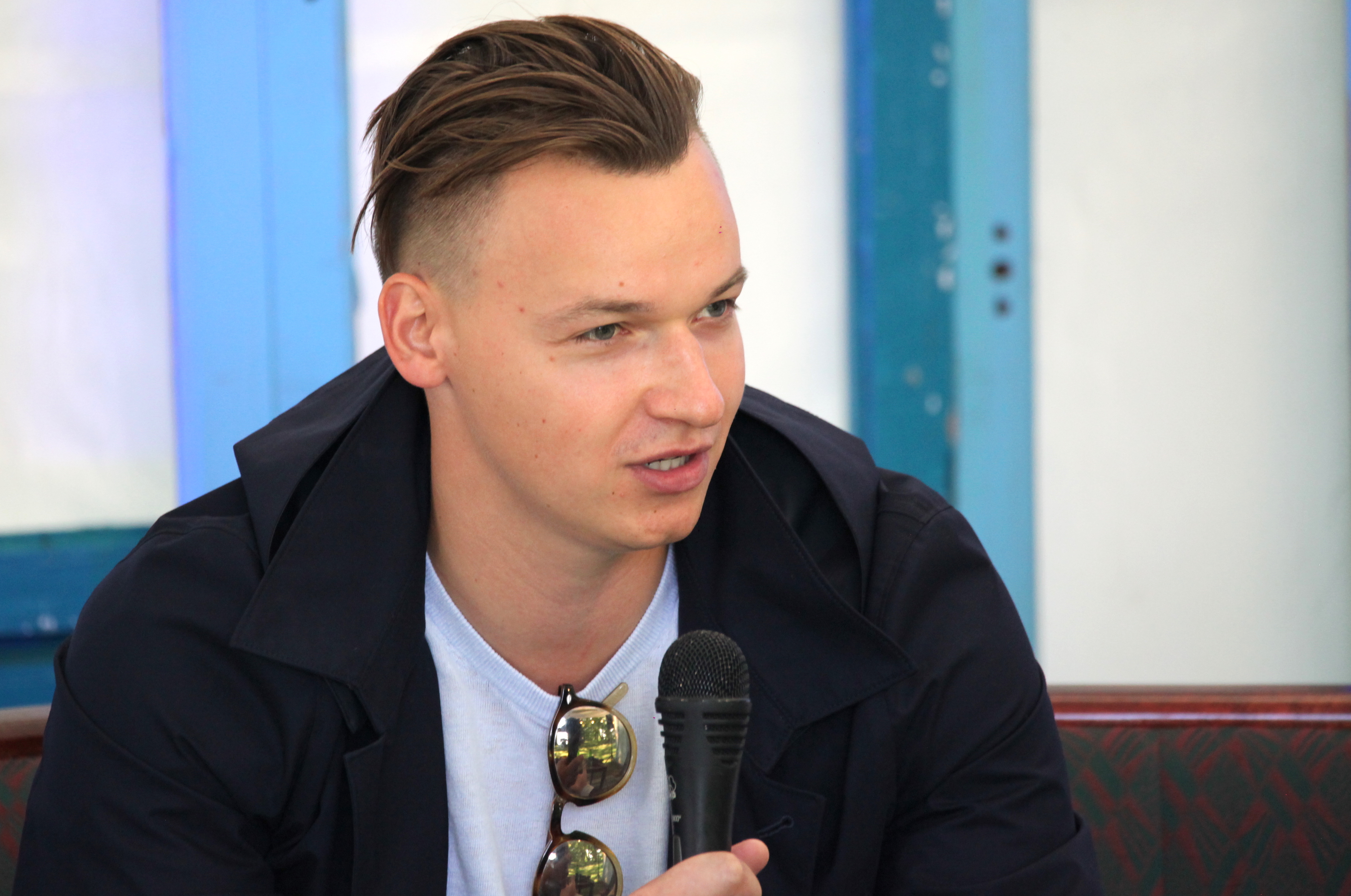
Kristjan Kangro (2021)

Kristjan Kangro is an Estonian entrepreneur and investor who is founder and CEO of Estonian fintech firm Change.

== Education ==
Kangro completed his bachelor's degree majoring in finance at Maastricht University and participated in an exchange semester at the National University of Singapore.

== Career ==
At the age of 17, Kangro launched his first company, an electronics accessories venture SOCKme, which received recognition from the Estonian Prime minister and Norwegian Crown Prince. The company was recognized as top 5 student company in European Union and the best in Estonia.

He later moved to the Netherlands, where he founded SwingBy, a startup specializing in automated scheduling tools. The company was acquired by Wil Lennaerts, the founder of MadMouse.

After that, he moved to Singapore and took on the role of CFO at Expara, a venture capital firm, where he focused on growing its fintech portfolio.

In 2016, Kangro founded Change, a fintech firm offering an investment app and multi-asset brokerage platform encompassing cryptocurrencies, stocks, derivatives, and yield products.

In October 2018, his company raised $17.5 million in a crowdfunding campaign and €22 million in three investment rounds combined.

In 2021, Change was valued at 175 million, and the Estonian newspaper Äripäev estimated Kangro to be the 43rd richest person in Estonia at the age of 28 years old.

In 2018, he was nominated as Leader of Tomorrow in 48th St. Gallen Symposium. He also holds board and advisory roles, including supervisory board positions at Income (2020-2022), Danabijak (2018-2020) and Kingdom Technologies.

In 2023, Ingmar Mattus, the founder of Tickmill, a UK-based brokerage, acquired 7.8% shareholding in Change from Kristjan Kangro.

In August 2023 private equity company Andromeda Capital acquired a majority stake in Change by buying equity from Kristjan Kangro, increasing its stake in the company from 10% to 51%.
