= Mart Kangur (poet) =

Estonian poet, translator and philosopher

Mart Kangur (born 4 May 1971) is an Estonian poet, translator and philosopher.

From 1991 to 2005, he attended at Estonian Institute of Humanities, studying languages, literary theory, philosophy and Oriental studies.

Since 2006, he is a member of Estonian Writers' Union.

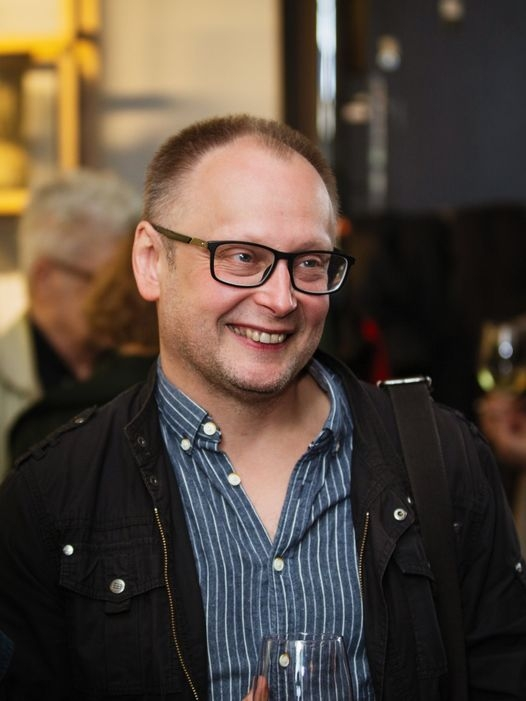
Mart Kangur in 2022

== Works ==
- 2005: prose collection (with Ivar Ravi, Jaak Rand) "Jaak Rand ja teisi jutte" ('Jaak Rand and Other Stories')
- 2009: poetry collection "Kuldne põli" ('The Golden Age')
- 2015: poetry collection "Kõrgusekartus" ('Fear of Heights')
- 2017: poetry collection "Liivini lahti" ('Cut Open to Juhan Liiv')
