= Ruila =

Village in Estonia

Coordinates: 59°11′N 024°26′E

- Village
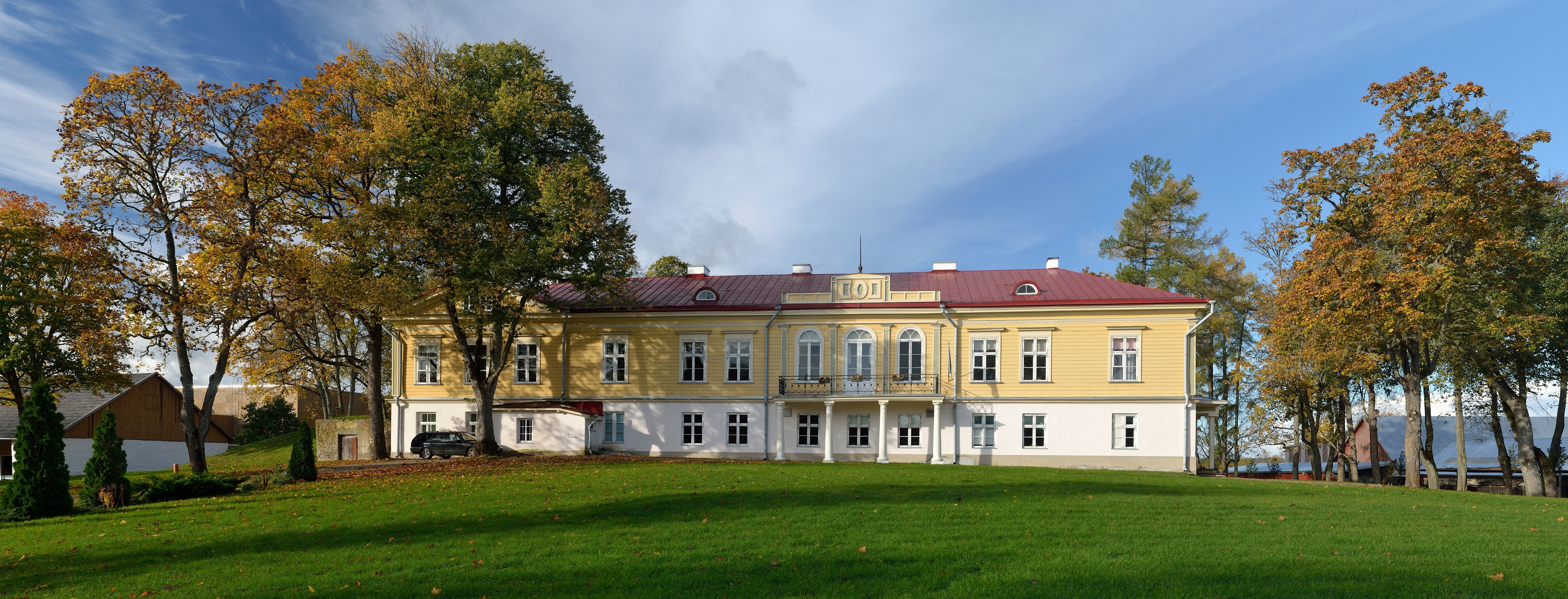
- Ruila manor house
- Interactive map of Ruila
- Country: Estonia
- County: Harju County
- Parish: Saue Parish
- Time zone: UTC+2 (EET)
  - Summer (DST): UTC+3 (EEST)

Ruila (German: Ruil) is a village in Saue Parish, Harju County in northern Estonia. Prior to the administrative reform of Estonian local governments in 2017, the village belonged to Kernu Parish.

== Ruila Manor ==
Ruila estate was first mentioned in 1417. The presently visible building was, however, erected in 1859 by the Baltic German family von Bremen, who owned the estate at the time. The last member of the von Bremen family left in October 1939, as a part of the resettlement policy enforced by the Molotov–Ribbentrop Pact. The main building of the manor has a ground floor built out of stone and a second storey constructed of wood. It today houses a school, a small local museum and a riding centre.

== Gallery ==
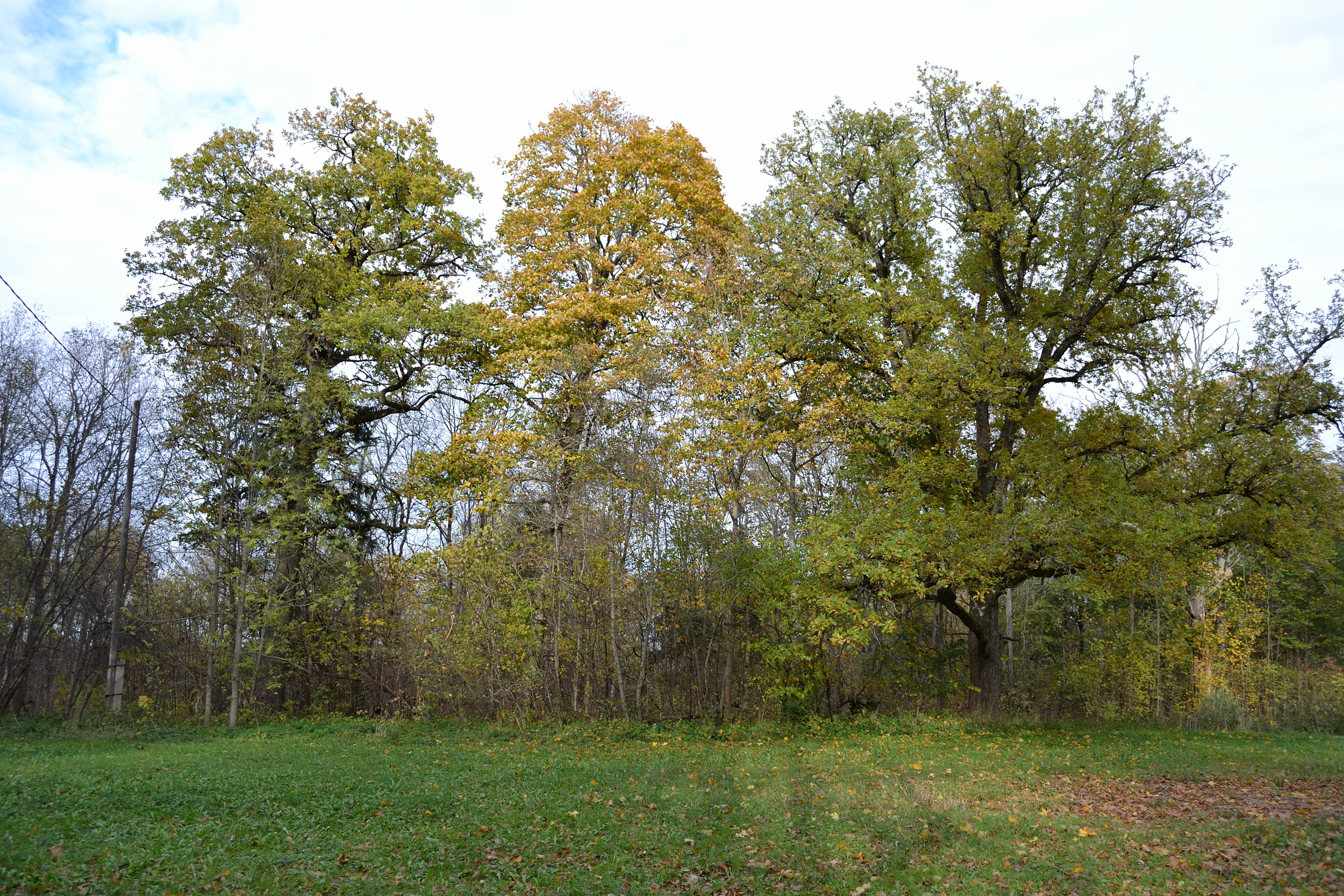
Park of Ruila Manor

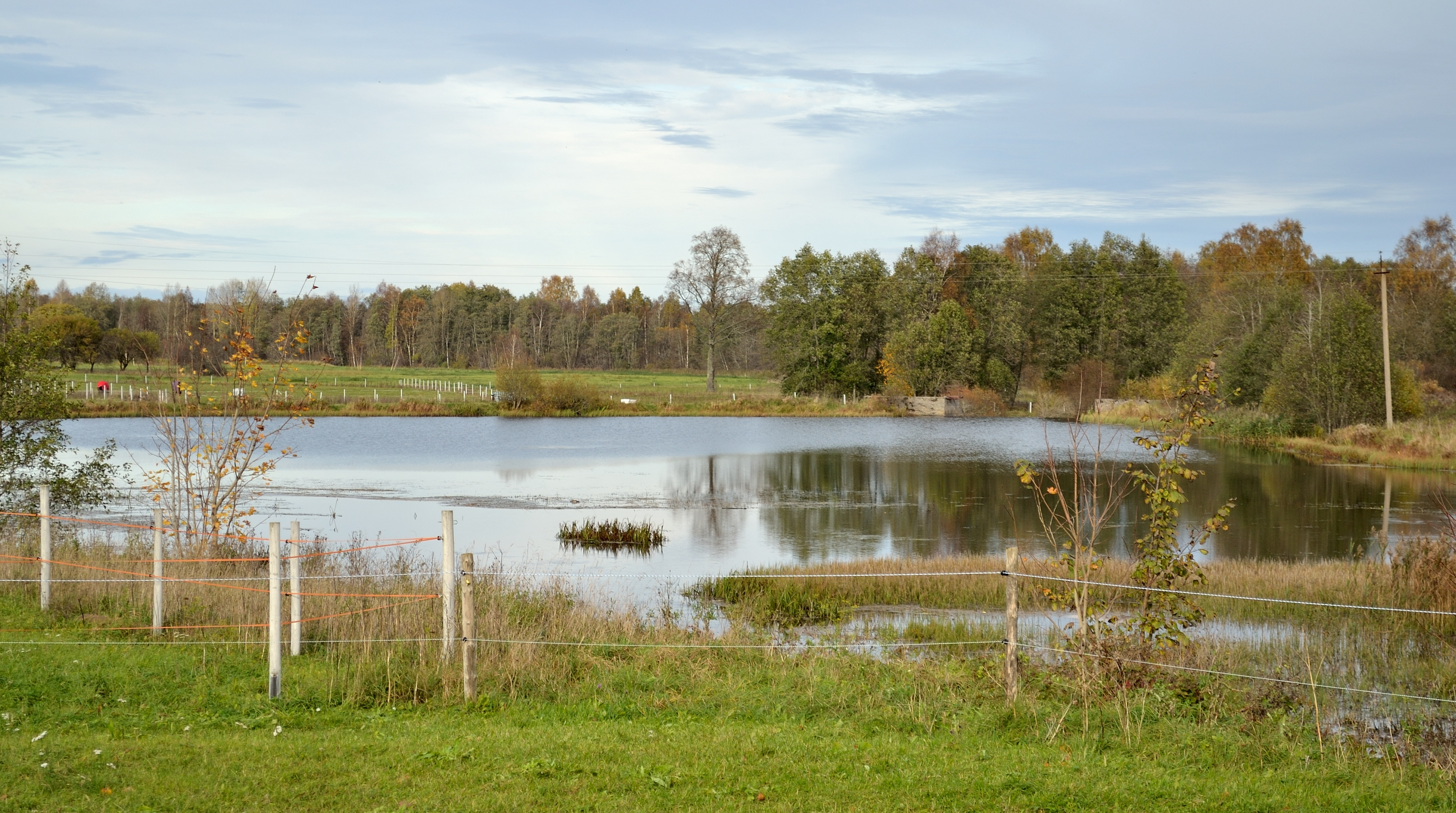
Lake Ruila
