= Estonian national road 8 =

Road in Estonia

National Road 8
- Põhimaantee 8

Route information
- Length: 49 km (30 mi)

Major junctions
- From: Tallinn
- Tallinn Keila; Keila; Niitvälja Paldiski
- To: Paldiski

Location
- Country: Estonia
- Counties: Harju County

Highway system
- Transport in Estonia
| ← T7 | → T9 |

Tallinn-Paldiski maantee (Tallinn-Paldiski highway; alternatively Põhimaantee nr 8, unofficially abbreviated T8) is a 49.1-kilometre long national main road in Estonia. The road runs from the centre of Tallinn to Paldiski. The road partially follows the path of European route E265. The road forms an important commuter route, connecting Keila and suburban villages to western Tallinn. Past Keila the route serves truck traffic joining from the T11 heading for the port of Paldiski, connecting to Kapellskär via ferry.

In 2021, the highest traffic volumes were recorded exiting Tallinn, with AADT measured at 15,000, with figures also high around Keila. One in nine vehicles entering Paldiski is heavy traffic, signifying the route's importance.

The port of Paldiski is used often for Allied military transportation and oversize cargo (such as wind turbines). Despite this, no plans exist to upgrade the highway, except for a future interchange exiting Tallinn and a potential bypass for Keila. Presently, the route is fully single carriageway.

== Route description ==
The T8 connects the capital of the country, to the port town of Paldiski. The western part of the highway is part of European route E265, transferring from the T11 bypassing Keila.

The route begins in Tallinn from Viru Square and runs through the city for 11 kilometres, following the city streets of Pärnu maantee, Kaarli puiestee, Toompuiestee, Tehnika and Paldiski maantee. Exiting the city it serves the borough of Harku and the villages Hüüru, Kiia, Tutermaa.

Reaching Keila the T8 intersects with the T11 at a roundabout and becomes part of E265. A total of five roundabouts are used to bypass Keila, with the road continuing in a westerly direction. The highway's follows its original, twisty, 19th century route until Kersalu, with the speed limit dropping to only 50km/h in Kloogaranna.

The highway meets the Baltic briefly, after which it turns away from the old route, redirected towards the ports of Paldiski. The E265 departs from the national route just before the town, heading for the South Harbour. Truck traffic headed for Kapellskär heads off on the intersection of Peetri, Lõuna and Rae streets, the T8 continuing on Rae. The highway terminates a kilometre later at the central square of Paldiski.

=== Road length of lane ===
| 11 km | 36 km | 2 km |
| Urban | 1+1 road | Urban |

== Route table ==
The route is entirely in Harju County (Tallinn, Saue, Harku, Keila, Lääne-Harju).

| Municipality | Location | km | mi | Destinations | Notes |
|---|---|---|---|---|---|
| Tallinn | Viru väljak | 0.0 | 0.0 | | Viru Square is the starting point for four highways - Tallinn-Narva, Tallinn-Tartu, Tallinn-Pärnu and Tallinn-Paldiski. Concurrency with T4. |
| Tallinn | Vabaduse väljak | | | Estonian national road 4 | Urban intersection. End of concurrency with T4 |
| Tallinn | Haabersti | | | – Tabasalu; Mustamäe | Urban roundabout interchange, T8 crosses on flyover. |
| Tallinn | Järvekalda | | | Estonian national road 11182 | Urban intersection |
| Saue | Harku | | | – Laagri, Harku | |
| Saue | Harku | | | Estonian national road 11401 Estonian national road 11191 | Proposed interchange with proposed Juuliku-Tabasalu highway. |
| Saue | Harku | | | – Rannamõisa, Tabasalu | |
| Saue | Hüüru | | | – Alliku | |
| Saue | Püha | | | – Saue, Alliku | |
| Saue | Kiia | | | – Viti, Keila-Joa, Vääna | |
| Harku | Tutermaa | | | – Vanamõisa | |
| Harku | Kumna | | | – Vääna, Humala | |
| Harku | Kumna | | | – Kumna centre | |
| Harku | – | | | Estonian national road 11 European route E265 | Proposed northern bypass of Keila, onto which T8 would be redesignated. |
| Harku | Ülejõe | | | – Maardu, Saue | Roundabout |
| Keila | Luha | | | – Haapsalu, Keila centre | Roundabout |
| Keila | Karjaküla | | | – Karjaküla; Keila centre | Roundabout |
| Lääne-Harju | Valkse | | | – Keila-Joa, Tõmmiku | |
| Lääne-Harju | Niitvälja | | | – Haapsalu, Lehola, Niitvälja centre | |
| Lääne-Harju | Tuulna | | | – Klooga | |
| Lääne-Harju | Kloogaranna | | | – Tallinn, Laulasmaa | |
| Lääne-Harju | Kloogaranna | | | – Ranna road | |
| Lääne-Harju | Kloogaranna | | | – | |
| Lääne-Harju | Kersalu | | | – Madise | |
| Lääne-Harju | Paldiski | | | – Kapellskär, Padise, South Harbour | |
| Lääne-Harju | Paldiski | | | – | Urban intersection |
1.000 mi = 1.609 km; 1.000 km = 0.621 mi: Concurrency terminus; Incomplete access; Proposed

== See also ==
- Transport in Estonia
