= Keila Parish =

Former municipality of Estonia

Coordinates: 59°21′05″N 24°35′56″E

Keila Parish Keila vald
- Former municipality of Estonia
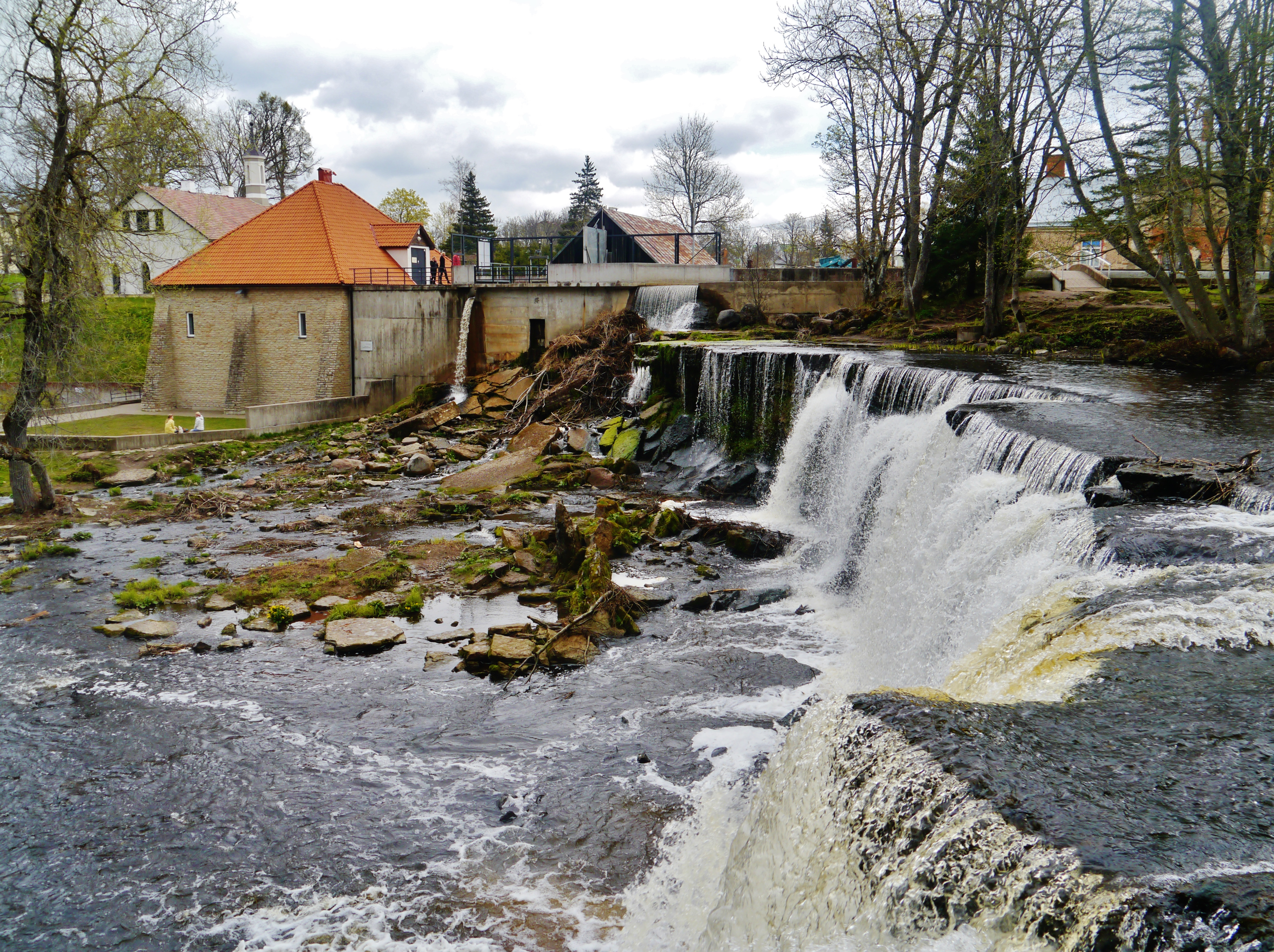
- Keila-Joa waterfall

- Flag Coat of arms

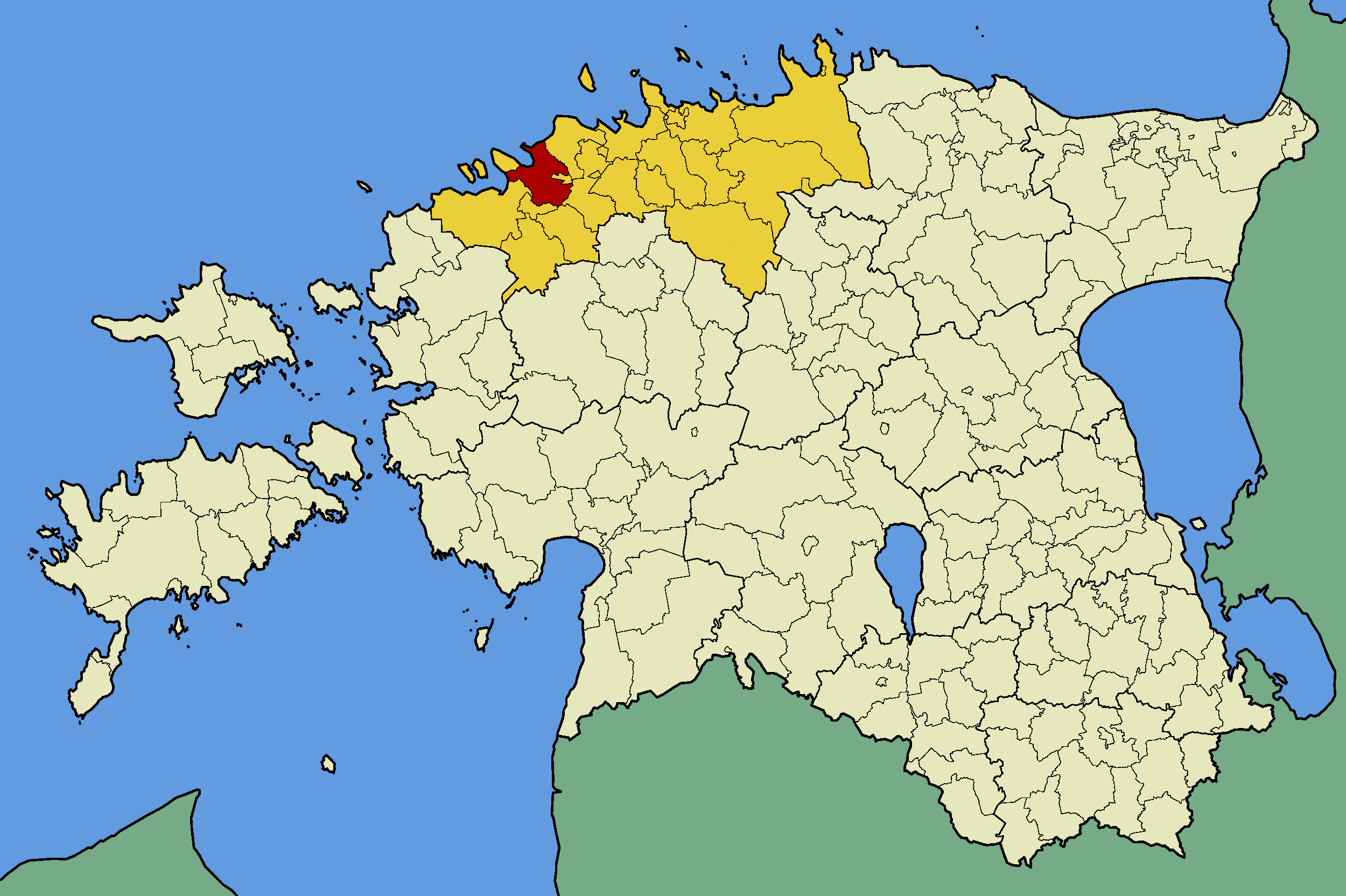
- Keila Parish within Harju County.
- Country: Estonia
- County: Harju County
- Administrative centre: Keila

Government
  - Mayor: Jaan Alver (2014–2017)

Area
  - Total: 178.97 km^{2} (69.10 sq mi)

Population (01.01.2004)
  - Total: 3,995
  - Density: 22.32/km^{2} (57.81/sq mi)
- Website: www.keilavald.ee

Keila Parish (Estonian: Keila vald) was a rural municipality in north-western Estonia. It was a part of Harju County. The municipality had a population of 3,995 (as of 1 January 2004) and covered an area of 178.97 km^{2}. The population density was 22.3 inhabitants per km^{2}.

Local administration of the municipality was located in the town of Keila, although the town itself constitutes separate urban municipality and was not part of Keila Parish. In Keila Parish there were 3 small boroughs (Estonian: alevikud): Karjaküla, Klooga, Keila-Joa and 19 villages (Estonian: külad): Illurma, Käesalu, Keelva, Kersalu, Kloogaranna, Kulna, Laoküla, Laulasmaa, Lehola, Lohusalu, Maeru, Meremõisa, Nahkjala, Niitvälja, Ohtu, Põllküla, Tõmmiku, Tuulna, Valkse.

Keila Parish was one of the four municipalities merged into Lääne-Harju Parish with the administrative reform of 2017. The last mayor (vallavanem) from 2014 to 2017 was Jaan Alver from the Estonian Reform Party.

== Gallery ==
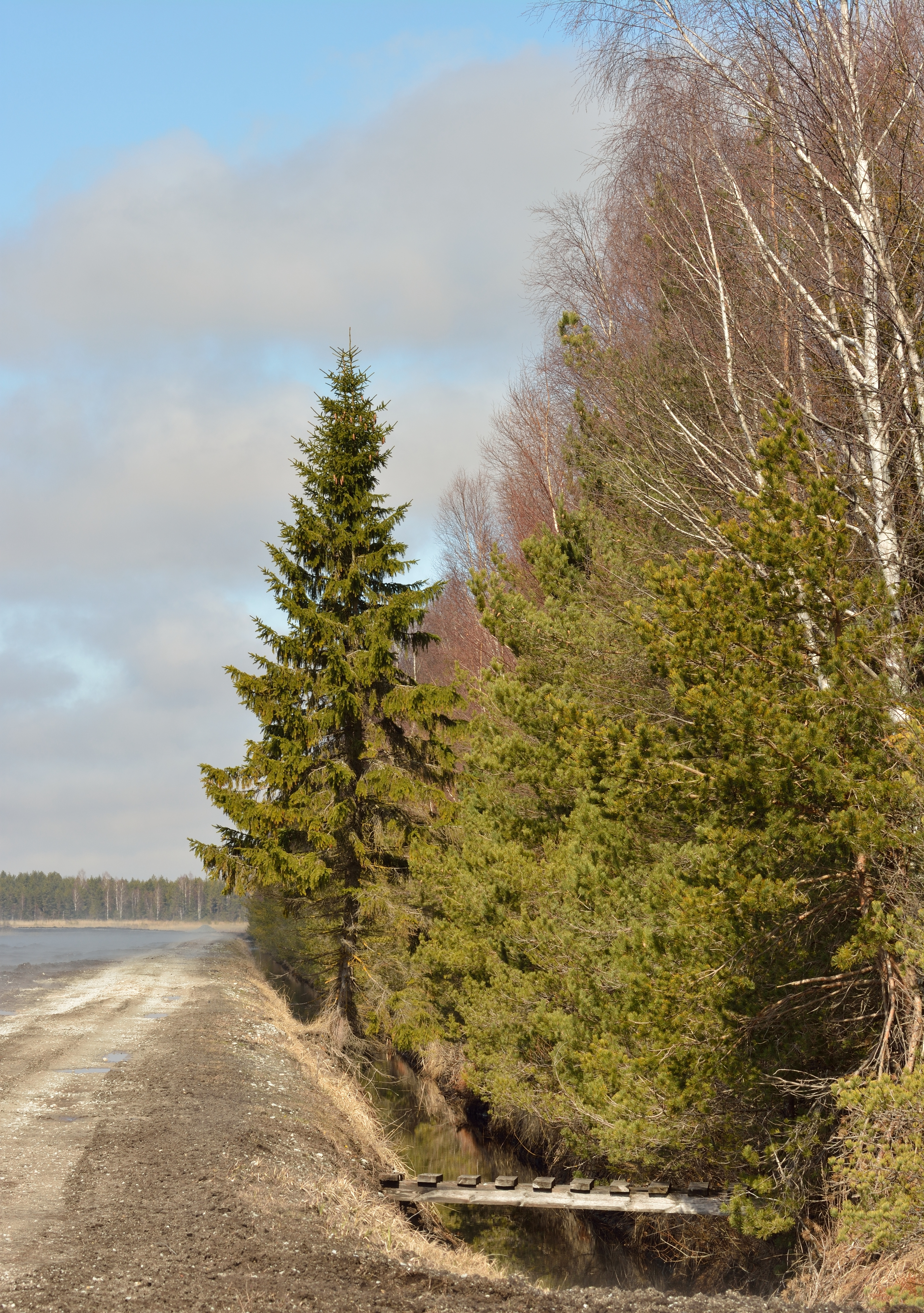
Ohtu bog

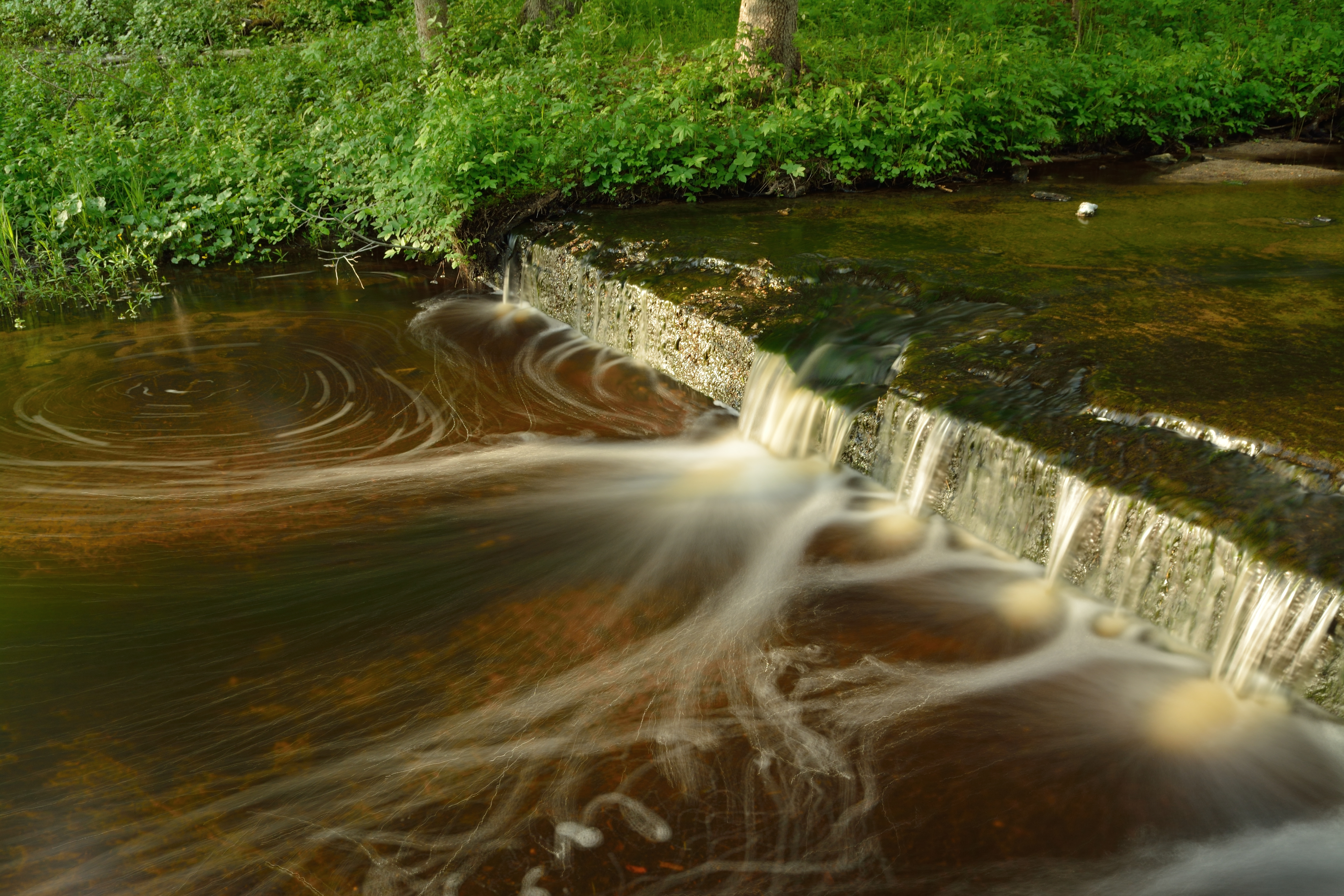
Treppoja

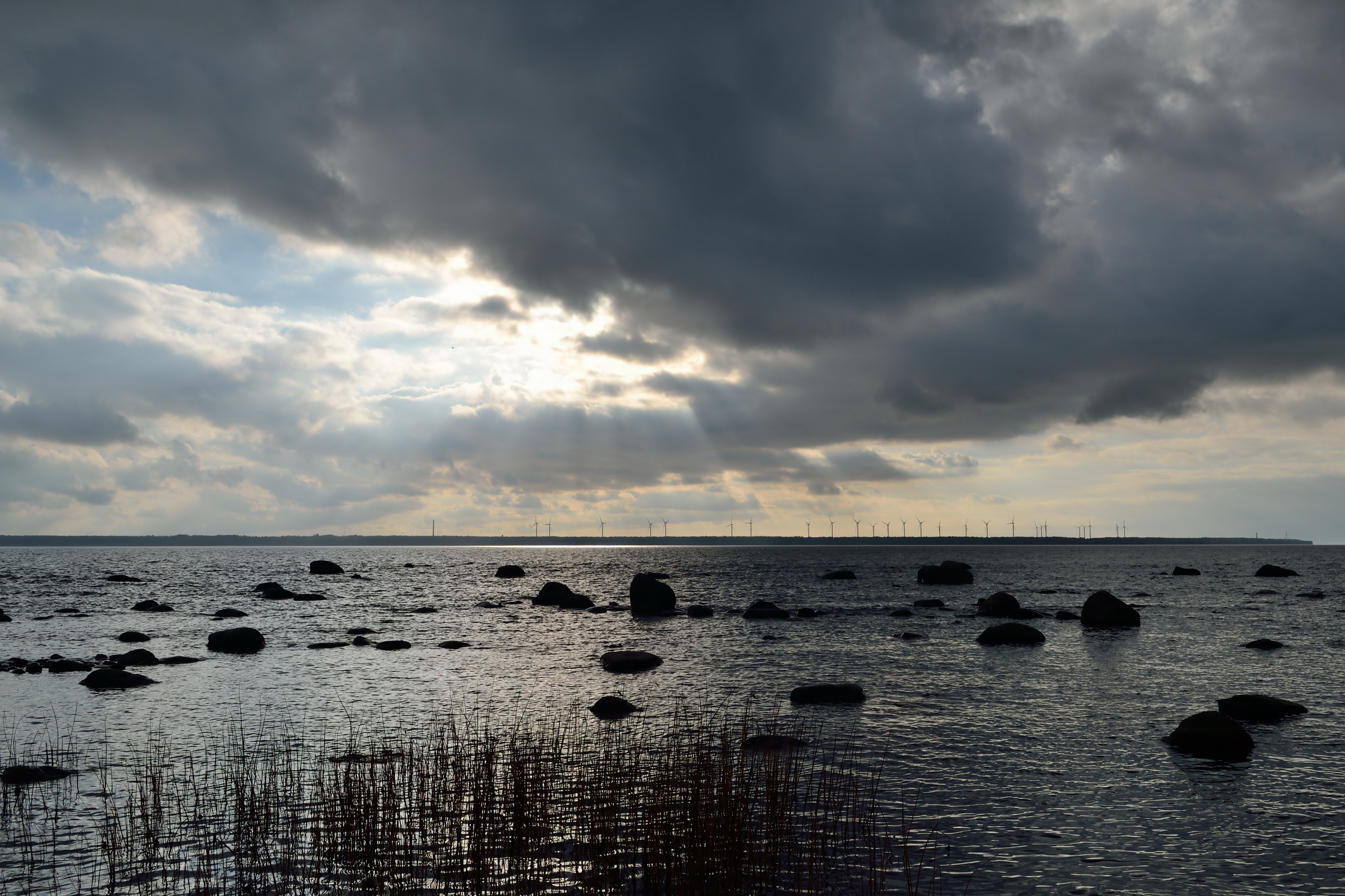
Lahepere bay and Pakri peninsula

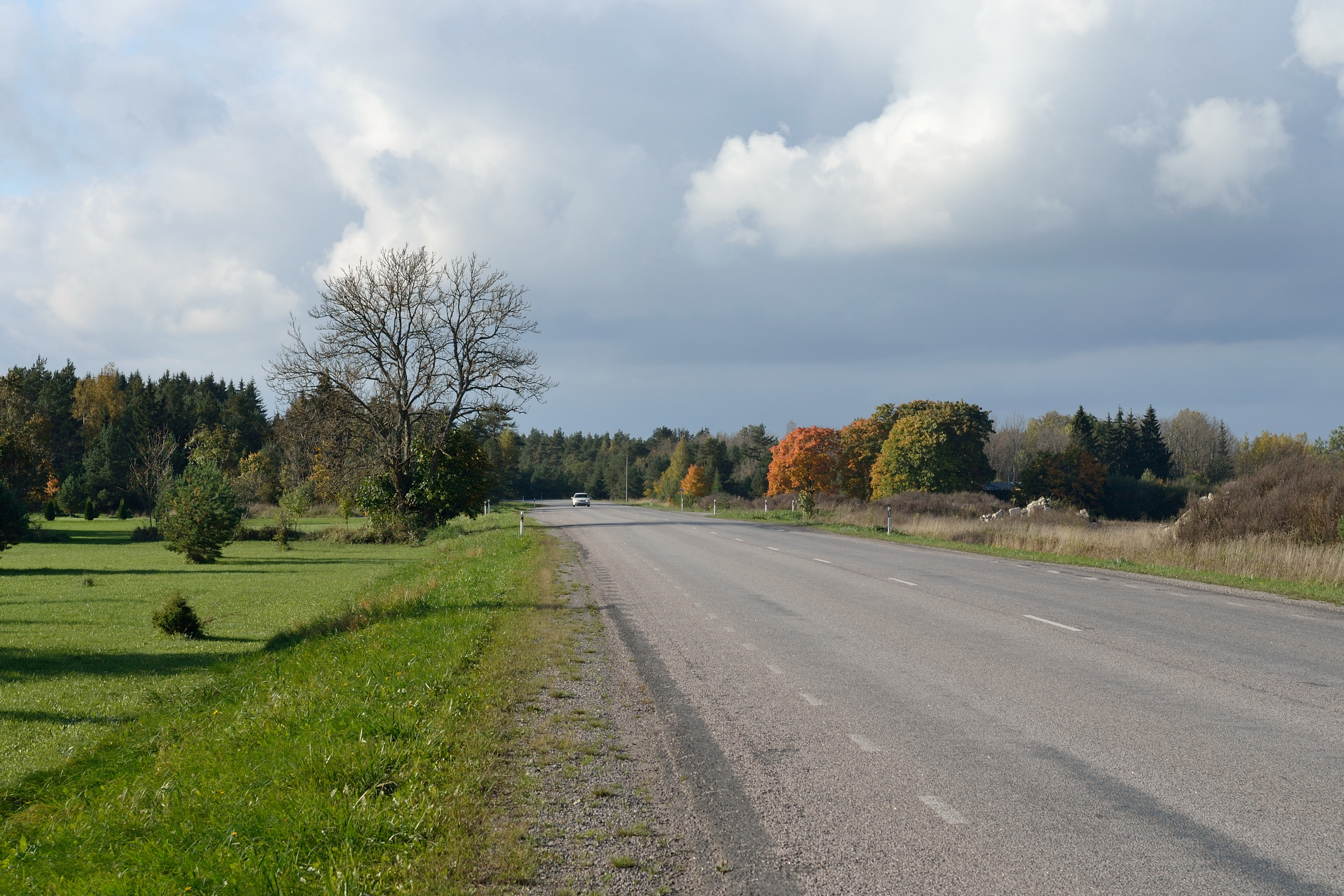
Tallinn–Paldiski road in Valkse

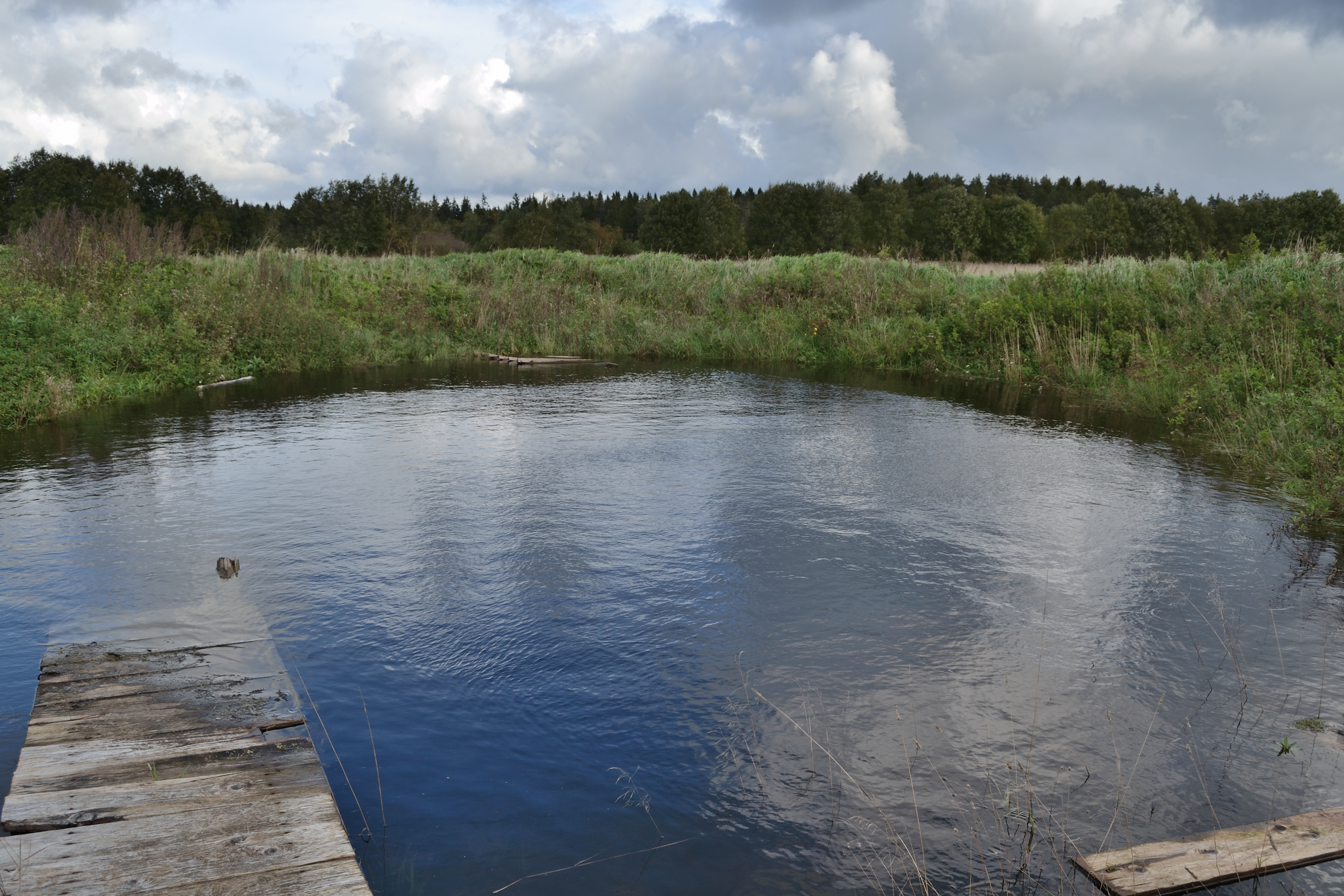
Offering spring in Ohtu

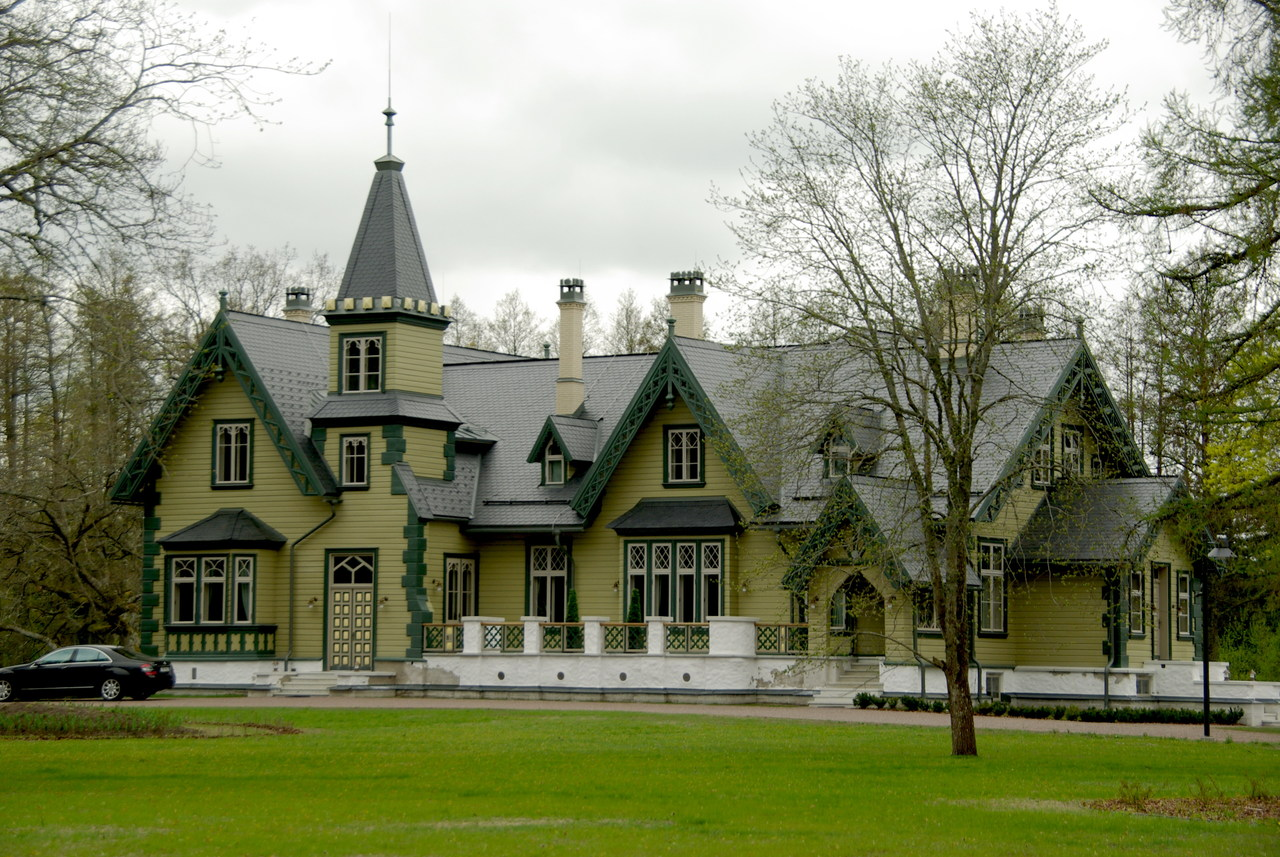
Kõltsu manor
