= Hüüru =

Village in Estonia

- Village
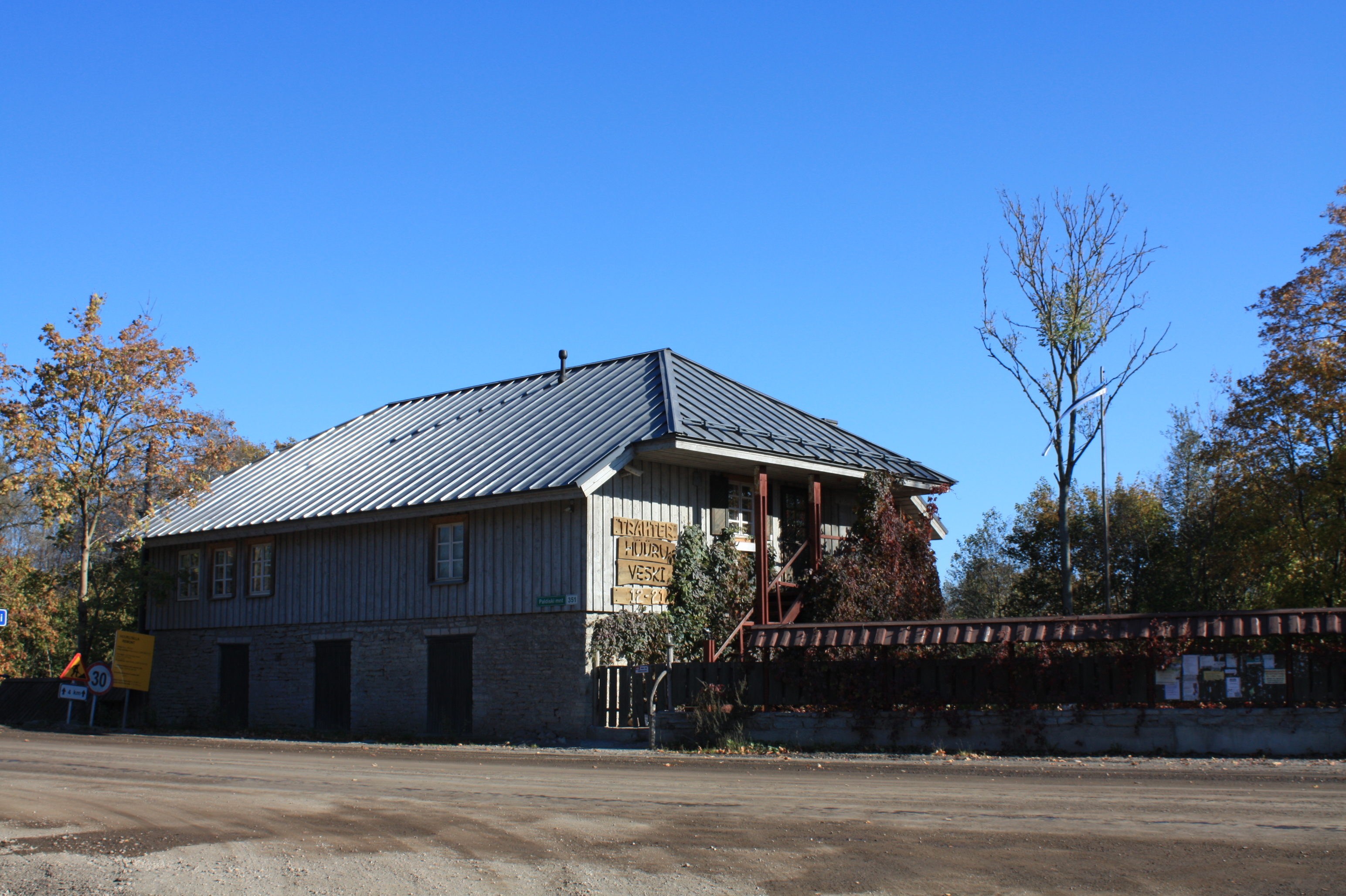
- Hüüru watermill

- Location in Estonia
- Coordinates: 59°22′49″N 24°32′23″E
- Country: Estonia
- County: Harju County
- Municipality: Saue Parish
- First mentioned: 1241

Population (01.01.2012)
  - Total: 417

Hüüru is a village in Saue Parish, Harju County in northern Estonia. It's located 3 km (1.9 mi) west of the border of Tallinn (and about 13 km (8 mi) from the city centre), on the crossing of Tallinn–Paldiski road (E265) and Vääna River, just next to Harku. Hüüru has a population of 417 (as of 1 January 2012).

Hüüru was first mentioned in the Danish Census Book in 1241 as Hiurenkylae. In 1560 the Hüüru Manor (Hüer) was established on the site of the Harku Manor's watermill. The watermill had existed already in 1540–50. The main building of the manor was built in partially in the 18th and 19th centuries. Nowadays it is used as a local library. The watermill is situated just by the road houses.

== Gallery ==
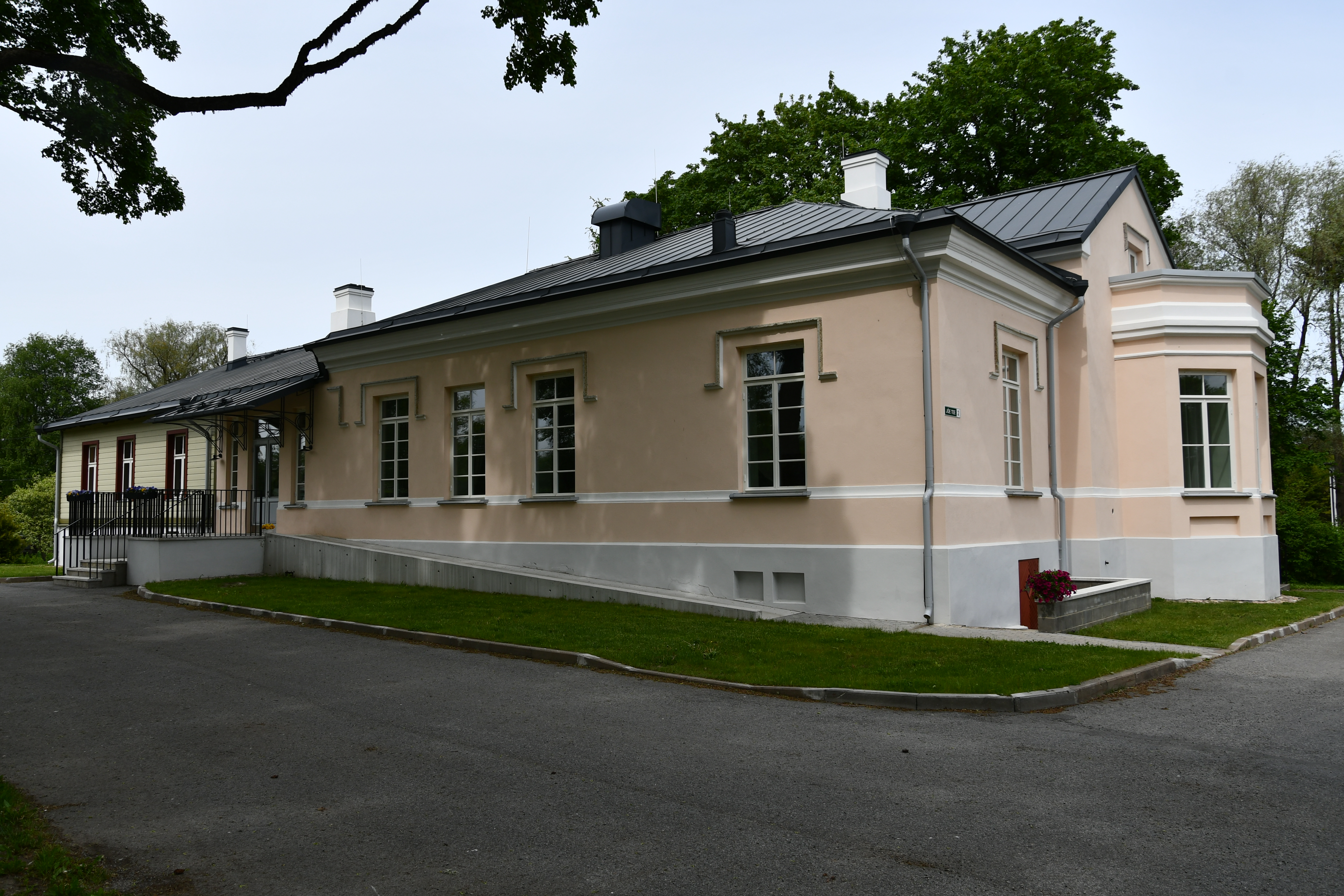
Hüüru Manor. Now the service point for Saue libraries and the Hüüru Village Society

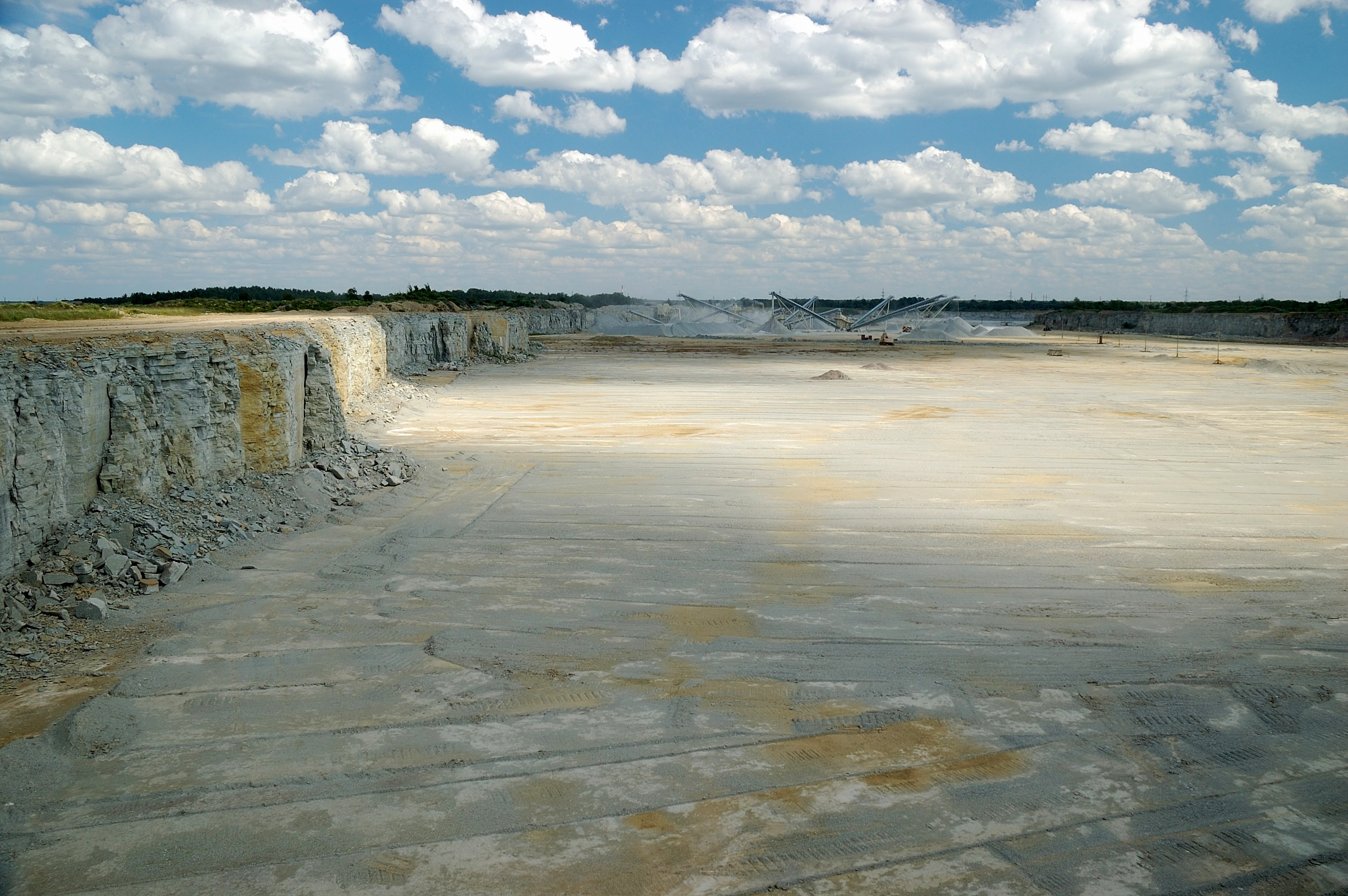
Harku quarry in Hüüru
