= Suure-Aru Nature Reserve =

Protected area in Estonia

- Location within Estonia
- Location: Estonia
- Nearest city: Vasalemma
- Coordinates: 59°14′N 24°24′E
- Area: 703 ha (1,740 acres)
- Established: 2014

Suure-Aru Nature Reserve is a nature reserve which is located in Harju County, Estonia.

The area of the nature reserve is 703 ha.

The protected area was founded in 2014 to protect valuable habitat types and threatened species in Kabila village (Kernu Parish), in Tuula village (Saue Parish) and in Ohtu village (Keila Parish).
