= Tiit Mae =

Estonian politician

Tiit Mae (born 28 February 1960) is an Estonian politician. He was a member of X Riigikogu.

== Early life ==
Mae was born in Kohtla-Järve. He is a 1978 graduate of Tallinn 39th Secondary School.

== Career ==
Mae was elected to X Riigikogu in 2003, representing the People's Union of Estonia. He was also a member of the Committee on European Union Affairs and former municipal elder of Keila Parish.
