= Kiia =

Kiia may refer to:

- Kinomichi Instructors International Association, KIIA
- Kiia, Estonia, village in Estonia
- Kiia (singer) Canadian singer
