= E265 =

E265 can refer to:

- European route E265, a European route
- Dehydroacetic acid, a chemical compound
