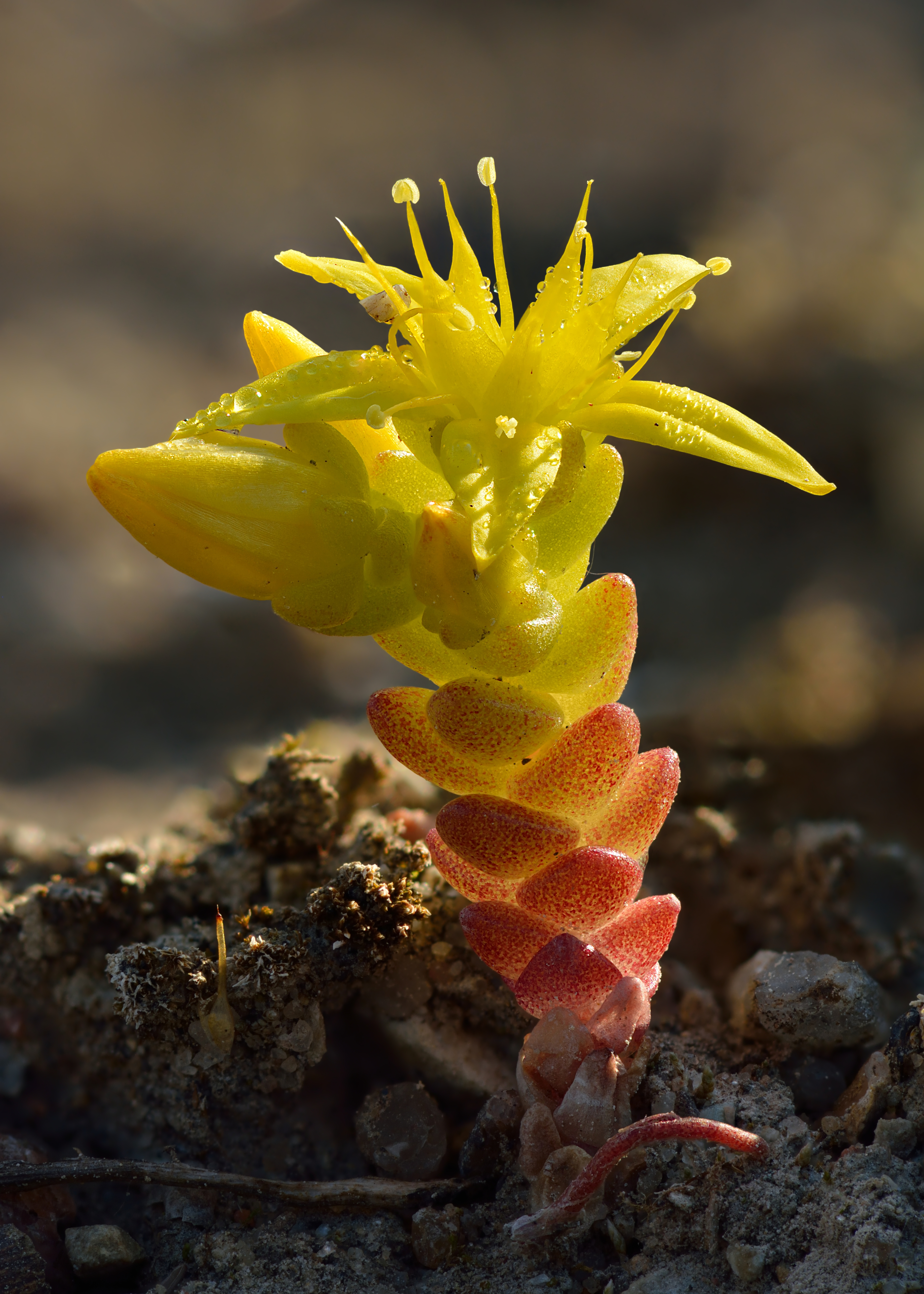
- In Niitvälja, Estonia

Scientific classification
- Kingdom: Plantae
- Clade: Tracheophytes
- Clade: Angiosperms
- Clade: Eudicots
- Order: Saxifragales
- Family: Crassulaceae
- Genus: Sedum
- Species: S. acre

Binomial name
- Sedum acre L.

Synonyms
- List: Sedum drucei Graebn.; Sedum erectum Freyn; Sedum glaciale Clarion ex DC.; Sedum krajinae Domin; Sedum neglectum Ten.; Sedum neglectum var. sopianae Priszter; Sedum procumbens Schrank; Sedum robustum (Velen.) Domin; Sedum wettsteinii Freyn; Sedum zlatiborense Domin

= Sedum acre =

Species of plant in the stonecrop family

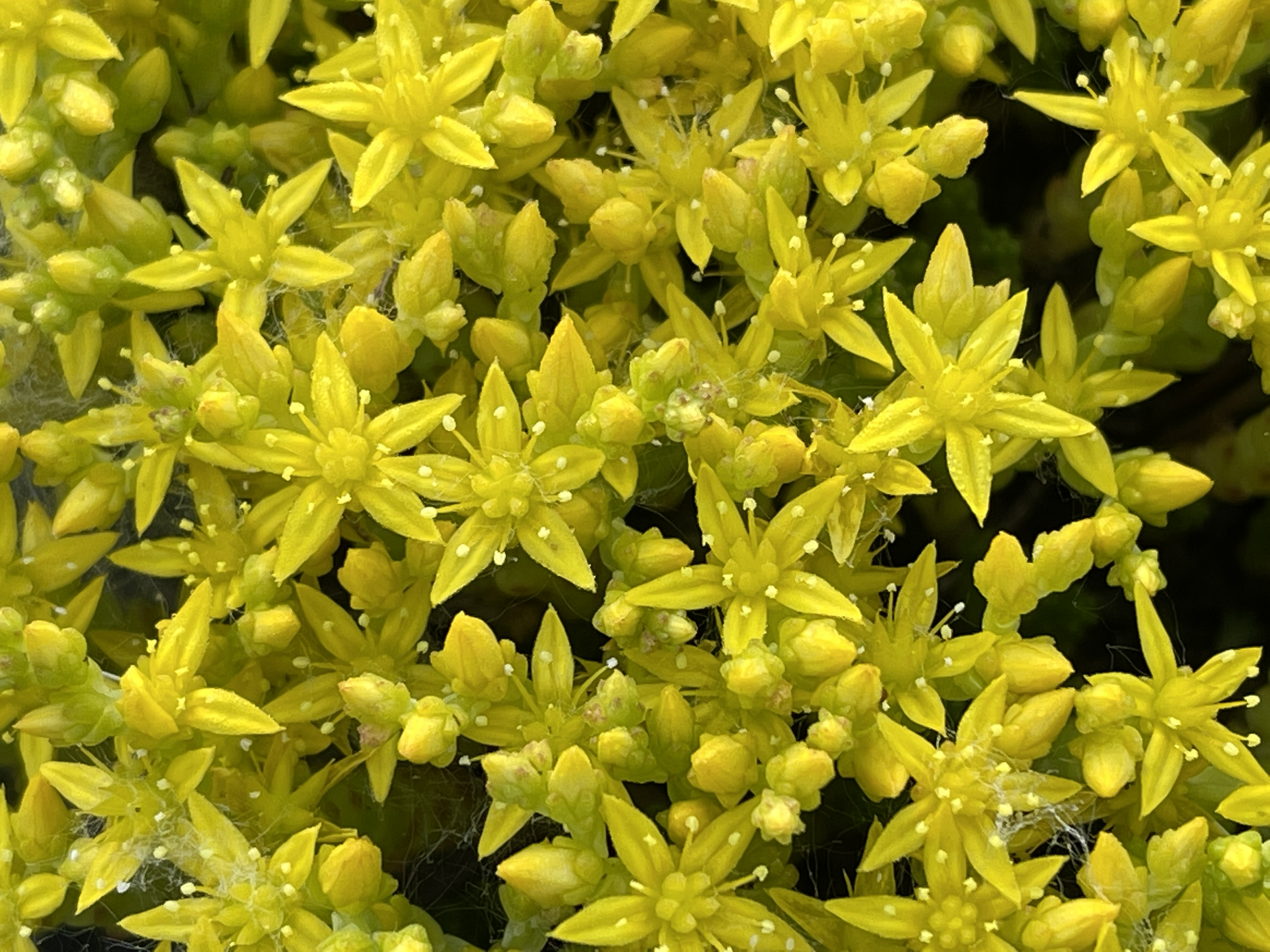
S. acre in Batiscan, Quebec, Canada

Sedum acre, commonly known as the goldmoss stonecrop, mossy stonecrop, goldmoss sedum, biting stonecrop, and wallpepper, is a perennial flowering plant in the family Crassulaceae. It is native to Europe, northern and western Asia and North Africa, but is also naturalised in North America, southern South America, Japan, and New Zealand.

== Description ==
The biting stonecrop is a tufted evergreen perennial that forms mat-like stands some 5 to 12 cm (2 to 5 in) tall. For much of the year, the stems are short, semi-prostrate and densely clad in leaves. At the flowering time in June and July, the stems lengthen and are erect, somewhat limp and often pinkish-brown with the leaves further apart. The leaves are alternate, fleshy and shortly cylindrical with a rounded tip. They are also sometimes tinged with red. The starry flowers form a three to six-flowered cyme. The calyx has five fleshy sepals fused at the base, the corolla consists of five regular bright yellow petals, there are ten stamens, a separate gynoecium and five pistils. The fruit consists of five united, many-seeded follicles. The leaves contain an acrid fluid that can cause skin rashes.

== Habitat ==
Biting stonecrop is a low-growing plant that cannot compete with more vigorous, fast-growing species. It is specially adapted for growing on thin dry soils and can be found on dry grassland, shingle, beaches, drystone walls, dry banks, seashore rocks, roadside verges, wasteland and in sandy meadows near the sea.

== Cultivation ==
Biting stonecrop spreads when allowed to do so, but is easily controlled, being shallow-rooted. It is used in hanging baskets and container gardens, as a trailing accent, in borders, or as groundcover. This plant grows as a creeping ground cover, often in dry sandy soil, but also in the cracks of masonry. It grows well in poor soils, sand, rock gardens, and rich garden soil, under a variety of light levels.

Biting stonecrop is said to have a peppery taste (hence the name "biting") and is sometimes used in herbal medicine. However, it is considered to be poisonous and consumption is discouraged.
