= Keila railway station =

Railway station in Harju County, Estonia

Keila
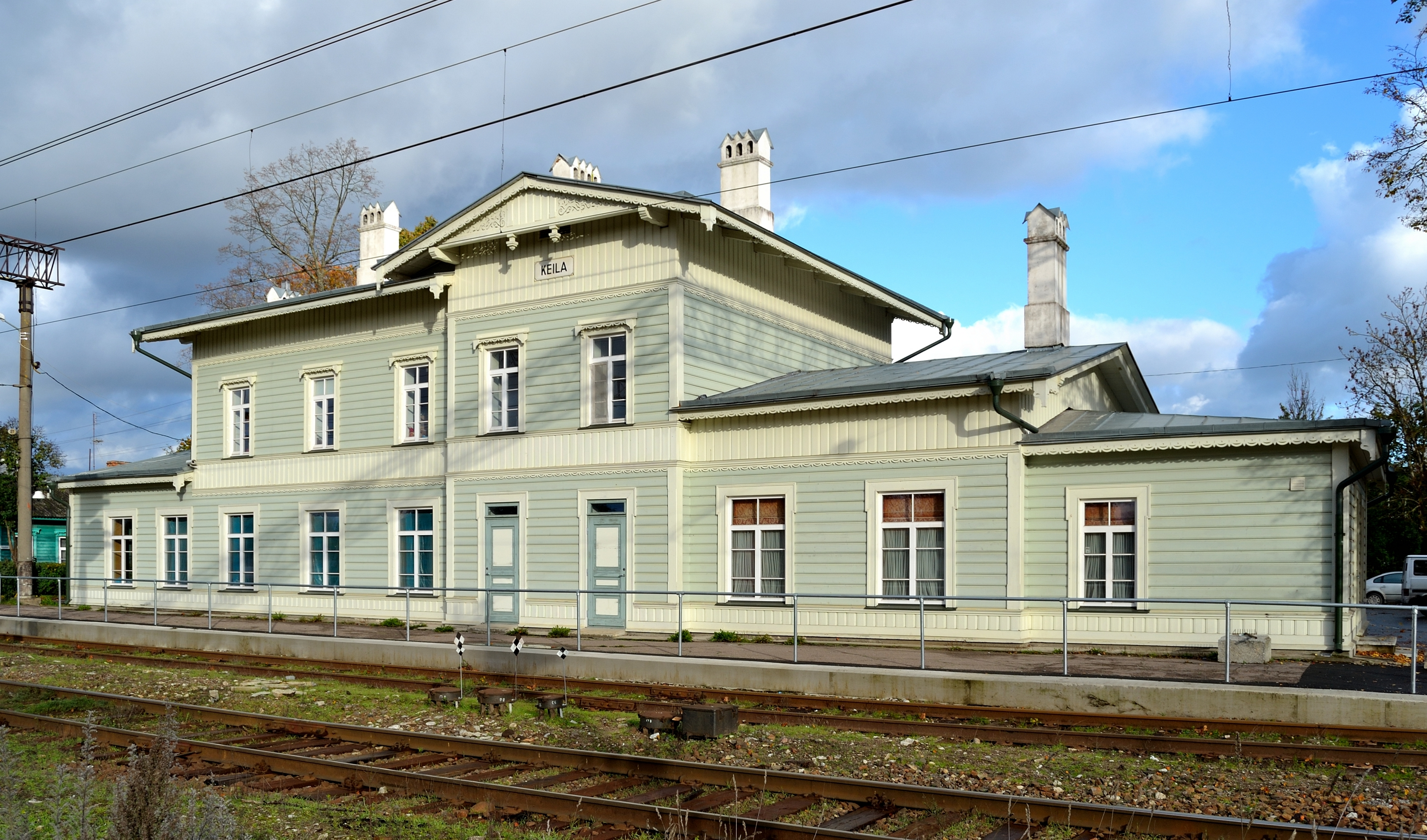
- Keila railway station in 2011

General information
- Location: Keila, Harju County; Estonia
- Coordinates: 59.306058°N 24.415914°E
- System: railway station
- Owner: Eesti Raudtee (EVR)
- Platforms: 2
- Tracks: 5
- Train operators: Elron
- Connections: Regional Buses S9 K11 K12 K14 110 133

Construction
- Structure type: at-grade
- Accessible: Yes

Other information
- Fare zone: III

History
- Opened: 1870; 156 years ago
- Electrified: 1958

Services
Preceding station	Elron	Following station
Valingu towards Tallinn	Tallinn–Turba/Paldiski	Kulna towards Turba
Valingu towards Tallinn	Tallinn–Turba/Paldiski	Niitvälja towards Paldiski
Location
- Location within Estonia Location within Harju County

Keila railway station (Estonian: Keila raudteejaam) is a railway station serving the town of Keila in Harju County in northern Estonia.

Keila railway station is located on the Tallinn–Keila railway line, approximately 26 km (16 mi) southwest from the Baltic station (Estonian: Balti jaam) which is the main railway station of Tallinn. West of the station the railway line splits in two: The Keila–Turba railway line (until 2004 the Keila–Haapsalu railway line) continues to Turba, and the Keila–Paldiski railway line continues to Paldiski.

The station opened in 1870 as an intermediate station on the Saint Petersburg–Paldiski railway line which was completed in 1870. In 1905, the branch line from Keila to Paldiski opened, and Keila station became a railway junction. Currently, the station is served by Tallinn's commuter rail network, an electrified commuter rail network operated by Elron, linking the city of Tallinn with its suburbs and the surrounding countryside.

== See also ==
- List of railway stations in Estonia
- Rail transport in Estonia
