= Harku =

Borough in Estonia

- Small borough
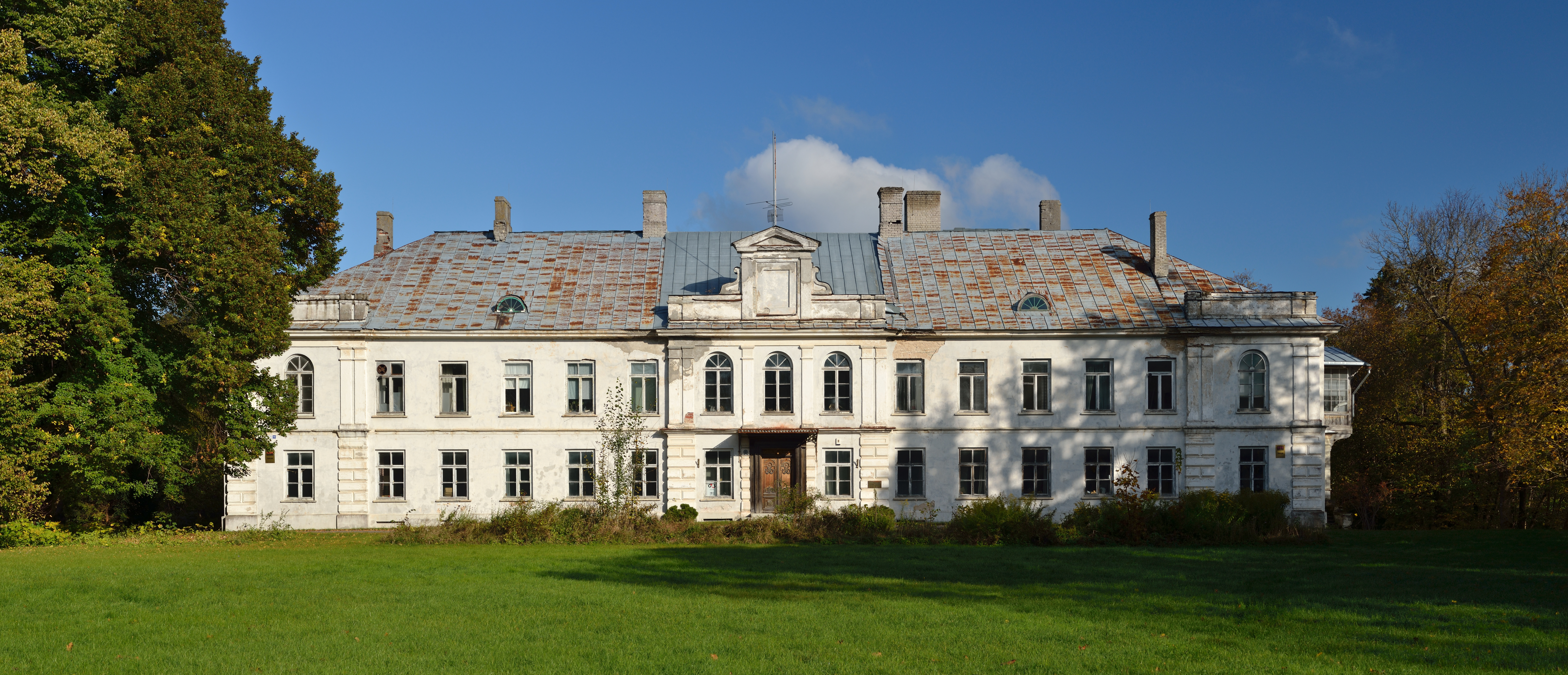
- Harku manor

- Location in Estonia
- Coordinates: 59°23′11″N 24°34′37″E
- Country: Estonia
- County: Harju County
- Municipality: Harku Parish
- First mentioned: 1242

Population (2011 Census)
  - Total: 868

Harku (German: Hark) is a small borough (Estonian: alevik) in Harku Parish, Harju County, northern Estonia. As of the 2011 census, the settlement's population was 868, of which the Estonians were 539 (62.1%).

Harku was first mentioned probably in 1242 as Harkua.

The only women's prison in Estonia Harku Prison is located in Harku. Politician Edgar Savisaar (1950–2022) was born in the prison.

== Harku manor ==
Harku manor (German: Hark) was founded in 1372 by the Teutonic Order. In 1583 it became a private property and was subsequently owned by several Baltic German families from the Baltic nobility. Following the Estonian Declaration of Independence, it was taken over by the state and used as a youth prison until the outbreak of World War II. Following the war the main building befell what is today known as the Estonian Agricultural University.

The main building that we see today dates from the 18th century and has been rebuilt several times. It received its present external look during a reconstruction in 1875.

The Capitulation of Estonia and Livonia during the Great Northern War was negotiated in the manor (1710).
