= Kulna =

Village in Estonia

- Village
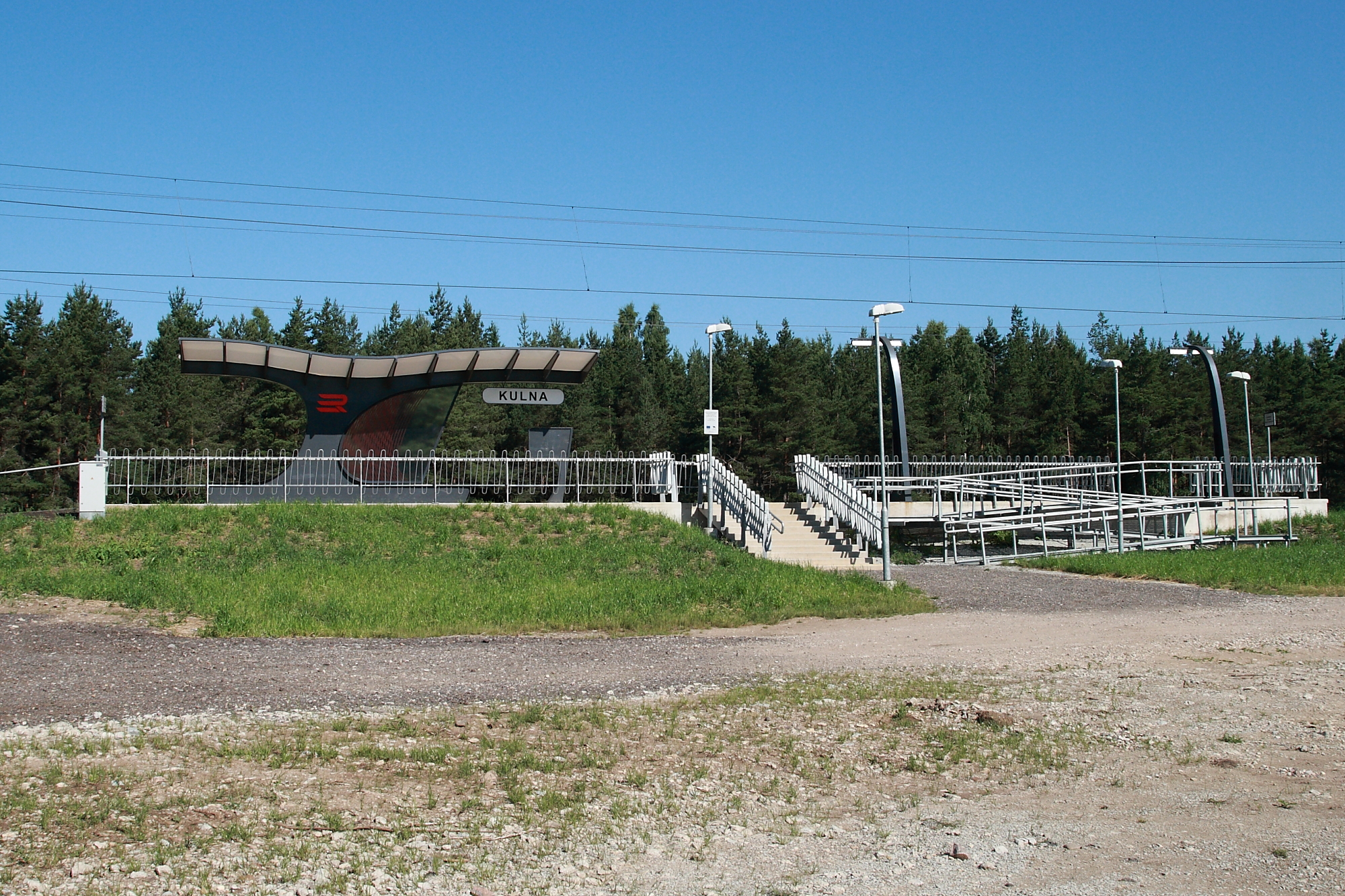
- Kulna railway station
- Interactive map of Kulna
- Coordinates: 59°18′09″N 24°22′48″E
- Country: Estonia
- County: Harju County
- Parish: Lääne-Harju Parish
- Time zone: UTC+2 (EET)
  - Summer (DST): UTC+3 (EEST)

Kulna is a village in Lääne-Harju Parish, Harju County in northern Estonia.

Kulna has a station on the Elron western route.

Preceding station	Elron	Following station
Keila towards Tallinn	Tallinn–Turba/Paldiski	Vasalemma towards Turba
