= Tutermaa =

Village in Estonia

- Village
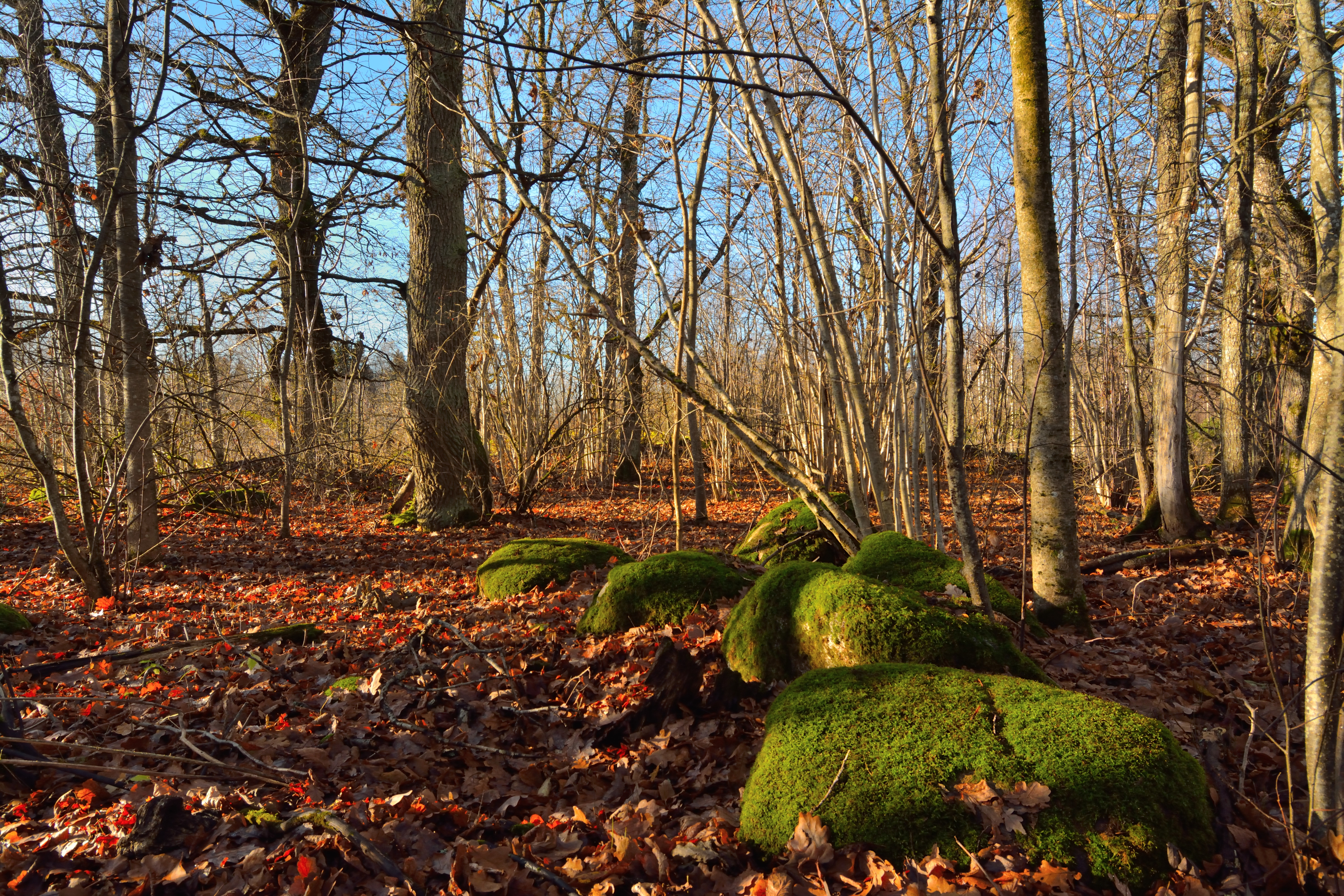

- Location in Estonia
- Coordinates: 59°19′31″N 24°28′20″E
- Country: Estonia
- County: Harju County
- Municipality: Harku Parish

Population (01.06.2010)
  - Total: 274

Tutermaa is a village in Harku Parish, Harju County in northern Estonia. It has a population of 274 (as of 1 June 2010).
