= Harku Manor =

Manor house in Estonia

Coordinates: 59°23′7″N 24°34′38″E

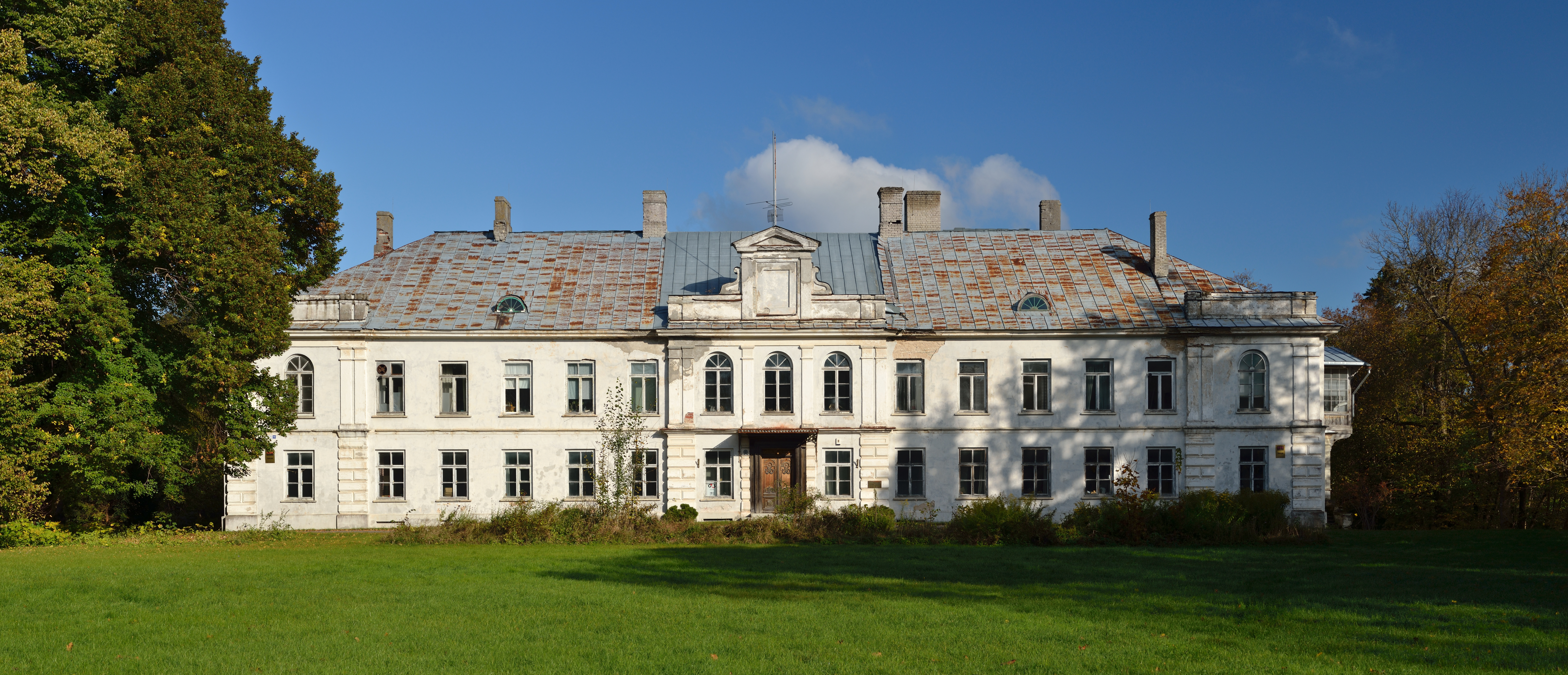
Harku manor main building

Harku manor (Estonian: Harku mõis, German: Hark) was a manor in Harjumaa, Estonia. According to current administrative borders it is located on Harku Parish in Harju County.

== History ==
The Building was first built as a small stronghold and only later became a manor. It was first mentioned in 1372, and belonged to the Livonian Order. In the Middle Ages the manor served as a residency for the centre of vice commandment of Tallinn. In 1679 the manor was acquired by the famous family of von Uexküll and by the 18th century they had started constructing the Baroque-styled main building.

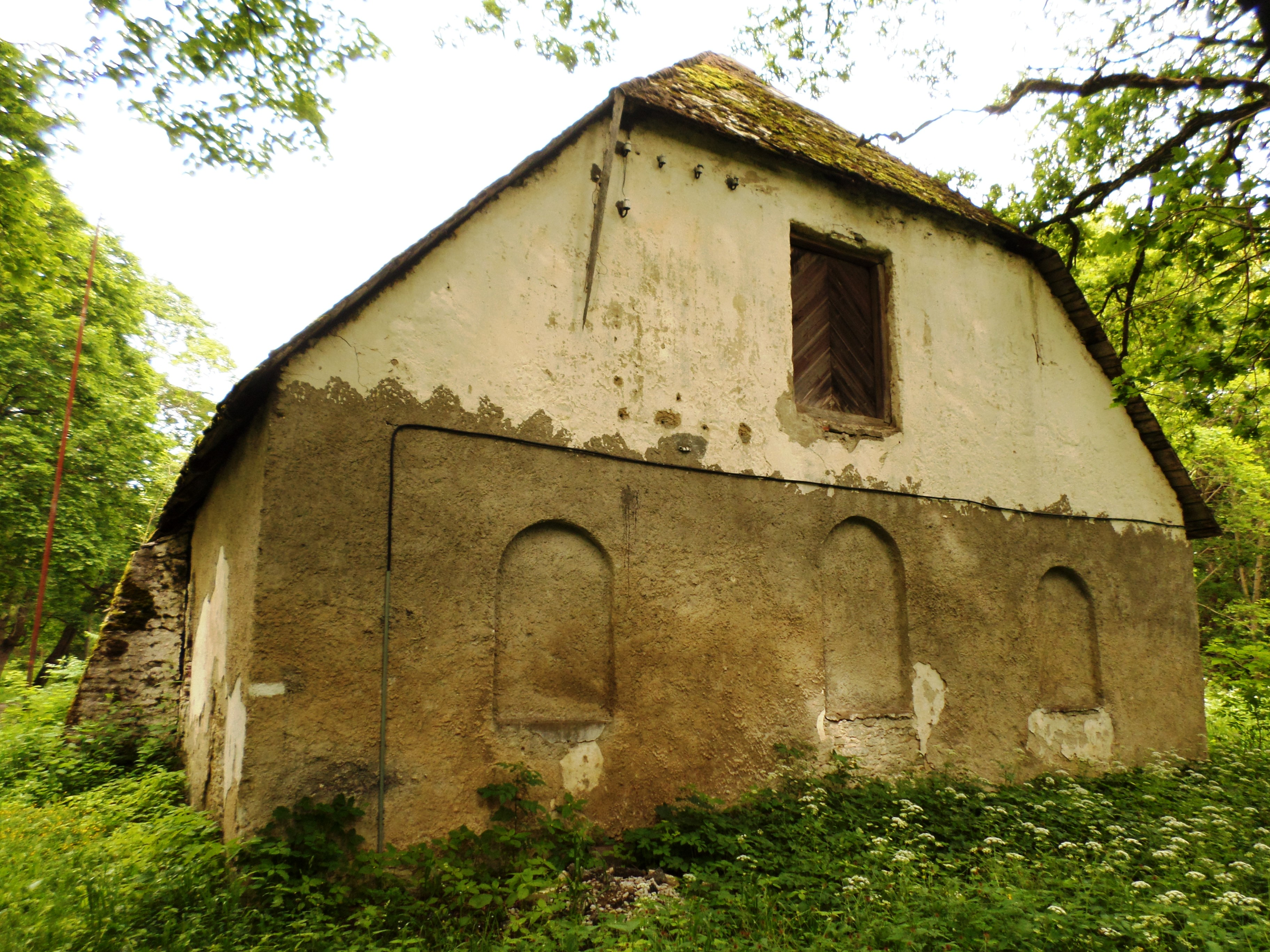
Harku manor granary

In September 1710 the half-finished Harku Manor was used as a place to sign the capitulation contract between Russian forces and Sweden with local nobility. The contract ended The Great Northern War. This laid the main foundation for the 18–19th century Baltic Special Agreements by which Estonia, going under the Russian reign for 200 years, retained its considerable autonomy and did not become a typical Russian province.

The von Budbergs, that acquired the manor in 1755, rebuilt the building into Early Classicism style. The Neo-Renaissance style look the manor has now was given by von Ungern-Sternbergs in 1875. The building was also made longer.

From 1892 the manor had many different owners and was bought by Hermann von Harpe in 1912 for 300 000 rubles. The same year von Harpe sold some of the property to 158 peasants. In 1919 the manor was expropriated from Hermann von Harpe.

In the 1920–1930s, right before the World War II, the building served many roles: rehabilitation facility for under aged criminals (so-called “Harku kolonn”); Harku prison for adults; Harku Work Camp for Work Despisers for drunks and work avoiders. Prisoners had to work in peat bogs and on manor fields. Working with livestock and crops provided extra food. Peat industry turned out to be especially beneficial because the government needed a lot of peat for heating. 1924 was the year of prisoners strike in Harku prison.

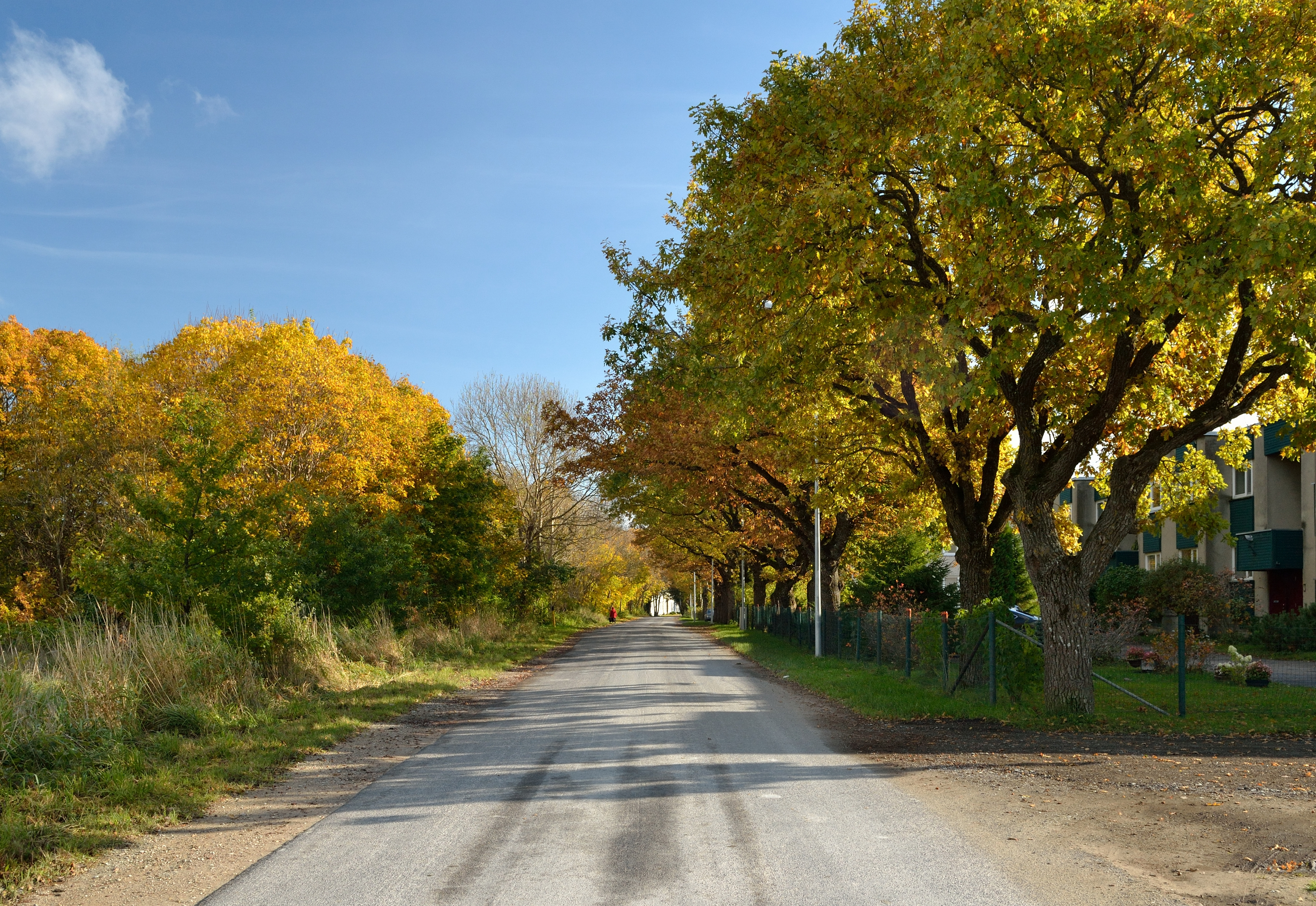
Harku manor avenue

From 1957 Harku Manor housed the Institute of Experimental Biology and was owned by Estonian Academy of Sciences and later Estonian University of Life Sciences.

Since 2014 Harku Manor is owned by Baula Arendus OÜ.

There are other outbuildings near the main building of Harku manor that make great sightseeing objects. For example, the historical cattle complex and the ruins of the two-towered greenhouse that looks like a medieval stronghold (both from the end of 19th century). Also, in the shade of trees, the barn and stables-coach shed are still standing, bordering the long front court of the main building. Many other outbuildings still remain, even though rebuilt in some ways.

There are two roads leading to the Tallinn-Keila highway, one towards Tallinn, the other towards Keila (Hüüru). At first, both roads were designed as 800 meters long decorated alleys.

Near the manor complex, the 20th century has added many new buildings, most of which are situated north-east and west from the old complex.

== Architecture ==
What makes Harku Manor valuable is its very versatile architectural history. The current manor house dates from the beginning of the 18th century. Two wings were added to the two-storey main building as part of the modernization works that took place in 1870.

The façade of the main building is decorated with slightly salient window-wide side avant-corps and with a central avant-corps that is three windows wide. All of these are adorned with double pilasters and historicist pediments. On the back side, the central avant-corps protrudes more noticeably from the facade and has a classicistic triangular pediment. All of the pediments have arched windows on the second floor. A small veranda is attached to the building on the right side.

Administrative buildings with high corbie-stepped gables made of limestone and a historicist abamurus with decorative towers, resembling a stronghold, are located near the entrance. In the vicinity are the ruins of an order castle, presumably from the 14th century.

Auxiliary buildings worth seeing include the cattle complex with historicist-style gables and the ruins of a greenhouse with two towers reminiscent of a medieval castle, located in the park (both from the end of the 19th century).

A granary and a stable-coach house lining the main building’s long front square have also been preserved, although they are currently hidden by the shadows of trees. The facades of both buildings are decorated with arches. Many other auxiliary buildings are also preserved, although several of them have been rebuilt.

== Sights ==
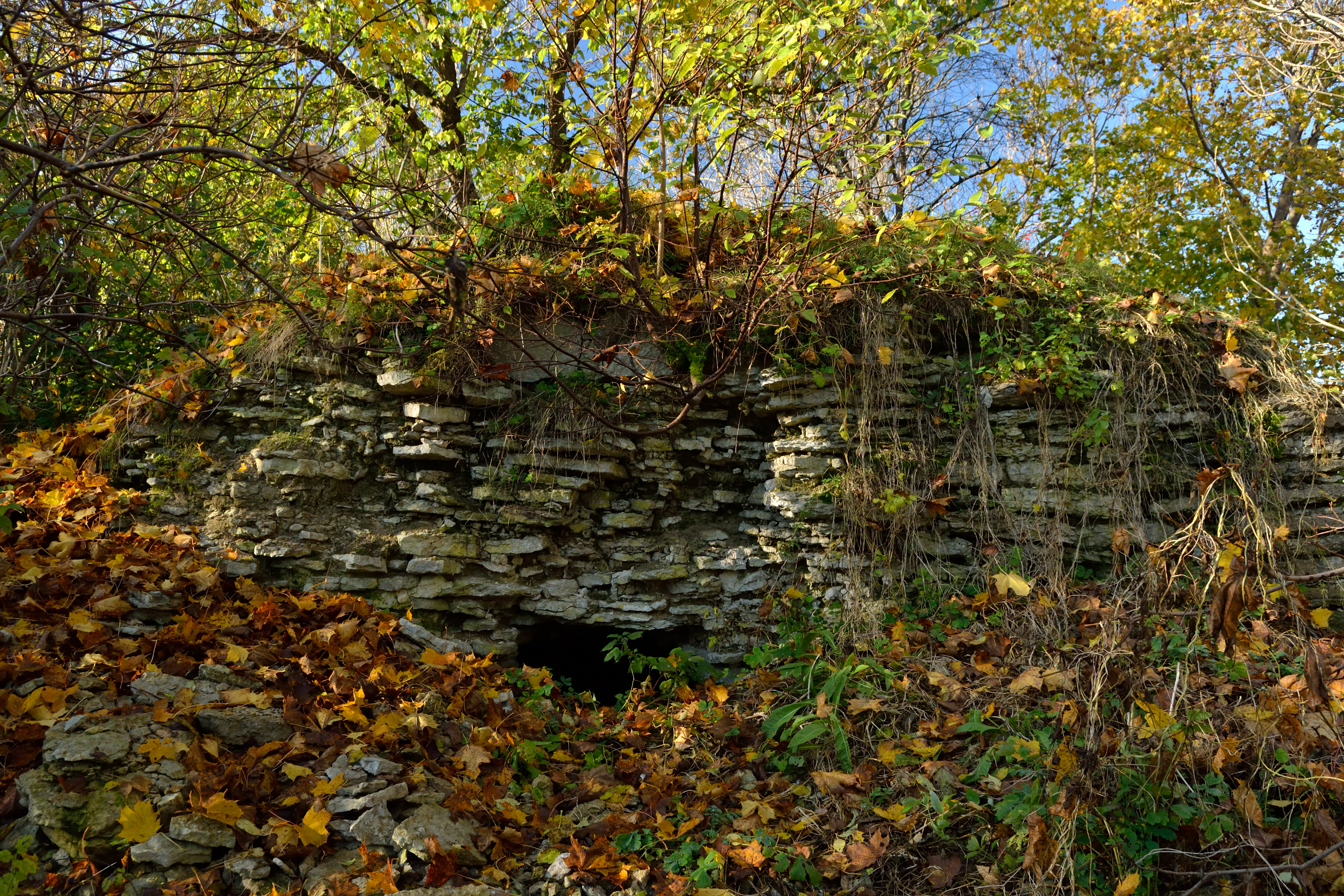
Remnants of a Harku order castle in the manor park

=== Park of the Harku Manor ===
The large 20-hectare park was initially designed in regular style. At that time, a patch of lawn surrounded by a roundabout stood in front of the façade of the main building and terraces descended from the garden facade to the ponds. In the main part, the park has been preserved in a more freely designed layout, which is illustrated by the loose placement of clearings and tree groups.

The long clearing southeast of the main building has been particularly well designed. The rear edge of the two hundred meter clearing has been decorated with broadleaf trees, and tree groups with crowns of different colors and shapes have been planted on the sides. Low blossoming shrubs grow next to those trees. The use of thick dark green fir-tree groups, i.e. the so-called coulisses, on the edge of the clearing adds even more depth to the clearing.

In the middle of the park there is a three-hectare large manor pond with five small islands and a limestone bottom. The pond originates from a relict lake. Peter Ludvig Constantin von Ungern-Sternberg had the lake reshaped into a pond in the 19th century. The soil that was left over from the widening and deepening of the lake was piled up in the middle of the pond to form five islands that were decorated with various sculptures and connected with bridges.

The pride of the Harku Manor Park is a sycamore tree that has borne the title of the widest tree in Estonia for more than 25 years. In 1976, each branch of the two-branched tree was two meters wide, but by the summer of 2004 one of the branches had broken and the girth of the other branch at chest height was 320 cm.

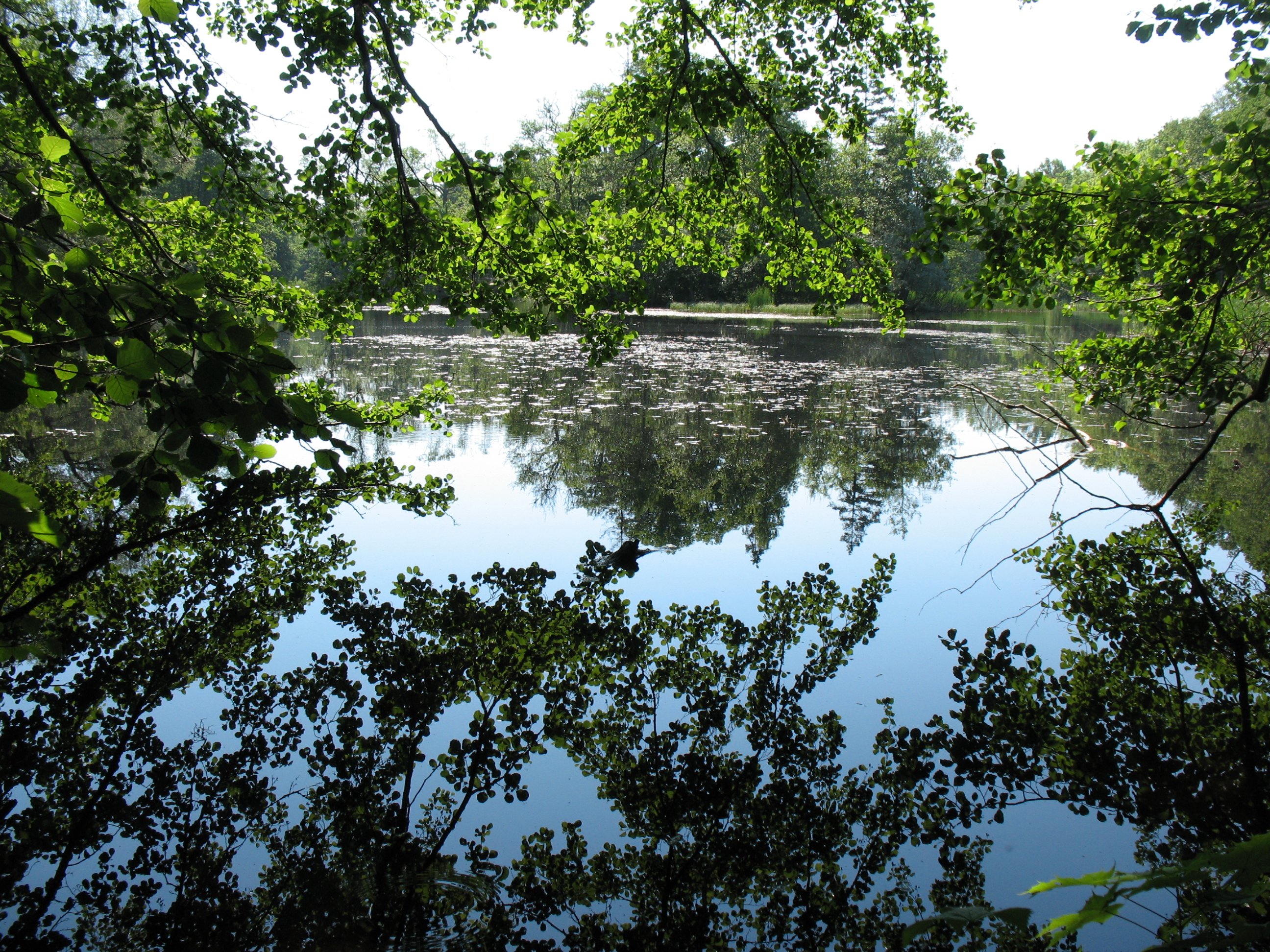

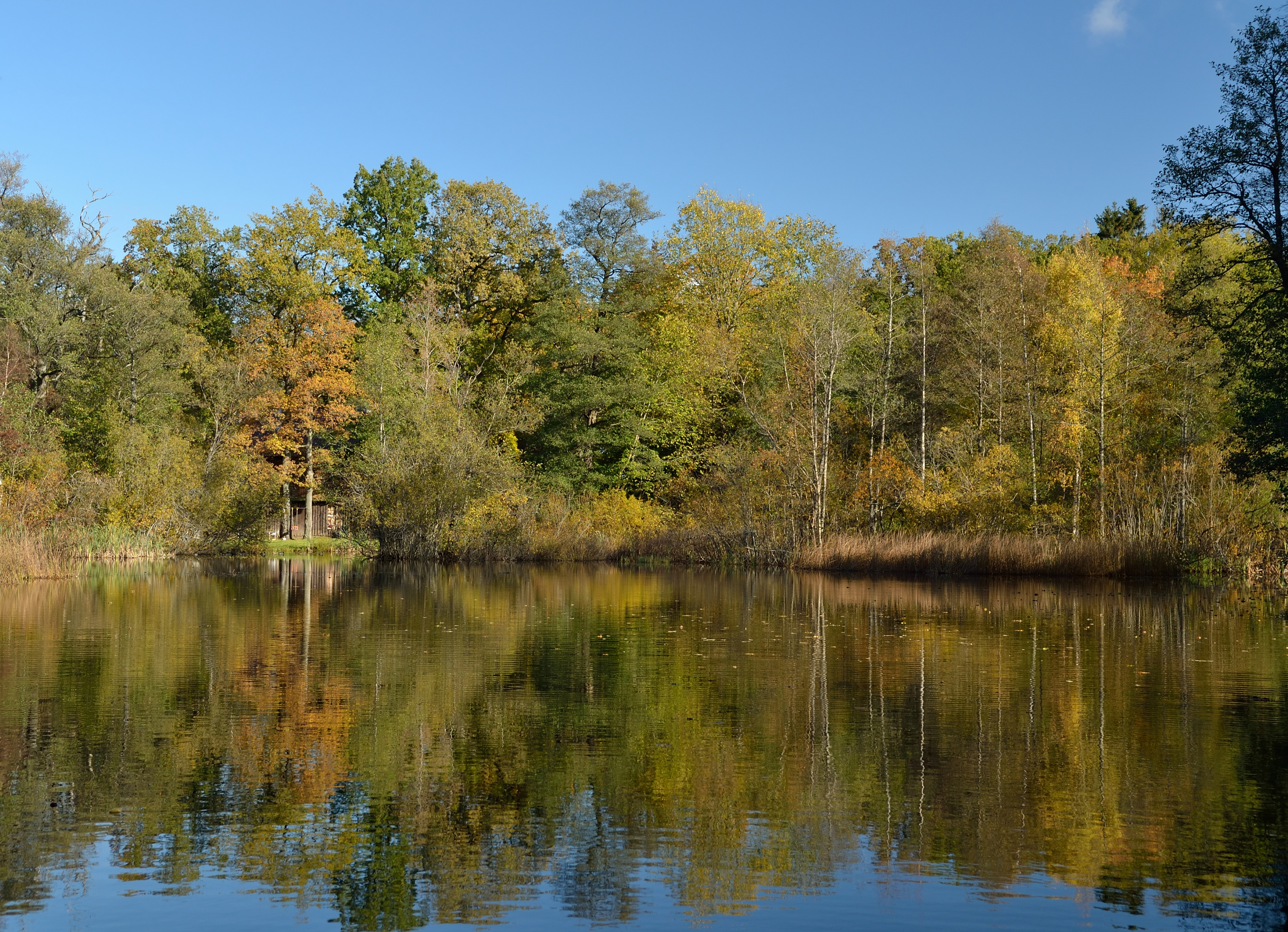

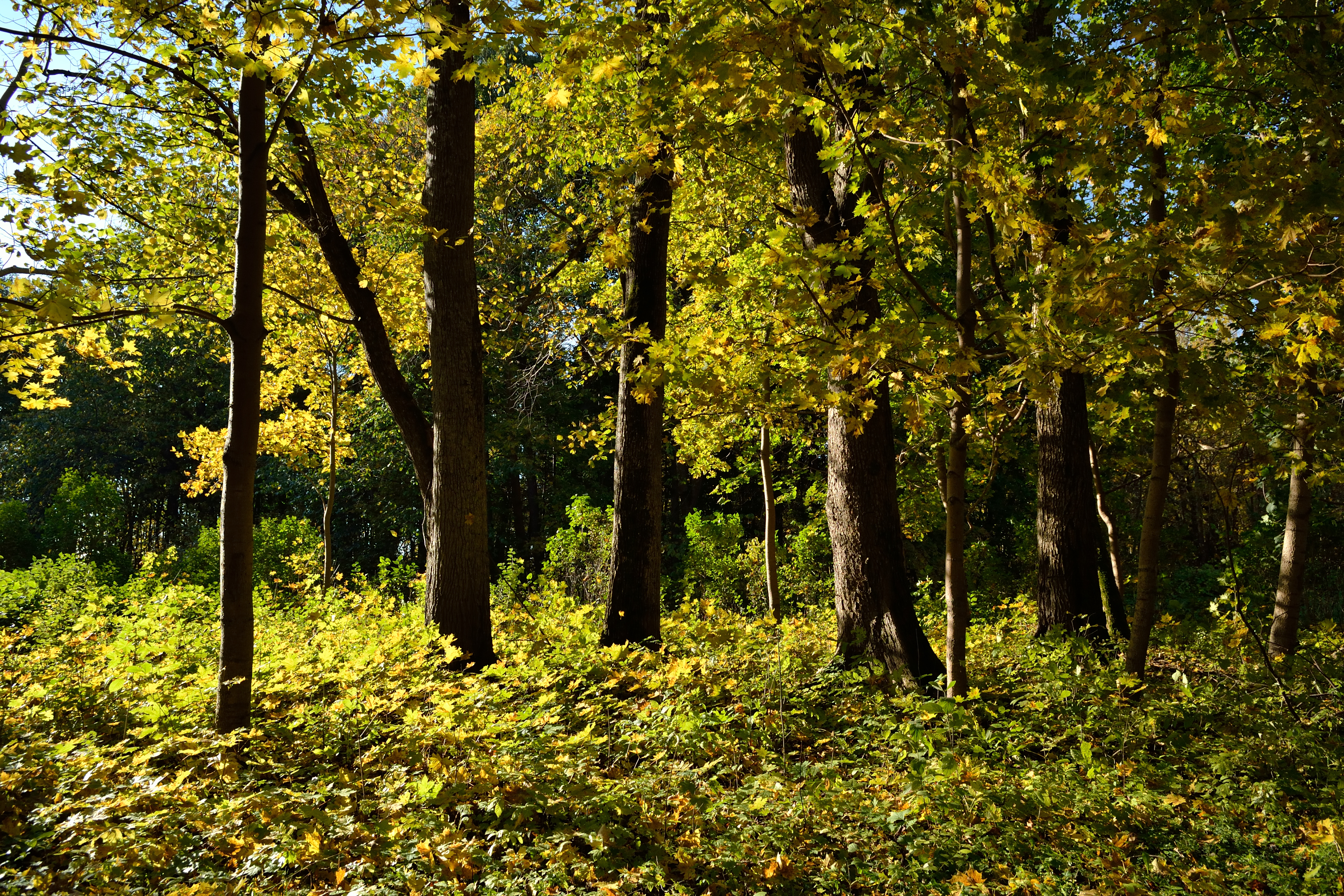

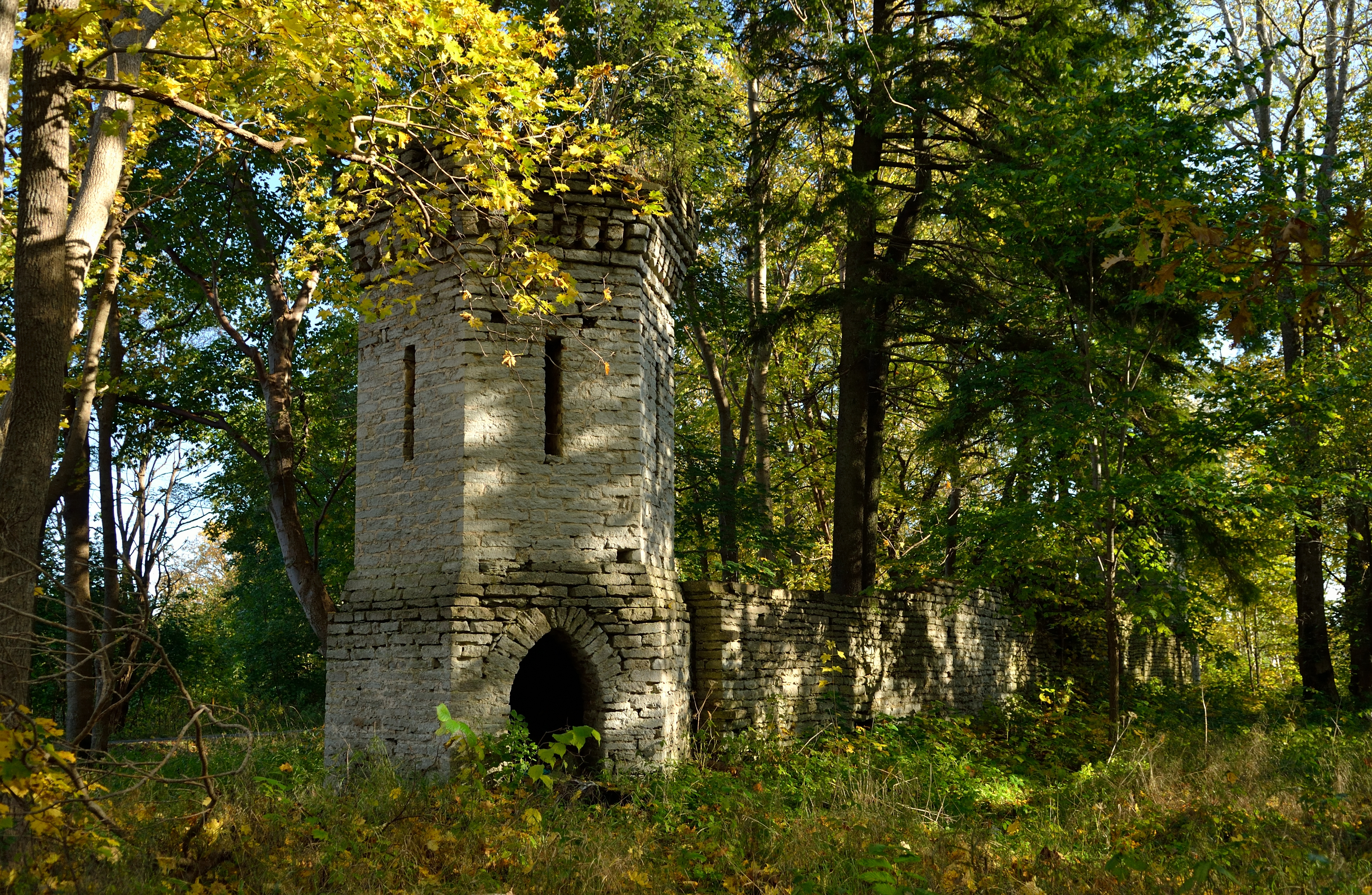
