= Lehola =

Village in Estonia

- Location within Estonia
- Coordinates: 59°17′33″N 24°18′41″E
- Country: Estonia
- County: Harju County

Population (1 January 2004)
  - Total: 486
- Time zone: UTC+2 (EET)

Lehola is a settlement in Lääne-Harju Parish, Harju County in northwestern Estonia. It had a population of 486 (as of 1 January 2004).
