= Ohtu =

Village in Estonia

Coordinates: 59°17′N 24°22′E

- Village
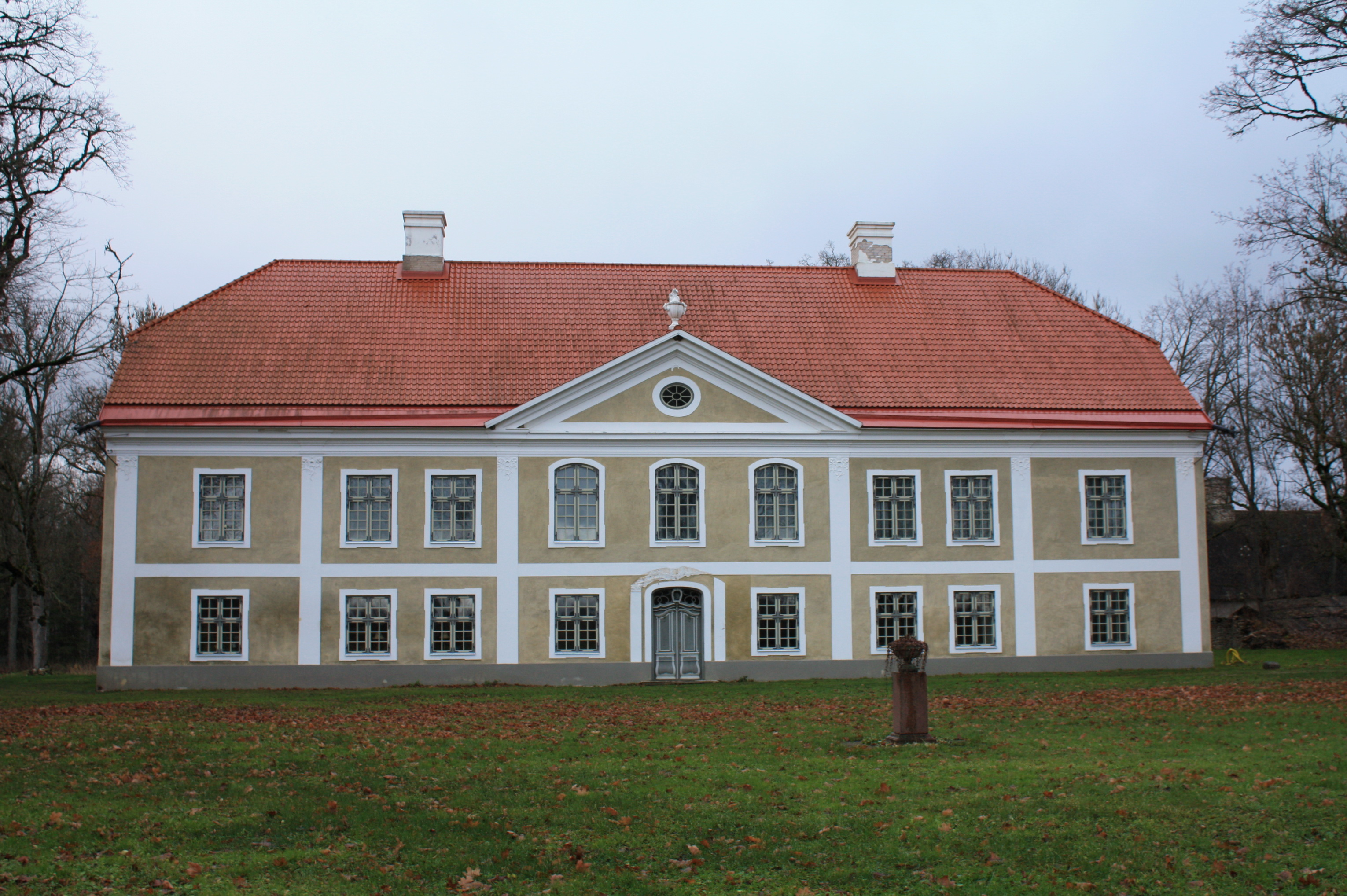
- Ohtu Manor
- Interactive map of Ohtu
- Country: Estonia
- County: Harju County
- Parish: Lääne-Harju Parish
- Time zone: UTC+2 (EET)
  - Summer (DST): UTC+3 (EEST)

Ohtu is a village in Lääne-Harju Parish, Harju County in northern Estonia.

== History ==
The Ohtu manor (German: Ocht) was originally built c. the 17th century. The manor received its current late baroque appearance in 1769. It has been speculated that the architect who worked on the manor was Johann Schultz. The manor was neglected and eventually abandoned during the 20th century, but it has been restored sometime between 2002 and 2004. Some details present in the first build, such as the rococo carved wooden main door and a fine sculpted ashlar fireplace from 1654 (possibly the work of Joachim Winter of Haapsalu), are preserved in the house.
