= Valkse =

Village in Estonia

- Village
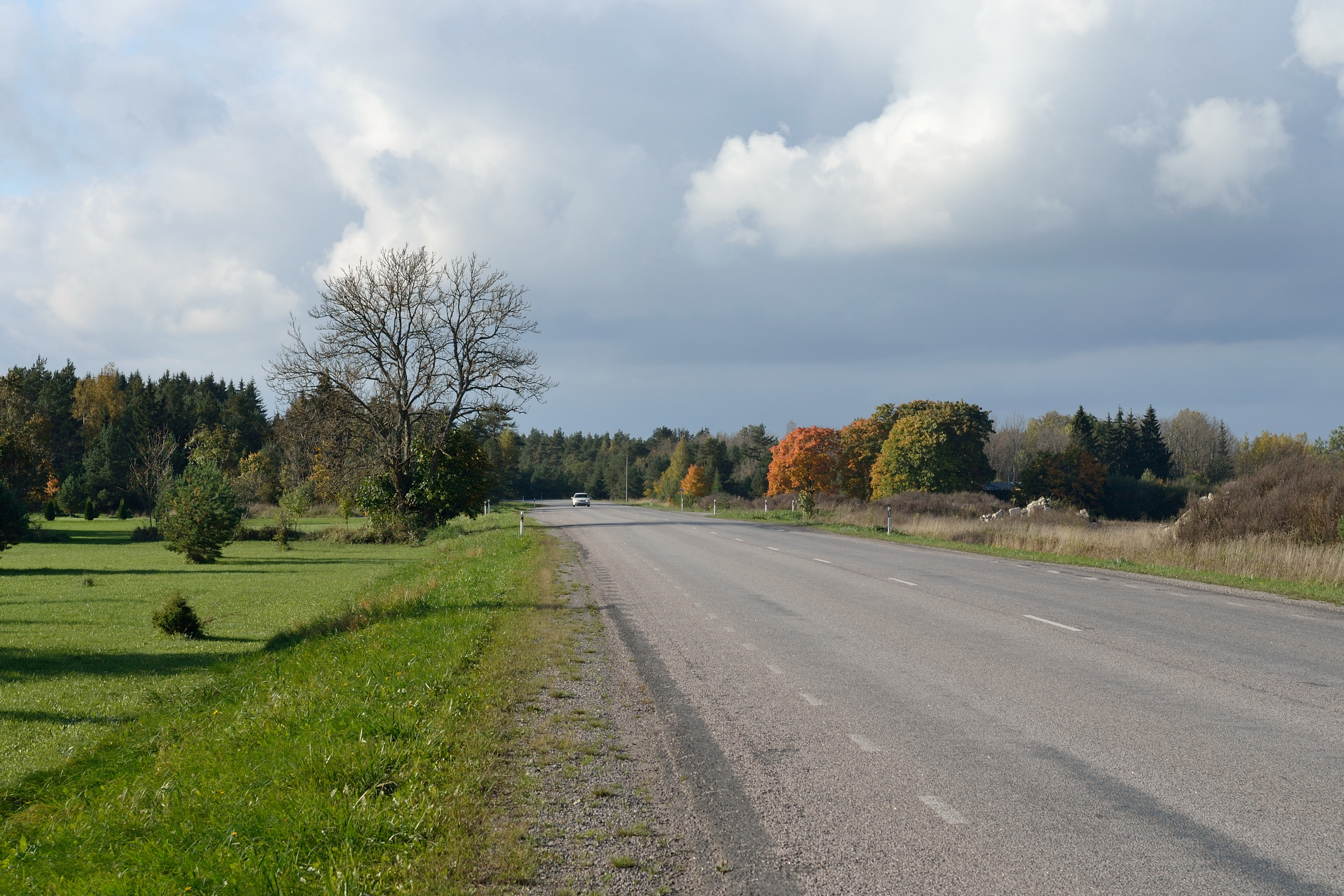
- Tallinn–Paldiski road (E265) in Valkse

- Location in Estonia
- Coordinates: 59°19′44″N 24°21′35″E
- Country: Estonia
- County: Harju County
- Municipality: Lääne-Harju Parish

Population (2011 Census)
  - Total: 138

Valkse is a village in Lääne-Harju Parish, Harju County in northwestern Estonia. As of the 2011 census, the settlement's population was 138.
