= Kiia, Estonia =

Village in Estonia

Kiia
- Village
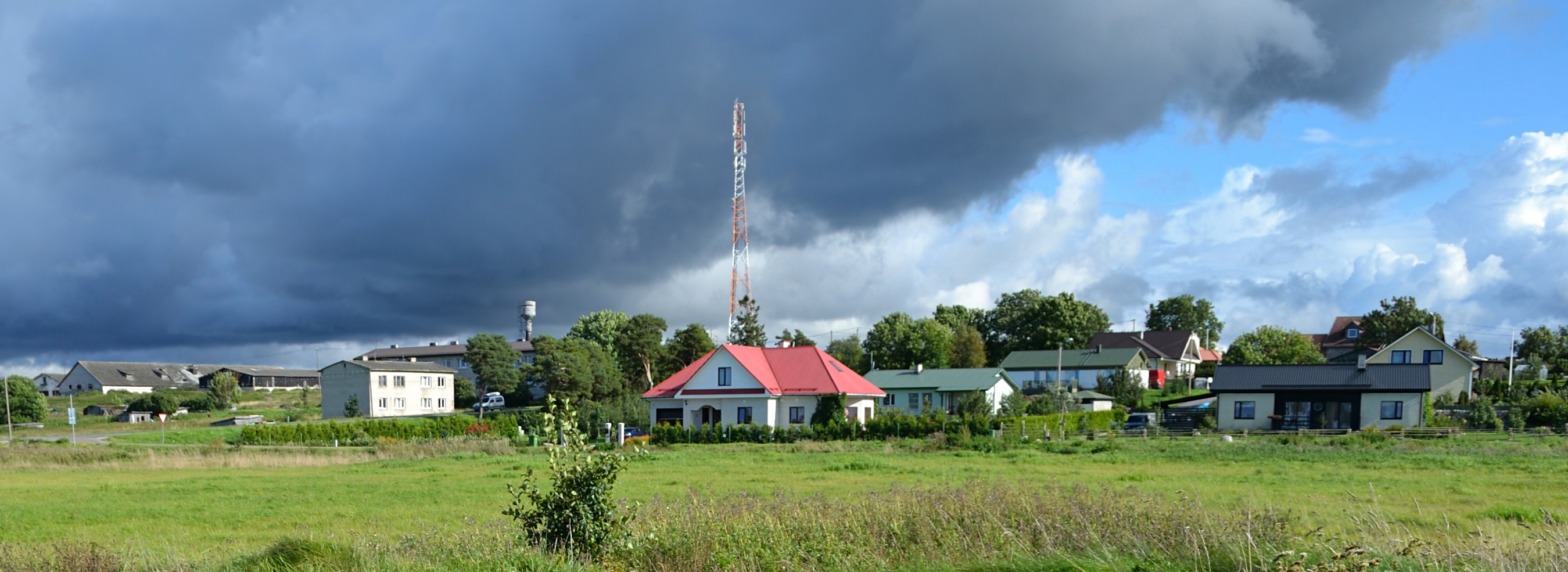
- Village of Kiia

- Location within Estonia
- Coordinates: 59°21′37″N 24°29′44″E
- Country: Estonia
- County: Harju County
- Parish: Saue Parish
- Time zone: UTC+2 (EET)
  - Summer (DST): UTC+3 (EEST)

Kiia is a village in Saue Parish, Harju County in northern Estonia.
