= European route E265 =

Road in trans-European E-road network

E265

Route information
- Length: 336 km (209 mi)
- Existed: 2008–present

Major junctions
- From: Tallinn (Estonia)
- To: Kapellskär (Sweden)

Location
- Countries: Estonia; Sweden
- Major cities: Tallinn; Keila; Paldiski; Kapellskär

Highway system
- International E-road network; A Class; B Class

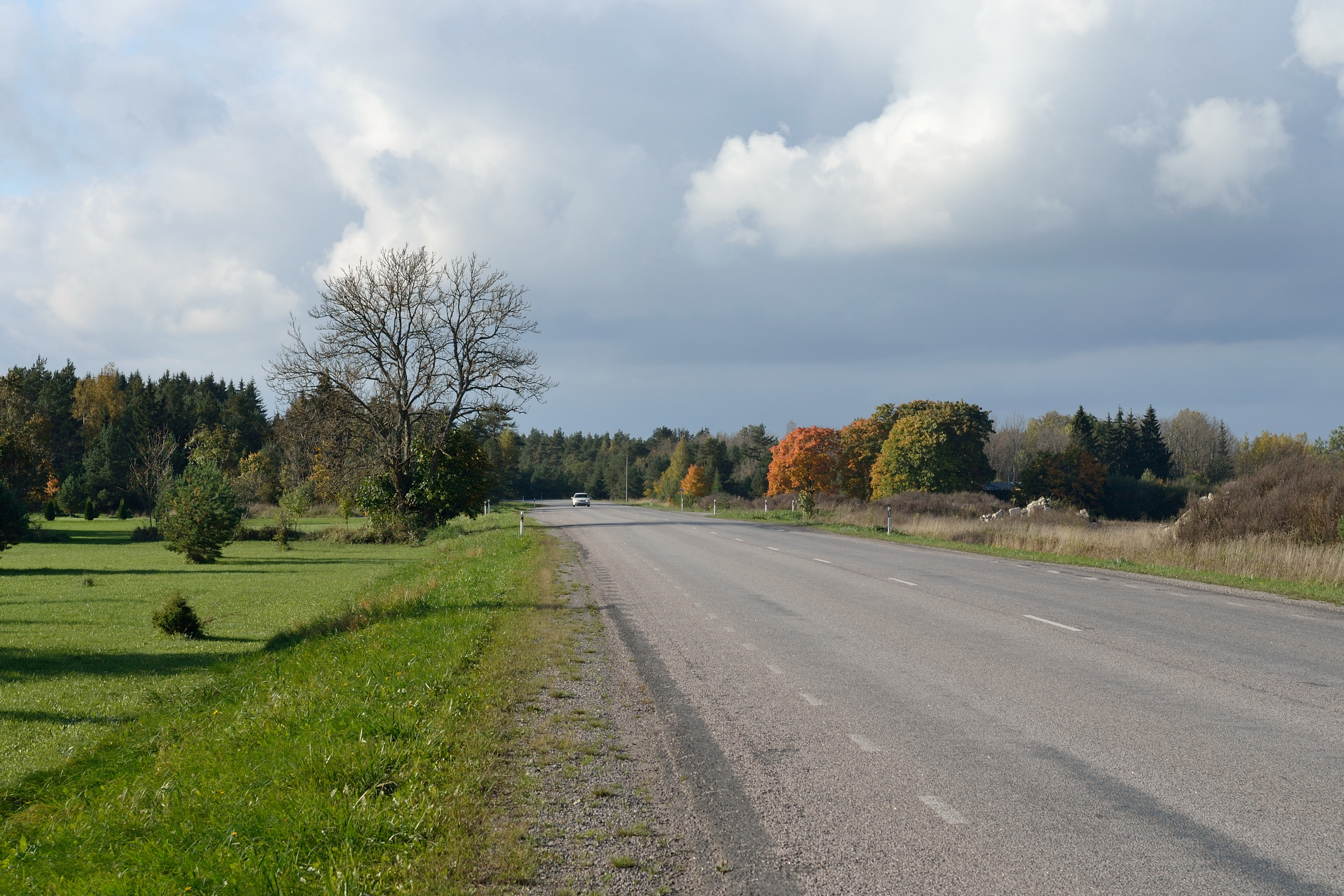
Road in Valkse village.

European route E265 is a B-class E-road, part of the inter-European road system. It runs through Estonia, connecting Tallinn to Paldiski, and from Paldiski has ferry access to the port of Kapellskär, Sweden. In Estonia, E265 follows the Estonian National Road 11 (Tallinn Ring Road) and part of Estonian National Road 8 (from Keila to Paldiski).
