= Niitvälja =

Village in Estonia

Coordinates: 59°18′57″N 24°19′12″E

- Village
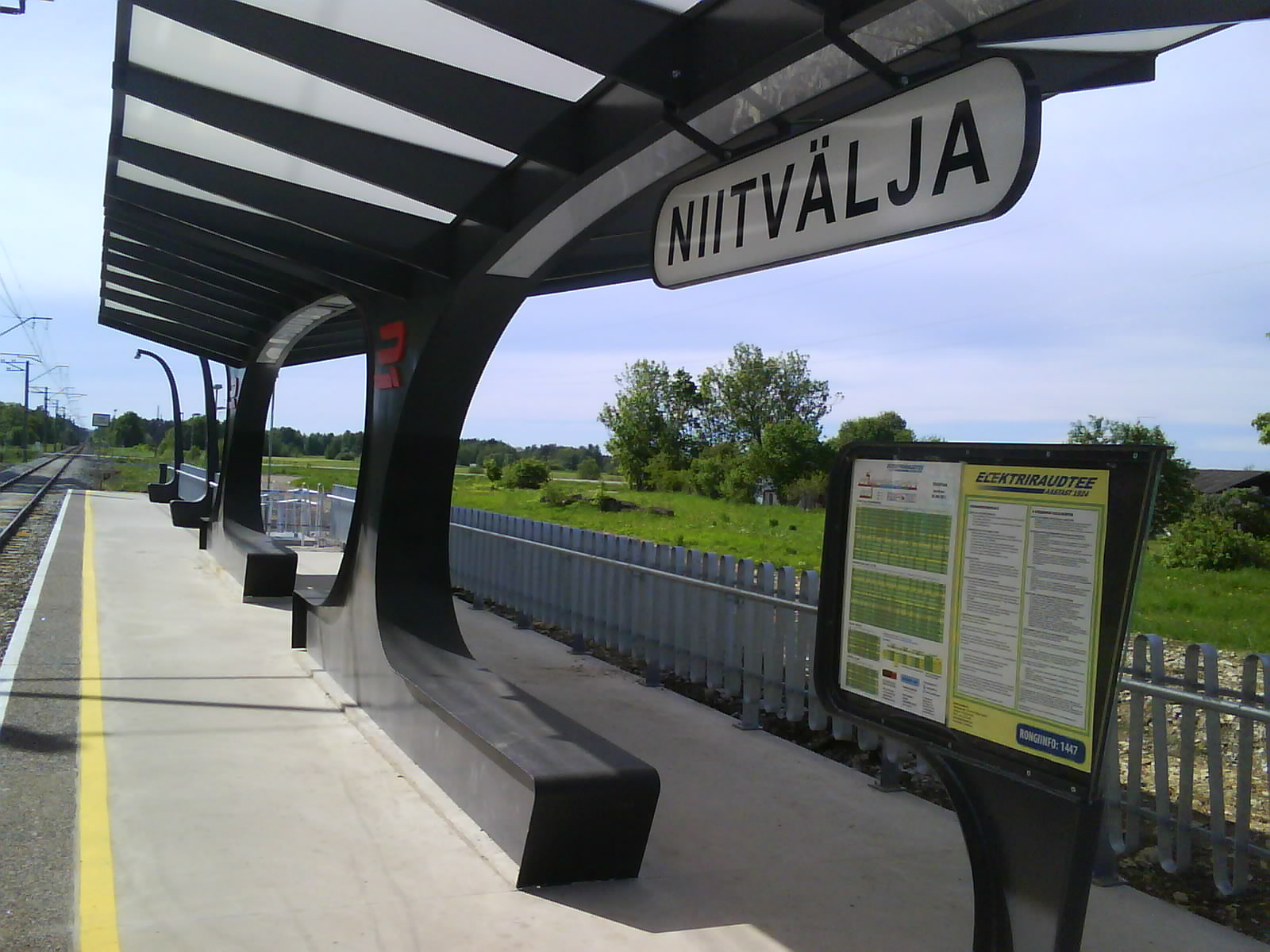
- Niitvälja railway station
- Interactive map of Niitvälja
- Country: Estonia
- County: Harju County
- Parish: Lääne-Harju Parish
- Time zone: UTC+2 (EET)
  - Summer (DST): UTC+3 (EEST)

Niitvälja is a village in Lääne-Harju Parish, Harju County in northern Estonia.

The Baltic's first 18-hole golf course is located in Niitvälja.

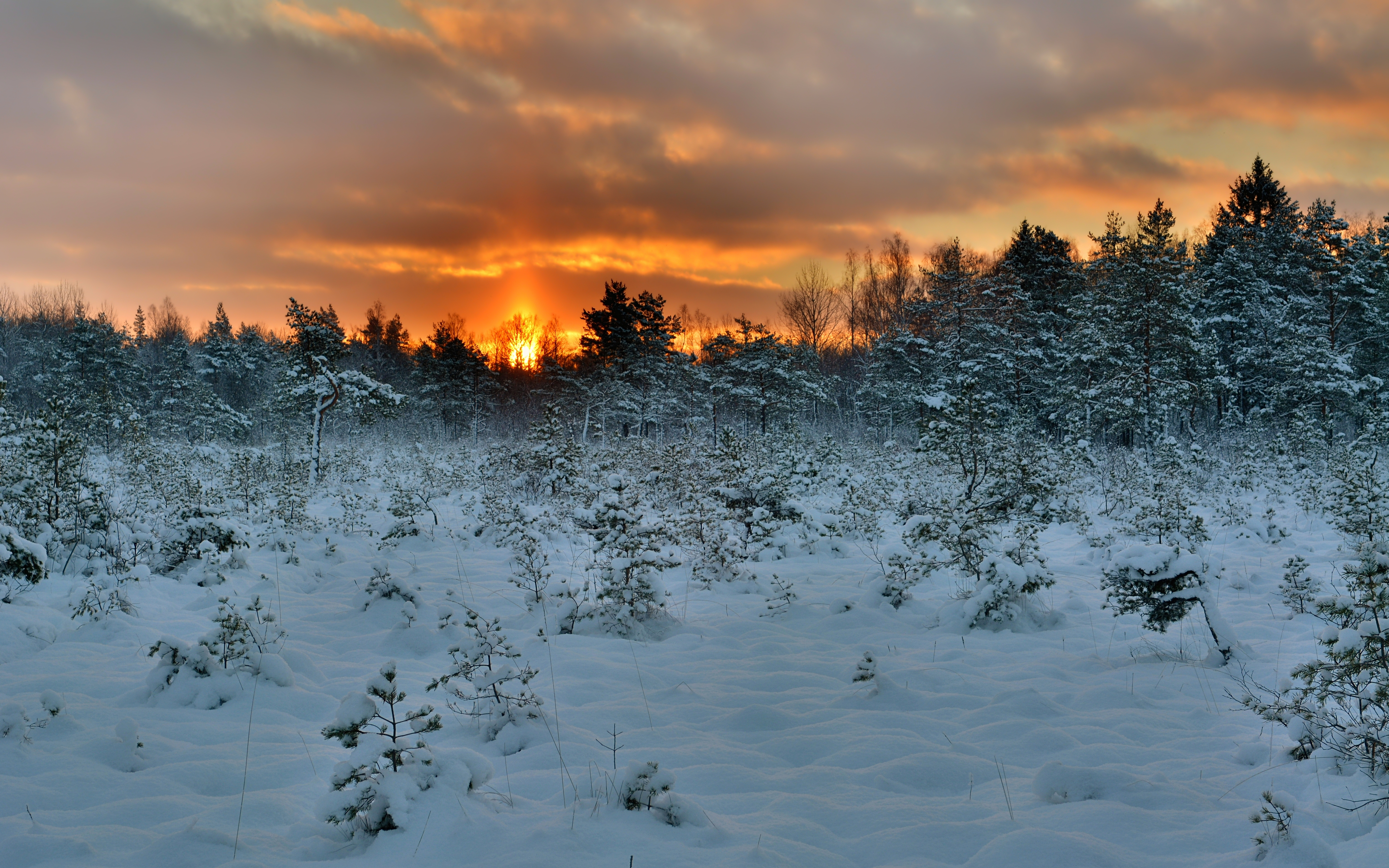
Niitvälja Bog

Preceding station	Elron	Following station
Keila towards Tallinn	Tallinn–Turba/Paldiski	Klooga towards Paldiski
