= Maidla =

Maidla may refer to several places in Estonia:

- Maidla, Ida-Viru County, village in Lüganuse Parish, Ida-Viru County
  - Maidla Parish, former municipality in Ida-Viru County
- Maidla, Harju County, village in Saue Parish, Harju County
- Maidla, Rapla Parish, village in Rapla Parish, Rapla County
- Maidla, Märjamaa Parish, village in Märjamaa Parish, Rapla County

== See also ==
- Madila, village in Saue Parish, Harju County
