= Pallu =

Pallu or Pällu may refer to:

== People ==
- Pallu (biblical figure), a son of Reuben
- Pallu Reddanna, Indian scientist
- François Pallu (1626–1684), French bishop
- Georges Pallu (1869–1948), French screenwriter and film director

== Places ==
- Pällu, Harju County, a village in Saue Parish, Harju County, Estonia
- Pällu, Jõgeva County, a village in Mustvee Parish, Jõgeva County, Estonia
- La Pallu, a commune in Mayenne, France

== Other ==
- Pallu (poetry), a genre of Tamil poetry
- Pallu, the loose end of a sari
