= Valgejärv Landscape Conservation Area =

Protected area in Estonia

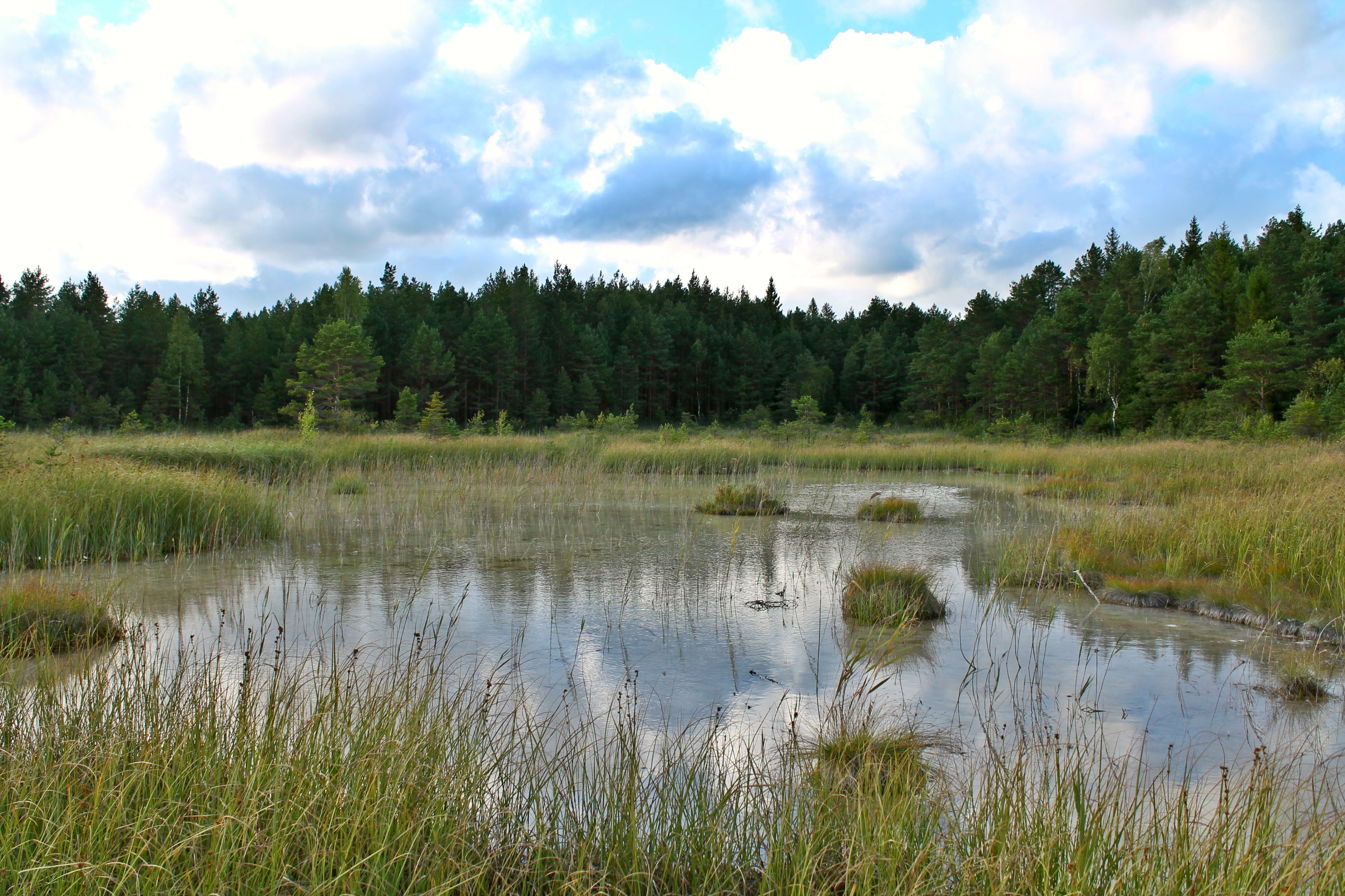

- Location within Estonia
- Location: Estonia
- Coordinates: 59°07′N 24°08′E
- Area: 723 ha (1,790 acres)
- Established: 1981 (2005)

Valgejärv Landscape Conservation Area (Estonian: Valgejärve maastikukaitseala) is a nature park in Harju County, Estonia, near the village of Siimika.

Its area is 723 ha.

The protected area was designated in 1981 to protect Riisipere Valgejärv and its surrounding areas. In 2005, the protected area was recategorized to a landscape conservation area.
