= Saue Parish =

Municipality of Estonia (2017)

Coordinates: 59.35°N 24.6°E

Saue Parish Saue vald
- Municipality of Estonia
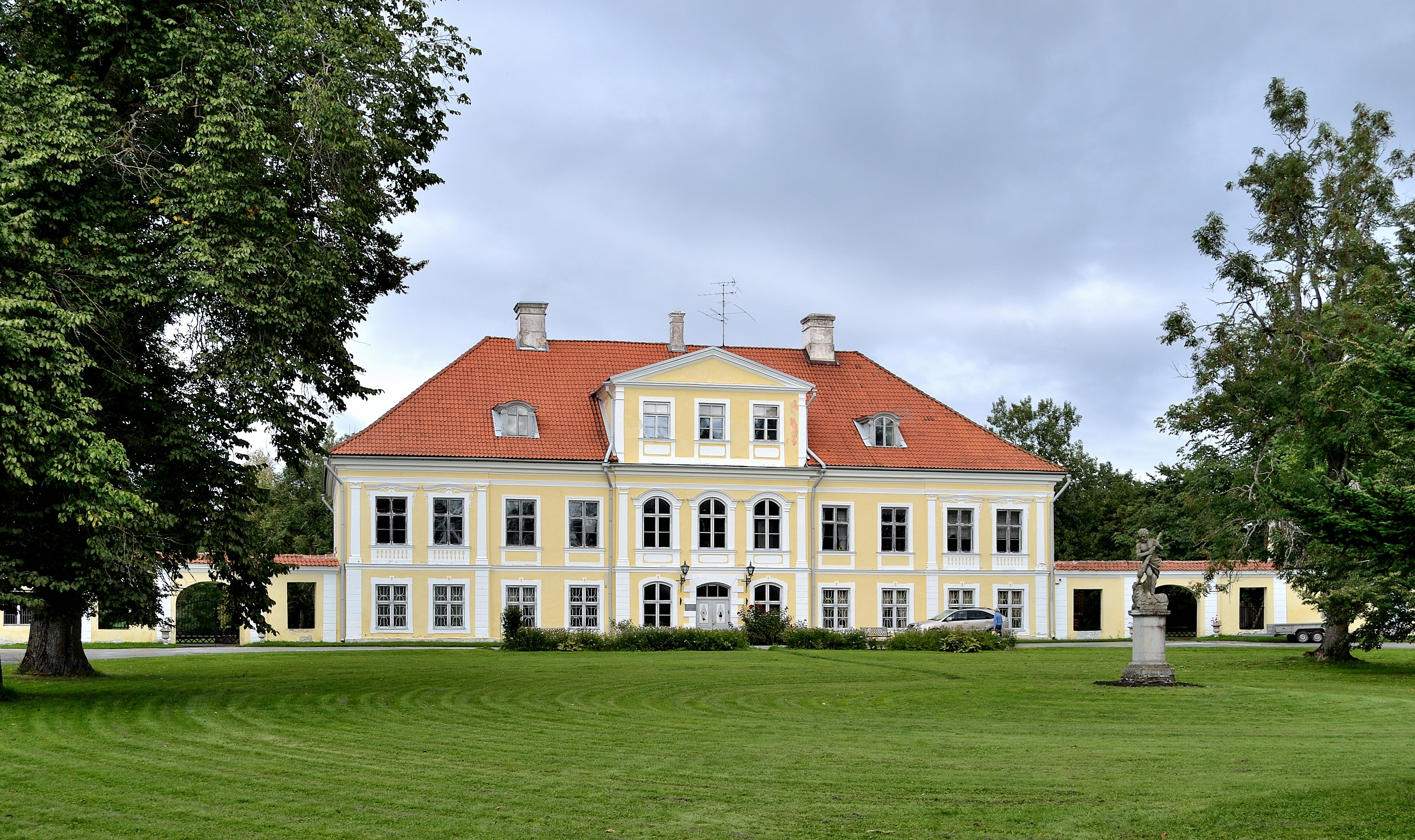
- Saue Manor

- Flag Coat of arms

- Saue Parish within Harju County
- Country: Estonia
- County: Harju County
- Administrative centre: Saue

Government
  - Mayor: Andres Laisk

Area
  - Total: 628 km^{2} (242 sq mi)

Population (2019)
  - Total: 22,050
  - Density: 35.1/km^{2} (90.9/sq mi)
- ISO 3166 code: EE-726
- Website: www.sauevald.ee

Saue Parish (Estonian: Saue vald) is a rural municipality in Harju County, north-western Estonia.

The administrative centre of Saue Parish is Saue. It is situated in the suburban area of Estonia's capital, Tallinn.

After the administrative reform of Estonia in 2017, the historical Saue Parish was merged into new Saue Parish (together with Saue, Kernu and Nissi), retaining its name.

== History ==
It was established in 1918, and re-established in 2017.

== Religion ==
According to the census, 9.9 per cent of the population in the municipality aged at least fifteen identified themselves as Lutherans, 3.5 per cent as Orthodox, 2.6 per cent as others Christians. 1.8 per cent of respondents said they followed other religions or their affiliation was unknown. 82.2 per cent of the residents were religiously unaffiliated.

== Geography ==
=== Populated places ===
There is one town Saue and three small boroughs (est: alevik) and several villages (est: külad, sg. küla) in Saue Parish.

Town: Saue

Small boroughs: Laagri - Riisipere - Turba

Villages: Ääsmäe - Aila - Allika - Alliku - Aude - Ellamaa - Haiba - Hüüru - Hingu - Jaanika - Jõgisoo - Kaasiku - Kabila - Kernu - Kibuna - Kiia - Kirikla - Kivitammi - Kohatu - Koidu - Koppelmaa - Kustja - Laitse - Lehetu - Lepaste - Madila - Maidla - Metsanurga - Mõnuste - Munalaskme - Mustu - Muusika - Nurme - Odulemma - Pällu - Pärinurme - Pohla - Püha - Ruila - Siimika - Tabara - Tagametsa - Tuula - Ürjaste - Valingu - Vanamõisa - Vansi - Vatsla - Vilumäe - Viruküla

== Notable people ==
- Gustav Adolf Hippius (1792 in Nissi - 1856), a Baltic German portrait painter and lithographer.
- Raimond Valgre (1913 in Riisipere – 1949), a popular composer and musician
- Tiit Kändler (born 1948 in Turba), humorist, publicist and science journalist.
- Kaire Kimsen (born 1978 in Saue), former footballer who played 17 games for Estonia women
- Ingemar Teever (born 1983 in Saue), former footballer who played over 480 games and 30 for Estonia
