= Puha =

Puha or Püha may refer to:

- Puha, New Zealand, a locality
- Püha, Harju County, village in Saue Parish, Harju County, Estonia
- Püha, Saare County, village in Pihtla Parish, Saare County, Estonia
- Puha (gastropod), genus of extinct sea snails
- Sonchus, genus of plants (sow thistles)
