= Nissi Parish =

Former municipality of Estonia

Coordinates: 59°7′14″N 24°18′33″E

Nissi Parish Nissi vald
- Former municipality of Estonia
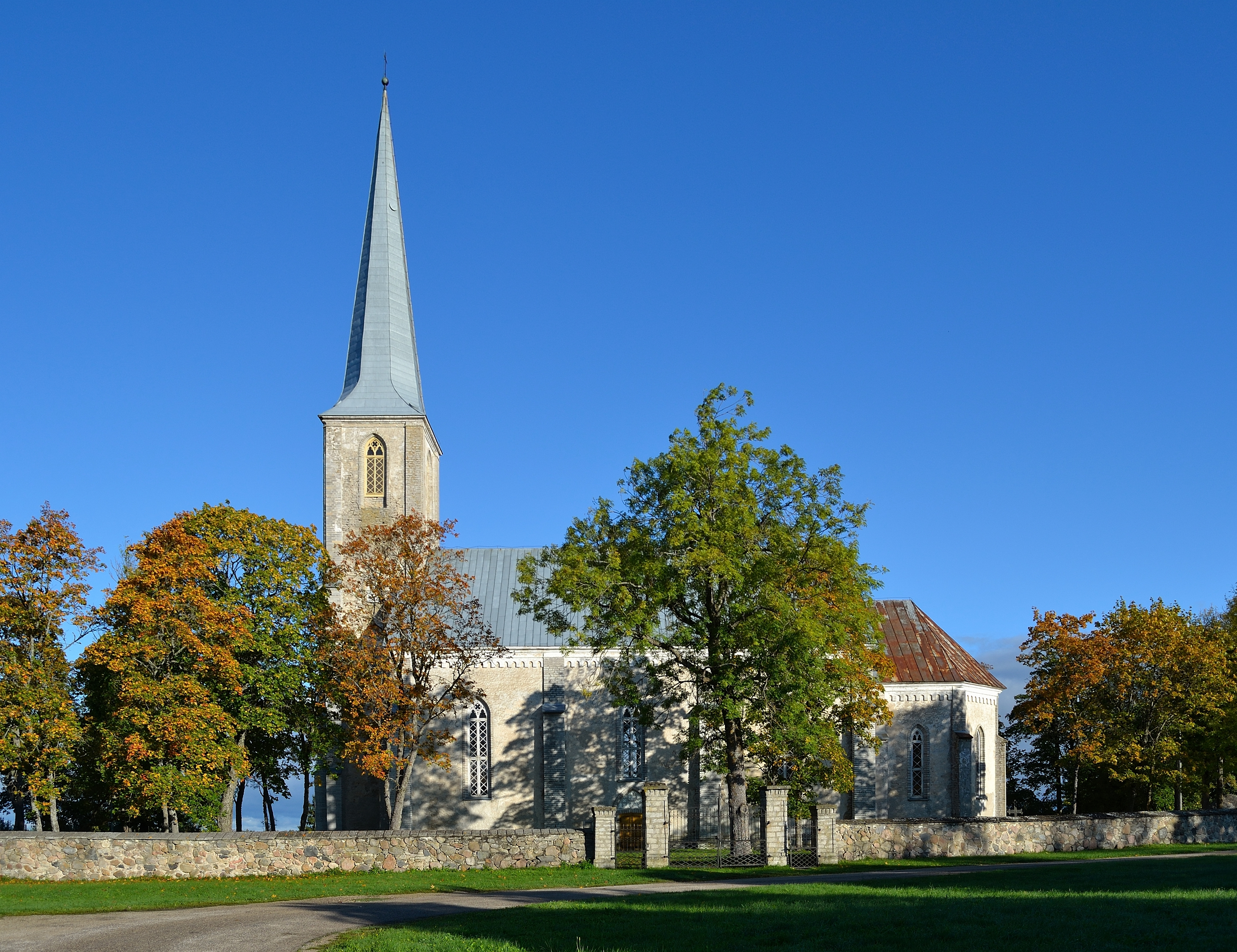
- Nissi church

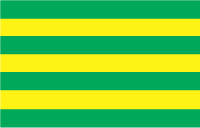
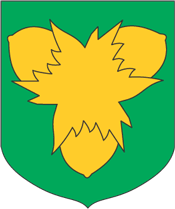
- Flag Coat of arms

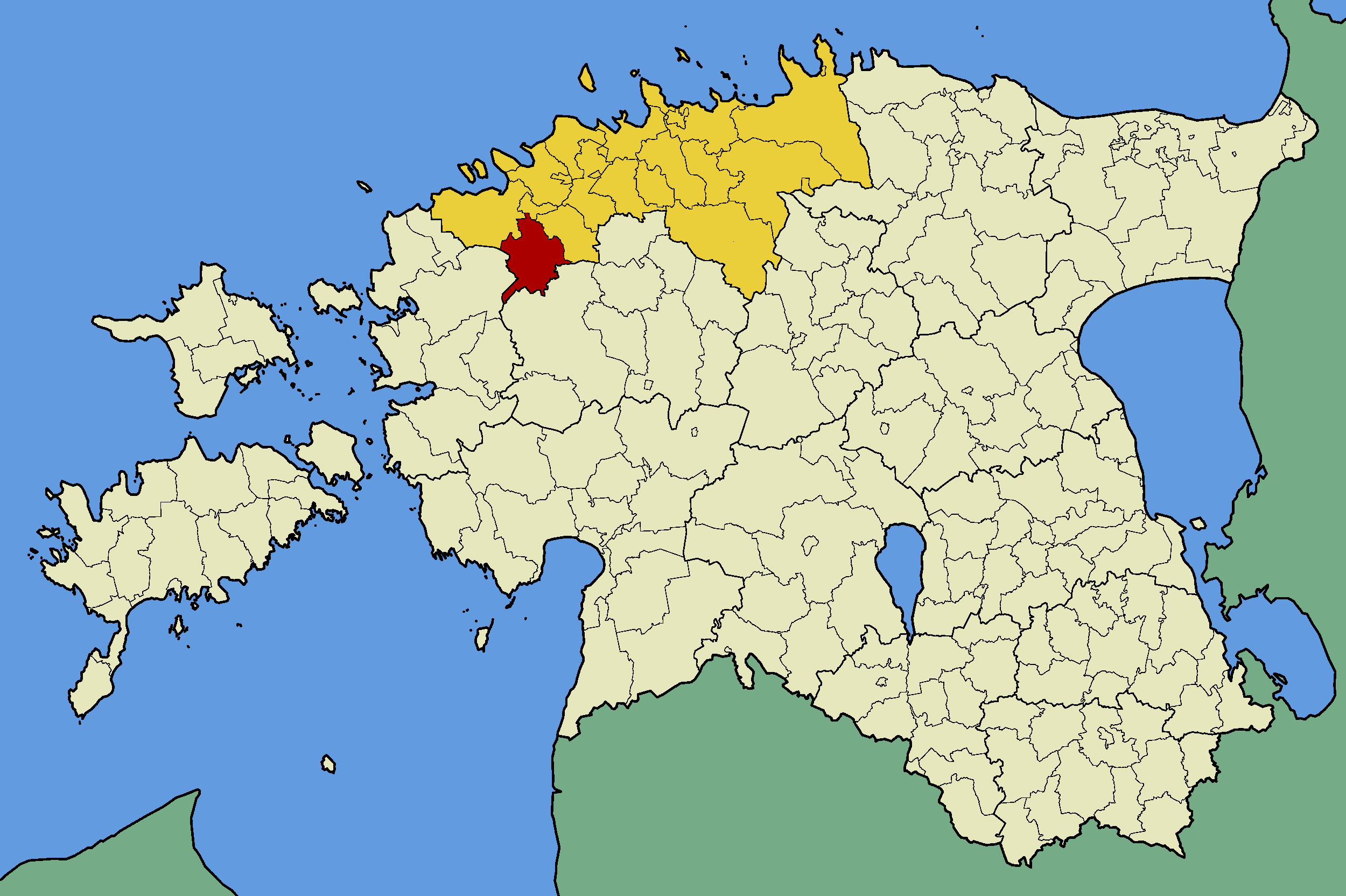
- Nissi Parish within Harju County
- Country: Estonia
- County: Harju County
- Administrative centre: Riisipere

Government
  - Mayor: Ermil Miggur

Area
  - Total: 264.9 km^{2} (102.3 sq mi)

Population (01.01.2007)
  - Total: 3,281
  - Density: 12.39/km^{2} (32.08/sq mi)
- Website: www.nissi.ee

Nissi Parish (Estonian: Nissi vald) was a rural municipality in northern Estonia. It was a part of Harju County. The municipality had a population of 3,281 (as of 1 January 2007) and covered an area of 264.9 km^{2} (102.3 sq mi). The population density is 12.386/km^{2} (32.079/sq mi). The current mayor (vallavanem) is Peedo Kessel.

Administrative centre of the municipality was Riisipere small borough (alevik). There was also Turba small borough and 17 villages in Nissi Parish: Aude, Ellamaa, Jaanika, Kivitammi, Lehetu, Lepaste, Madila, Munalaskme, Mustu, Nurme, Odulemma, Rehemäe, Siimika, Tabara, Ürjaste, Vilumäe, and Viruküla.
