= Nurme, Harju County =

Village in Estonia

Coordinates: 59°04′33″N 24°20′14″E

Nurme
- Village
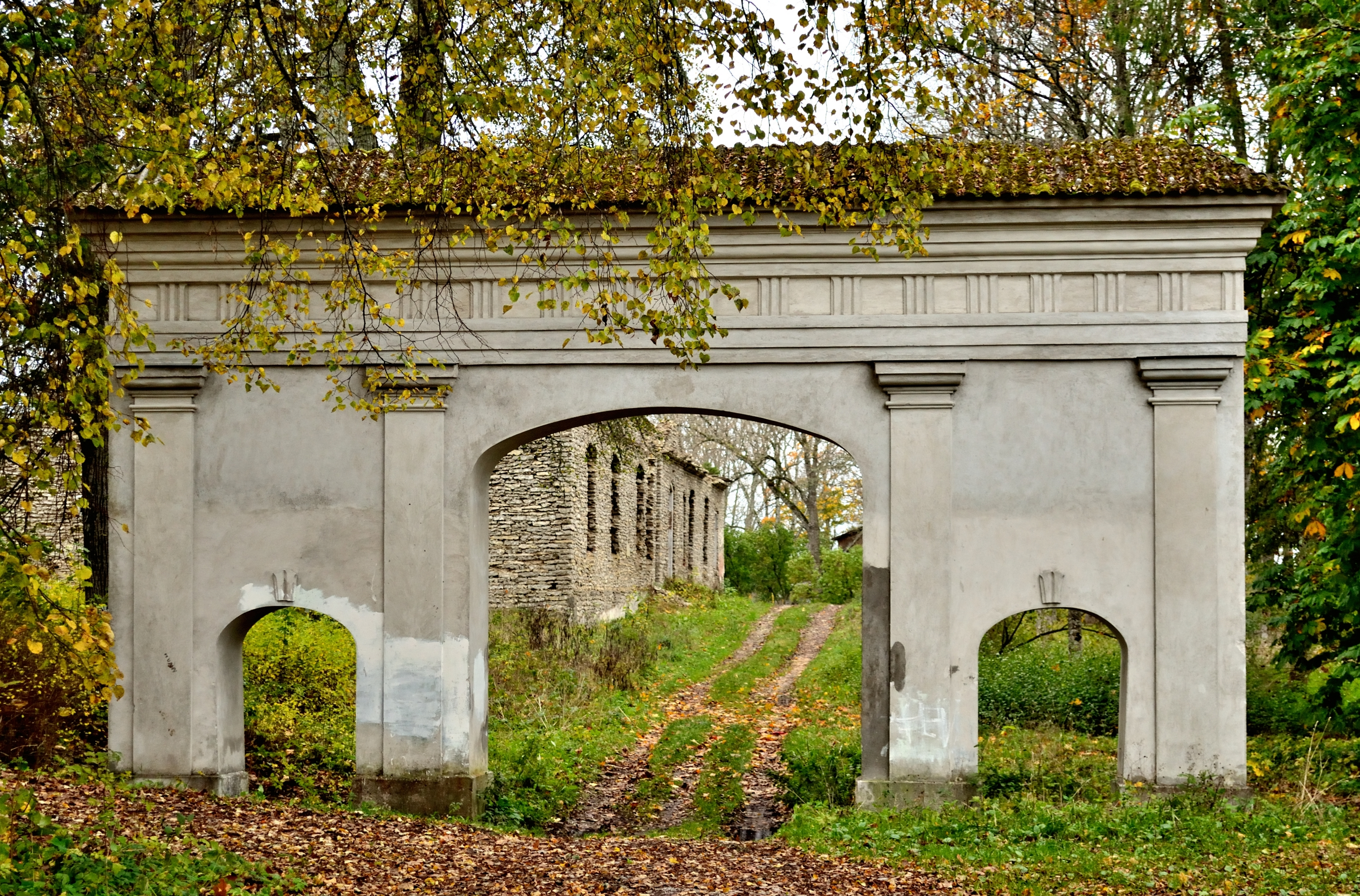
- Nurme manor gate
- Interactive map of Nurme
- Country: Estonia
- County: Harju County
- Parish: Saue Parish
- Time zone: UTC+2 (EET)
  - Summer (DST): UTC+3 (EEST)

Nurme (German: Nurms) is a village in Saue Parish, Harju County in northern Estonia. Prior to the administrative reform of Estonian local governments in 2017, the village belonged to Nissi Parish.
