= Vatsla =

Village in Estonia

- Village
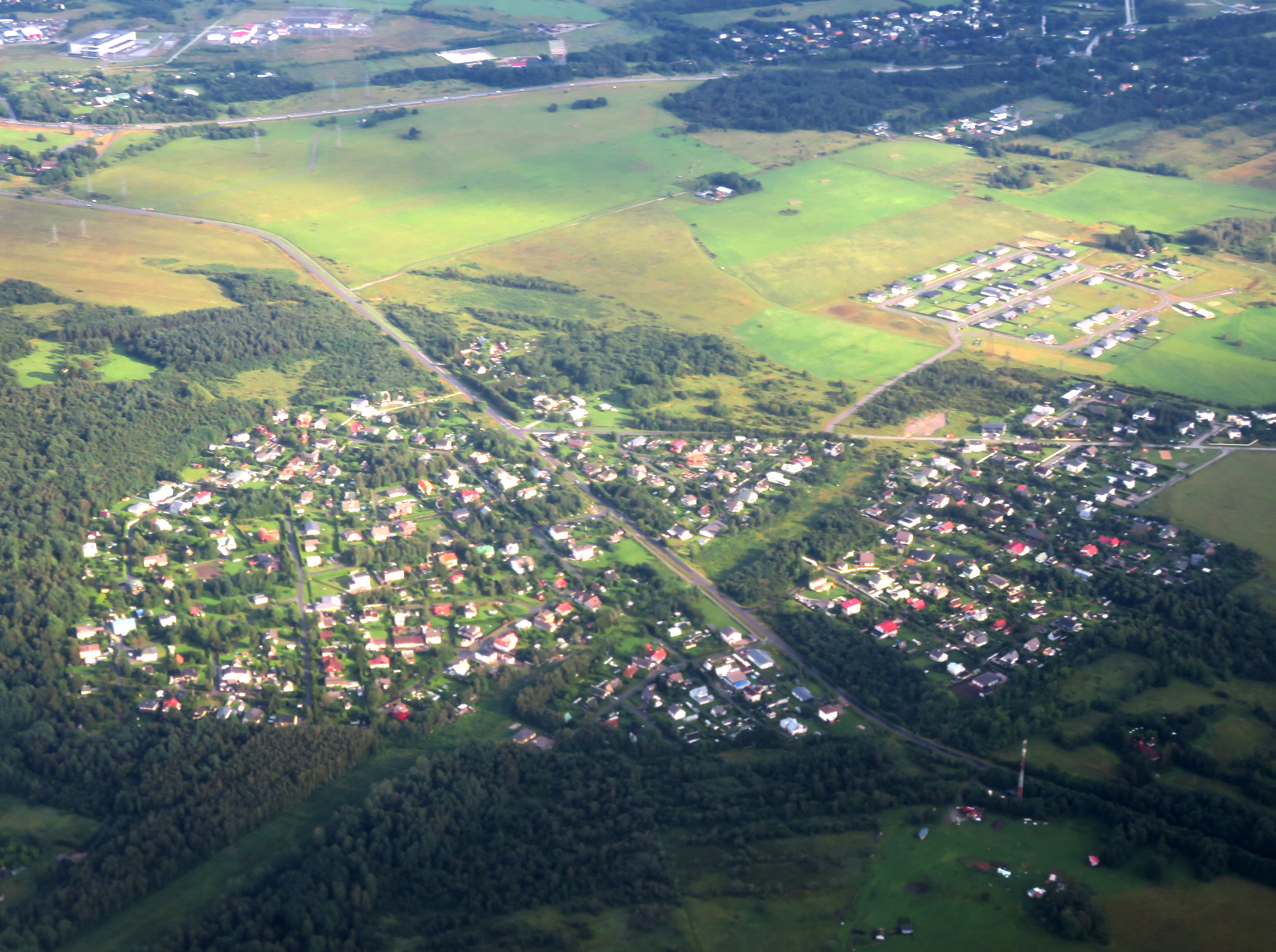

- Location within Estonia
- Coordinates: 59°24′N 24°31′E
- Country: Estonia
- County: Harju County
- Parish: Saue Parish

Area
  - Total: 10.33 km^{2} (3.99 sq mi)

Population (31.12.2011)
  - Total: 371
- Time zone: UTC+2 (EET)
  - Summer (DST): UTC+3 (EEST)

Vatsla is a village in Saue Parish, Harju County in northern Estonia, about 5 km south-west of the city of Tallinn.

The village has two parts and is bisected by Vatsla tee, which forms the main artery of the village and connects it to larger arteries, such as the T191. The older part mainly lies north of this road and forms a majority of the village's buildings, while the roads are mainly narrow gravel roads. The newer part lies south of this road and consists of modern suburban buildings and a network of paved roads. There are also numerous farms and modern residential buildings in fields surrounding the village.

The village is surrounded mainly by fields, while forested areas lie further away. A large part of the village's border runs along the Vääna river.

There are no commercial buildings in the village. There are some smaller logistical buildings in the northern part of the village's territory and a concrete factory. Vatsla is surrounded by large industrial sites, such as quarries, thanks to its proximity to Tallinn, however they lie outside of city limits.

The main transport link of the village is the aforementioned Vatsla tee, which connects to the T191, which furthermore connects to the T8, forming a straight link between Tallinn and Keila. The closest active bus stop to Vatsla lies on the T8 (bus stop Harku), with connections to Tallinn and the surrounding metro area.
