= Pärinurme =

Village in Estonia

- Village
- Location within Estonia
- Coordinates: 59°11′54″N 24°35′11″E
- Country: Estonia
- County: Harju County
- Parish: Saue Parish
- Time zone: UTC+2 (EET)
  - Summer (DST): UTC+3 (EEST)

Pärinurme is a village in Saue Parish, Harju County in northern Estonia.
