= Riisipere =

Borough in Estonia

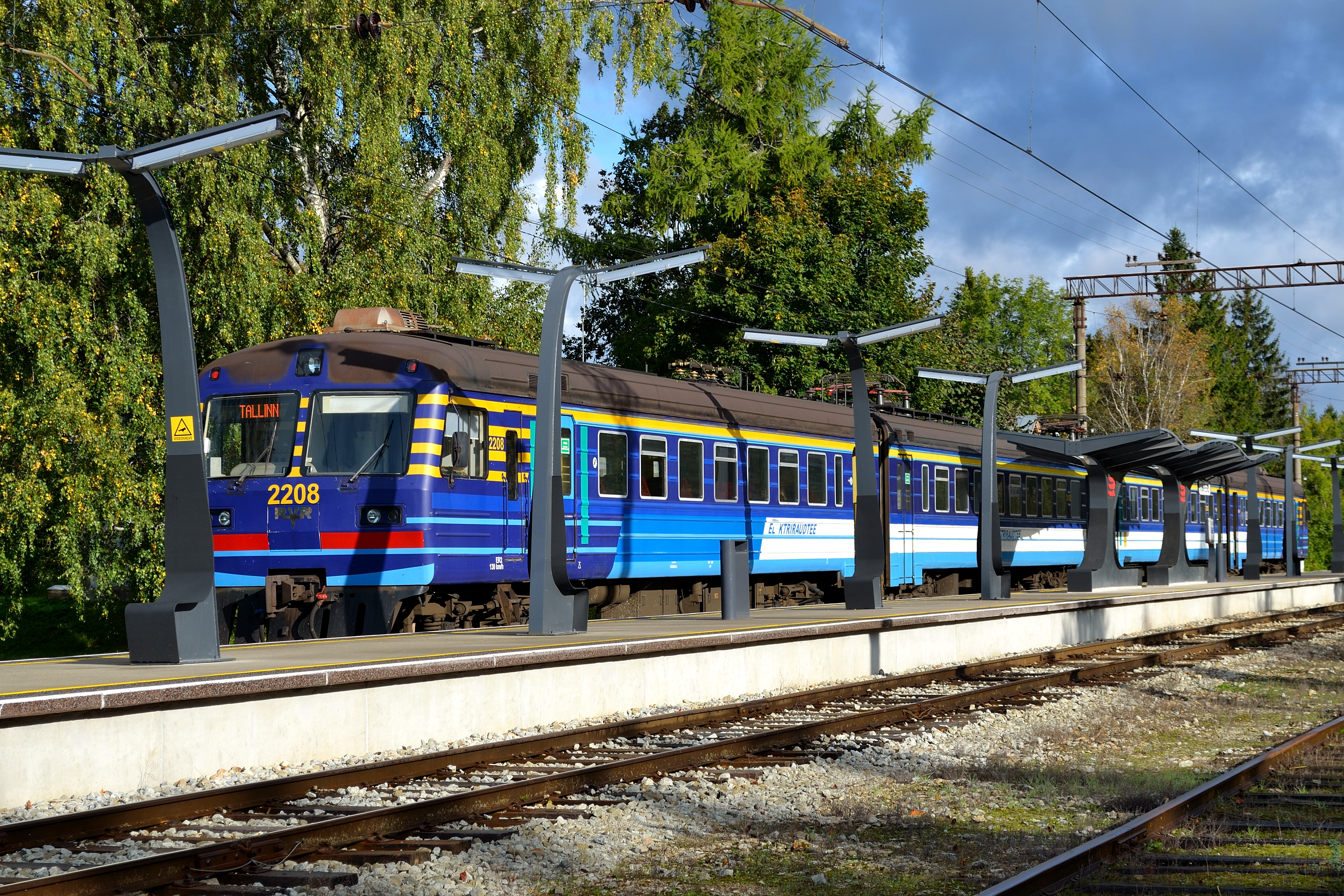
- A train in Riisipere railway station

- Location within Estonia
- Coordinates: 59°07′14″N 24°18′33″E
- Country: Estonia
- County: Harju County
- Parish: Saue Parish

Population (2004)
  - Total: 1,051
- Time zone: UTC+2 (EET)

Riisipere (German: Riesenberg) is a small borough (alevik) in the Saue Parish, Harju County, Estonia. Prior to the administrative reform of Estonian local governments in March 2017, Riisipere was the administrative center of Nissi Parish. Located on the Ääsmäe-Haapsalu road, its distance from Tallinn is 45 km, from Haapsalu 50 km, Märjamaa 30 km, Rapla 40 km.

== The town ==
Riisipere railway station is on the Tallinn-Keila-Turba line which was electrified to Riisipere in 1981. Hourly services are provided by Elron. Originally the line continued to Haapsalu. The Riisipere–Haapsalu section was abandoned in 2004, but was rebuilt as far as Turba in 2019, as a first step towards eventually re-opening the line to Haapsalu (and possibly the port at Rohuküla ).

Part of the Riisipere is called Nissi. Near Nissi is the Nissi Church. In Nissi, there is a community house, a monument for the Estonian War of Independence and a cemetery. The first mentioning of Nissi (as a village) was in Danish Census Book.

Apart from the manor, Nissi Church is the main place of interest. The church was built in 1873 and designed by St. Petersburg architect David Grimm.

The composer Raimond Valgre was born in Riispere in 1913.

== Riisipere manor ==
Riisipere manor (German: Neu-Riesenberg) traces its origins as an estate back to 1394. It has been owned by various well-known Baltic German families over the centuries. The present building was built in 1818-1821 during the ownership of Peter von Stackelberg. The grandiose building is one of the finest examples in Estonia of Neoclassical manor house architecture. The front façade is dominated by a six-column portico with a truncated ornamental gable and two three-storeyed side projections. The interior displays an enfilade of representative premises, including a cupola hall, unique in Estonia, and a richly decorated hypostyle "white hall", abundant with details in stucco. The manor is surrounded by a park with an artificial lake.

== Gallery ==
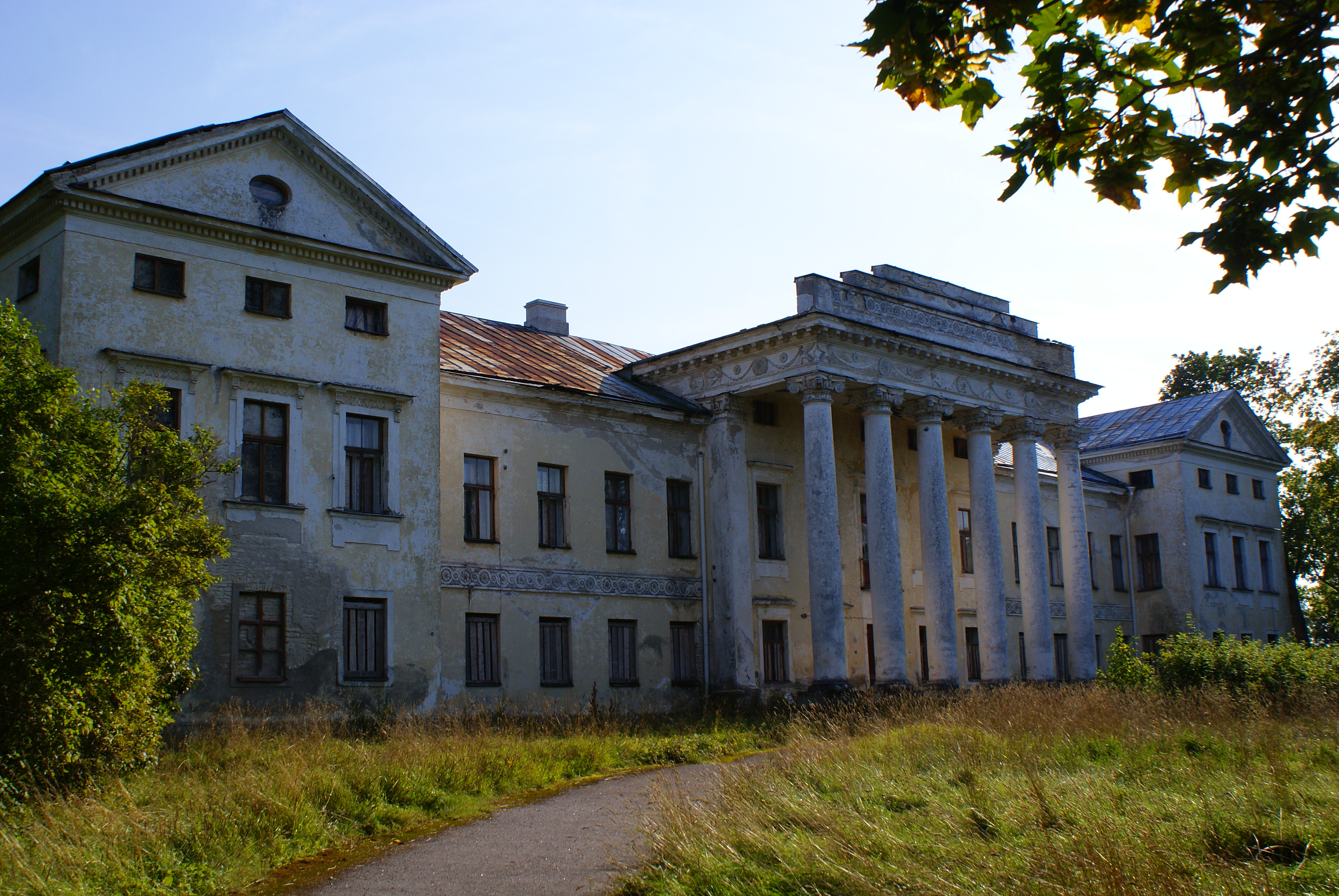
Riisipere manor house

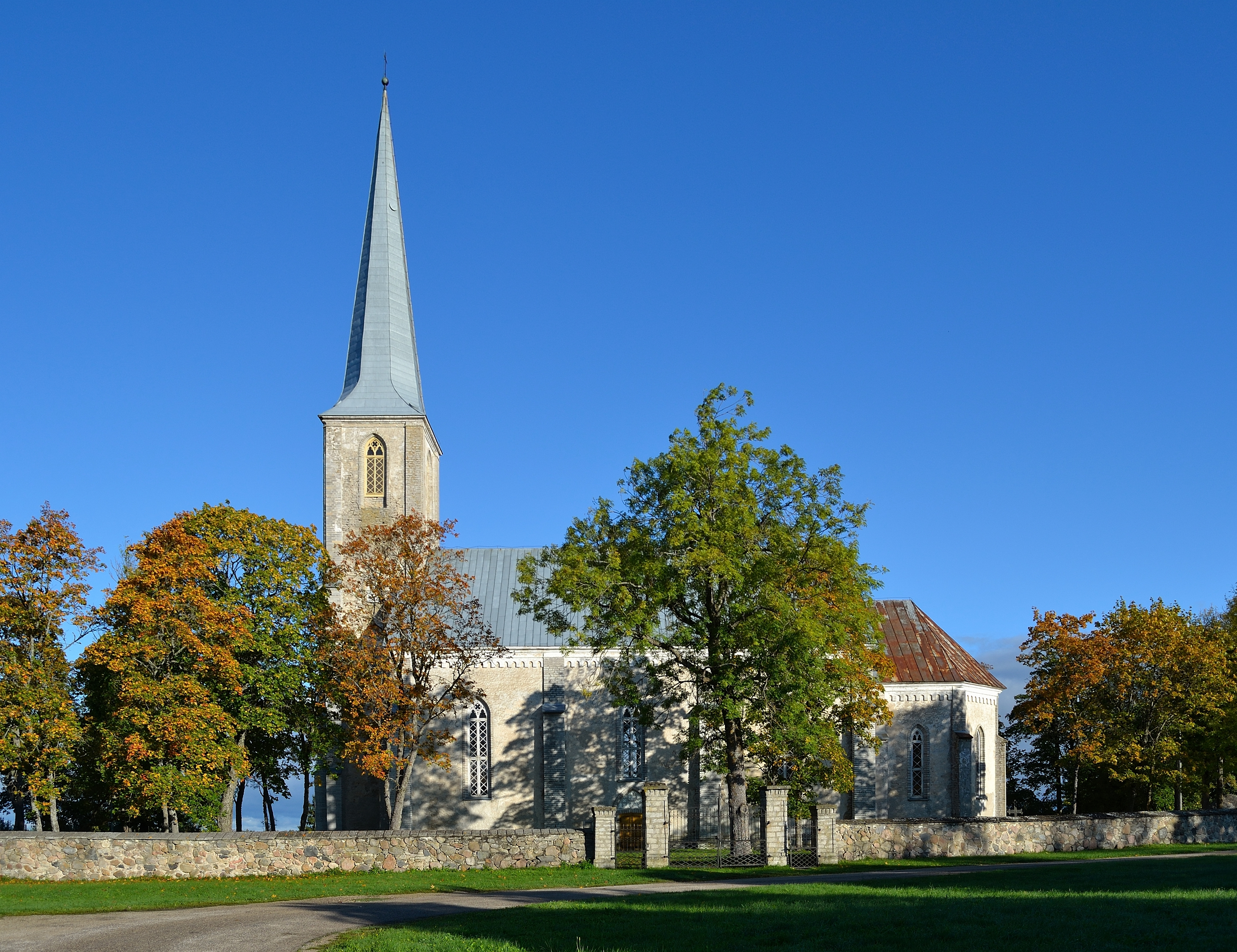
Nissi church

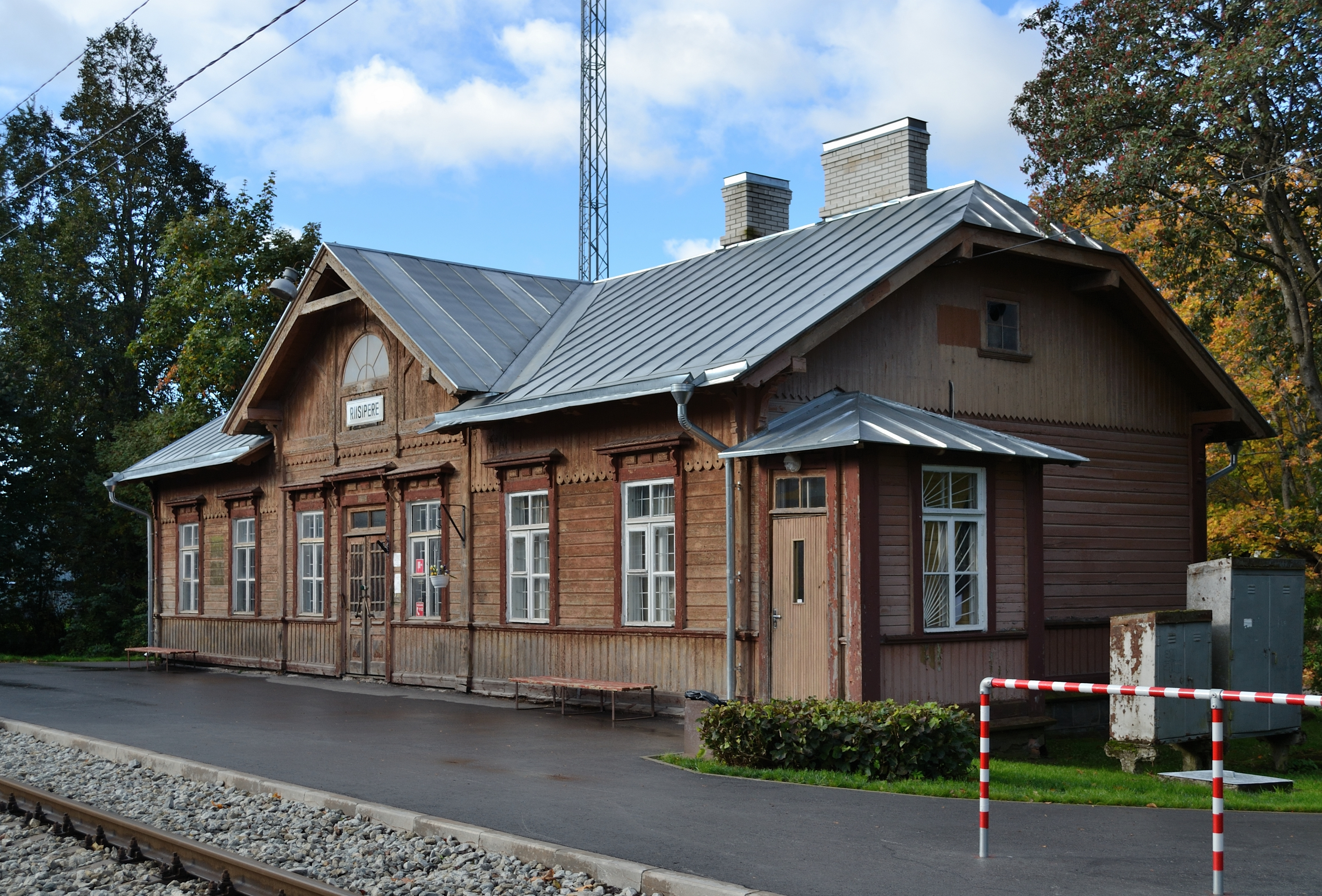
Riisipere train station building

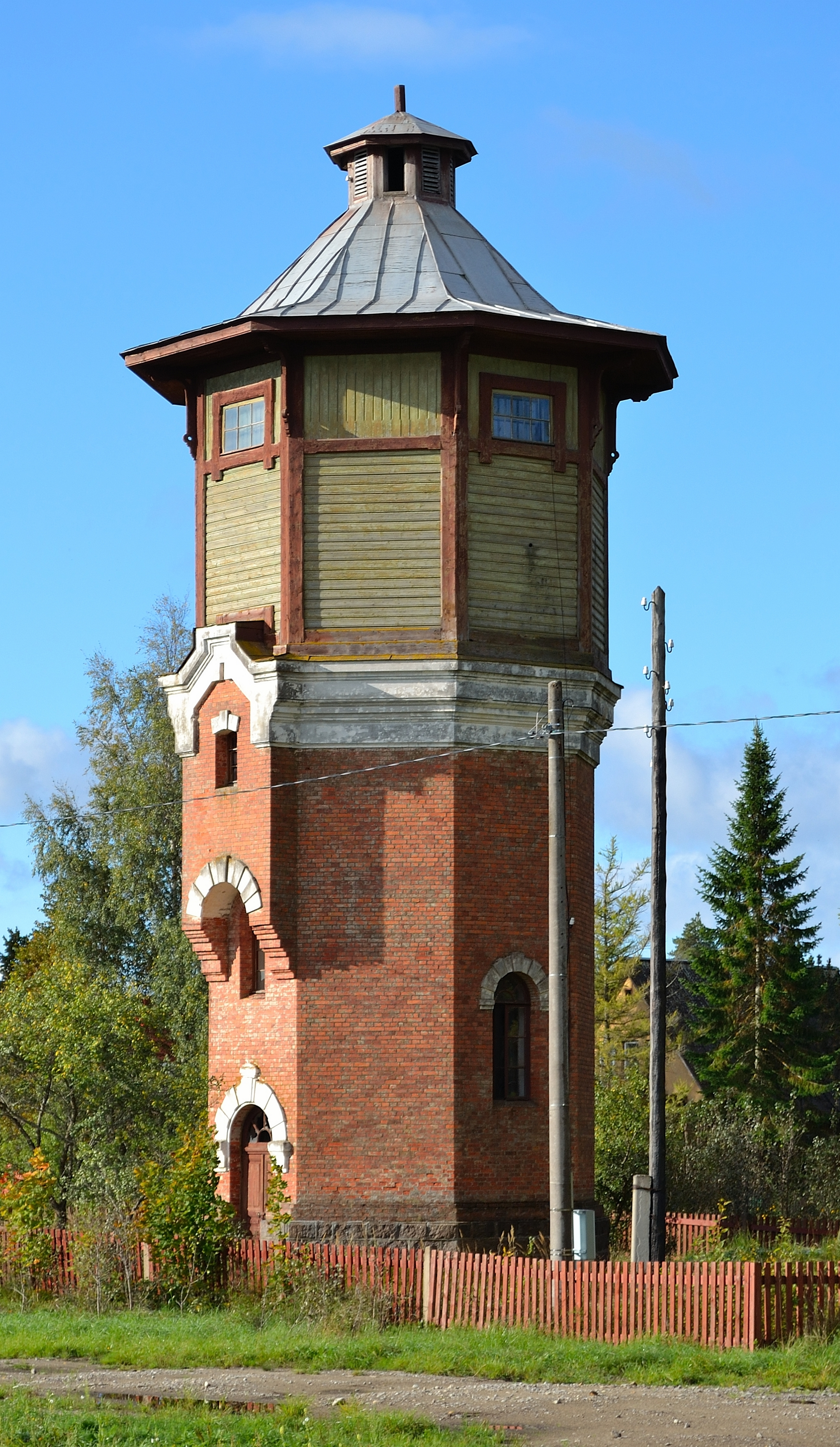
Water tower in railway station

Preceding station	Elron	Following station
Jaanika towards Tallinn	Tallinn–Turba/Paldiski	Turba Terminus
