= Kibuna =

Village in Estonia

Coordinates: 59°12′N 24°17′E

- Village
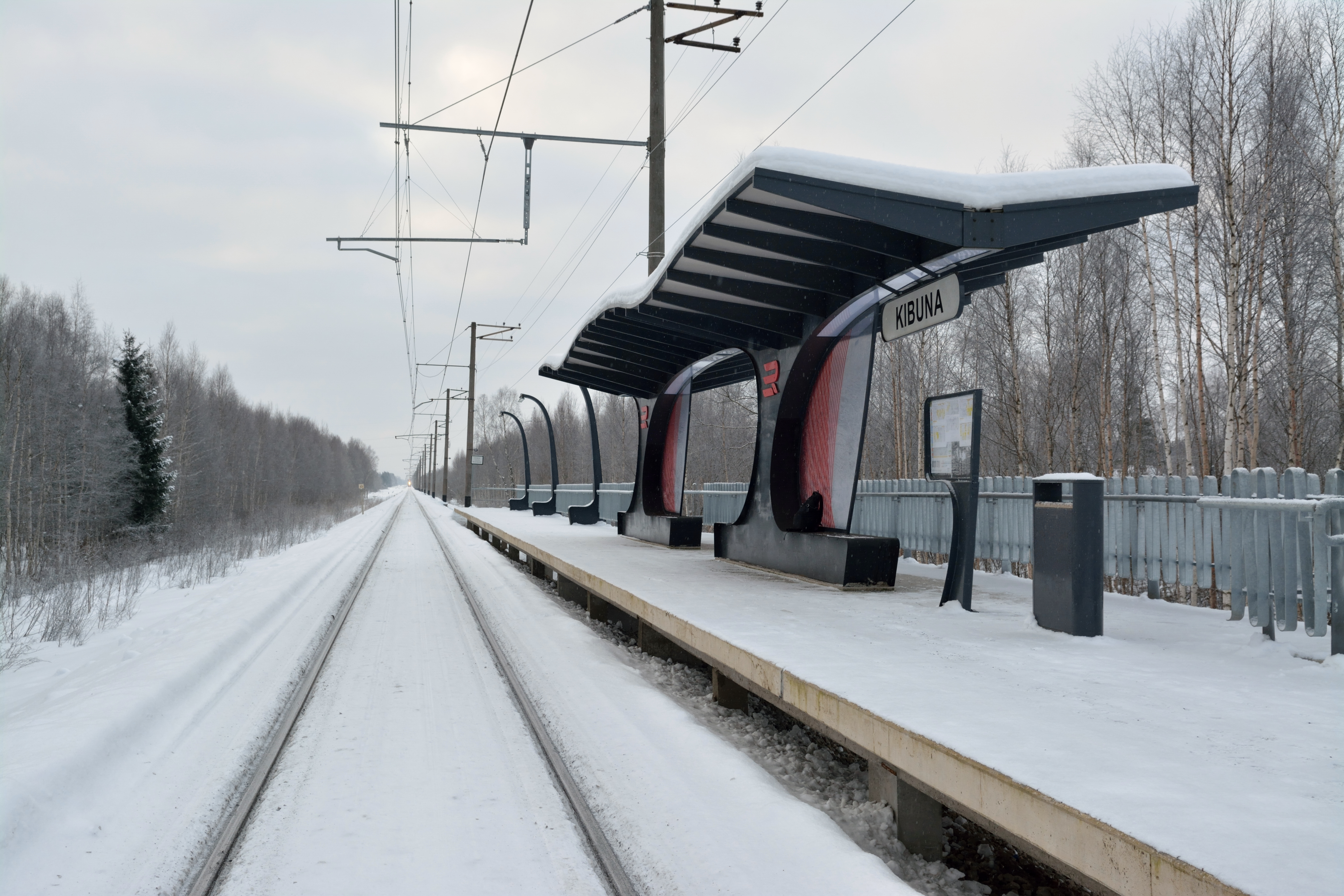
- Kibuna railway station
- Interactive map of Kibuna
- Country: Estonia
- County: Harju County
- Parish: Saue Parish
- Time zone: UTC+2 (EET)
  - Summer (DST): UTC+3 (EEST)

Kibuna is a village in Saue Parish, Harju County in northern Estonia. Prior to the administrative reform of Estonian local governments in 2017, the village belonged to Kernu Parish. It has a station on the Elron western route.

Preceding station	Elron	Following station
Vasalemma towards Tallinn	Tallinn–Turba/Paldiski	Laitse towards Turba
