= Kaasiku, Harju County =

Village in Estonia

Coordinates: 59°12′12″N 24°19′10″E

Kaasiku
- Village
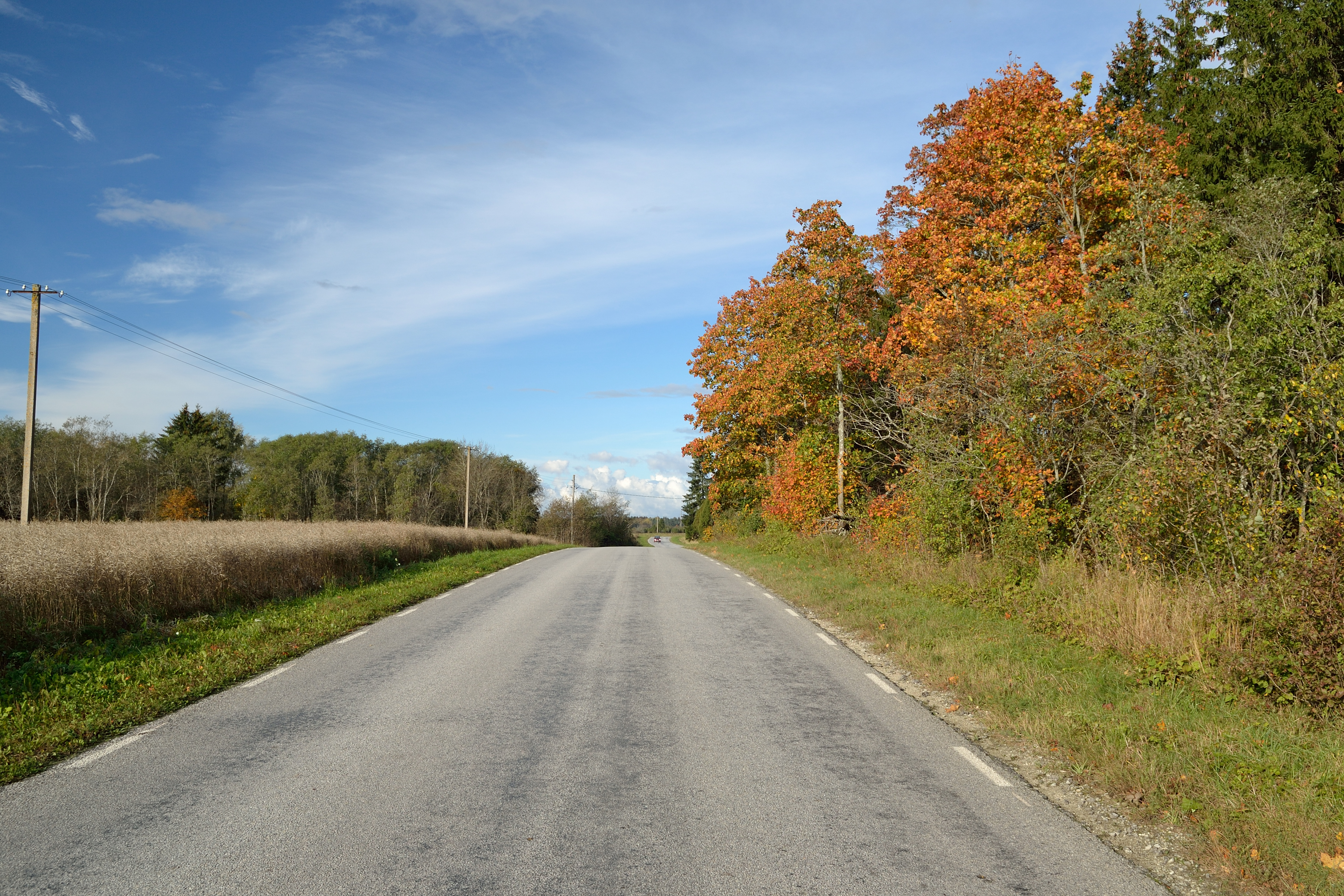
- Interactive map of Kaasiku
- Country: Estonia
- County: Harju County
- Parish: Saue Parish
- Time zone: UTC+2 (EET)
  - Summer (DST): UTC+3 (EEST)

Kaasiku is a village in Saue Parish, Harju County in northern Estonia. Prior to the administrative reform of Estonian local governments in 2017, the village belonged to Kernu Parish.

Kaasiku has a station named "Laitse" on the Elron western route.

Preceding station	Elron	Following station
Kibuna towards Tallinn	Tallinn–Turba/Paldiski	Jaanika towards Turba
