= Jõgisoo, Harju County =

Village in Estonia

Jõgisoo
- Village
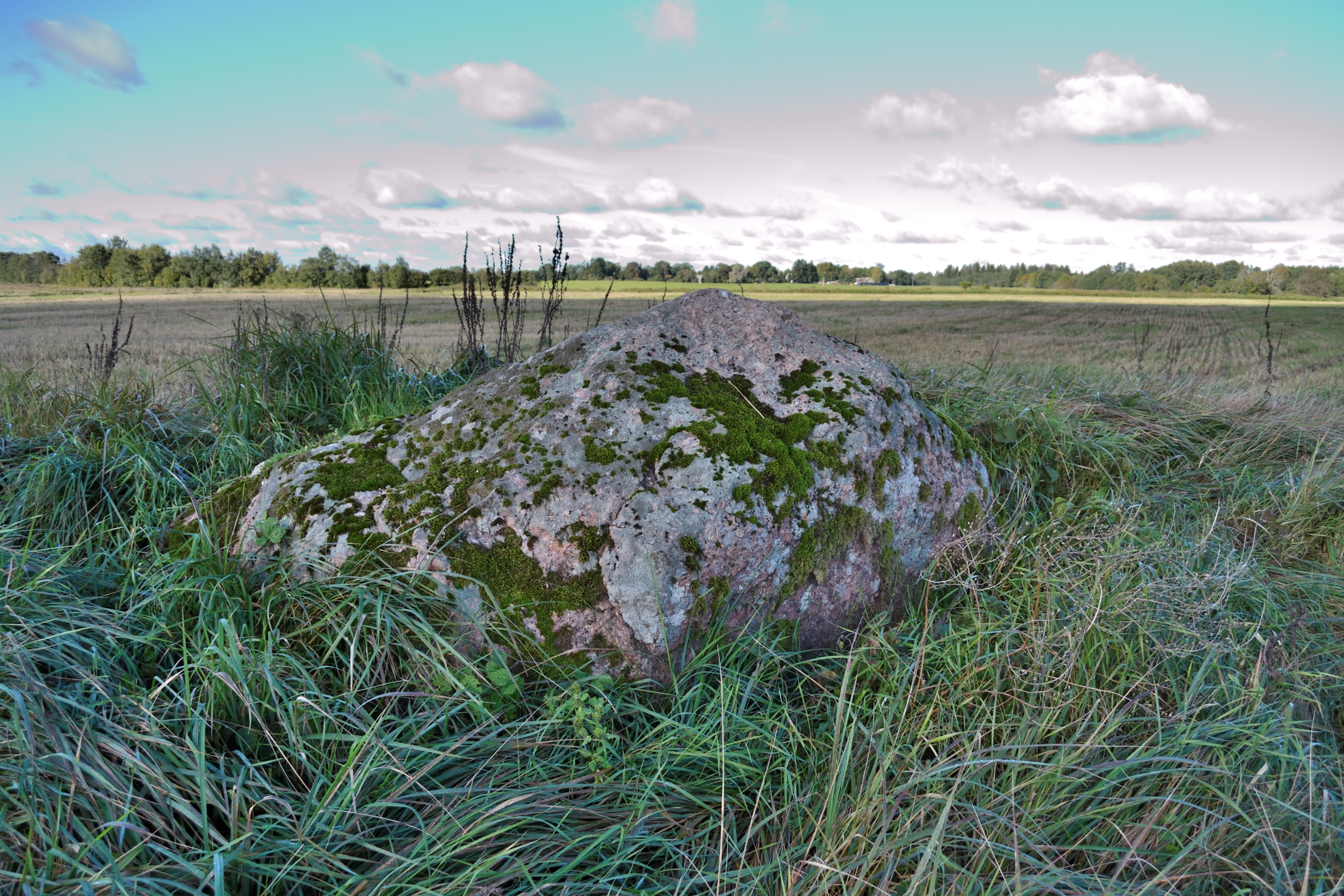
- Cult stone in Jõgisoo

- Location within Estonia
- Coordinates: 59°17′21″N 24°31′25″E
- Country: Estonia
- County: Harju County
- Parish: Saue Parish
- Time zone: UTC+2 (EET)
  - Summer (DST): UTC+3 (EEST)

Jõgisoo is a village in Saue Parish, Harju County in northern Estonia.
