= Jaanika =

Village in Estonia

- Village
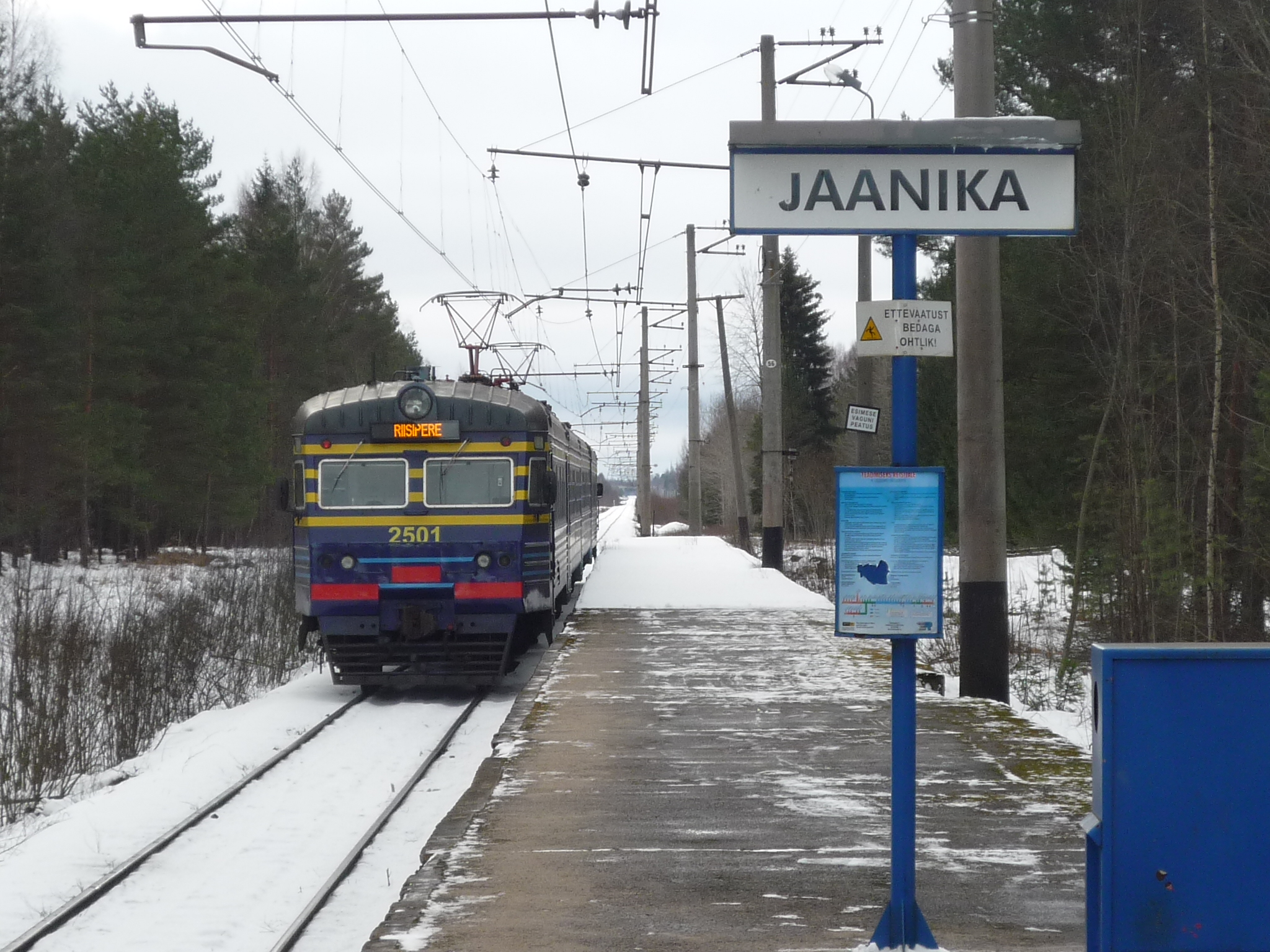
- Jaanika railway station
- Interactive map of Jaanika
- Coordinates: 59°09′N 24°19′E
- Country: Estonia
- County: Harju County
- Parish: Saue Parish
- Time zone: UTC+2 (EET)
  - Summer (DST): UTC+3 (EEST)

Jaanika is a village in Saue Parish, Harju County in northern Estonia. Prior to the administrative reform of Estonian local governments in 2017, the village belonged to Nissi Parish.

Jaanika has a station on the Elron western route between Tallinn and Turba.

Preceding station	Elron	Following station
Laitse towards Tallinn	Tallinn–Turba/Paldiski	Riisipere towards Turba
