= Tuula, Estonia =

Village in Estonia

Tuula
- Village
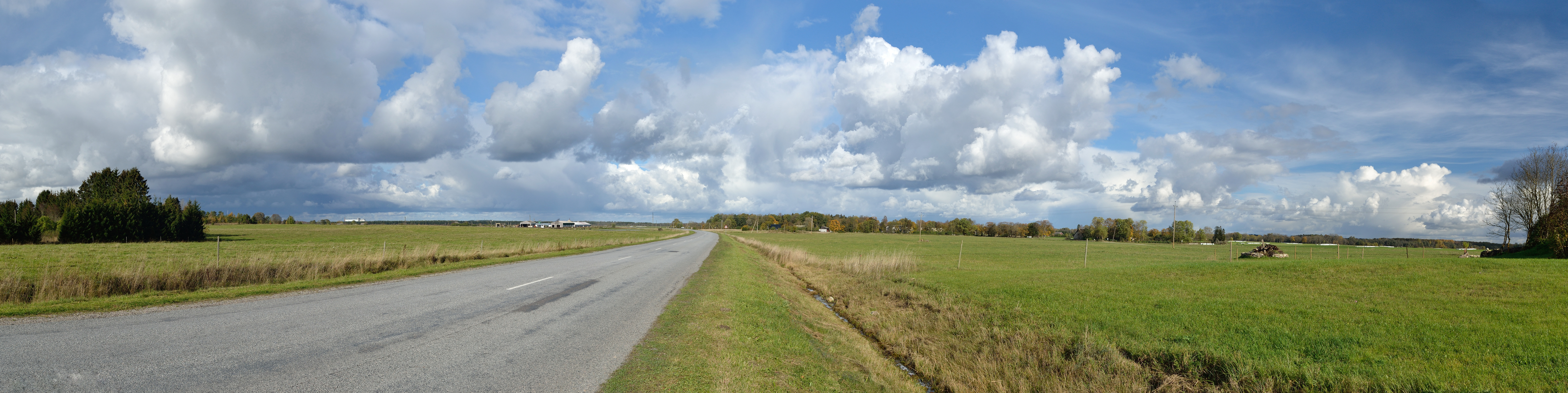
- Keila–Ääsmäe road in Tuula

- Location within Estonia
- Coordinates: 59°16′0″N 24°27′0″E
- Country: Estonia
- County: Harju County
- Parish: Saue Parish

Population
  - Total: 214"Tuula Estonia Population". Geopedia.
- Time zone: UTC+2 (EET)
  - Summer (DST): UTC+3 (EEST)

Tuula is a village in Saue Parish, Harju County in northern Estonia.
