= Vasalemma =

Borough in Estonia

- Small borough
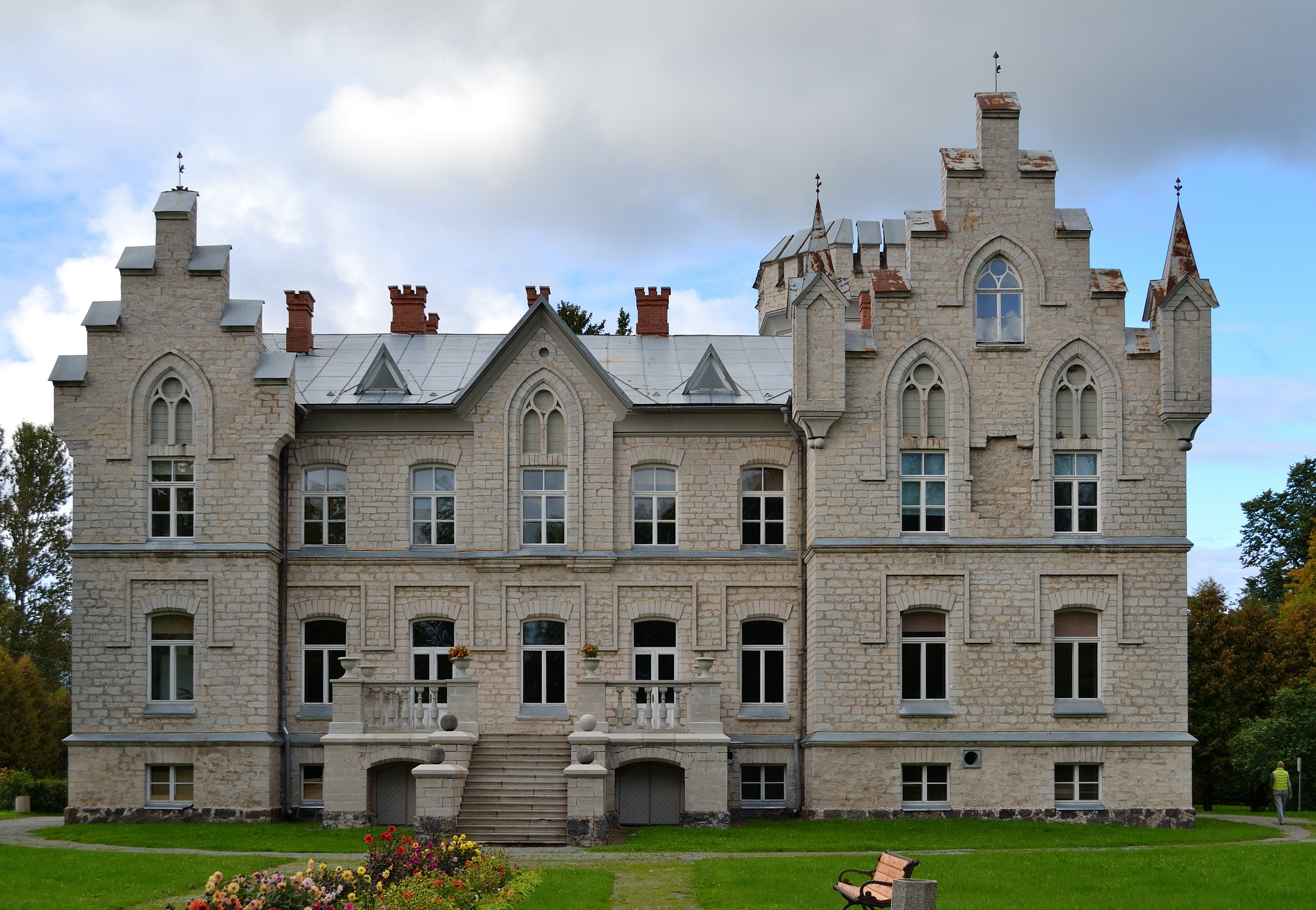
- Vasalemma Manor main building

- Location in Estonia
- Coordinates: 59°14′15″N 24°17′36″E
- Country: Estonia
- County: Harju County
- Municipality: Lääne-Harju Parish

Population (2011 Census)
  - Total: 879

Vasalemma is a small borough (Estonian: alevik) in Harju County, northwestern Estonia. As of the 2011 census, the settlement's population was 879, of which the Estonians were 711 (80.9%).

Vasalemma has a station on the Elron western route.

== Vasalemma Manor ==
Vasalemma (German: Wassalem) estate was founded in 1825 and in 1890-93 the present manor house was erected by Baltic German landowner Eduard von Baggehufwudt. The architect was Konstantin Wilcken, who designed the house in a bare limestone neo-Gothic style. Several interior details have survived from this period, such as wainscoting, coffered ceilings and pig-iron ovens.

Preceding station	Elron	Following station
Kulna towards Tallinn	Tallinn–Turba/Paldiski	Kibuna towards Turba
