= National Institute of Animal Biotechnology =

Indian research institute

- Motto: "Animal Health for Human Welfare"
- Established: 2010
- Field of research: Animal Biotechnology
- Director: Dr. Ravi Kumar Gandham
- Location: Hyderabad, India, 500032; 17.4364107°N 78.3213432°E
- Campus: Urban, Gachibowli
- Operating agency: Department of Biotechnology
- Website: https://www.niab.res.in/

The National Institute of Animal Biotechnology is an Indian autonomous research establishment of the Department of Biotechnology, Ministry of Science and Technology (India). The NIAB was set up in Hyderabad, India, under the leadership of Prof. Pallu Reddanna. "The state of the art of Animal Biotechnology and Transgenics institute" is housed in the NIAB Campus in Gachibowli.. Presently, Dr. Ravi Kumar Gandham is the Director of NIAB.

The primary mandate of NIAB is towards the development of sustainability and globally competitive livestock (farm animals) for public and industry through innovative and cutting edge technology. There will emphasis on showing excellence in production of globally competitive livestock products, pharmaceuticals (medicines), nutritional products and other biologicals related to animal health care.

== Academics and research ==
The main focus of NIAB is to nurture the bio-entrepreneurship in the animal biotechnology field and to perform translational research involving livestock which would be beneficial to mankind. There will be research laboratories of various disciplines e.g. Genomics, Nutrition enrichment, transgenic technology, infectious diseases and Reproductive biotechnology. NIAB will conduct teaching and research programs of M.Sc. and Ph.D. to train young scientists. Dr. G. Taru Sharma took charge as new director since 7 December 2021.

== See also ==
- Genome Valley
- Education in India
- Literacy in India
- List of institutions of higher education in Telangana
