= Munalaskme =

Village in Estonia

Coordinates: 59°11′N 24°16′E

- Village
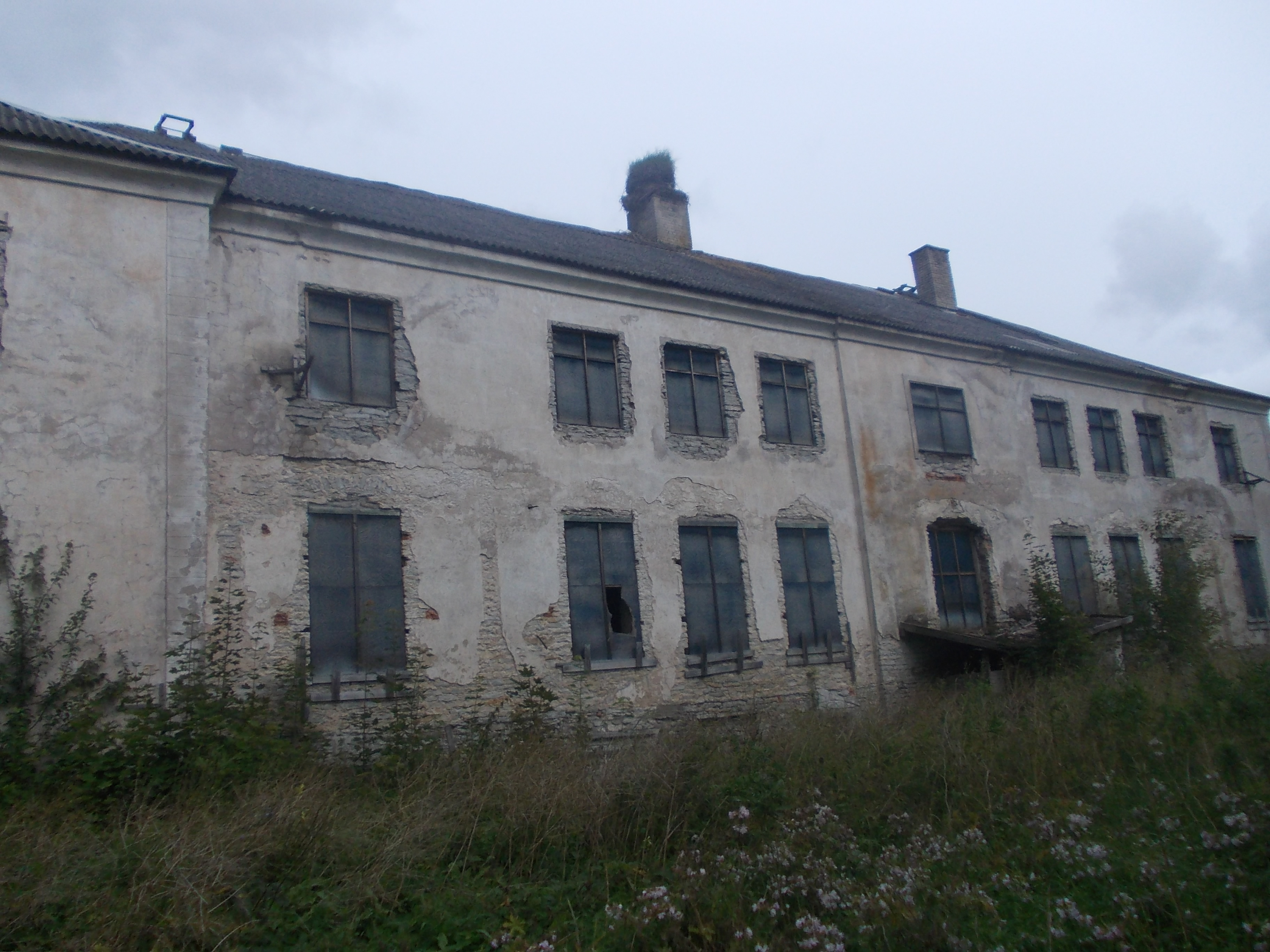
- Munalaskme manor, founded in the 17th-century
- Interactive map of Munalaskme
- Country: Estonia
- County: Harju County
- Parish: Saue Parish
- Time zone: UTC+2 (EET)
  - Summer (DST): UTC+3 (EEST)

Munalaskme (German: Munnalas) is a village in Saue Parish, Harju County in northern Estonia. Prior to the administrative reform of Estonian local governments in 2017, the village belonged to Nissi Parish.
