= Aila, Estonia =

Village in Estonia

Aila
- Village
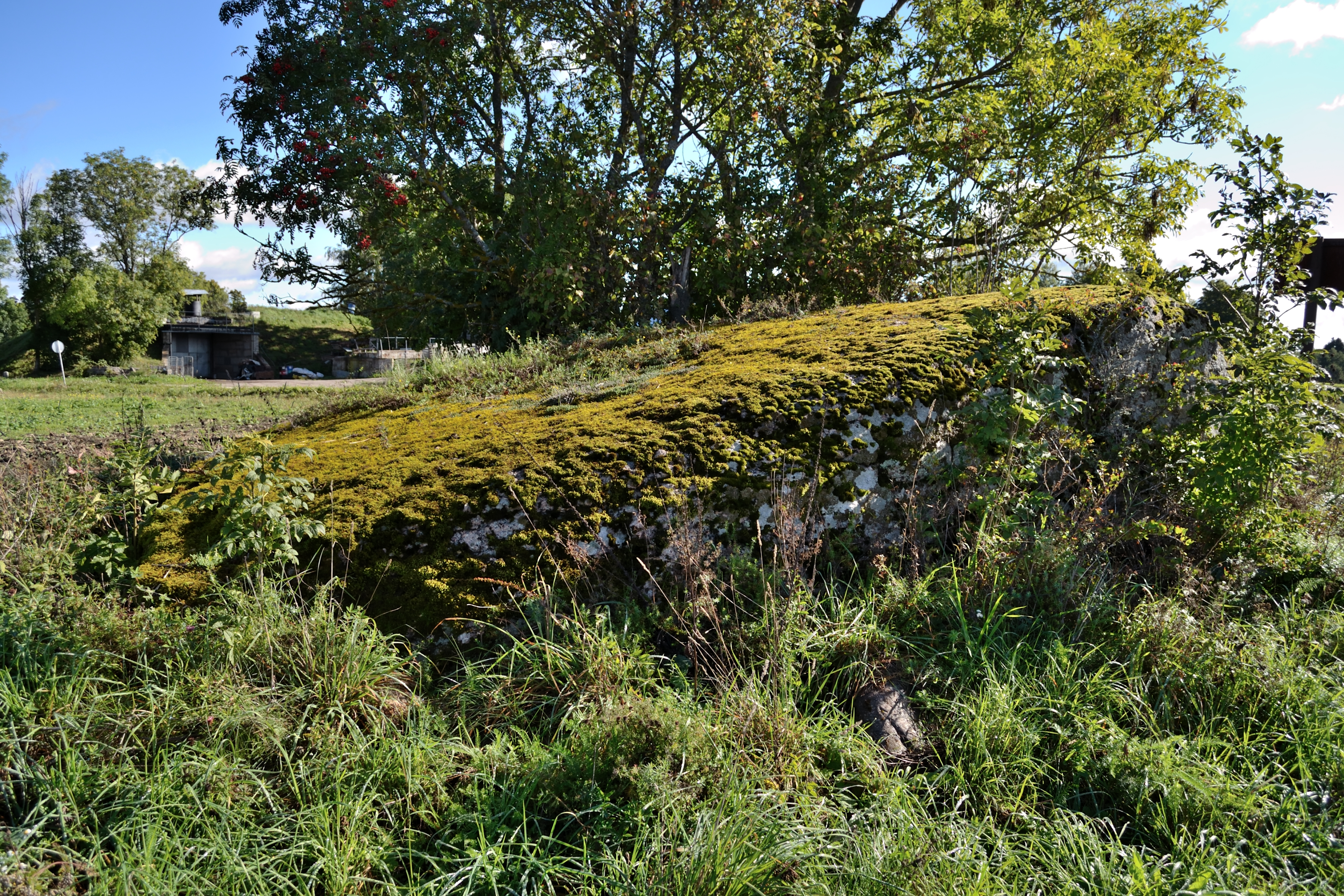
- Cult stone in Aila

- Location within Estonia
- Coordinates: 59°17′27″N 24°29′11″E
- Country: Estonia
- County: Harju County
- Parish: Saue Parish

Population
  - Total: 114
- Time zone: UTC+2 (EET)
  - Summer (DST): UTC+3 (EEST)

Aila is a village in Saue Parish, Harju County in northern Estonia. As of the 2021 census, it had a population of 207 residents, up from 178 in 2011 and 115 in 2000, reflecting gradual growth over recent decades. The village lies within the suburban expanse of the Tallinn region and forms part of one of Estonia's most rapidly developing rural municipalities.
