= Rehemäe =

Village in Estonia

Coordinates: 59°00′N 24°07′E

- Village
- Interactive map of Rehemäe
- Country: Estonia
- County: Lääne County
- Parish: Lääne-Nigula Parish
- Time zone: UTC+2 (EET)
  - Summer (DST): UTC+3 (EEST)

Rehemäe is a village in Lääne-Nigula Parish, Lääne County in western Estonia. Prior to the administrative reform of Estonian local governments in March 2017, the village belonged to Nissi Parish.
