= Koppelmaa =

Village in Estonia

- Village
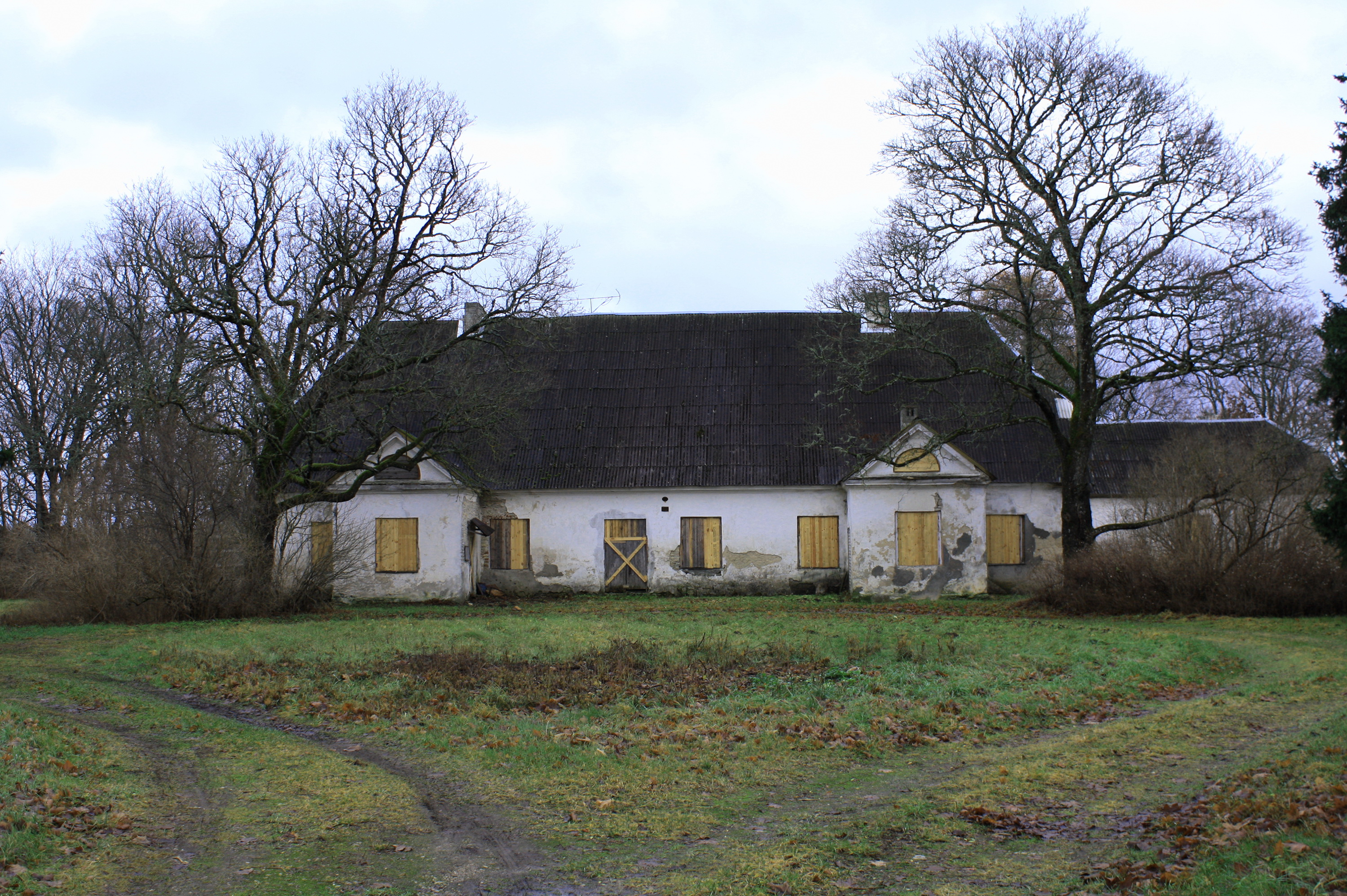
- Voore Manor in Koppelmaa

- Location within Estonia
- Coordinates: 59°16′05″N 24°32′51″E
- Country: Estonia
- County: Harju County
- Parish: Saue Parish
- Time zone: UTC+2 (EET)
  - Summer (DST): UTC+3 (EEST)

Koppelmaa (German: Koppelmann) is a village in Saue Parish, Harju County in northern Estonia.
