= Vanamõisa, Saue Parish =

Village in Estonia

Vanamõisa
- Village
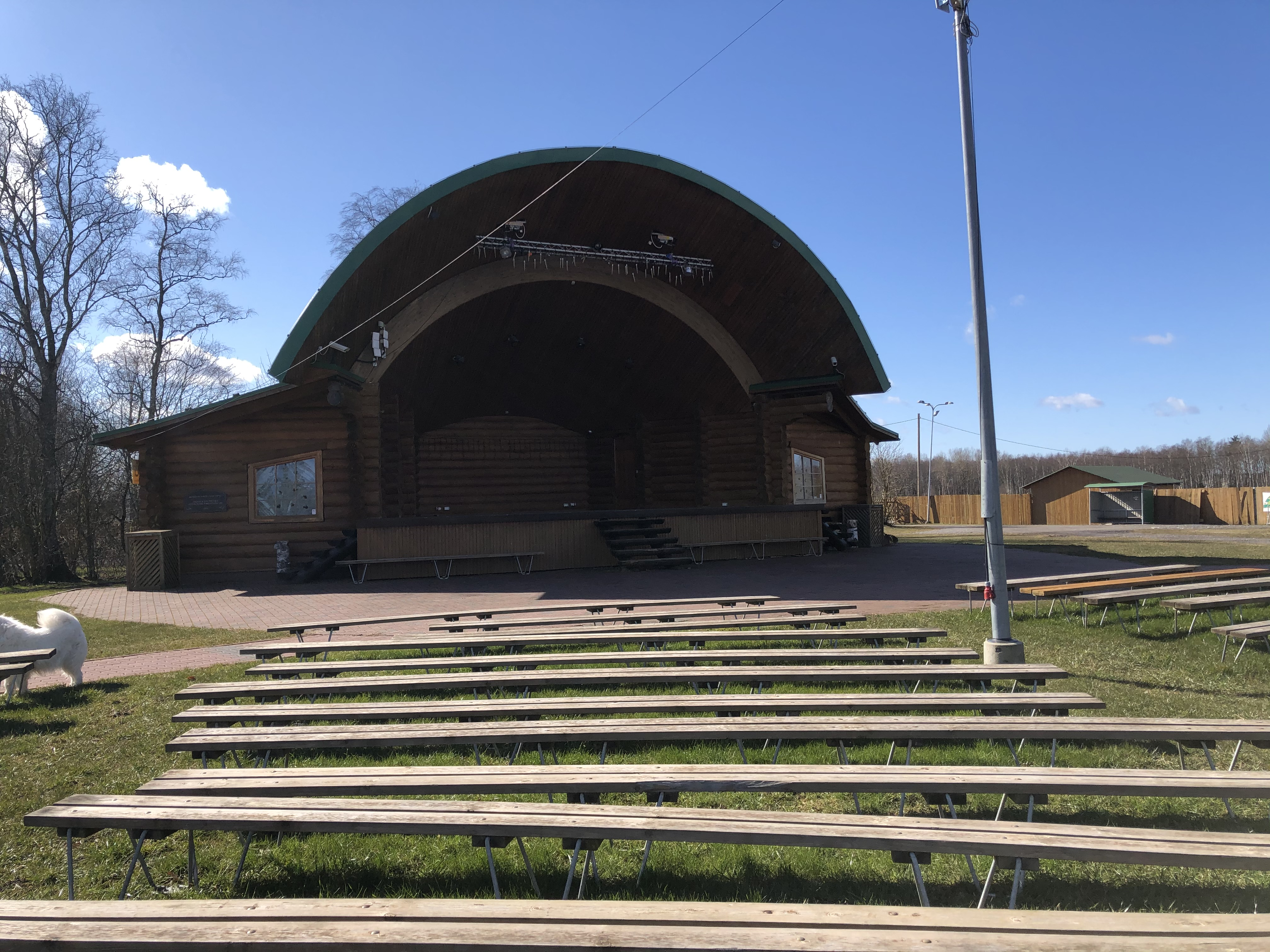
- Singing stage of the Vanamõisa open-air centre

- Location within Estonia
- Coordinates: 59°19′49″N 24°32′54″E
- Country: Estonia
- County: Harju County
- Parish: Saue Parish
- Time zone: UTC+2 (EET)
  - Summer (DST): UTC+3 (EEST)

Vanamõisa (German: Wannamois) is a village in Saue Parish, Harju County in northern Estonia. The name of the village comes from the Vanamõisa manor, which was separated from Saue manor in 1670.

Some of the main attractions in the village today are one of the biggest caravan park in Estonia, Vanamõisa open-air leisure centre (Vanamõisa Vabaõhukeskus) and Kasemäe horse stable.
