= Alliku, Harju County =

Village in Estonia

Alliku
- Village
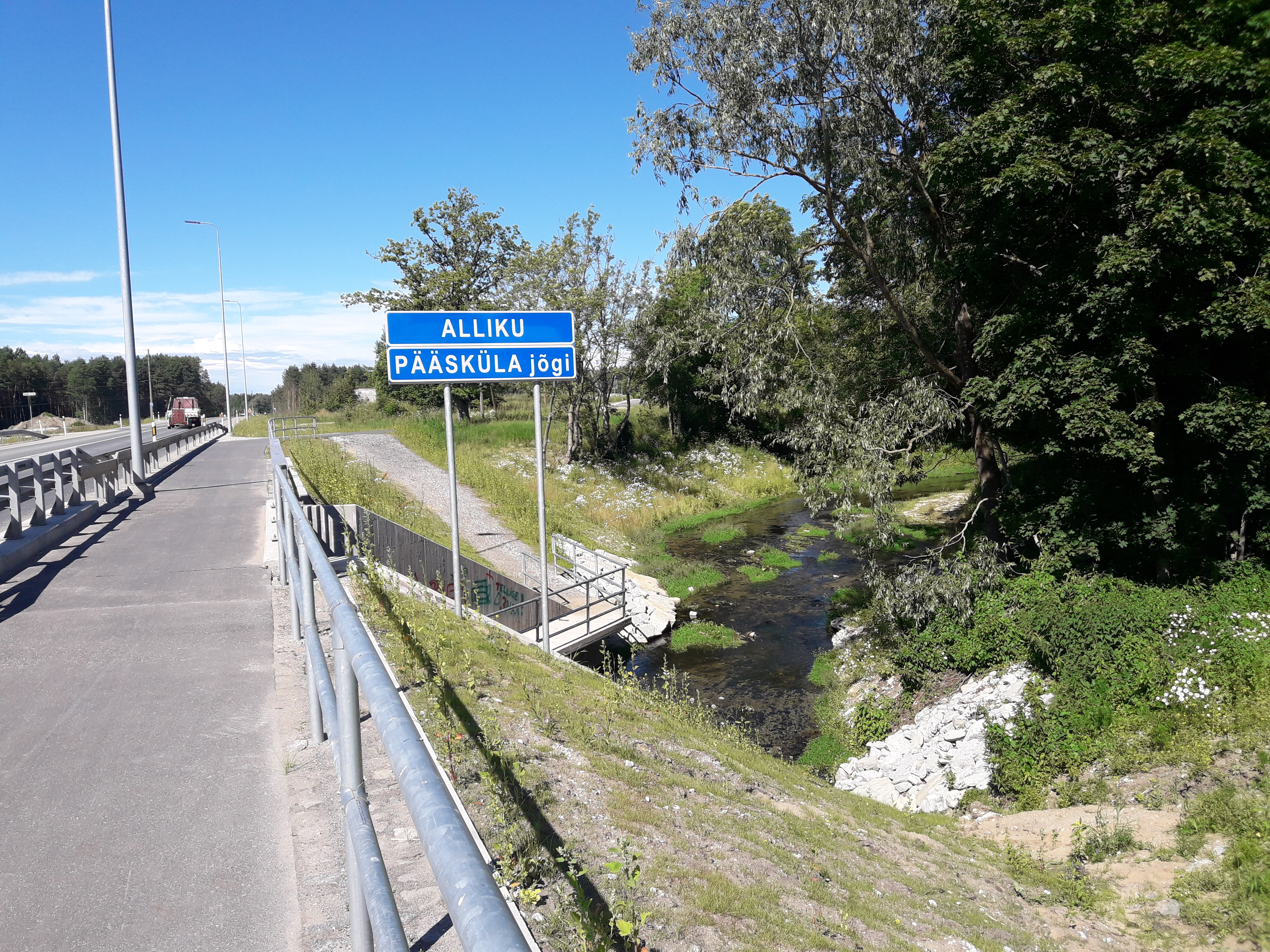
- Bridge over the Pääsküla river in Alliku

- Location within Estonia
- Coordinates: 59°21′21″N 24°33′22″E
- Country: Estonia
- County: Harju County
- Parish: Saue Parish
- Time zone: UTC+2 (EET)
  - Summer (DST): UTC+3 (EEST)

Alliku is a village in Saue Parish, Harju County in northern Estonia.

Padula railway station on the Elron western route is located there.
