= Tabara, Estonia =

Village in Estonia

Coordinates: 59°06′N 24°13′E

Tabara
- Village
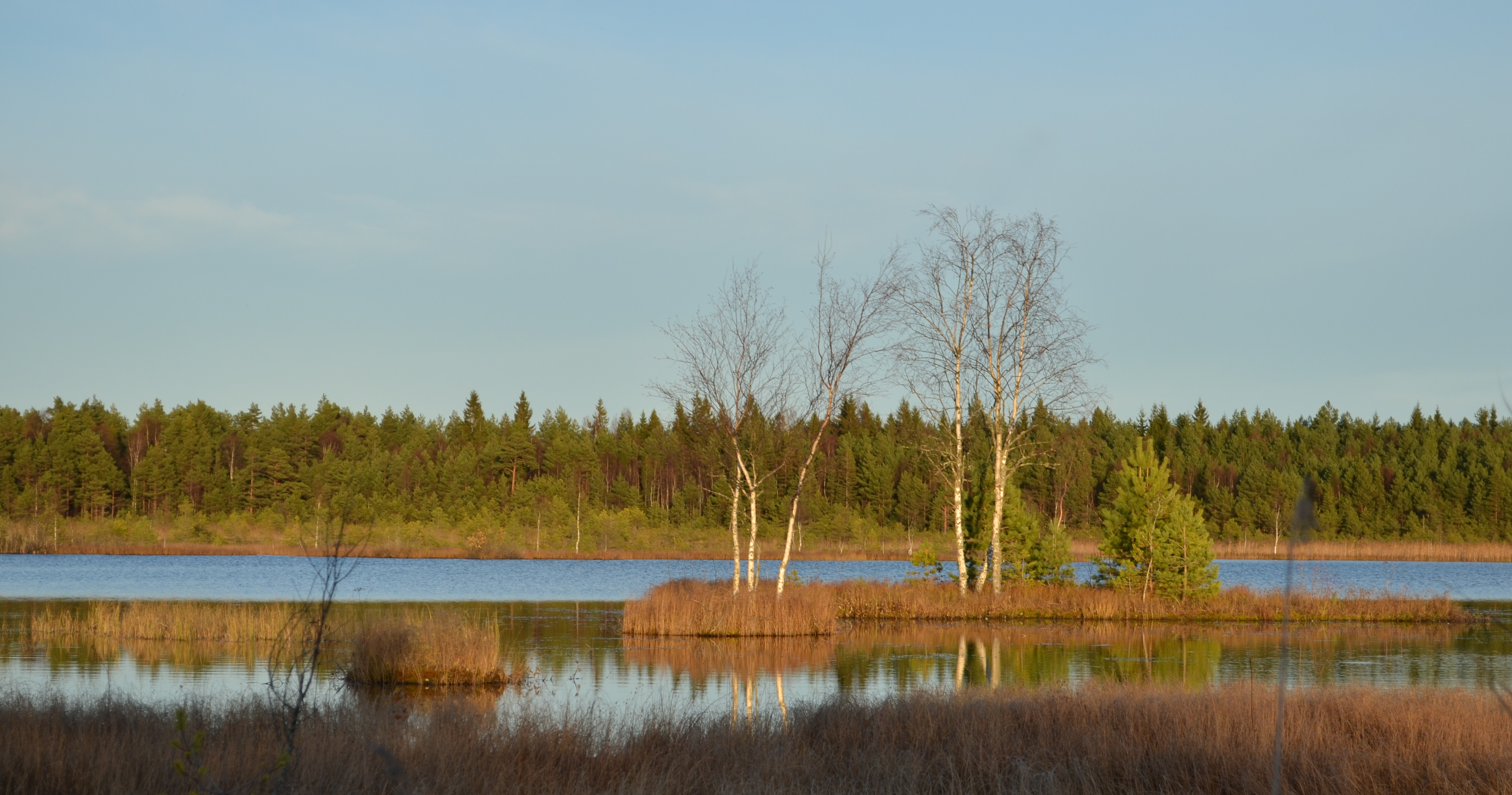
- Lake Laanemaa in Tabara
- Interactive map of Tabara
- Country: Estonia
- County: Harju County
- Parish: Saue Parish
- Time zone: UTC+2 (EET)
  - Summer (DST): UTC+3 (EEST)

Tabara is a village in Saue Parish, Harju County in northern Estonia. Prior to the administrative reform of Estonian local governments in March 2017, the village belonged to Nissi Parish.
