= Pallu Reddanna =

Indian animal scientist

Pallu Reddanna (P. Reddanna) is professor at Department of Animal Sciences, School of Life Sciences, University of Hyderabad (India) and Founder Director of newly established National Institute of Animal Biotechnology. He is an eminent Indian scientist in the field of physiological and pathological studies related to inflammation and cancer disease.
