= Pällu, Harju County =

Village in Estonia

Pällu
- Village
- Location within Estonia
- Coordinates: 59°14′25″N 24°28′08″E
- Country: Estonia
- County: Harju County
- Parish: Saue Parish
- Time zone: UTC+2 (EET)
  - Summer (DST): UTC+3 (EEST)

Pällu is a village in Saue Parish, Harju County in northern Estonia.
