= Aude, Estonia =

Village in Estonia

Coordinates: 59°10′N 24°15′E

Aude
- Village
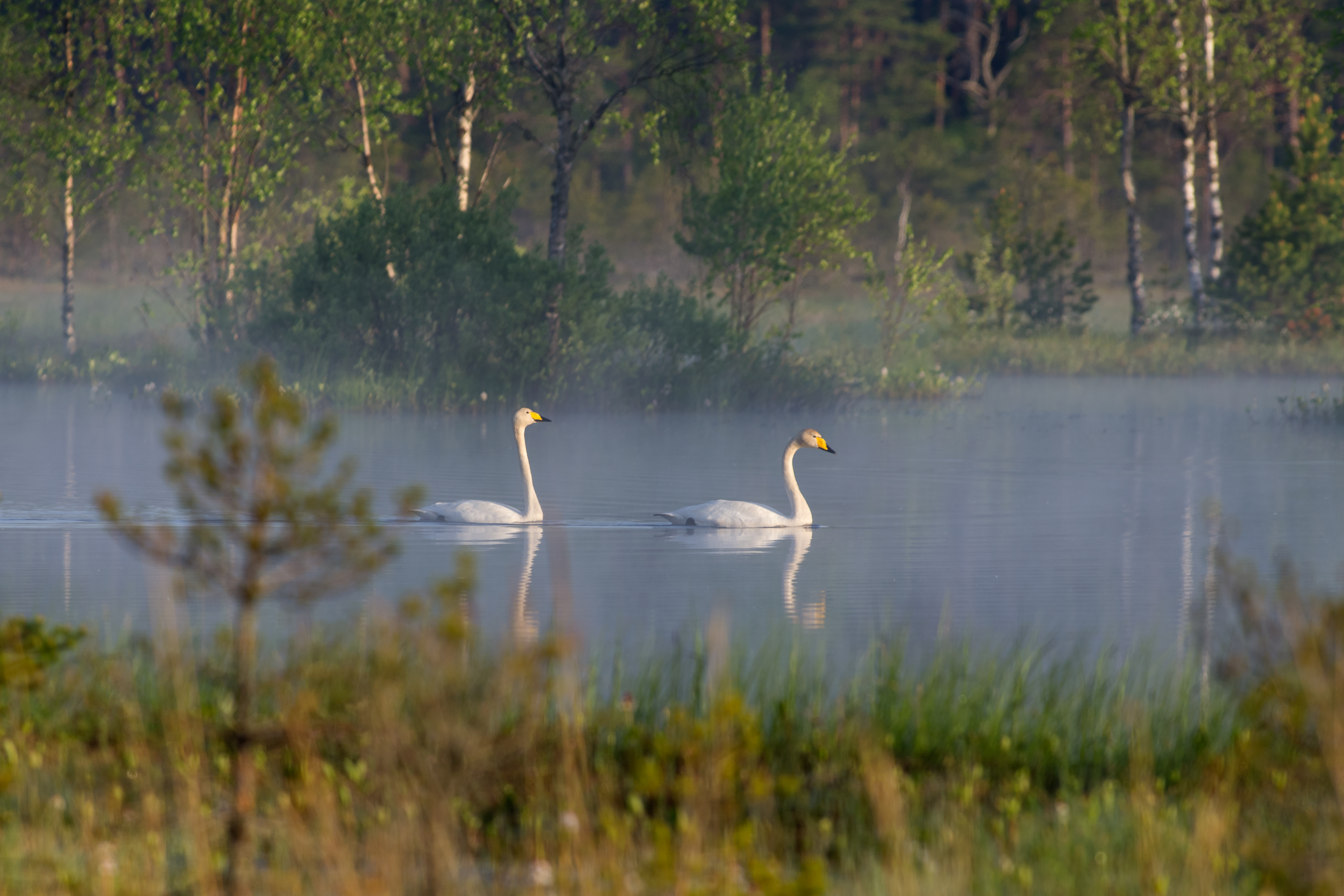
- Interactive map of Aude
- Country: Estonia
- County: Harju County
- Parish: Saue Parish
- Time zone: UTC+2 (EET)
  - Summer (DST): UTC+3 (EEST)

Aude is a village in Saue Parish, Harju County in northern Estonia.
