= Ellamaa =

Village in Estonia

Coordinates: 59°02′40″N 24°10′26″E

- Village
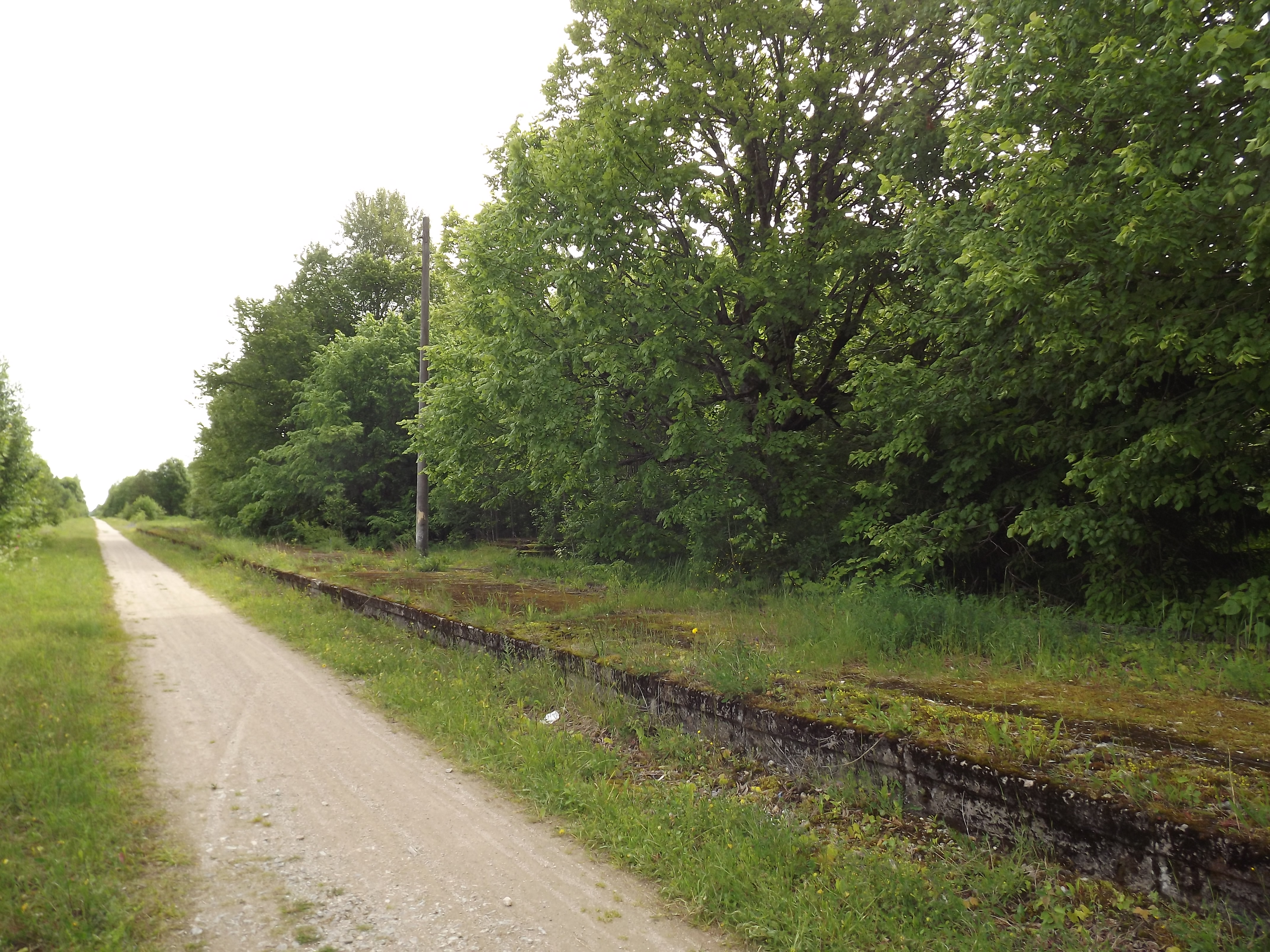
- Platform of the former Ellamaa railway station
- Interactive map of Ellamaa
- Country: Estonia
- County: Harju County
- Parish: Saue Parish
- Time zone: UTC+2 (EET)
  - Summer (DST): UTC+3 (EEST)

Ellamaa is a village in Saue Parish, Harju County in northern Estonia.
