= Kehra =

Town in Harju County, Estonia

- Town
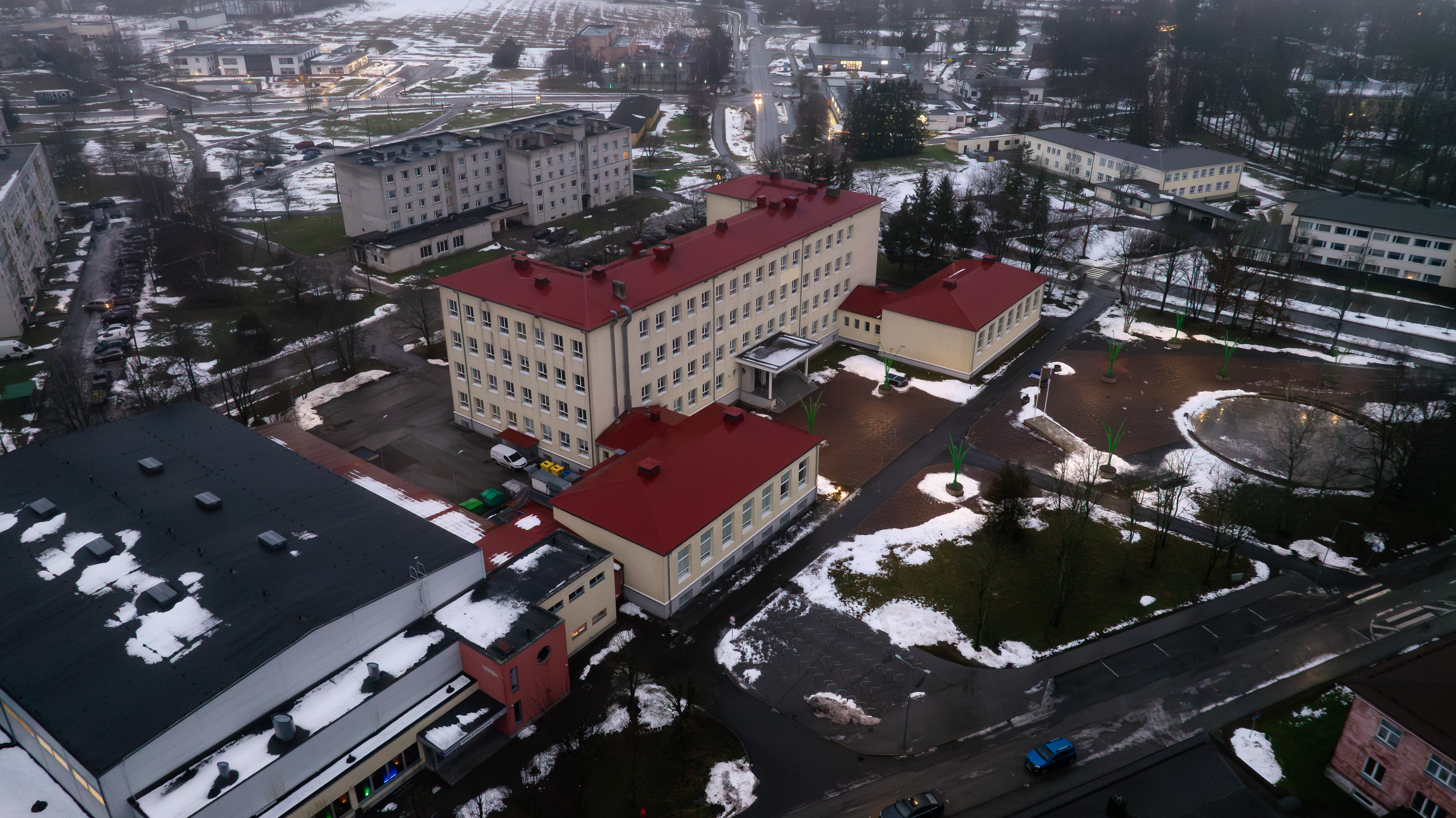
- Aerial view

- Location in Estonia
- Coordinates: 59°20′13″N 25°19′42″E
- Country: Estonia
- County: Harju County
- Municipality: Anija Parish
- First historical record: 1565
- Manor first mentioned: 1637
- Borough rights: 13 September 1945
- Town rights: 25 August 1993

Area
  - Total: 3.9 km^{2} (1.5 sq mi)
- Highest elevation: 56.0 m (183.7 ft)
- Lowest elevation: 40.0 m (131.2 ft)

Population (01.01.2024)
  - Total: 2,873
  - Rank: 32nd
  - Density: 740/km^{2} (1,900/sq mi)

Ethnicity (2021)
  - estonians: 54.6%
  - russians: 30.7%
  - ukrainians: 7.58%
  - other: 7.12%
- Time zone: UTC+2 (EET)
  - Summer (DST): UTC+3 (EEST)
- Postal Codes: 74301, 74305, 74306, 74307, 96114

Kehra is a town in Anija Parish, Harju County, Estonia, best known for its pulp and paper mill. The town stands on the banks of the Jägala River, and it has a station on the Tallinn–Narva railway. As of January 1, 2023, the town had a population of 2,694.

Drone video of Kehra, its paper mill, and the railway station

== Etymology ==
The village of Kehra, the town's namesake, was first mentioned in the Danish Census Book as Ketheræ in 1241. Before 1688, the village had also been referred to as Kecere, Kecnere, Kedere, Kederikull, Kedder, Keyher, Kether, Kädder(e) and Keddar. The village was known as both Kehrakyla and Käihra in 1688, and as Kehra in 1732

Kehra Manor, the town's predecessor, was first established sometime between 1624 and 1637, one kilometer south of the village. Initially it was known as Karrock Manor (Estonian: Karukse mõis), later as Jaunack Manor (Estonian: Jaunaku mõis), and by 1688 as Kedder Manor. The name stuck around until Estonia first became independent and place names were estonianized.

The following Estonian words are speculated to be the origins of the name Kehra:

- keder or kehr (local dialect) (English: spinning wheel)
- jõekäär, also compared to Käära farm in Kohatu, Estonia (English: meander)
- veekeeris, compared to Kehro in Finland (English: whirlpool)

== History ==
=== Early history ===
In 1940, excavations on the Andevei property in the village of Kehra uncovered a treasure containing 421 silver coins, most recent of which was minted in 978 AD. Out of the 421 coins, 411 were Samanid, 5 Byzantine, 3 German, 1 Anglo-Saxon, and 1 Bohemian. Remains of iron tools and pieces of earthenware were also found nearby. Based on this, it is speculated that the village of Kehra was settled at latest by the 11th century.

The village of Kehra was first mentioned in the Danish Census Book in 1241. According to the book, the village was a part of the Repel parish (Estonian: Rebala muinaskihelkond) and had a size of 10 oxgangs (Estonian: adramaa, German: hakken). Half of the village belonged to Lambertus and the other half to Stenhackær. The village was baptized either in 1219 or 1220, likely at the same time as the villages of Saunja, Soodla, Aavere, Anija, Kõlu, Pirsu, Kihmla, and Parila. In 1249, Kehra and Paasiku villages were given to the bishop of Tallinn, whose successors later founded Fegefyr Manor (Estonian: Kiviloo mõis).

According to the Swedish land audit of 1564–1565, the village of Kehra was part of Kiviloo Manor and had a size of 13 oxgangs. The village of Jaunack (Janakas, Jannikkas) was first mentioned in the same audit. It was near the mouth of the Aavoja river and had a size of two oxgangs. Kehra and Karrock mills were also first mentioned in the same audit. Kehra mill (Kedder quarn) was located 100 meters upstream from the current car bridge, in the north-eastern corner of the current pulp and paper mill. For some time around the end of the 17th century, the mill was temporarily located 100 meters upstream from the mouth of the Aavoja river, near the village of Jaunack. The mill in its original location was demolished in 1936 to make room for the pulp mill that was going to be built. Karukse mill (Karockas quarn) was likely located around 20–50 meters upstream from the current medical center, near the mouth of the hypothetical Karukse stream and was demolished at an undetermined time.

=== Manor ===
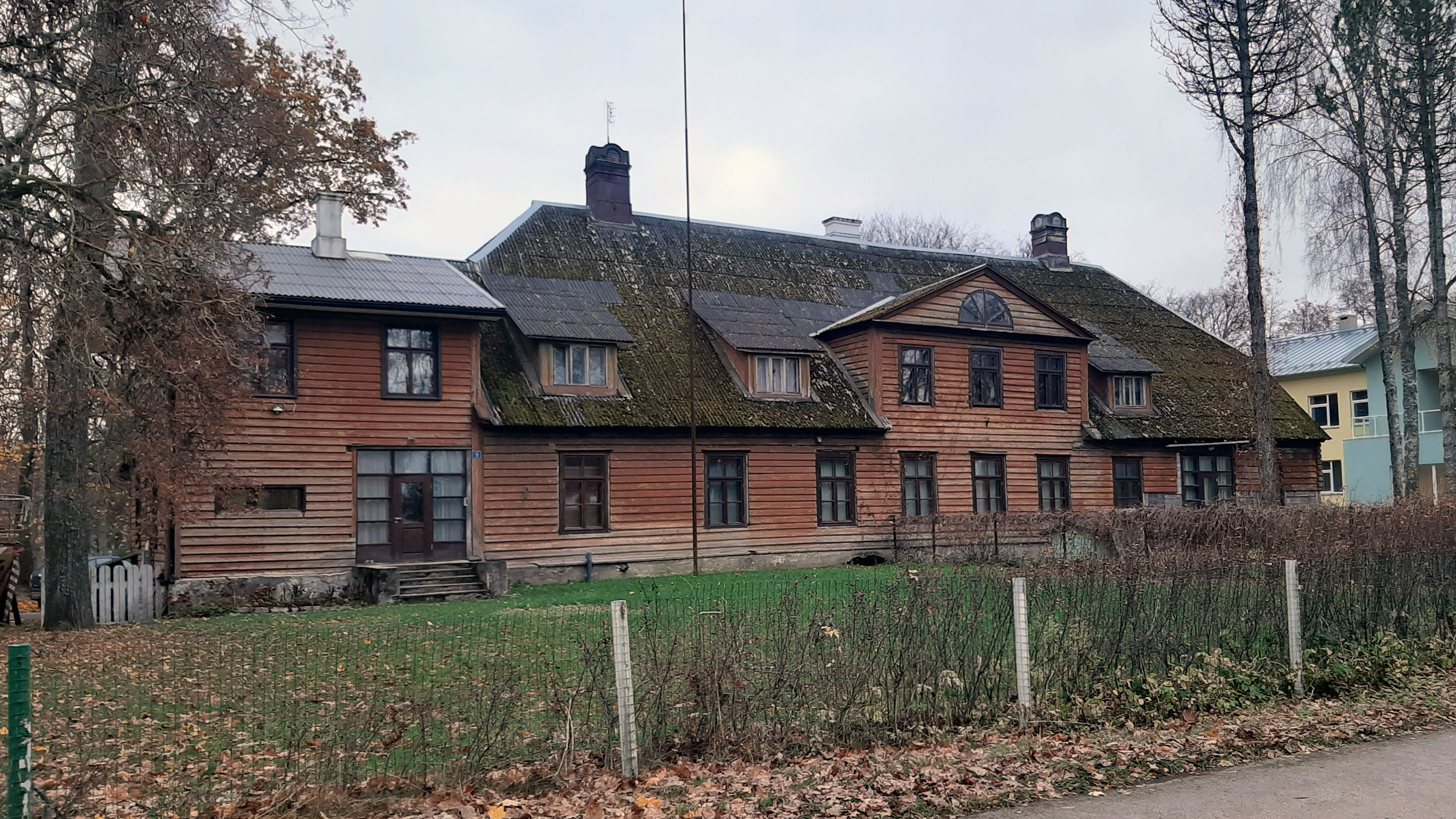
Kehra Manor in 2020

The fief on which Kehra Manor would be built was granted to Euphemia Kriedt in 1624. In 1637, the recently built manor was owned by Kriedt's son-in-law, Heinrich Bade. Kriedt's grandson-in-law, Gabriel von Elvering, gained ownership of even more fiefs in the 1660s and according to a 1692 map, the manor's lands stretched as far east as Maapaju border point near the current Mustjõe train station. Reitevahe (Arudevahe) inn, which was near the current Lahinguvälja train station, was also a part of the manor.

Von Elverings regained ownership of the manor after the Great Northern War, but were forced to sell it in 1760 to cover debts. Von Breverns, the new owners, lent the manor to Friedrich August von Maydell in the spring of 1820, who subsequently bought it. The manor was rebuilt in the 1820s and is still standing. In 1847, the manor was sold to Dietrich Johann Georg von Tiesenhausen, who sold it to Alexander Georg Matthias von Essen in 1855. In 1864, he gifted the manor to his daughter, Margarethe Gertrude Henriette von Ulrich. Her daughter, Marie Jeanette Katharina von Ulrich, inherited the manor in 1904, when her mother died.

Marie Ulrich gave control of the manor's economic side to the Estonian Agricultural Society (Estonian: Eestimaa Põllumajanduse Selts) at the end of the 19th century. The manor started expanding westwards, to the other side of the current Kreutzwaldi street. The manor's granary was built in 1876, the grain dryer in 1912, and the stables in 1914. Currently, Kehra ait, the cultural center, and sewing factory are located in these buildings, respectively. The agricultural society gained full ownership of the manor in 1914. Marie Ulrich continued to live in the manor until she died on June 27, 1926. The manor was nationalized on May 7, 1926.

The state manor drained the nearby wetlands and distributed the land to people for building and farming. The manor was sold to the pulp mill in 1937. On August 3, 1940, Kehra sovkhoz was formed to replace the state manor. When German forces occupied Kehra, the sovkhoz became the state manor again. On April 18, 1945, the state manor was converted back into a sovkhoz one last time. Now under the Soviet rule, the manor building was used as a nursery until 1956, and as a hospital between 1956 and 1994. The sovkhoz ceased operations on July 17, 1995. The manor is currently privately owned.

=== Education ===
==== School ====
Students in Kehra school
Year	Pop.	±% p.a.
1851	85	—
1863*	32	−7.82%
1913*	50	+0.90%
1928	95	+4.37%
1938	156	+5.08%
1956	700	+8.70%
1972	998	+2.24%
1994	777	−1.13%
1999	771	−0.15%
2002	732	−1.72%
2005	625	−5.13%
2009	520	−4.49%
2014	440	−3.29%
2017	423	−1.30%
2020*	462	+2.98%
2023*	487	+1.77%
*approximation Source: A. Miidla, Kehra Lood p. 360-365 S. Milvi, Kehra külakool 1850-1918 S. Milvi, Kehra kool 1918-1945 Kehra gümnaasiumi arengukava 2009-2014, 2014-2017, 2018-2022 Anija valla arengukava 2003

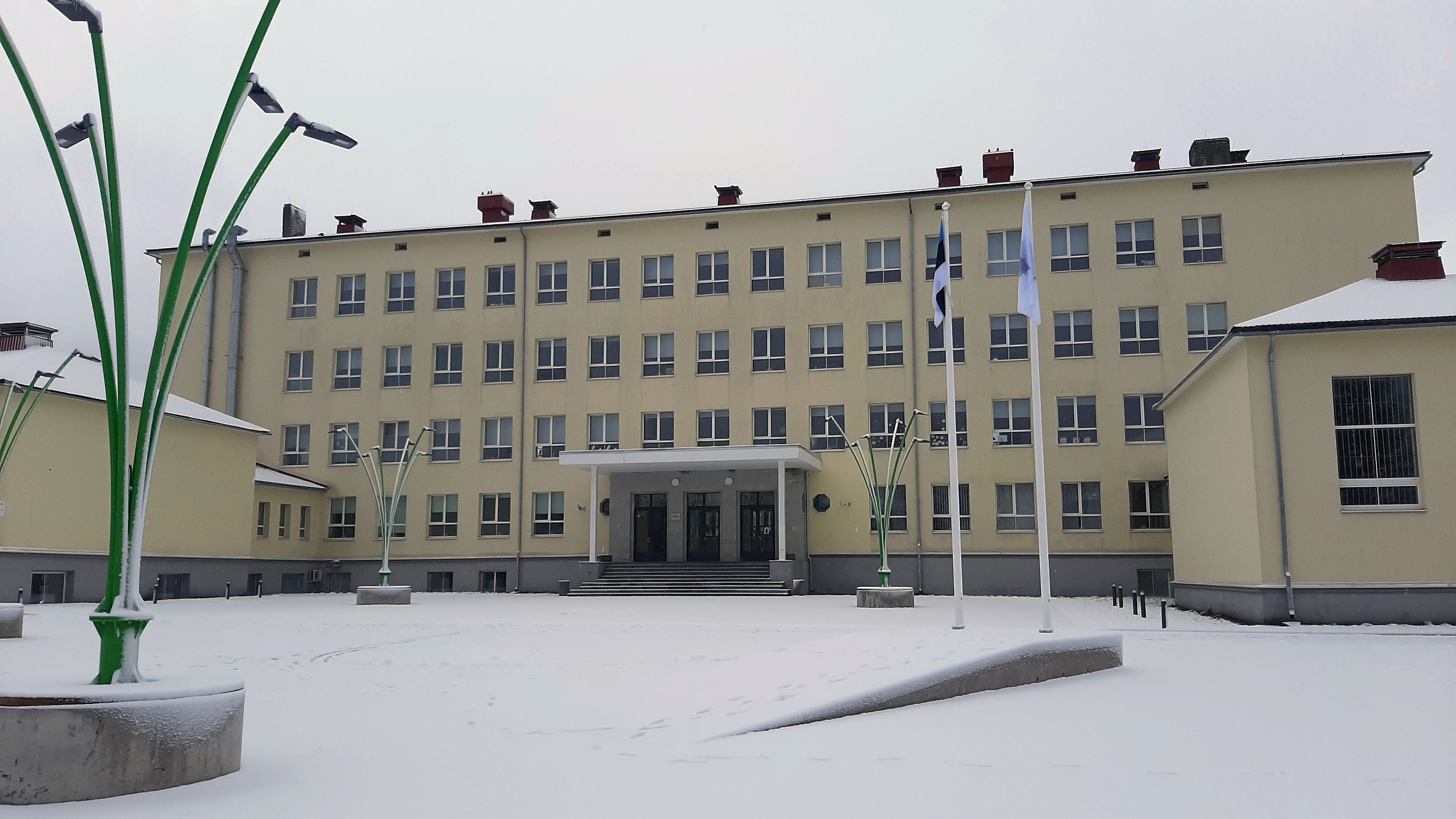
Kehra Gymnasium

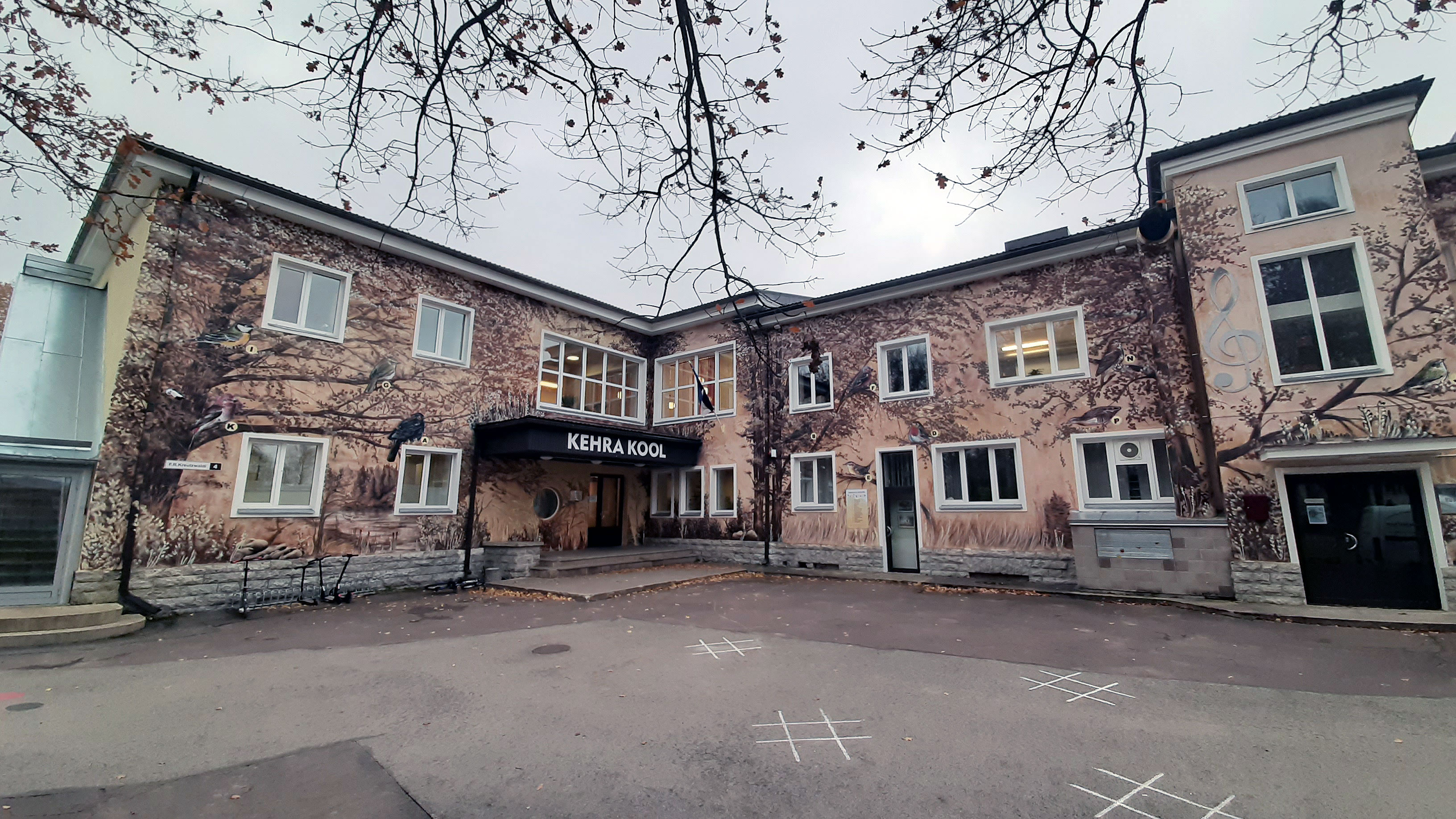
Kehra Elementary School

The first school in Harju-Jaani parish started operating in 1717 in Raasiku. The graduates subsequently spread their knowledge to others in the parish, including people from the Kehra area. The first school in the village of Kehra was established in 1738, and it operated inconsistently. It is claimed that in 1785, Kehra school was the worst school in Harju-Jaani parish, and by 1787, it had ceased operations, as had several other schools in the parish. The first school that started operating consistently was opened in fall 1850, a few days before St. Martin's Day, according to a first-hand account. According to the official list of schools in the Estonian Governorate in 1886, the school was founded in 1848. The school was located on the land of the current Koolitoa property in the village of Kehra. A new building was built for the school on the same property in 1878, because the previous building was in a bad state. According to Gustav Vilbaste, the school's teacher between 1904 and 1913, the school had three grades and around 30-50 students. The school became a four grade school in 1918 due to a nation-wide school reform.

On November 1, 1919, the school moved and started operating just north of the current train station, on the current property of Anija maantee 2. The building was made out of wood and had two stories. It was built in 1914 and destroyed during the second world war. Since 1928, the school had five grades, and six grades since 1930.

On October 8, 1939, the school started operating in the newly built property on Kreutzwaldi street, where the elementary school currently operates. The school became an incomplete middle school (Estonian: mittetäielik keskkool) in 1944, and a middle school in 1946. Russian grades were opened in 1947.

On October 8, 1961, the school started operating in the new, four-story building on Kooli street. The previous school building became a dormitory for the students. A new dormitory was built in 1975, and the elementary school started operating in the now free rooms. Since 1988, the school has had 12 grades. The dormitory was closed in 1998, and its rooms are currently occupied by the local government. The school became a gymnasium in 2007. The gymnasium building was renovated in 2012, and the elementary school building was renovated sporadically between 2013 and 2018. The surroundings of the gymnasium were thoroughly renovated in 2020.

==== Agricultural school ====
There were plans to establish an agricultural school in Kehra in 1914. For a short amount of time in 1921, the school operated in Kehra. Keila agricultural school was transferred to Kehra Manor in 1934, where it operated until 1937, when the manor was sold to the pulp mill. Kehra agricultural specialty school (Estonian: Kehra põllumajandusliku kallakuga täienduskool) was opened in 1939.

==== Harjumaa Folk University ====
Harjumaa Folk University (Estonian: Harjumaa Rahvaülikool), headed by Johan Ümarik, started operating in Kehra Manor on February 26, 1930. The curriculum was diverse, some lectures had over 100 spectators, most of them locals. The university moved to Ravila in fall 1932, due to better conditions.

==== Arts school ====
The school was established as a music school (Estonian: Kehra Laste-Muusikakool) on August 16, 1962. It operated in the gymnasium building. In 1970, one part of the arts school was moved to the pulp mill club and the other part to the basement of the Spordi 3 property. The school gained three rooms in the current elementary school in 1975. The school started teaching visual arts in 1989. In 1990, the entire school moved to Kose maantee 22. In 1991, the school was renamed to Kehra School of Fine Arts (Estonian: Kehra Kunstidekool). The whole school started operating in the same building as the elementary school in 2013.

==== Kindergartens ====
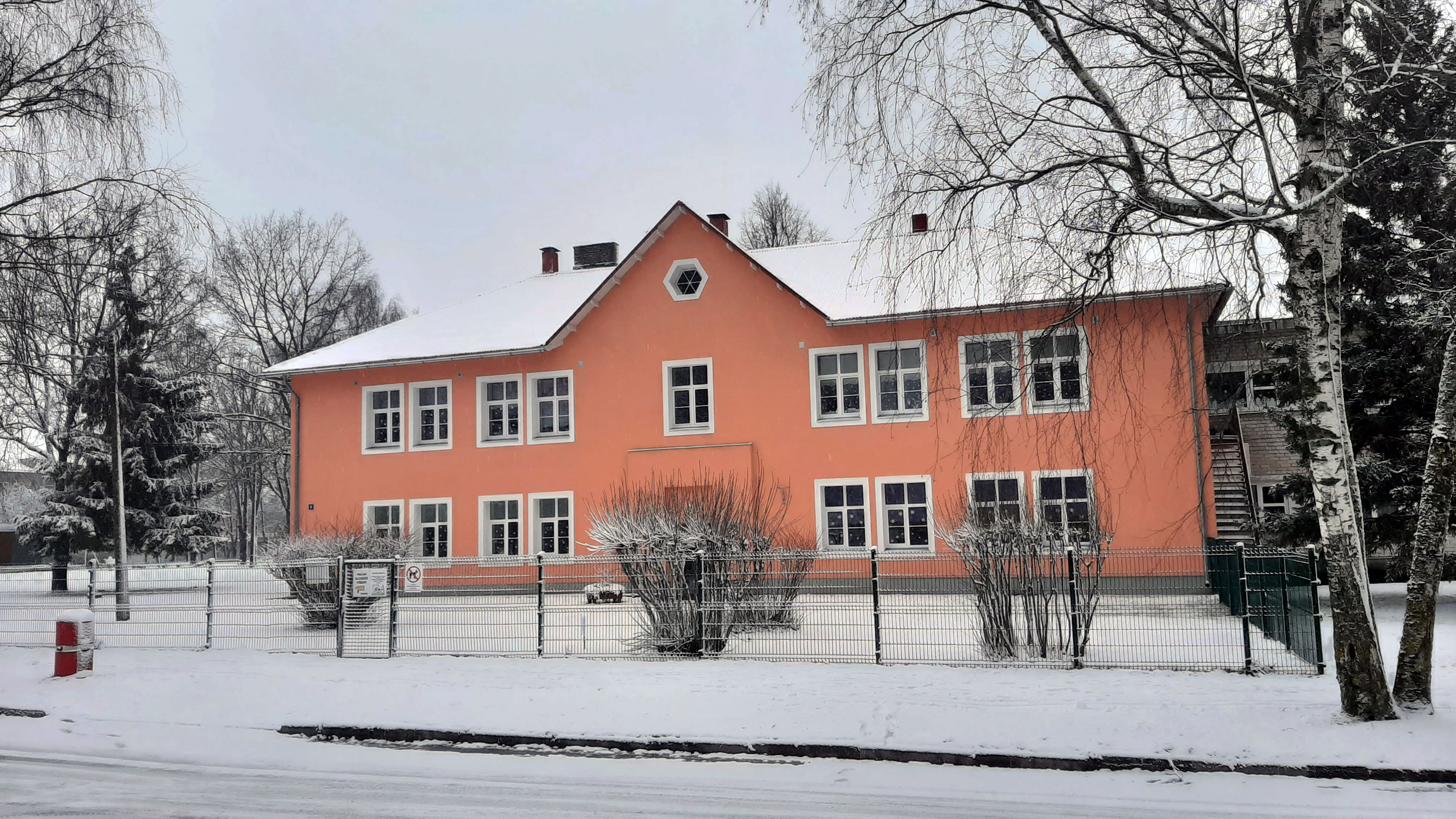
Kindergarten Lastetare

The first kindergarten started operating in Kehra Manor in 1946. It was operated by the pulp mill. A new building for the kindergarten was built on Laste street in 1954. The kindergarten and the local nursery were merged in 1972, the resulting establishment became known as Kehra Tselluloosi- ja Paberikombinaadi lastepäevakodu. The local sovkhoz opened kindergarten Lepatriinu on March 1, 1980, in Lehtmetsa village. The pulp mill's kindergarten was temporarily closed in 1992 because the pulp mill went bankrupt. The pulp mill's kindergarten became known as Lastetare in 1995. Currently both kindergartens are operated by Anija parish.

=== Railway ===
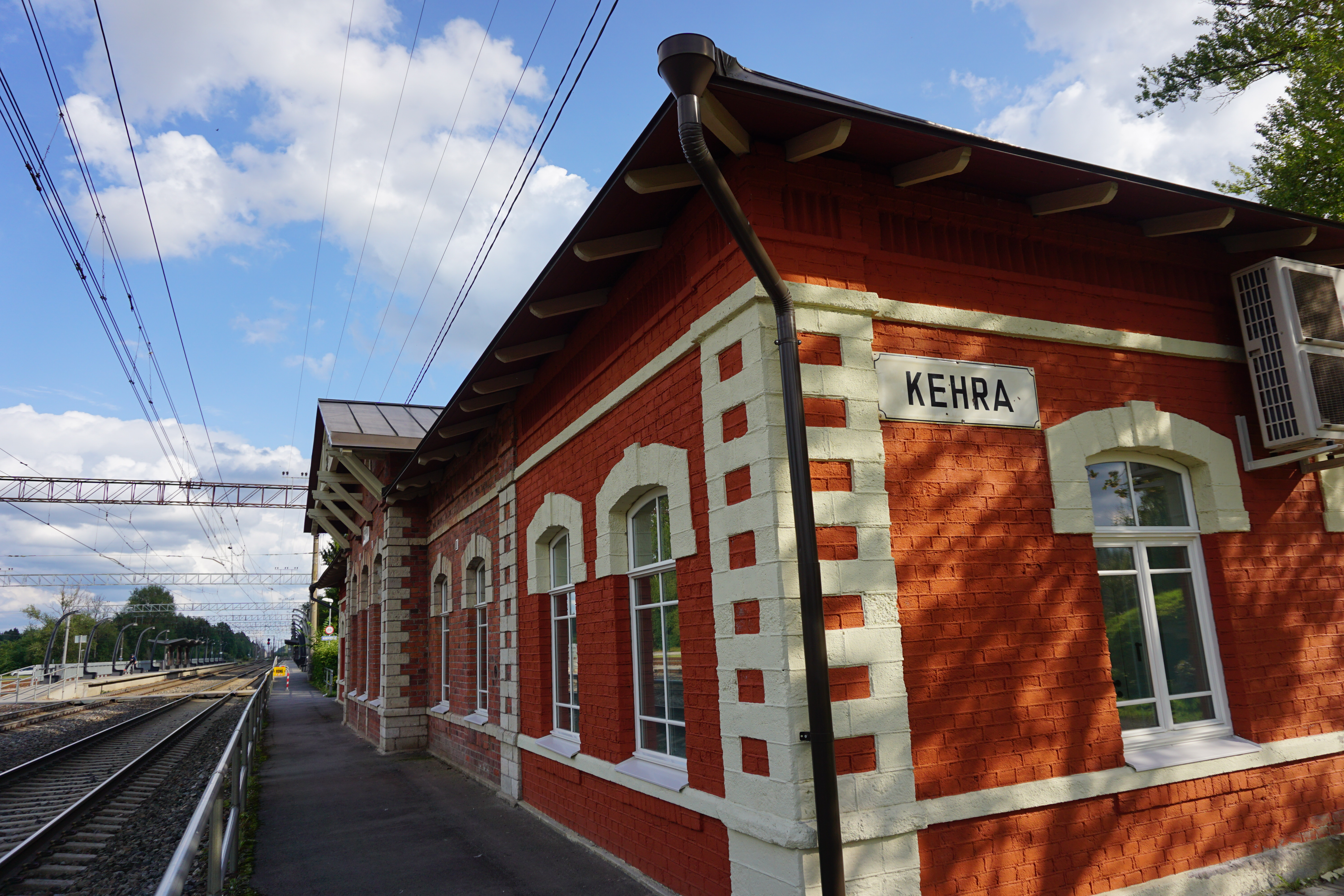
Kehra station building

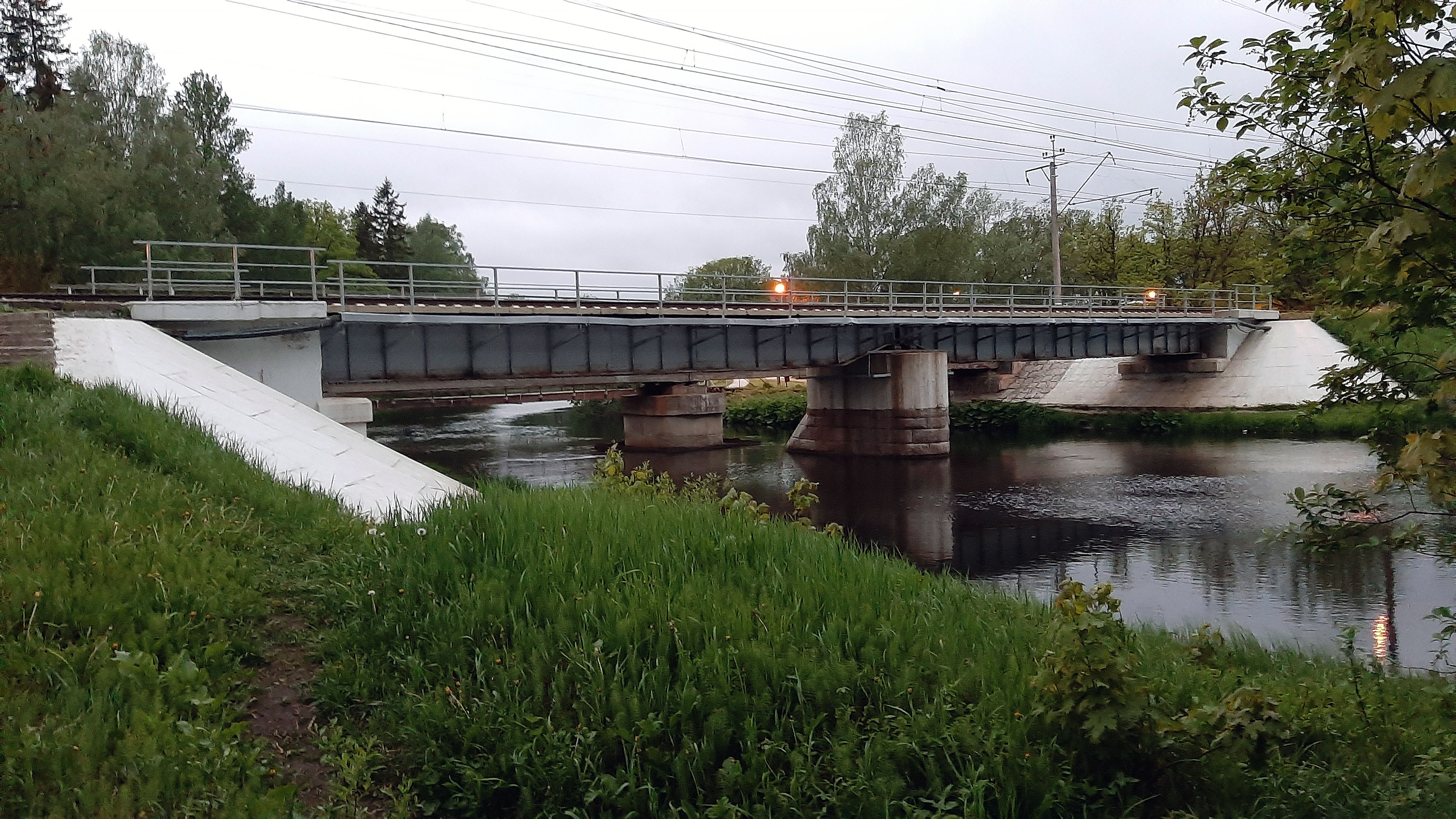
Kehra railway bridge

The route of the St. Petersburg-Tallinn-Paldiski railway was agreed upon by 1862, and it was built between 1869 and 1870. Kehra station was opened in 1872. The railway approximately divided the lands of the manor and the village, and roughly followed the old winter road between Kehra and Aegviidu. The initial station building was located closer to the river than the current one. It was demolished in the first half of the 20th century.

The current train station building was first alleged to have been built between 1876 and 1878, after Kehra became a class V railway station in 1876, but newer data suggests that the train station was built in 1896 instead. It is a single-story historistic red brick building with a half-hip roof. Similar buildings used to exist in Kohtla-Nõmme and Auvere, one still exists in Lehtse. Kehra became a class IV railway station in 1922 and a class III station in 1927.

First Estonian Division used the station as their headquarters in late 1918 and early 1919, during the Estonian War of Independence. The Battle of Kehra took place in the nearby village of Vikipalu on January 4, 1919, being one of the decisive battles of the war of independence. In fall 1936, a railway branch was built to connect the future Kehra pulp mill to the main railway. On March 25, 1949, 801 people were deported to Siberia from the station, of whom 108 were from the former Anija Parish.

The station building was elongated in both directions in 1961 and was renovated in 1963. The current pedestrian railway crossing was closed to cars when the construction of Kose-Jägala highway was finished in 1972. The railway between Kehra and Tallinn was electrified in 1973, and a new waiting platform was built 200 meters towards Tallinn from the former station. The railway between Kehra and Aegviidu was electrified in 1978. The second pair of rails between Raasiku and Kehra was laid in 1985 and was electrified in 1986. In fall 2002, half of the waiting platform was demolished and never rebuilt. The new waiting platforms were built between the station building and the current pedestrian railway crossing. Trains started servicing them on December 5, 2011. The old waiting platform was demolished shortly after.

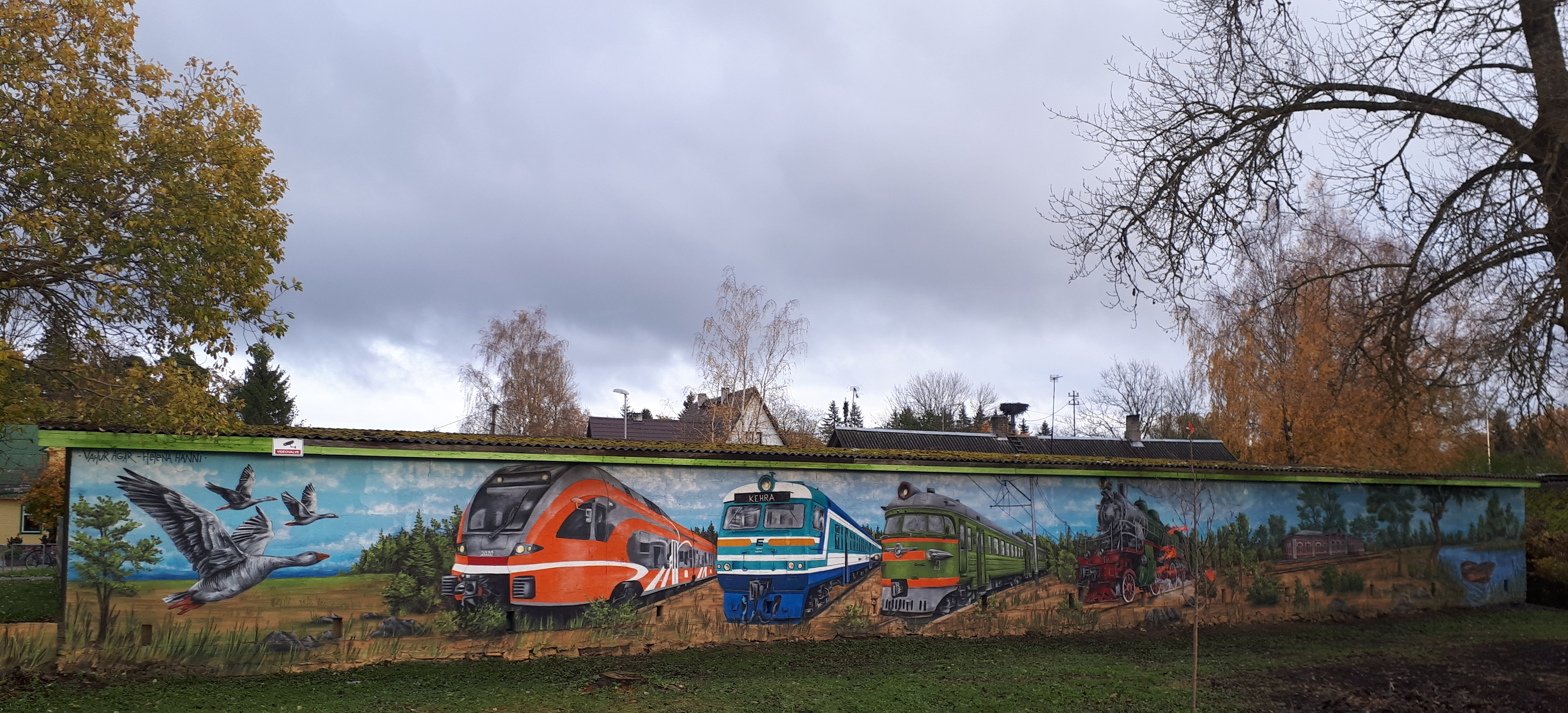
Train mural in Kehra

Elektriraudtee AS gained ownership of the station building after Estonia regained its independence and started selling train tickets there. In November 1997, the sale of tickets moved onto trains, and on April 13, 1998, the company sold the building to the town for 33 604 Estonian kroons. Anija Parish and non-profit organization Kehra Raudteejaam entered into a usufruct agreement regarding the building in February 2010. Kehra Museum has operated in the building since February 12, 2018, and a pizza shop has operated in the eastern part of the building since August 1, 2018. The building was fully renovated by 2019.

Mustjõe station was first mentioned on the Estonian topographic map of 1935. An oxygen factory started operating there in 1937. The station ceased operating at some point and was reopened in 1978, when the railway was electrified. Lahinguvälja station was opened in 1939, near the place, where the battle of Kehra took place. The station was renamed to Vikipalu in 1957 and back to Lahinguvälja in 2009. Parila station was opened in 1973, when the railway was electrified.

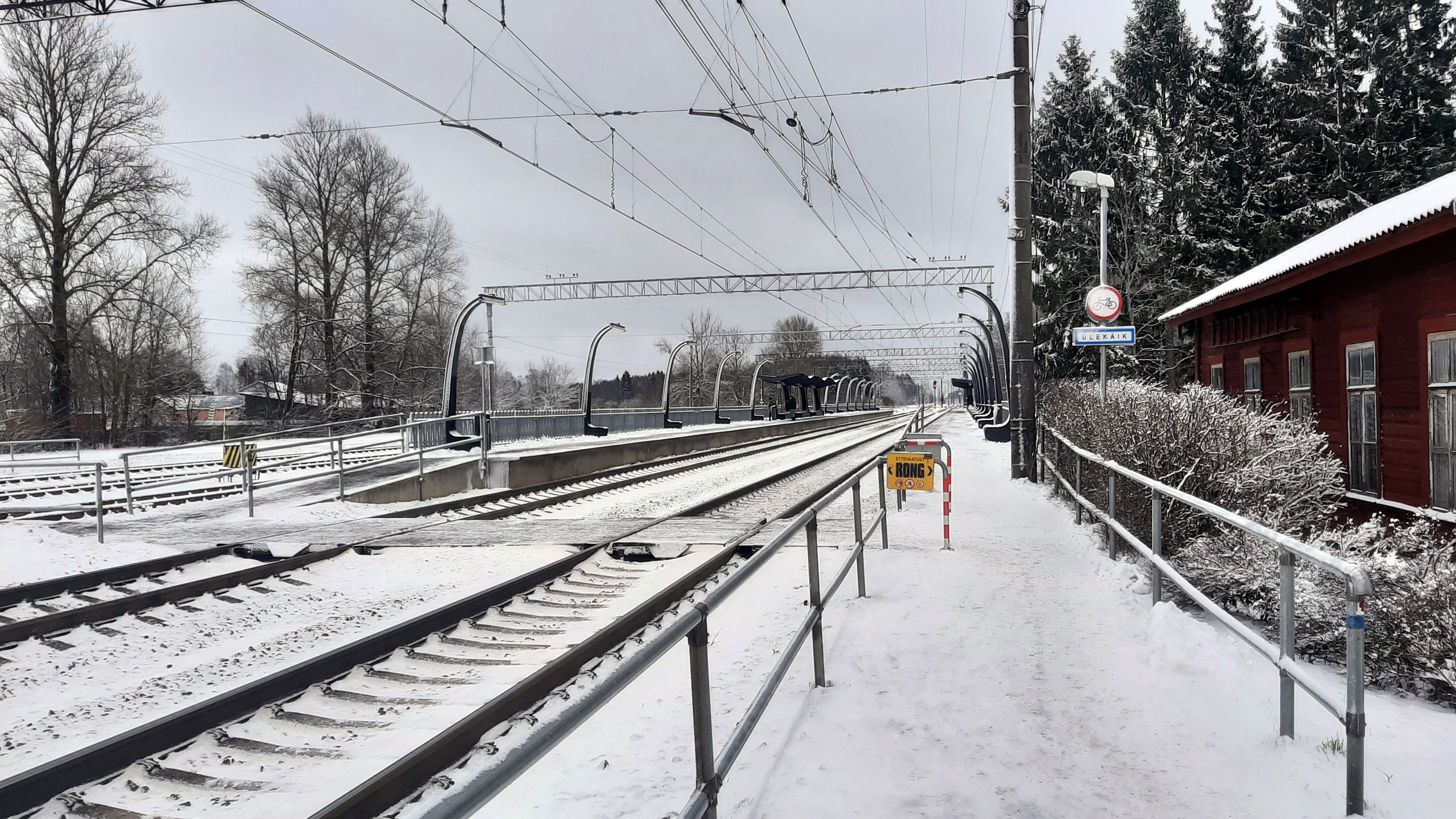
Waiting platforms

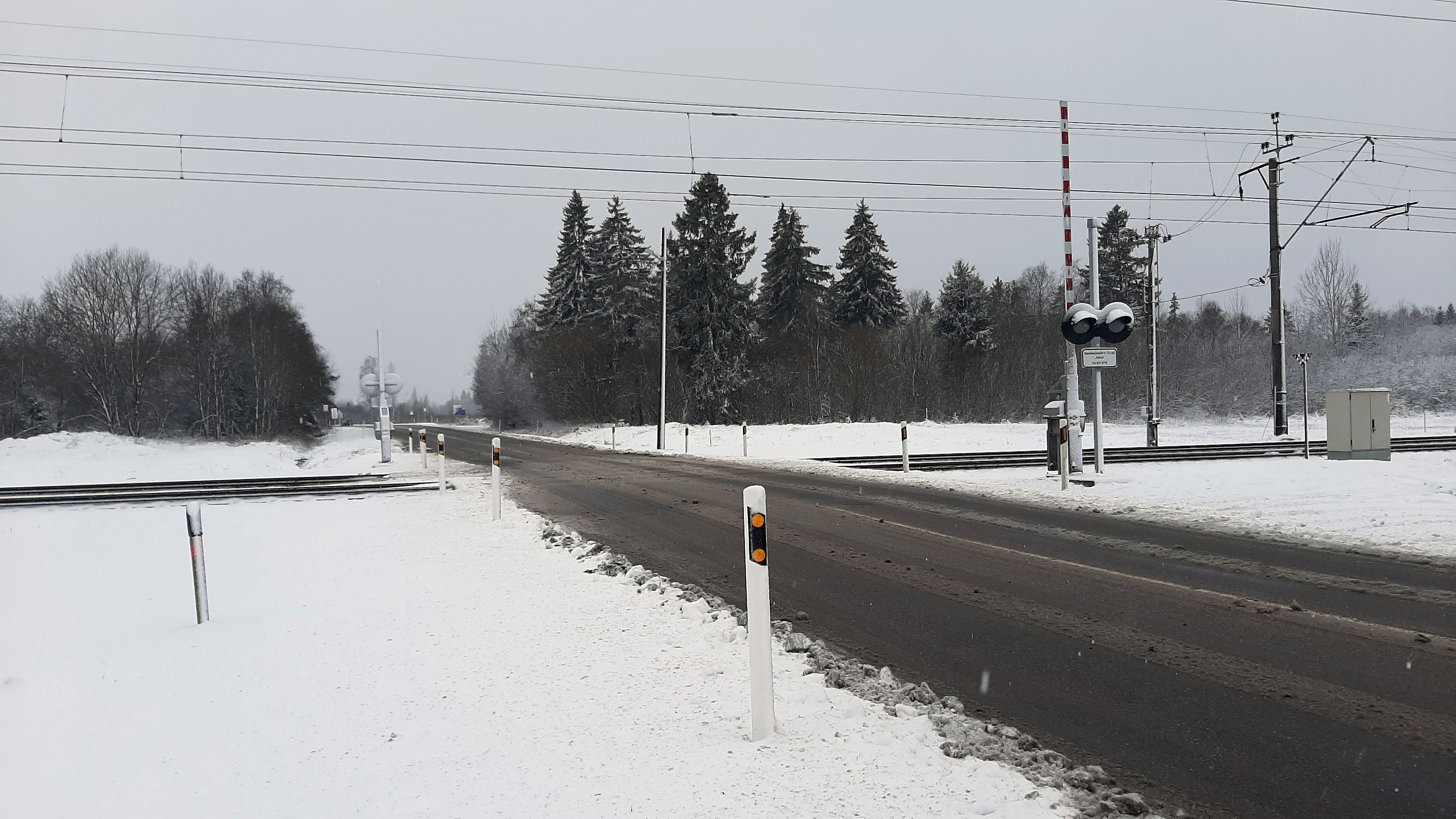
Railway crossing on Kose-Jägala highway

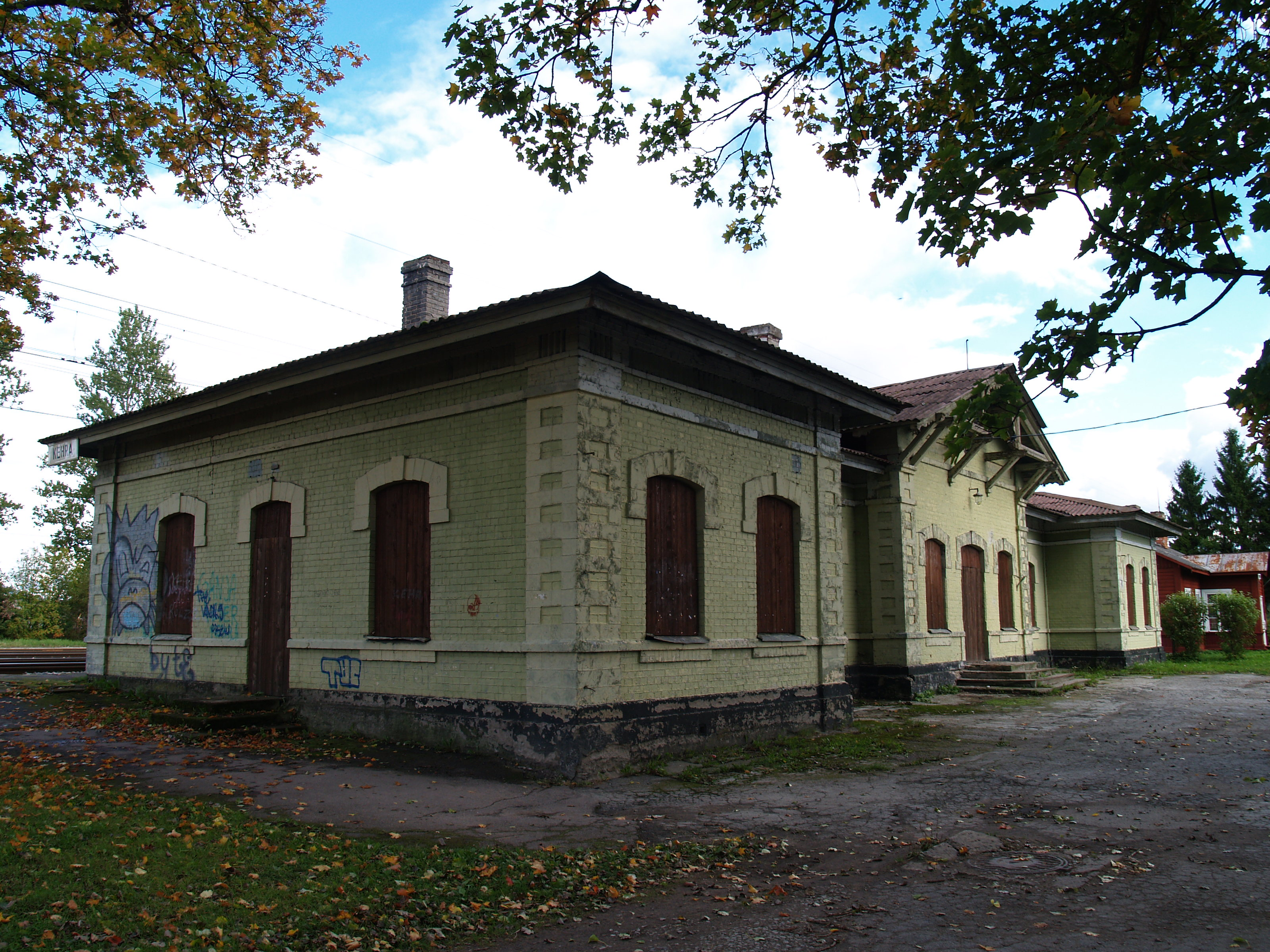
Kehra station in 2010

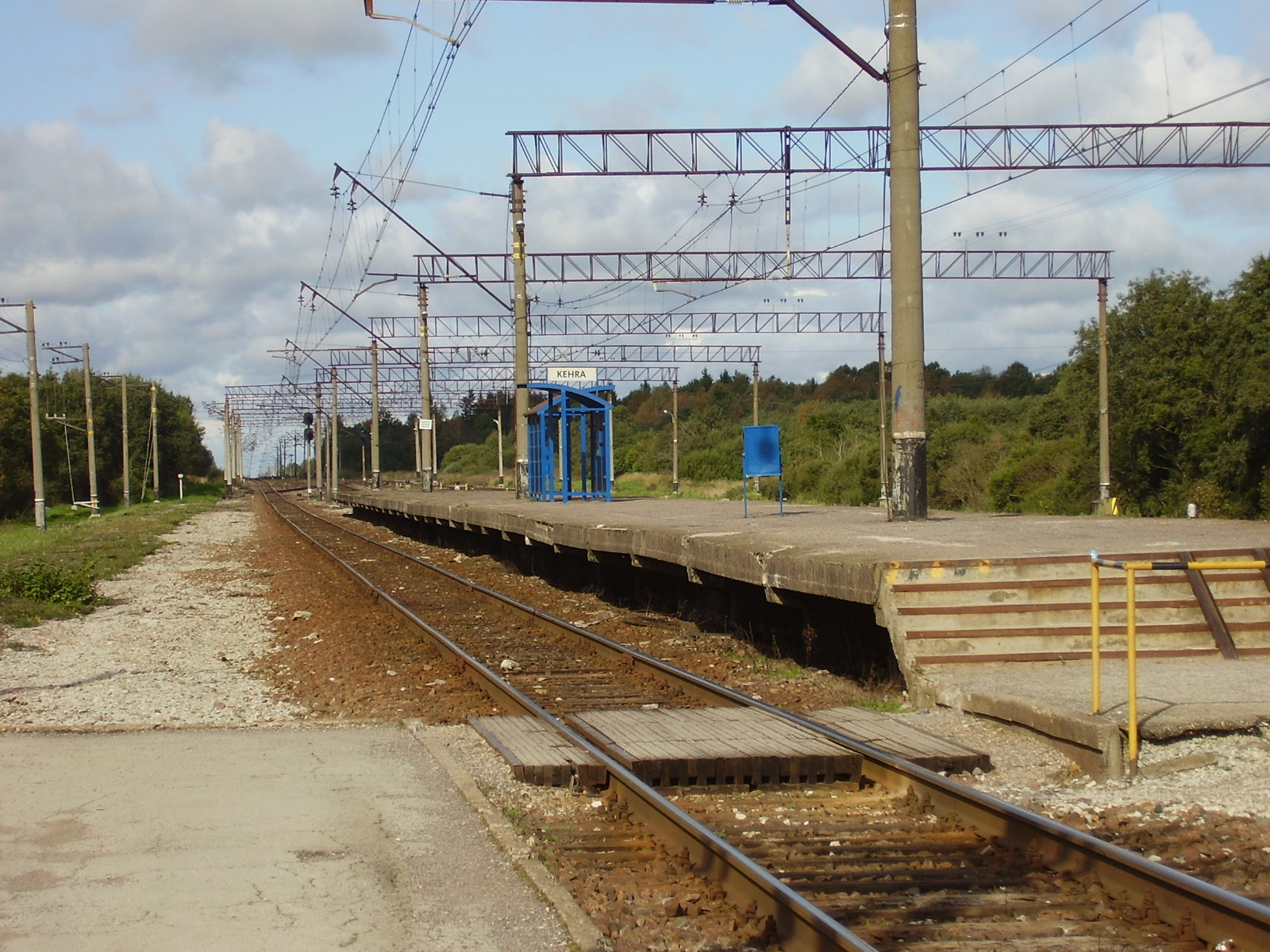
Old waiting platform

=== Pulp Mill ===
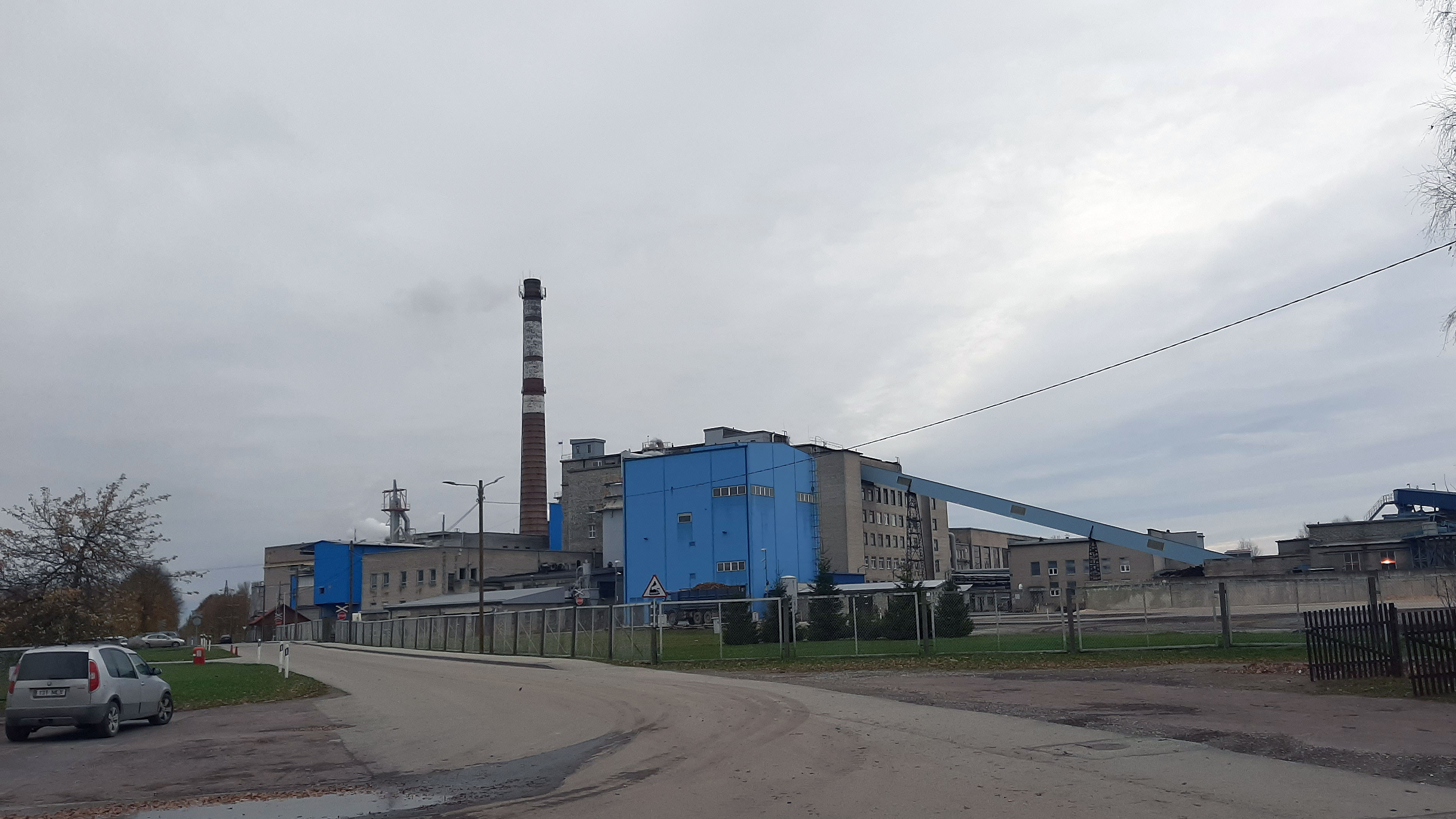
Kehra pulp mill

In the 1930s, the Estonian state had plans to build a new modern pulp mill that could process pine. On September 28, 1936, Kehra was chosen as the location of the new pulp mill due to its proximity to the railway, a river, and the capital city. In addition to that, most of the land was already owned by the state. Eesti Metsa ja Tselluloosi Aktsiaühing was formed to operate the pulp mill. It was the largest company established during the first independence of Estonia. Construction of the pulp mill began in 1937 and ended in 1938. The opening event took place on August 25, 1938. It was attended by Konstantin Päts, Johan Laidoner, and Kaarel Eenpalu, among many other important officials. 11700 and 34400 tons of sulphate cellulose were manufactured in 1938 and 1939, respectively. The pulp mill had 464 workers in 1939. The pulp mill seriously polluted the Jägala River, killing most of fishes downstream from the mill.

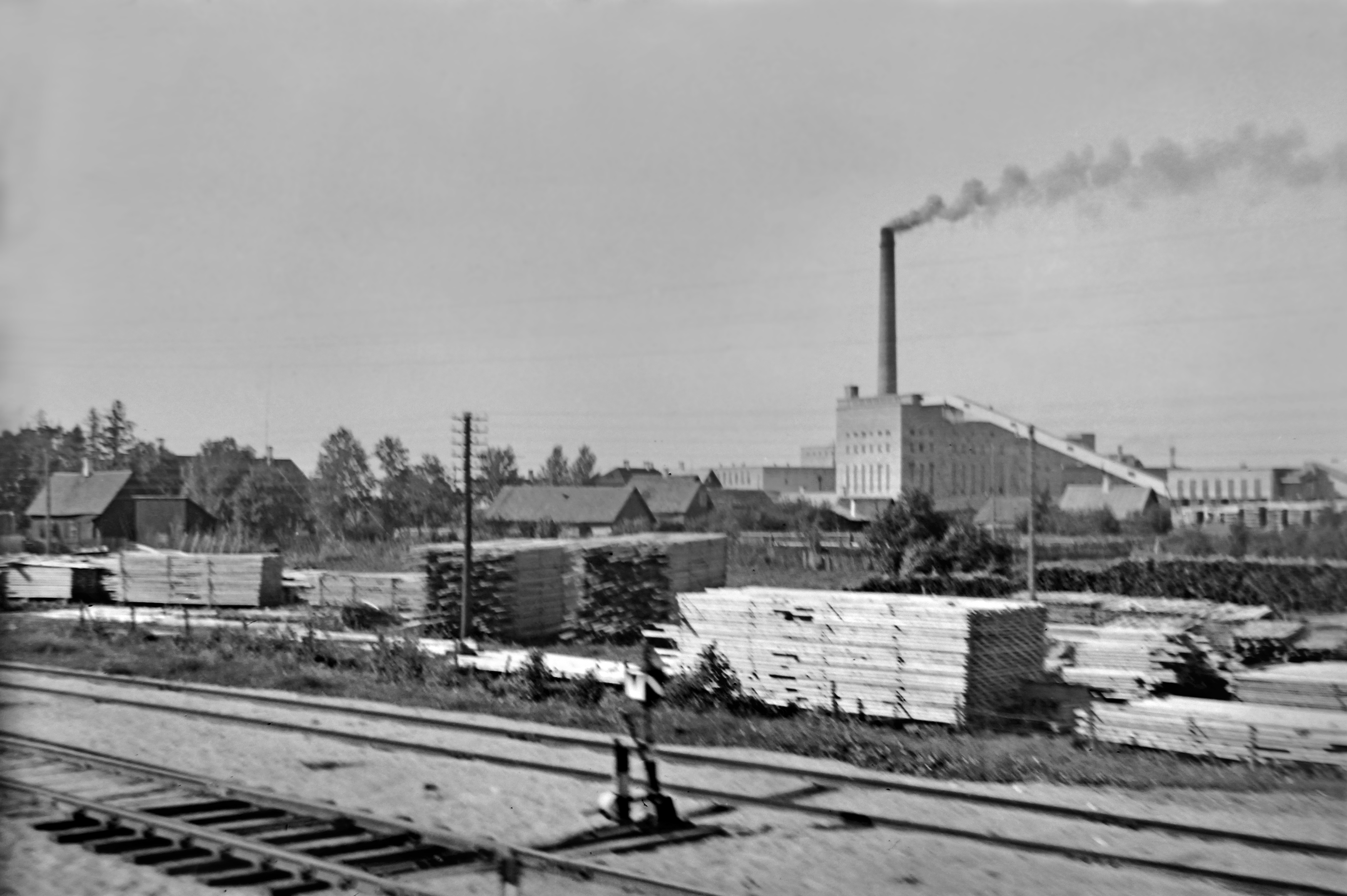
Kehra pulp mill in 1940

The pulp mill's chimney, dam and other parts were destroyed by the red army on August 21, 1941. The chimney was rebuilt during the German occupation in October 1942, and the mill started operating again in the summer of 1943. The Germans wanted to destroy the pulp mill in September 1944, before leaving Kehra, but did not succeed.

During the German occupation, a POW camp was established to restore the destroyed pulp mill. It was likely a subsidiary of the Tapa POW camp. According to Arthur Puksov, the director of the mill at the time, the prisoners were treated well. According to German records, around 100 prisoners died due to illnesses between 1941 and 1942, and 11 were shot on escape. The camp operated until September 18, 1944. Eight camp officials were convicted in 1945 and one in 1966.

After the war, the pulp mill produced electricity for Tallinn and heated buildings in Kehra. By 1955, the pulp mill had reached pre-war production level and started producing kraft paper. The mill started producing sewn paper sacks in 1957 and glued paper sacks in 1962. The pulp mill began treating its wastewater biologically in 1977, which significantly improved the condition of the Jägala River. In 1988, the mill produced 55 000 tons of cellulose, 48 500 tons of paper, 120 million paper bags, 450 tons of adhesive tape, and 400 tons of crêpe paper. The mill had 1065 workers, of whom 270 were Estonian.

After Estonia regained independence, the mill became known as Kehra Paber. The production halted on November 13, 1992, due to breakage in the recovery boiler. The company declared bankruptcy on March 1, 1993. Tolaram Group acquired the mill in June 1995 and the factory was renamed to Horizon Pulp & Paper Ltd. The mill started producing the well-known "Daisy" tissue paper on June 4, 1998. Lennart Meri visited Kehra on the same day. Tolaram Group became a 100% shareholder of the mill in 2008.

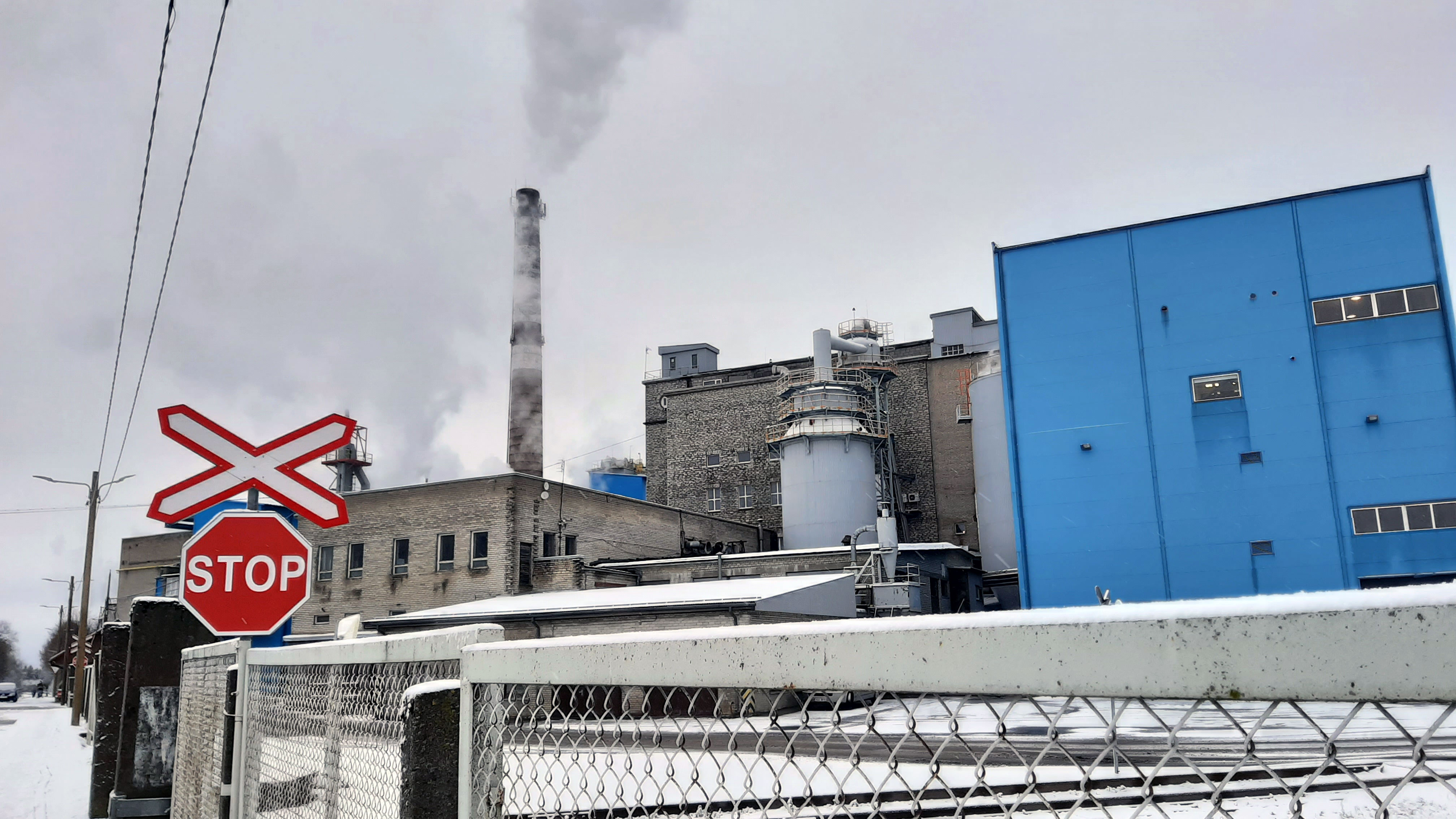
Kehra pulp mill closer

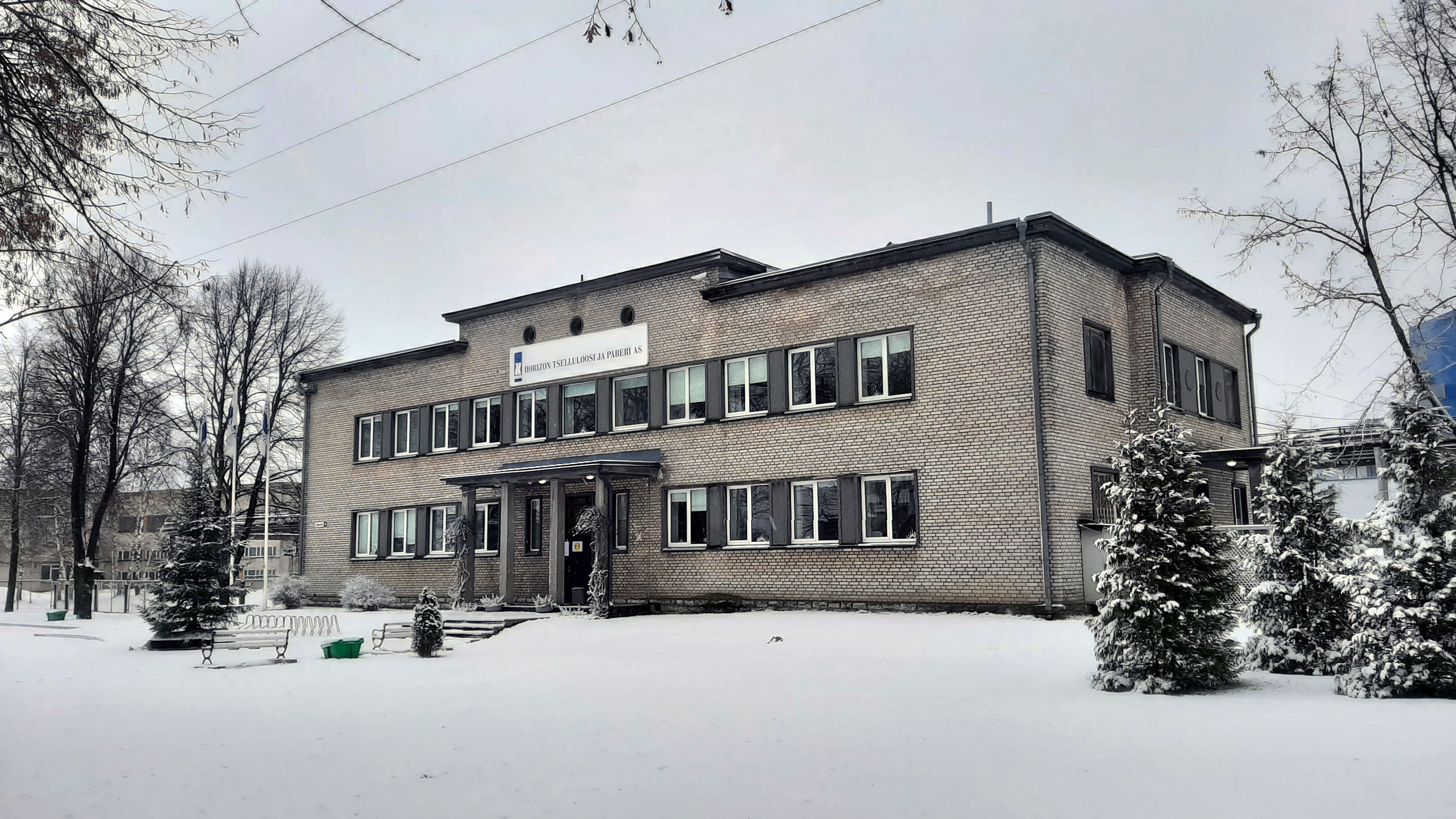
Management building

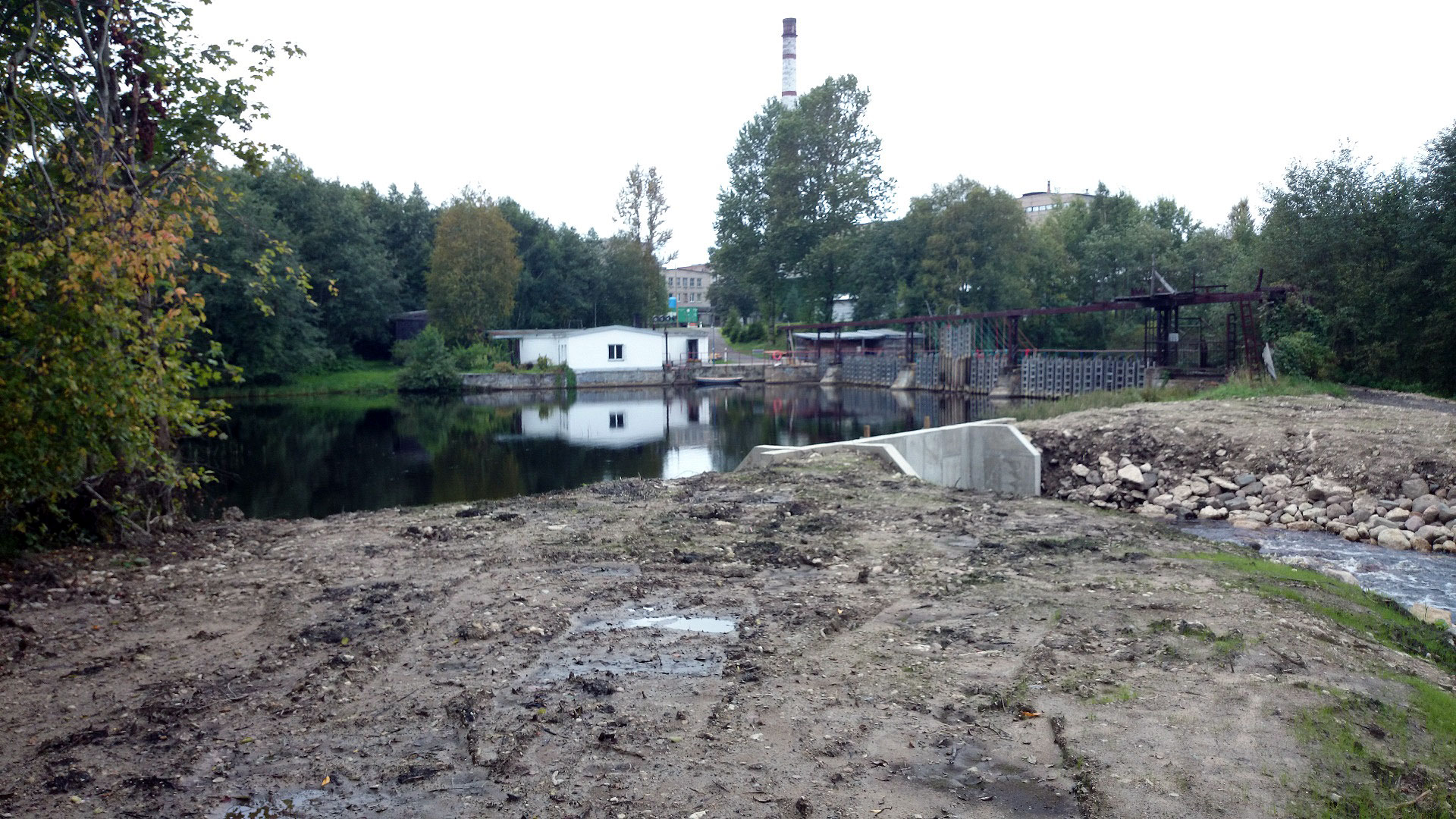
Pulp mill dam upstream

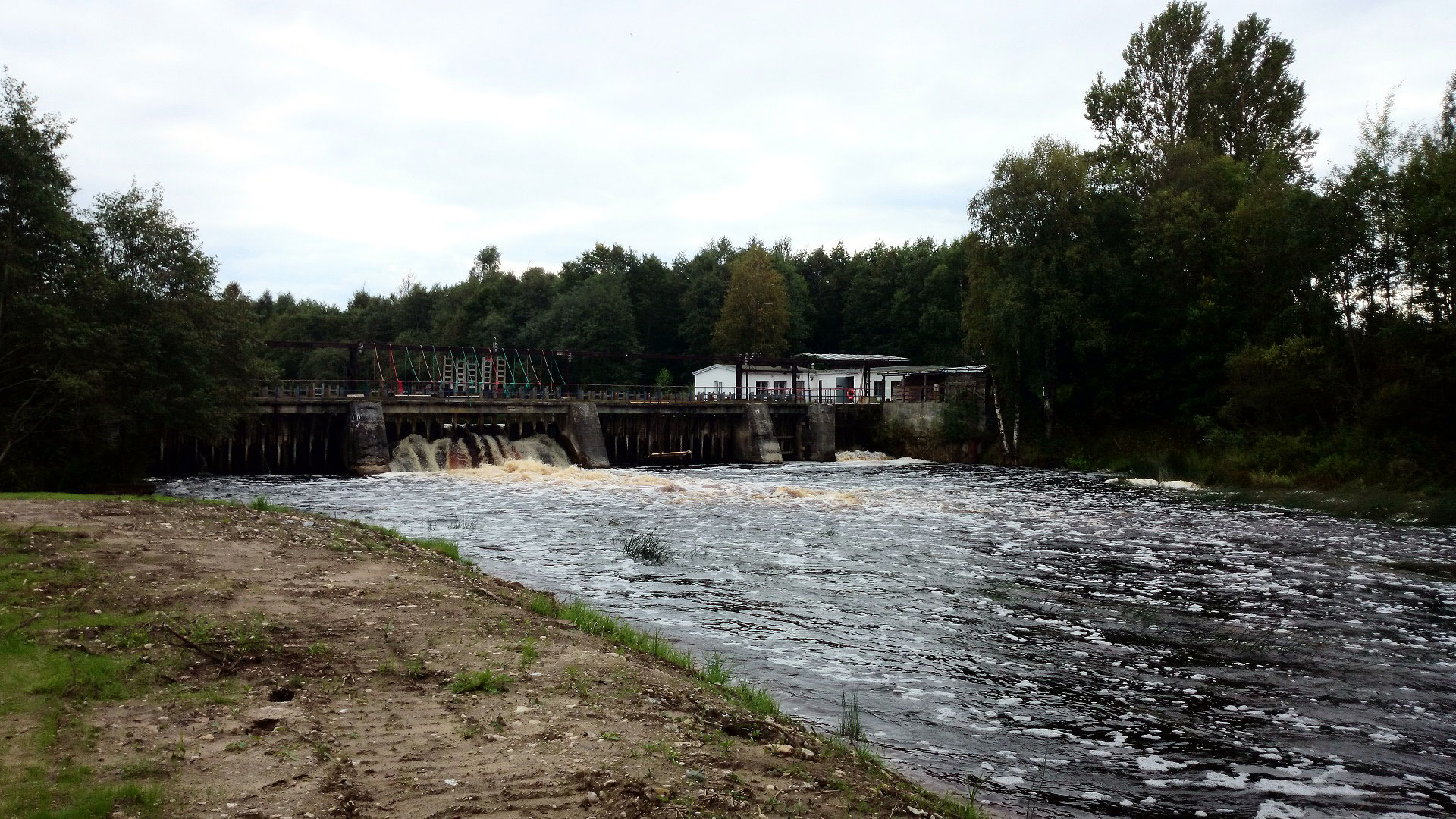
Pulp mill dam downstream

=== Politics ===
After village councils (Estonian: külanõukogud) were abolished in the newly independent Estonia, Kehra was re-established as a borough on October 24, 1991. Jüri Lillsoo was the head of the borough (Estonian: alevivanem) between 1991 and 1993. When Kehra became a town in 1993, he continued on as a mayor and retained that position until Kehra became a part of Anija parish in 2002.

Estonian Prime Minister Jüri Ratas has said that "Anija parish is a good example of strong cooperation between local governments", and that "As a living environment, Anija parish is excellent".

The flag of Kehra between October 8, 1993, and December 2, 2002

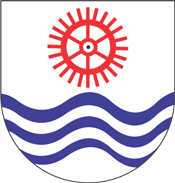
The coat of arms of Kehra between October 8, 1993, and December 2, 2002

== Geography ==
=== Neighborhoods ===
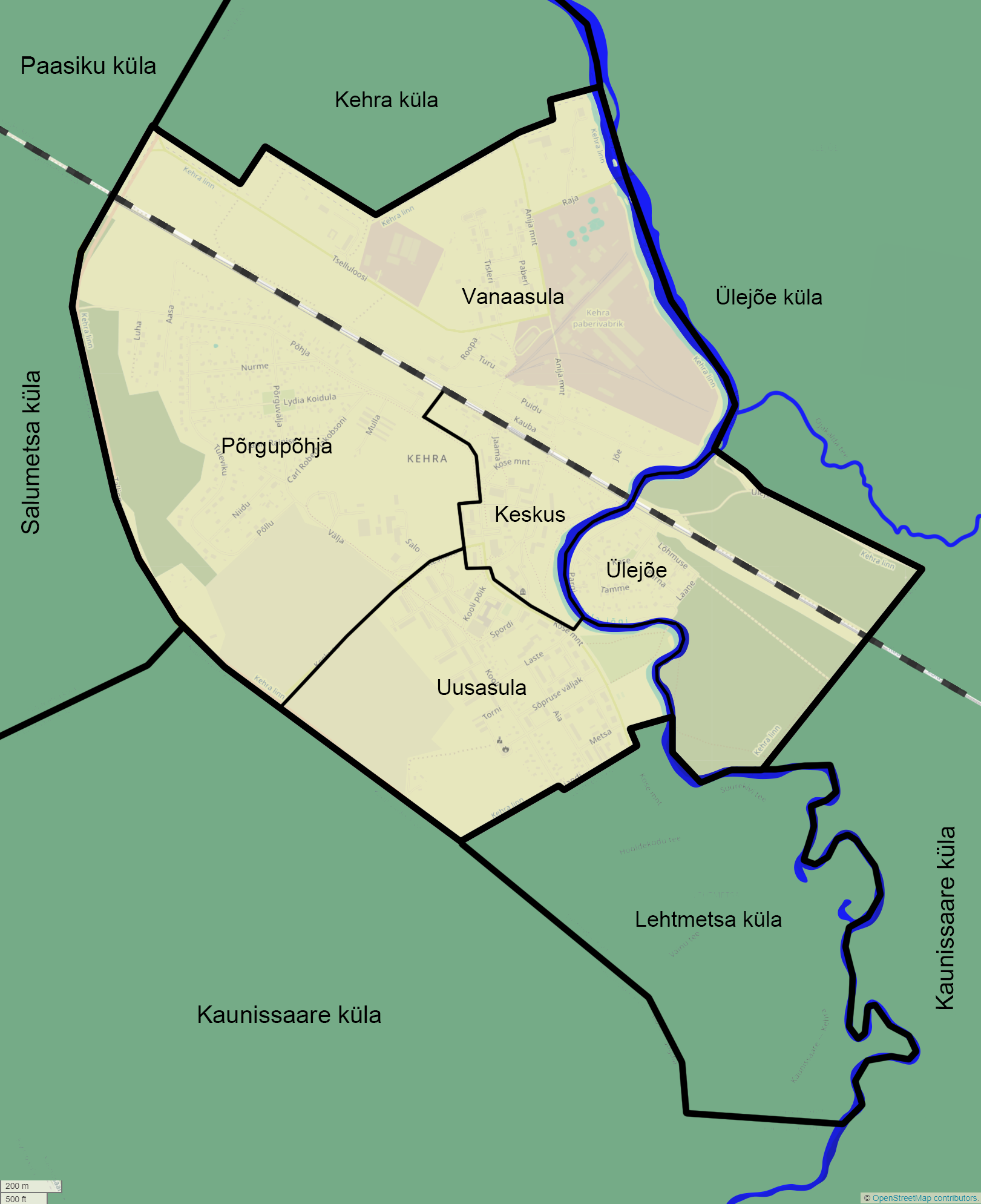
Kehra neighborhoods

There are five neighborhoods in Kehra: Keskus, Vana-asula, Uusasula, Ülejõe, and Põrgupõhja.

The oldest parts of the town are Keskus and Vanaasula, which were already inhabited before the manor was built between 1624 and 1637. The railway was built in 1870 and it split off the current Vanaasula from the rest of the manor. The manor started expanding westwards around the same time. Construction of the pulp mill began in 1936 and brought along large scale development of Kehra. Most of the buildings in Uusasula were built between 1953 and 1991. Construction in the Põrgupõhja district began in 1956. Ülejõe district was supposed to become a summer resort area and the houses were built between 1932 and 1969.

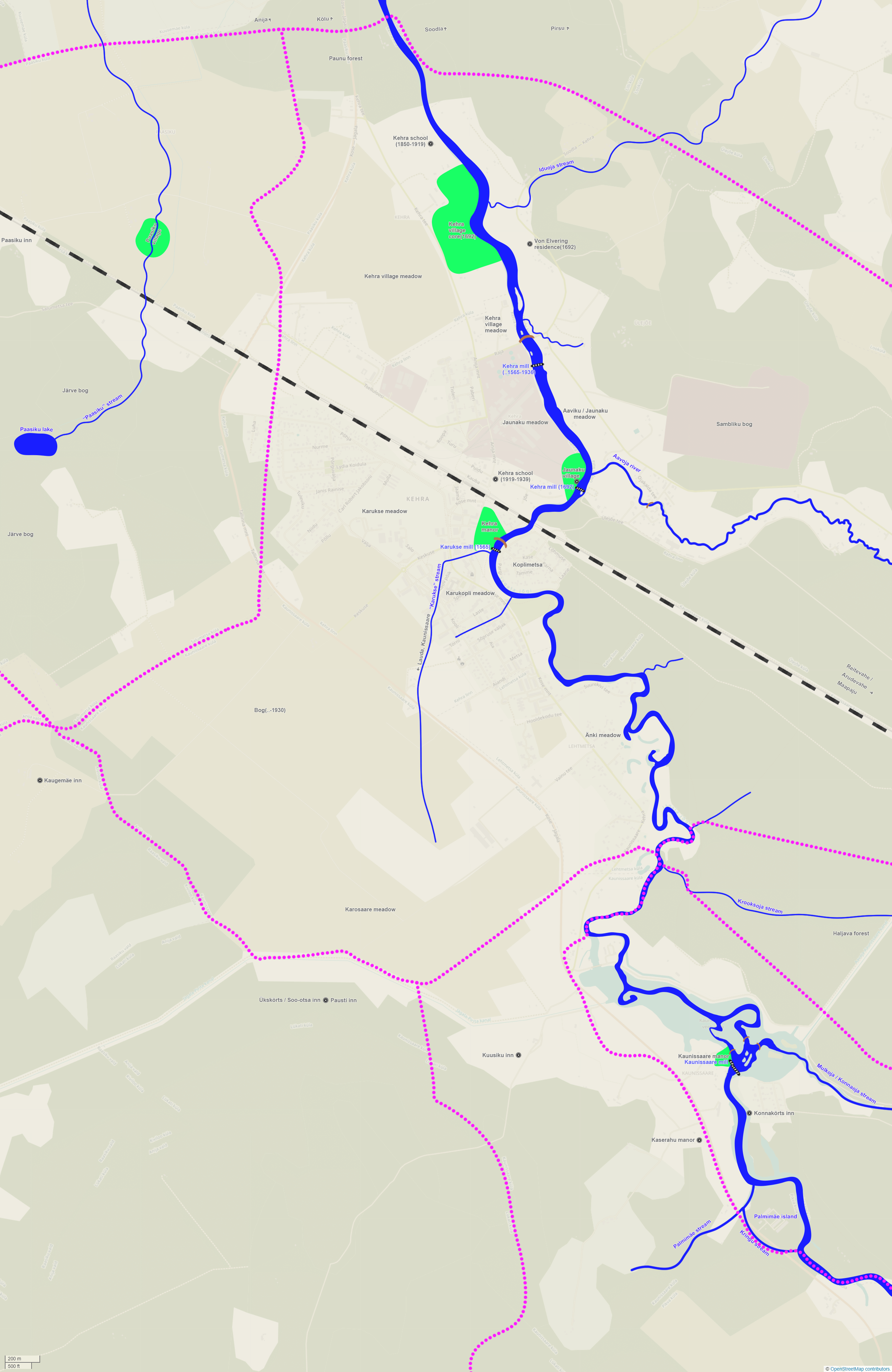
Kehra map with historic locations

==== Keskus (Kehramõisa) ====
According to the Swedish land audit of 1564–1565, Karukse mill was located just south-east of the place where the manor currently is, near the mouth of the alleged Karukse stream. The manor itself was first built sometime between 1624 and 1637. Karukse meadow lied to the west of the manor complex, other nearby lands were covered by forests. The railway station building was built between 1876 and 1878. The manor complex did not expand west of the current Kreutzwaldi street until the end of the 19th century. Kehra park lies to the south of the manor.

The current elementary school was built in 1939. The current local government building was built in 1975 to accommodate students. The pharmacy and the medical center were built in 1989. The local EEKB congregation building was built in 1990 as a canteen-office for the local sovkhoz. The congregation acquired the building in 1995.

The district is bordered by the Kose road to the west and south, Jägala River to the east, and Tallinn-Narva railway to the north.

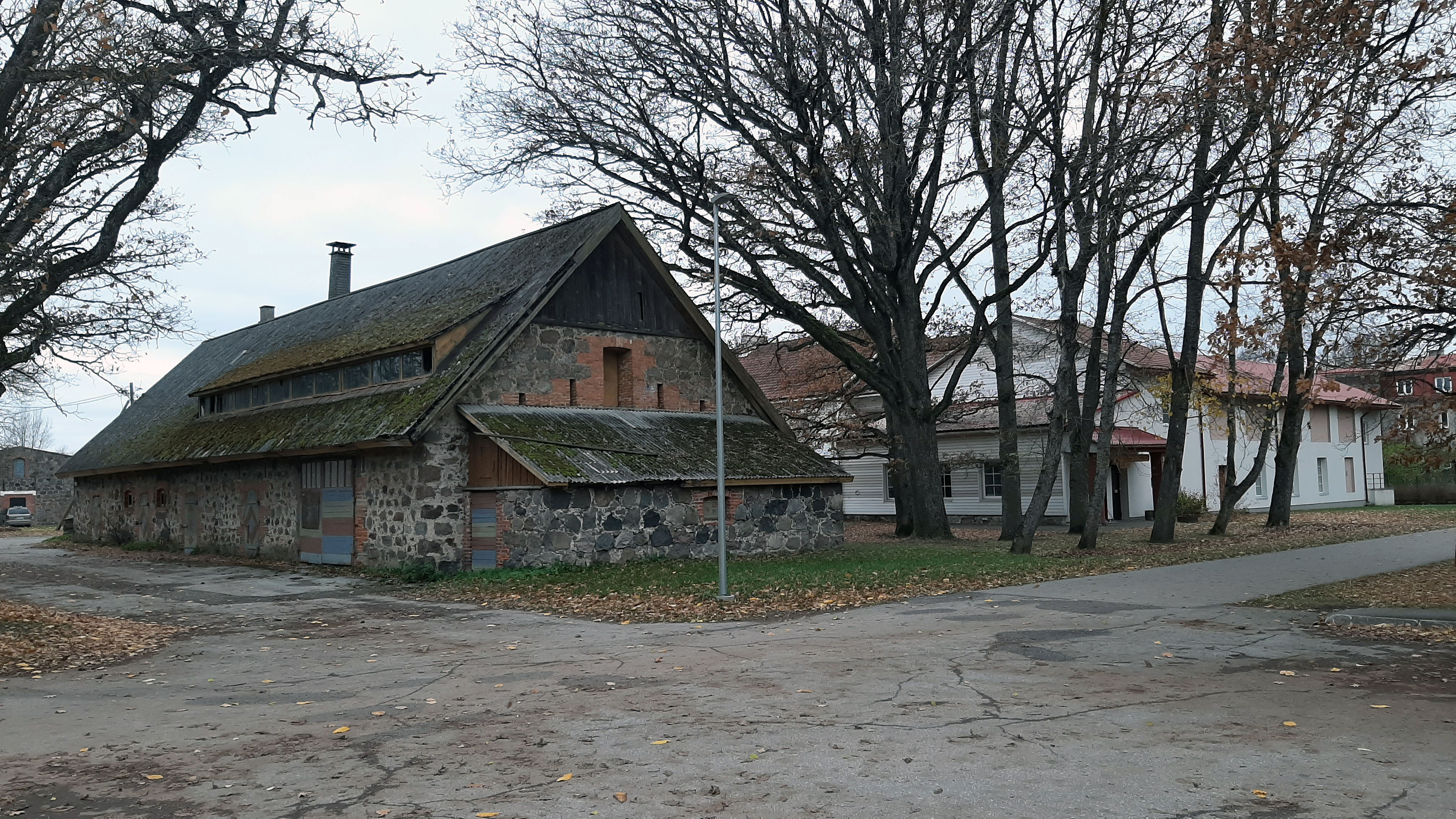
Kehra granary and cultural center

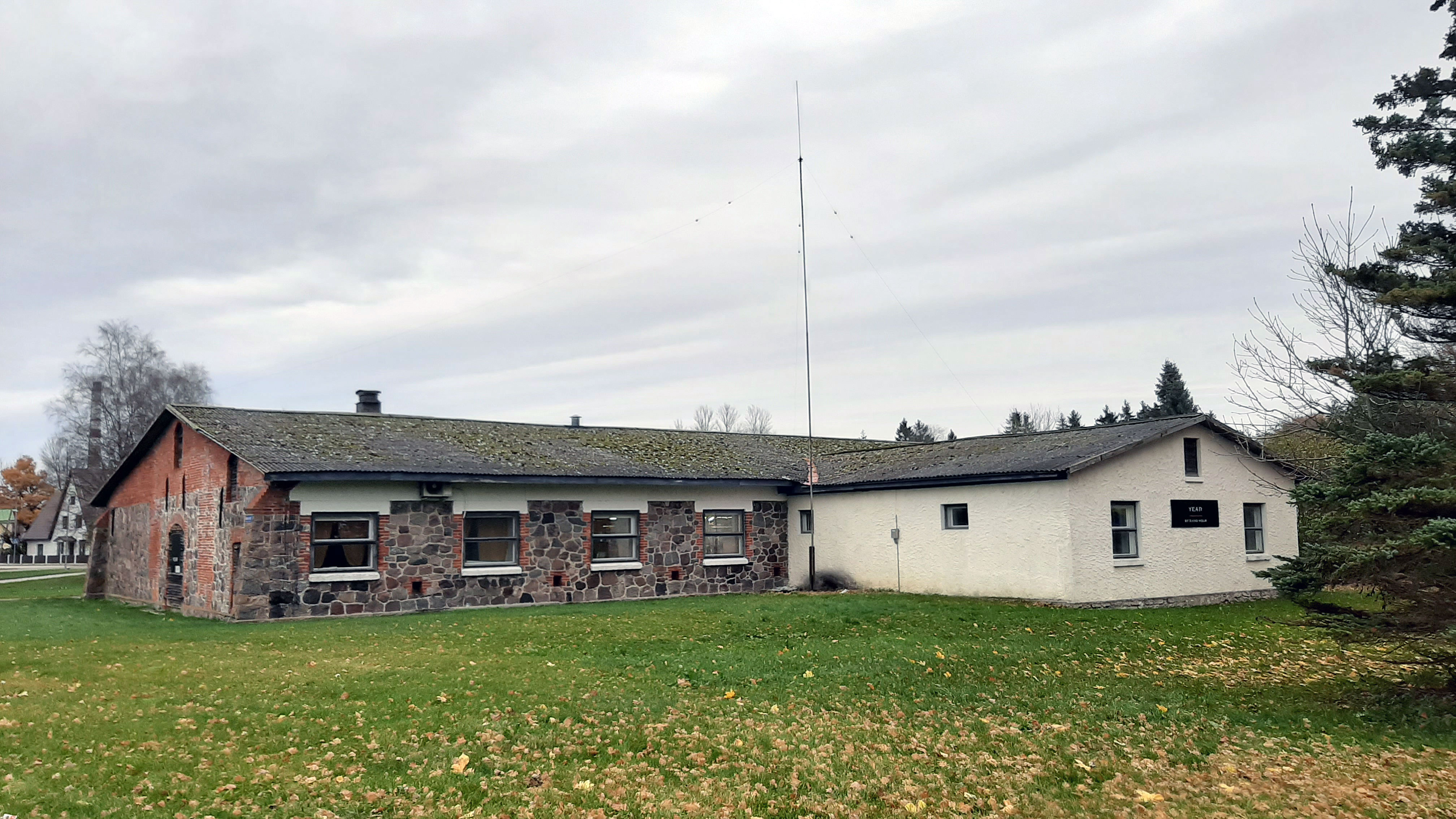
Kehra stables, nowadays a sewing factory

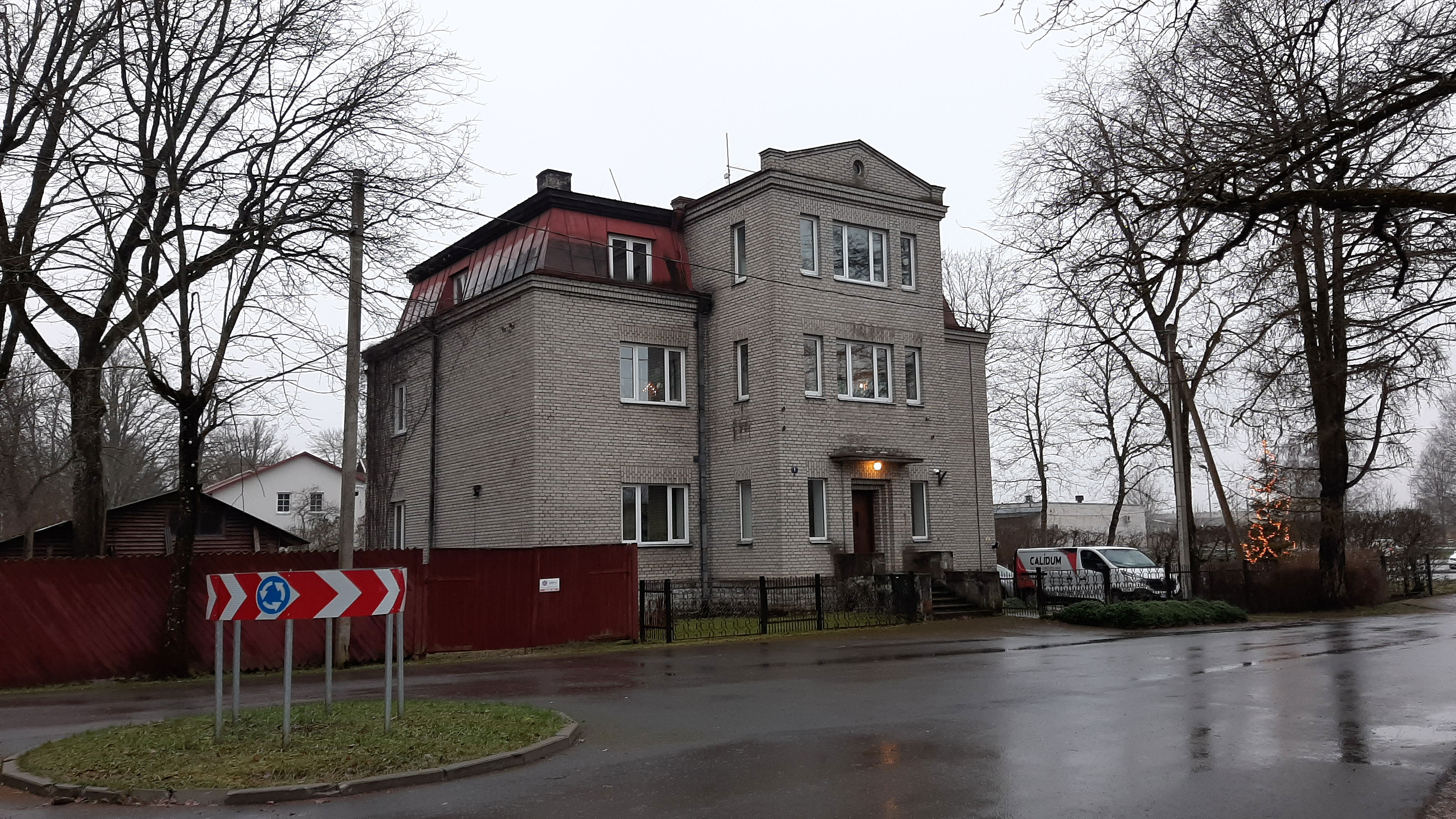
Kose maantee 1

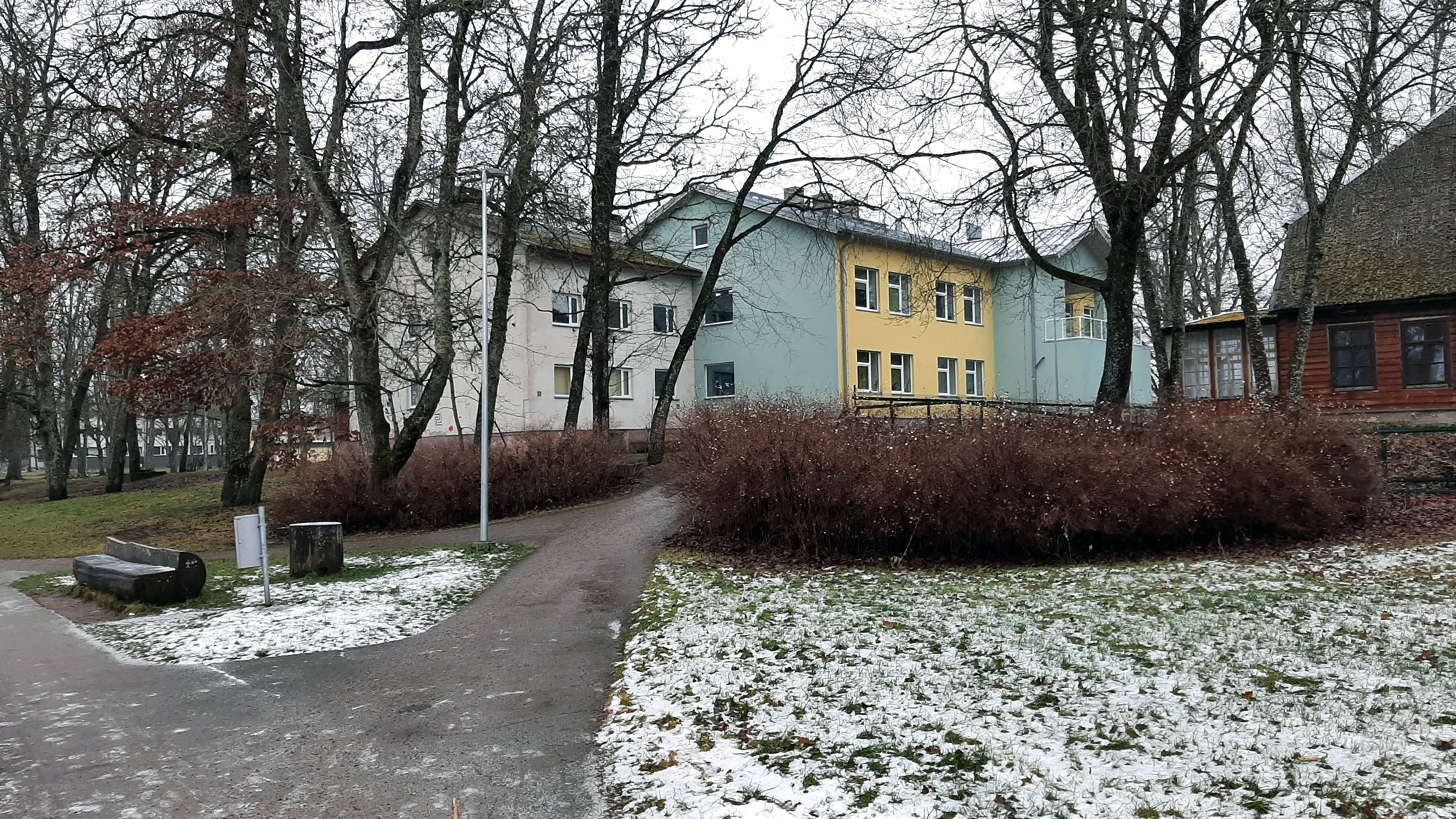
Local medical center

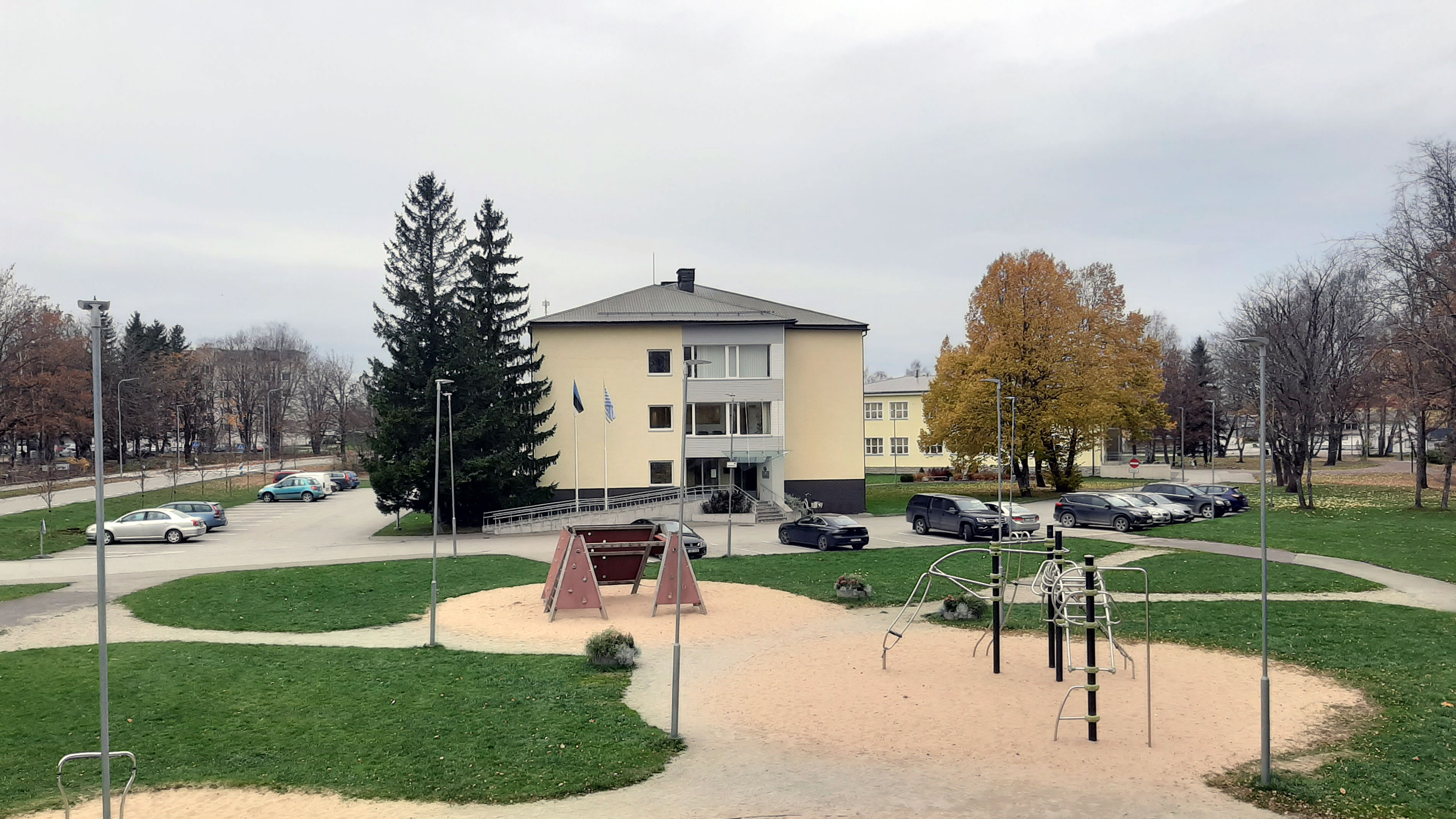
Local municipal government building

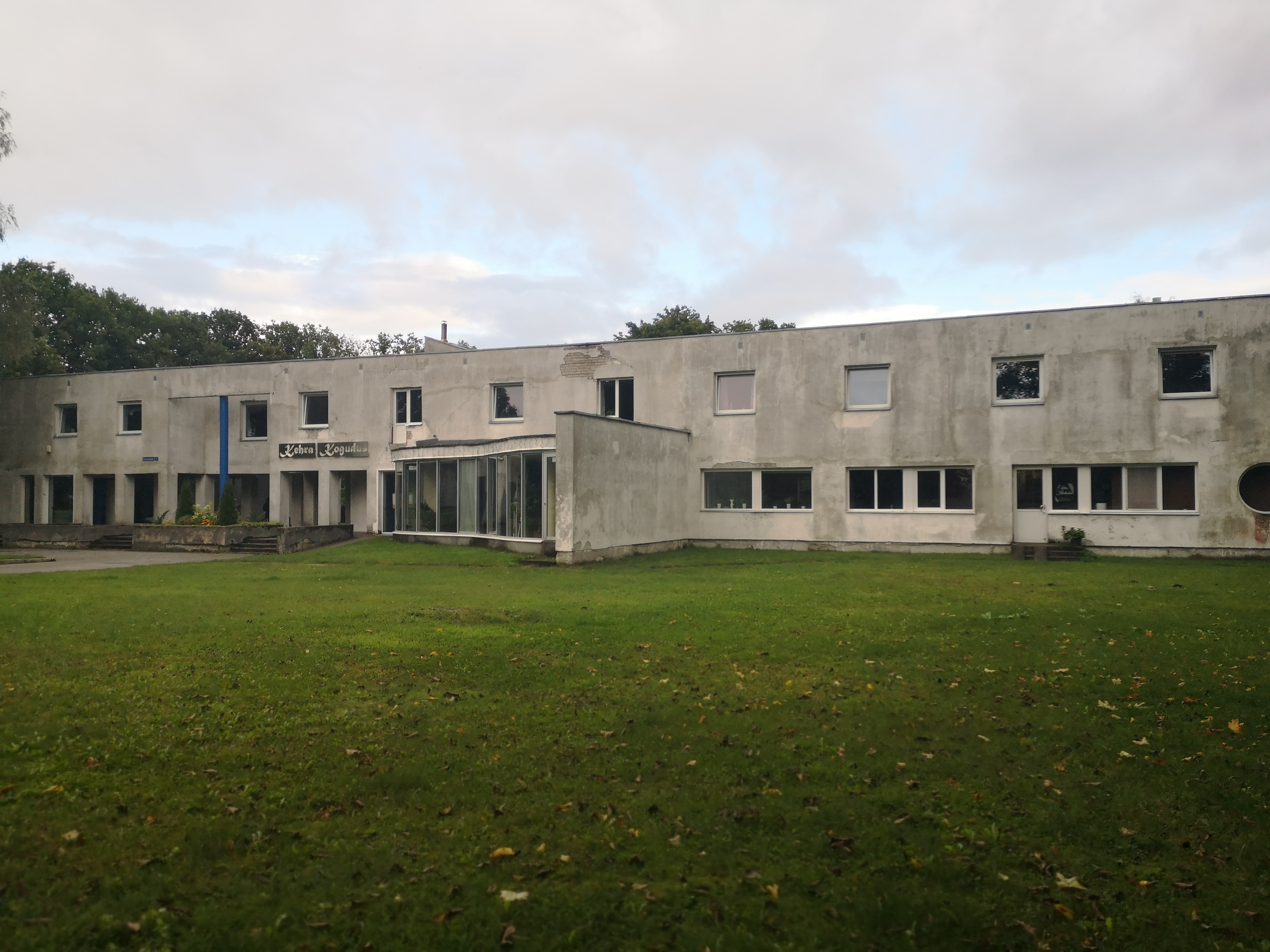
EEKB congregation building

==== Vana-asula ====
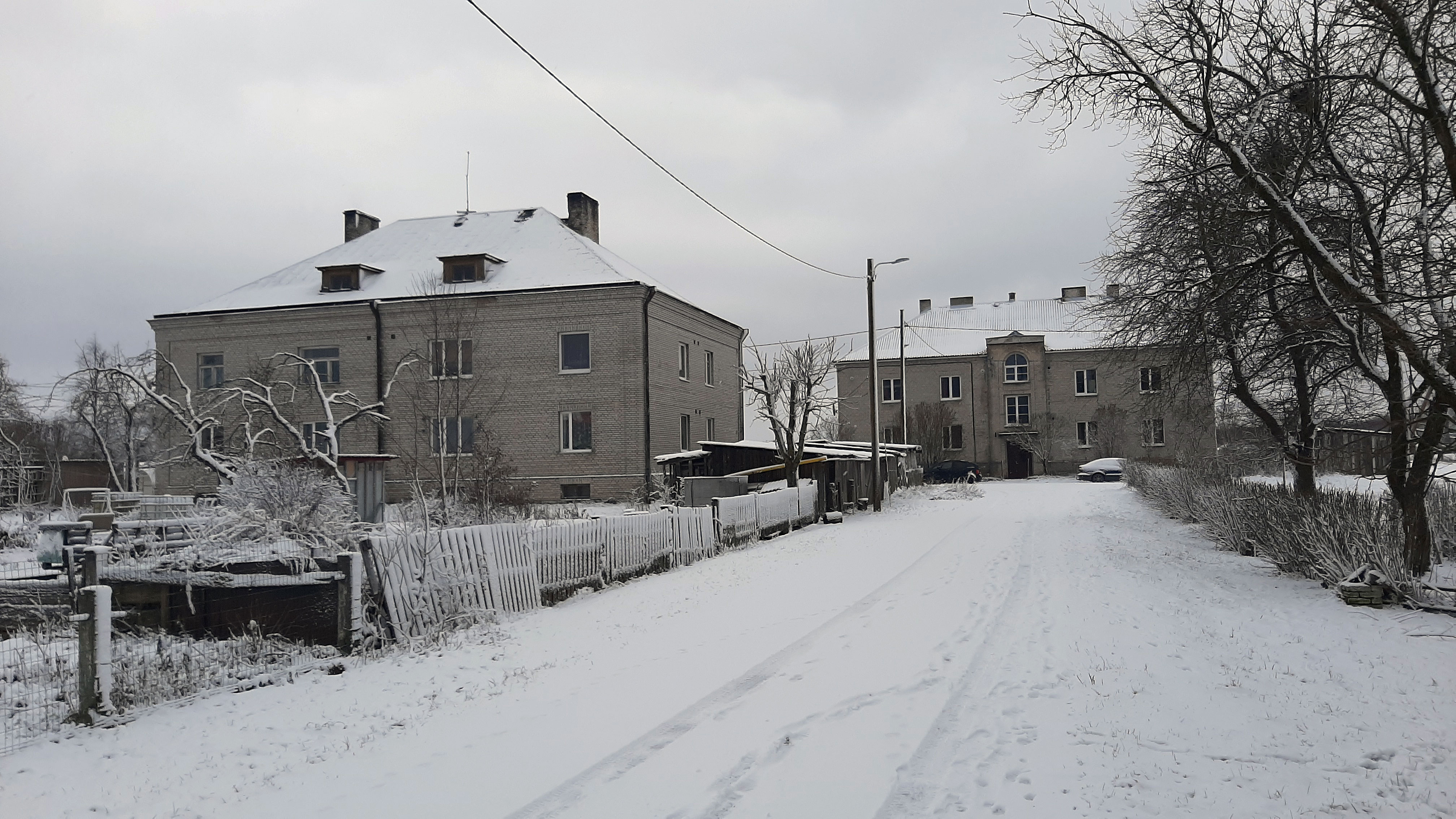
Buildings in Vanaasula

The village of Jaunack, which was located near the mouth of the Aavoja river, and Kehra mill, which was located near the current car bridge, were first mentioned in the Swedish land audit of 1564–1565. Other nearby land was mostly covered by fields and forests.

On a 1856 map, a storehouse was located just south of the current Raja street and an inn was located just north of the street. A Baptist place of worship was built on top of the remains of the inn at the beginning of the 20th century. The oldest houses south of the pulp mill were also built in the beginning of the 20th century, according to maps and the building register. Between 1919 and 1939, Kehra school operated in a now destroyed building on the Anija road. The construction of the pulp mill and the nearby apartment buildings was conducted between 1937 and 1938.

The district is bordered by the village of Kehra and its fields to the north, the Jägala River to the east, the Tallinn–Narva railway to the south, and the highway from Kose to Jägala to the west.

==== Uusasula ====
Historically, the district's land was covered by Karukopli and Karukse meadows, which were separated by the alleged Karukse stream. Most of the apartment buildings in the district were built between 1953 and 1991, according to the building register. The Stalinist buildings next to the Kose road were built between 1953 and 1958, including the pulp mill club. The apartment buildings on Aia street and Kooli 12 were built between 1962 and 1966. The apartment buildings on Kooli and Keskuse streets were built between 1968 and 1991. The residential buildings on Kooli street were mostly built in the 1950s and 1960s. The apartment buildings in the nearby Lehtmetsa village were built between 1972 and 1988. The current Kehra Gymnasium building was built in 1961. Kehra sports complex was opened in 2003. The pulp mill club was demolished in 2013.

The district is bordered by Keskuse street and Kose road to the north, Jägala river to the east, Lehtmetsa village to the south of Aiandi street, and Kose-Jägala highway to the west.

New buildings are planned on Aia street and a new residential area is planned south of the local rescue squad building, between Kooli street and the highway.

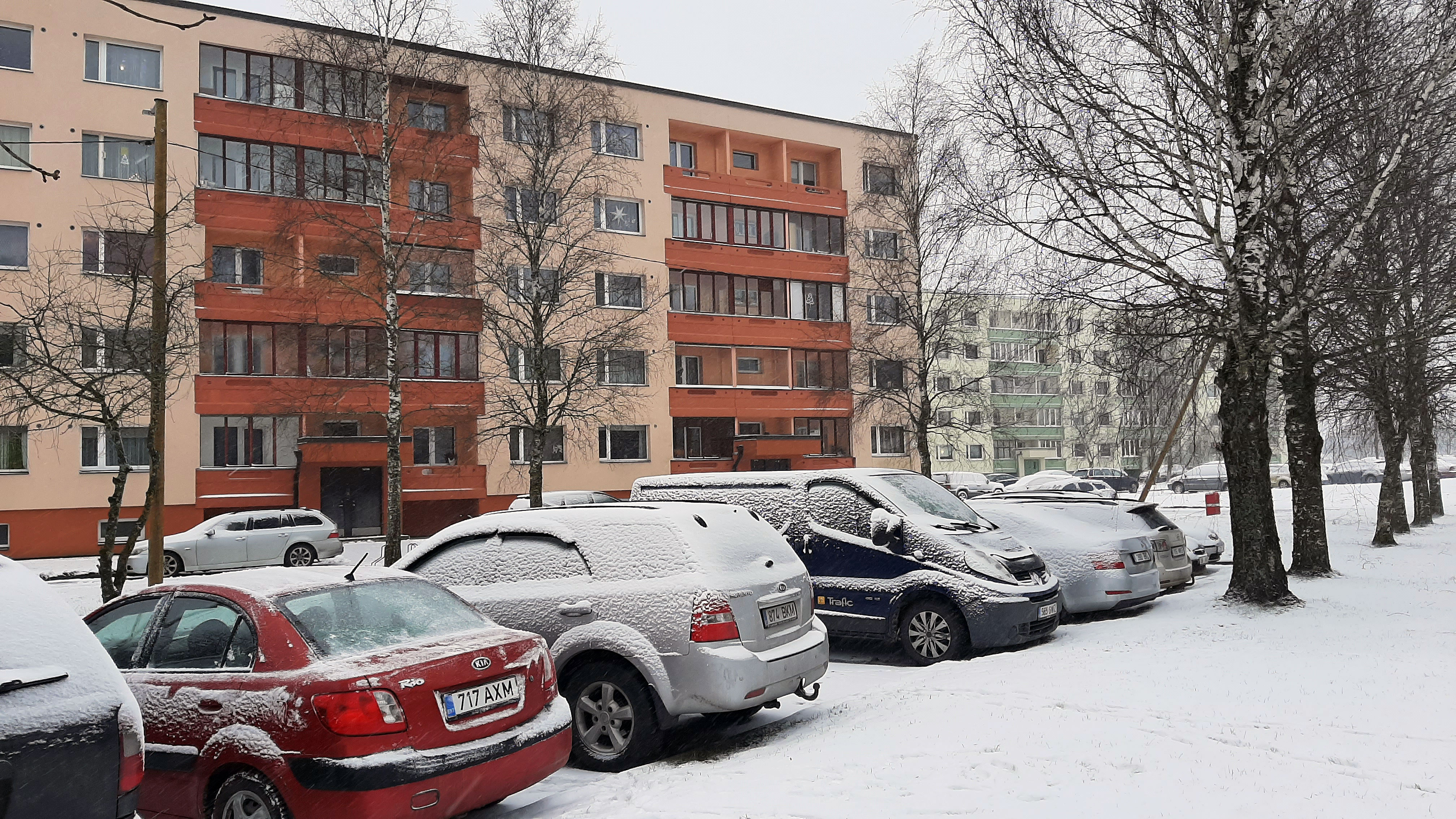
Plattenbaus on Kooli street

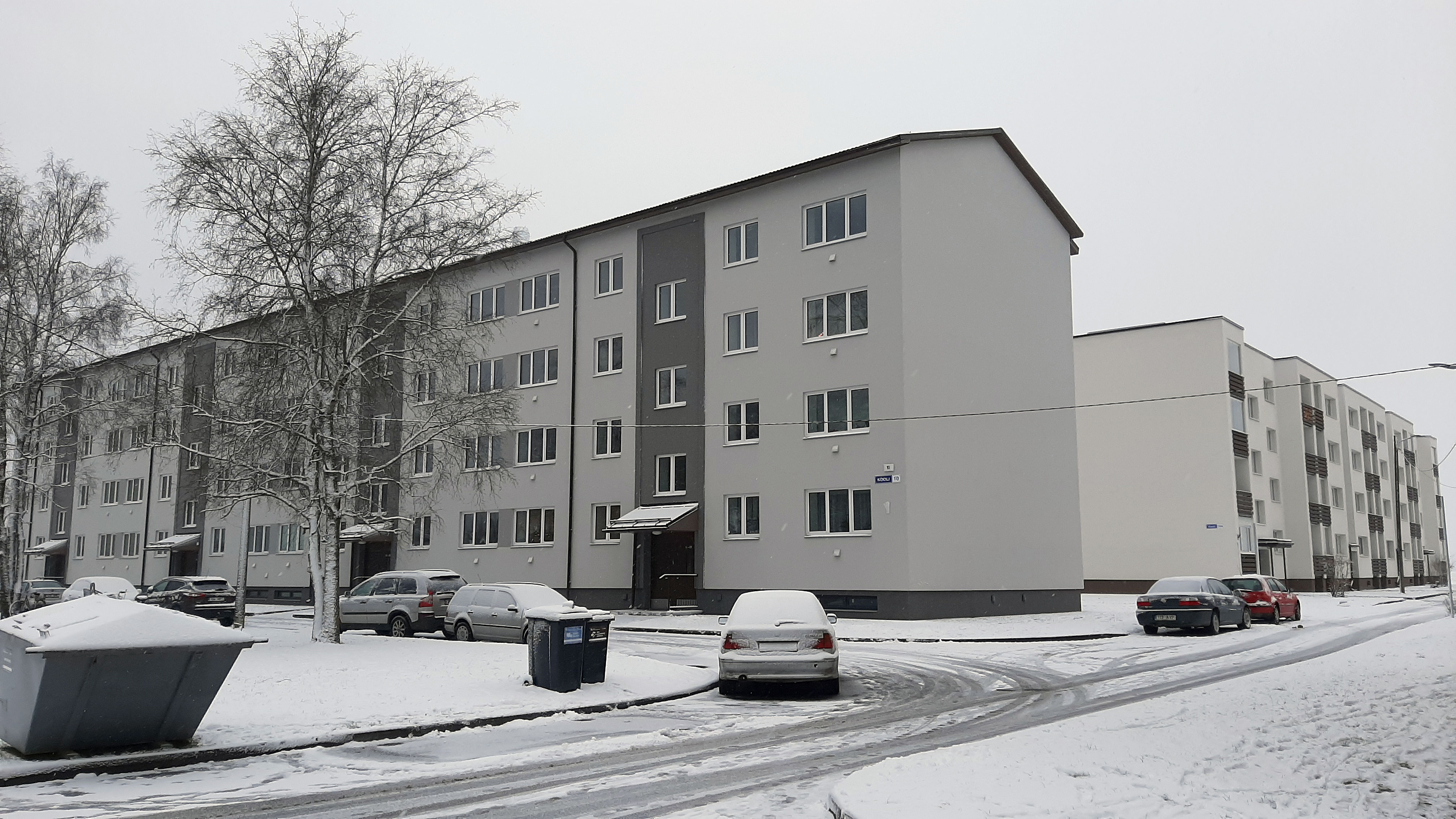
Khrushchyovkas on Kooli street

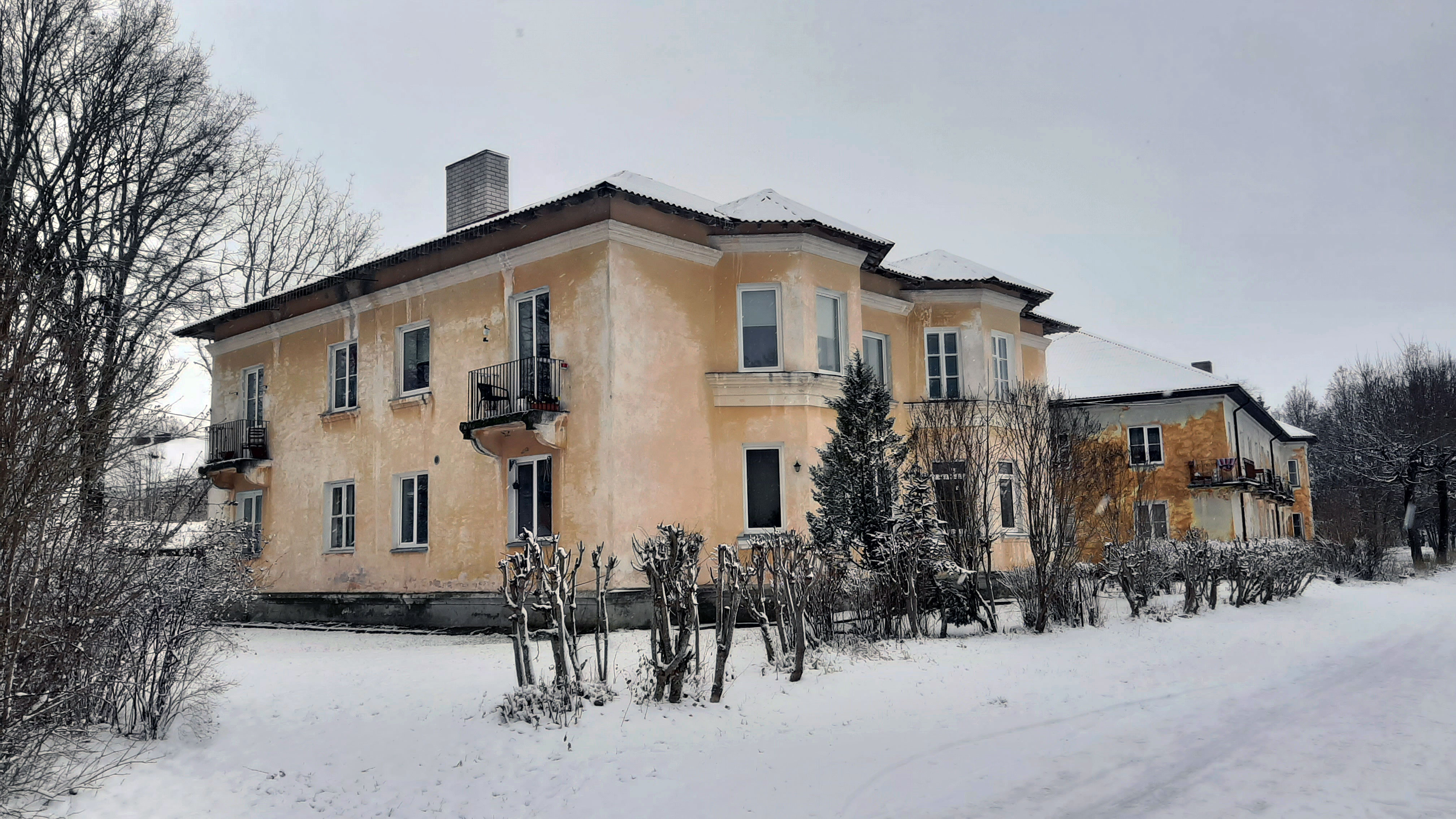
Stalinist houses on Kose maantee

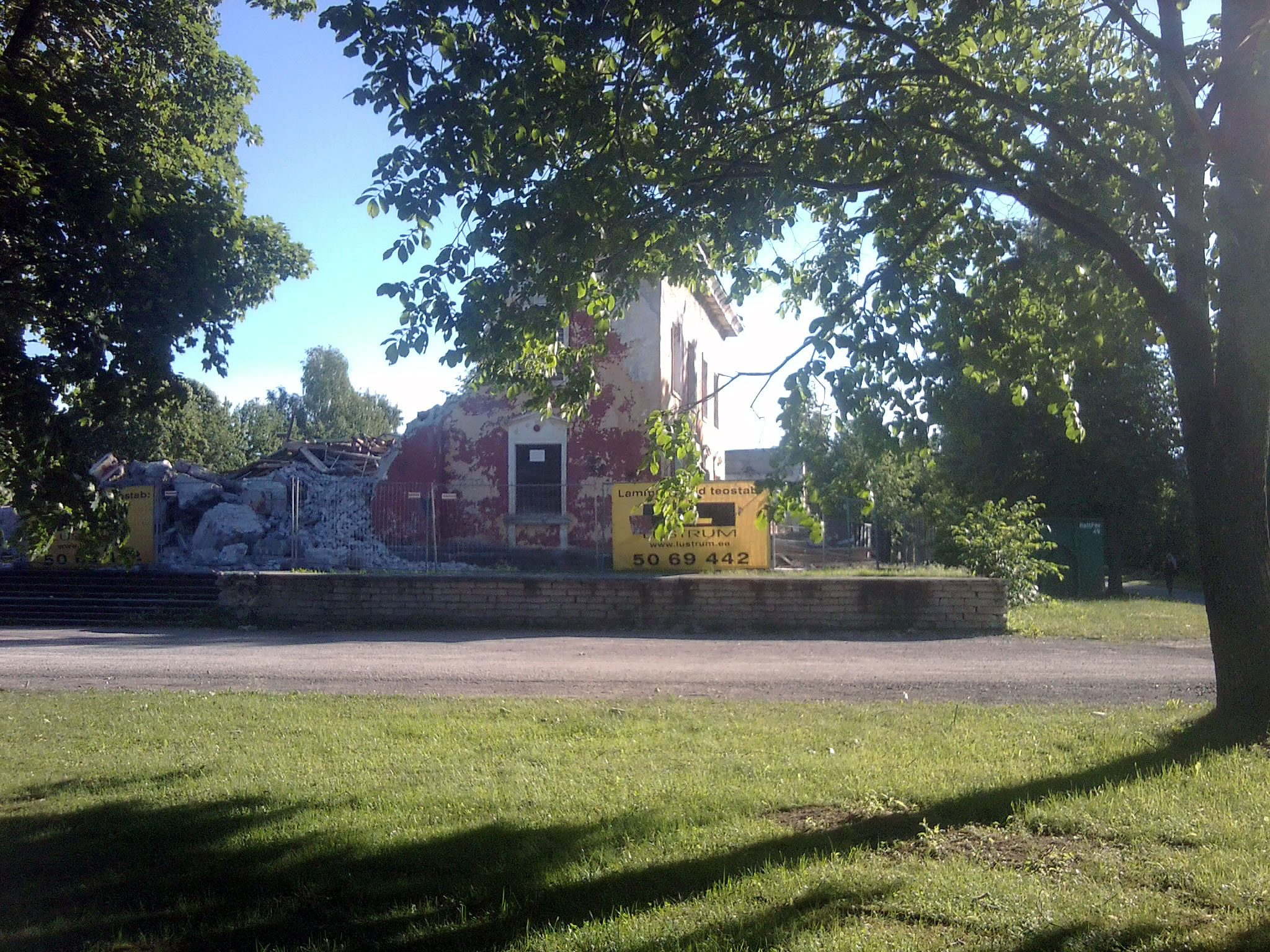
Kehra pulp mill club being demolished

==== Ülejõe ====
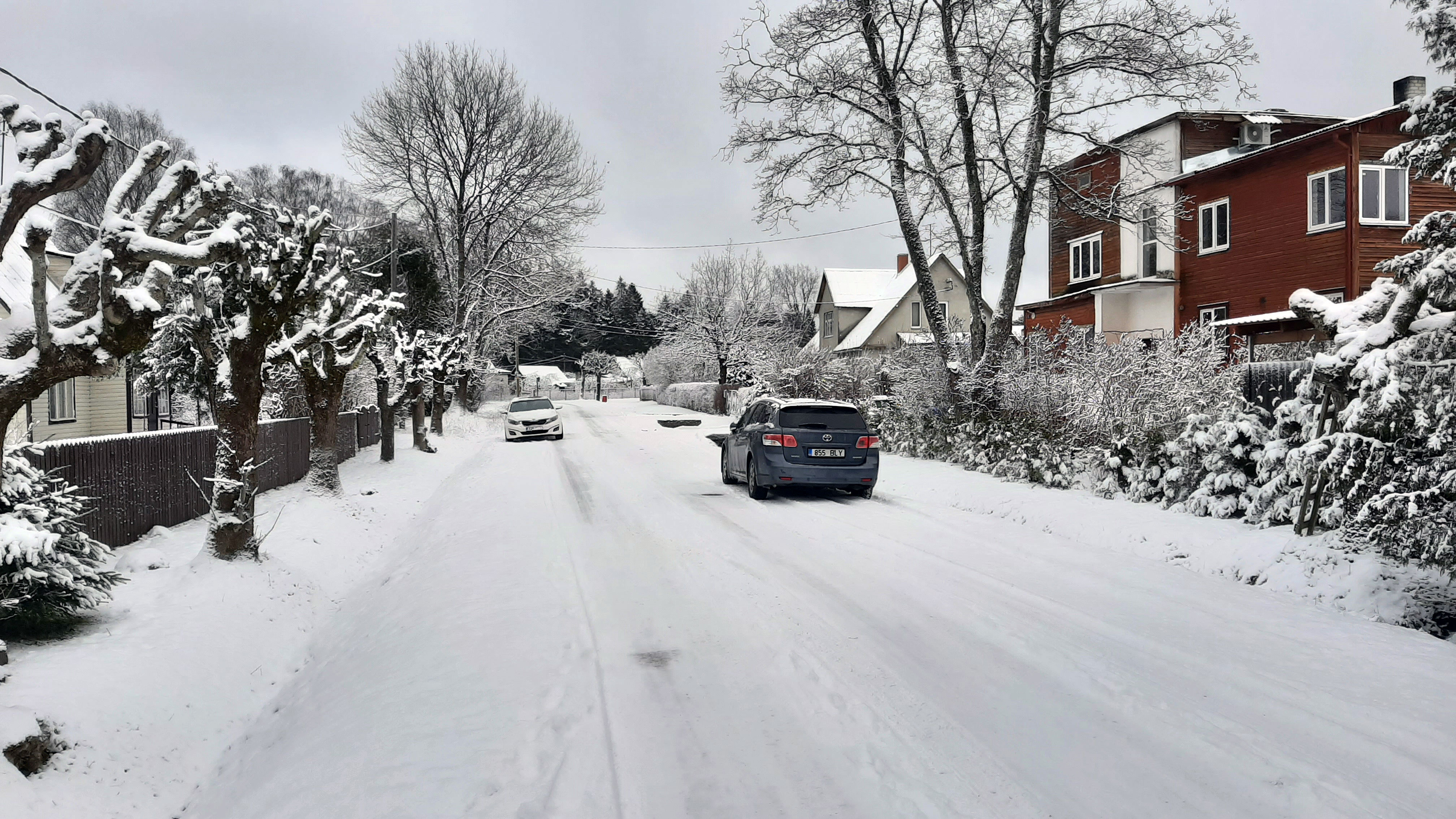
Kase street

In the early 1930s, there were plans to build a summer resort area on the opposite side of the river from Kehra Manor in an area then known as Kopli mets. The first houses were built in 1932 and the last one was built in 1969. The apartment buildings were built before the second world war. According to the district's plan from 1935, 28 plots of land were allocated for building, but those were split into smaller plots during the Soviet occupation. According to the same plan, there should have been more houses between Lõhmuse street and the river, sporting facilities and shops near the current stadium, and a bridge over the river between Kalda and Kase streets.

There are two suspension bridges that connect the district to other parts of Kehra. The northern bridge is next to the railway bridge and is more used, while the southern bridge connects the district to the local stadium. Ülejõe village is located 300 meters north from the railway crossing. The district is bordered by the Jägala River to the west and south, Tallinn-Narva railway to the north, and forest to the east.

A car bridge over the river is planned to be built between 2024 and 2026.

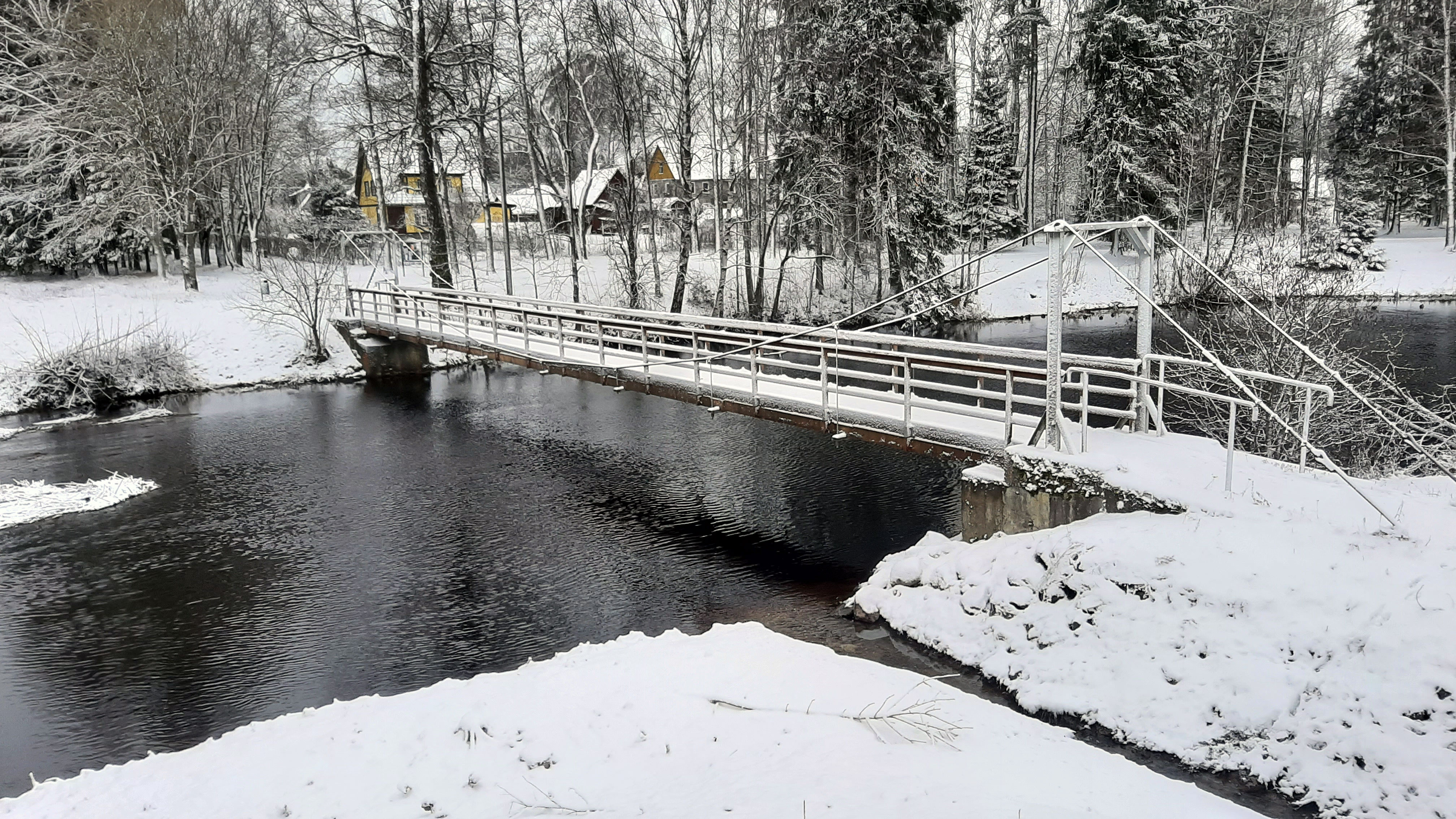
Bridge near the railway

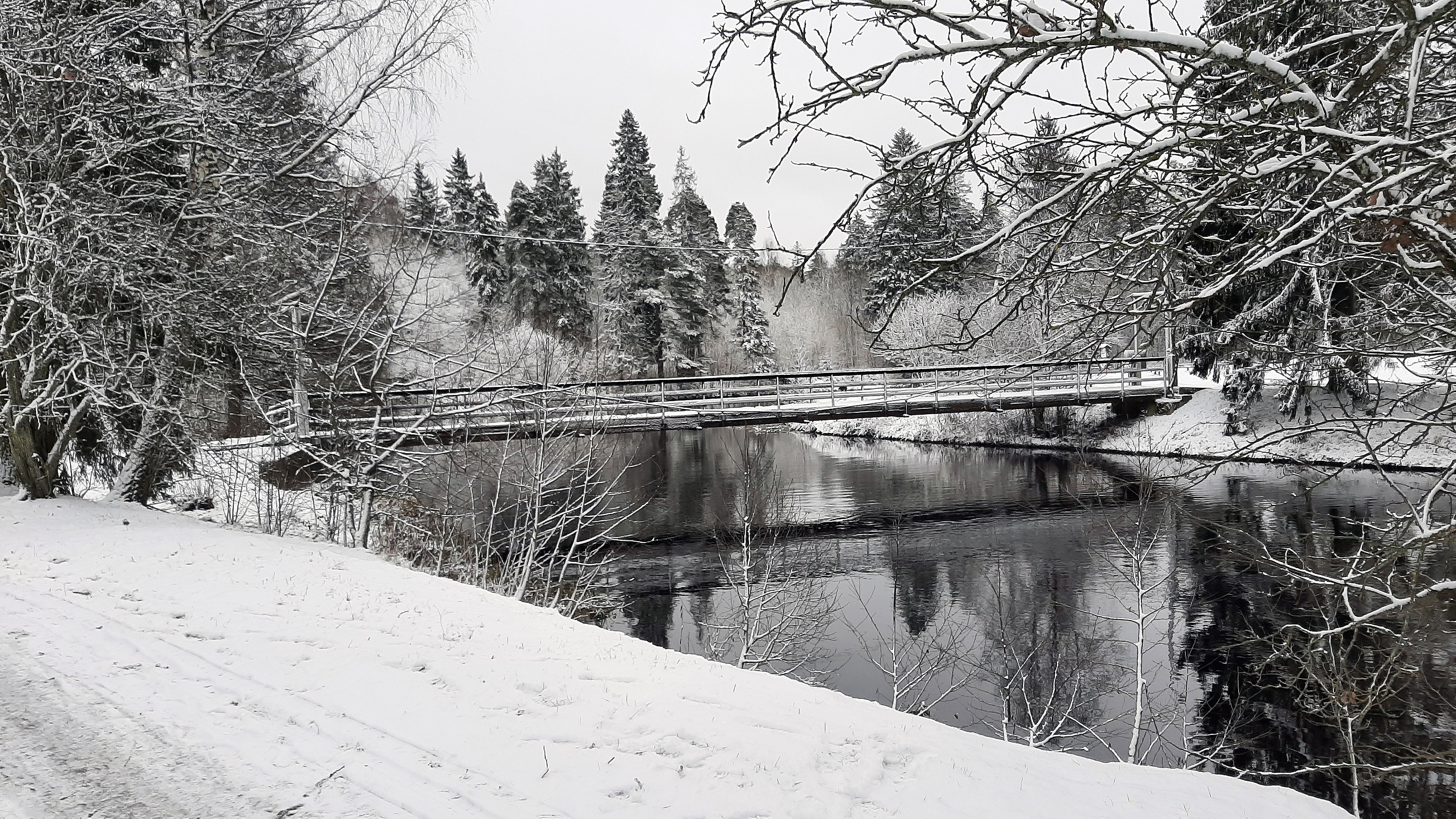
Stadium bridge

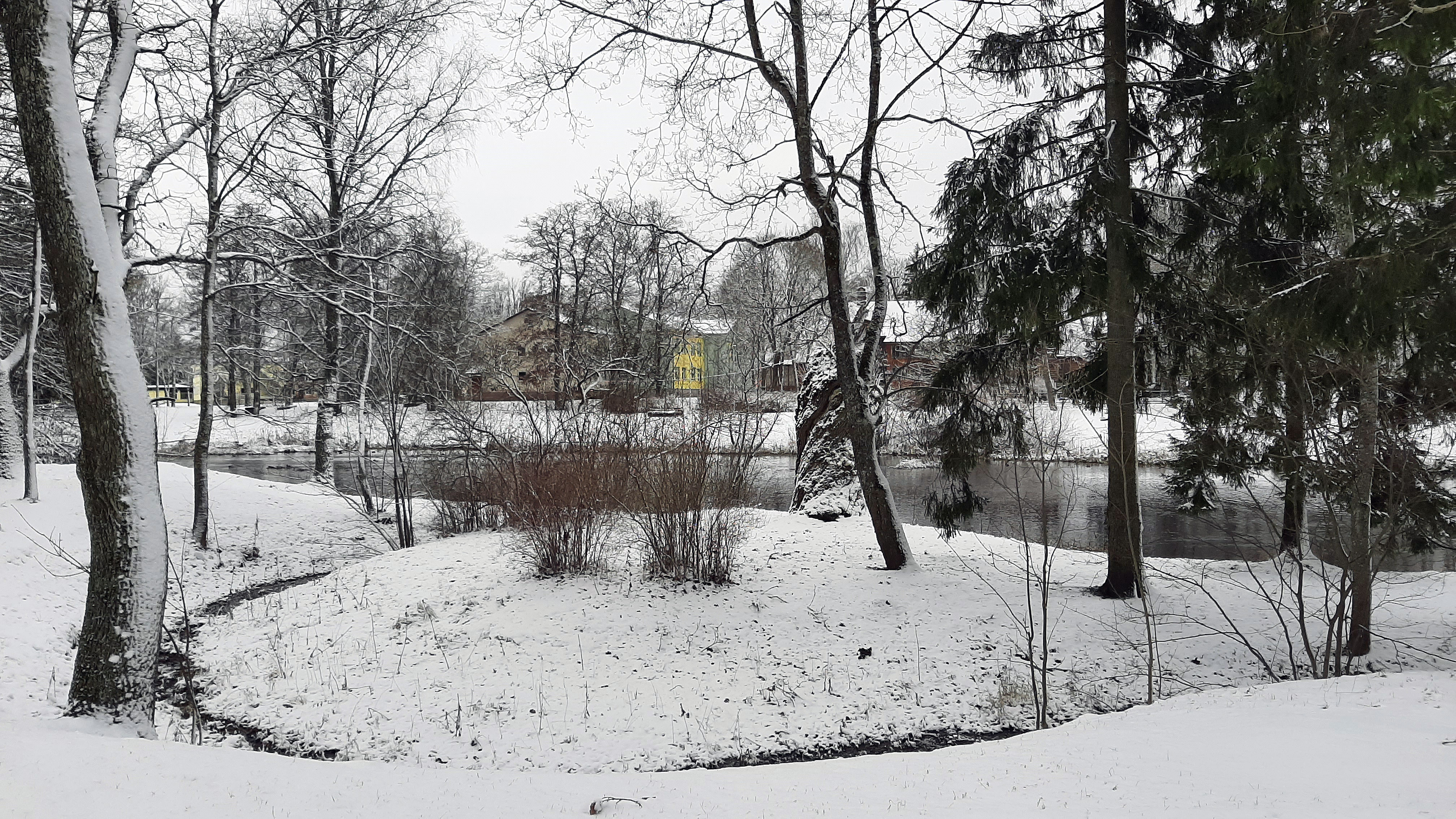
Artificial island

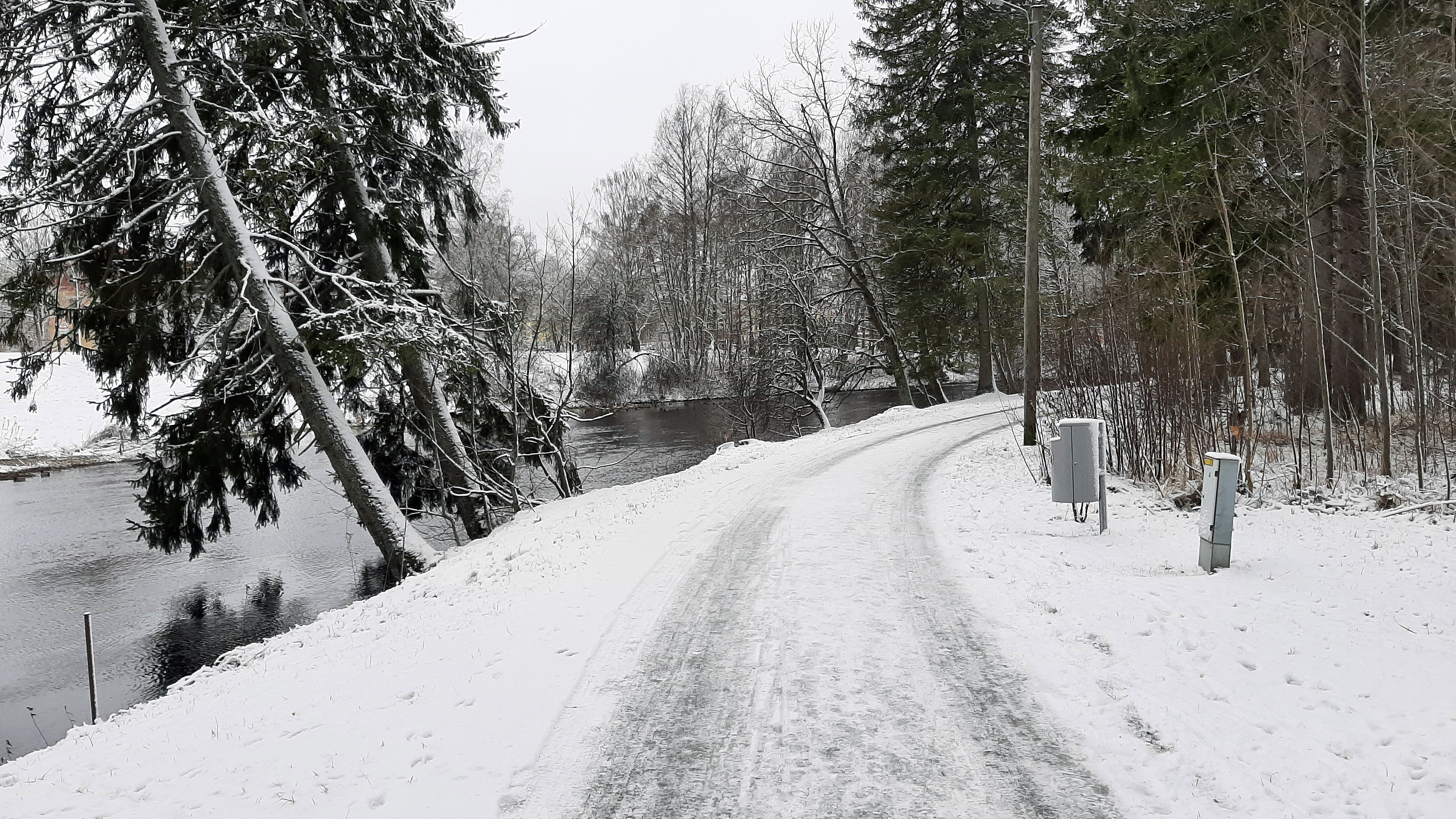
Riverside road

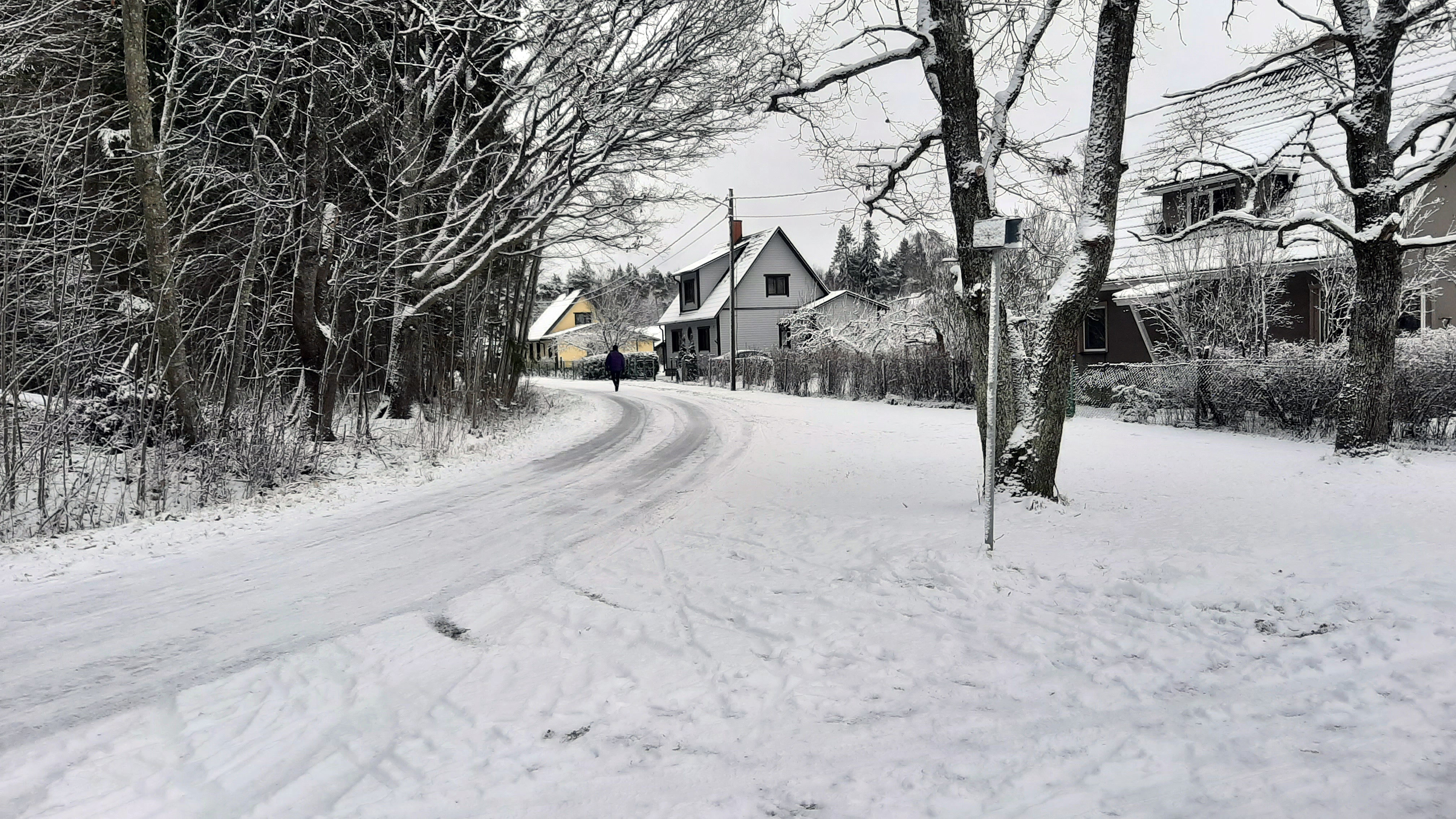
Lõhmuse street

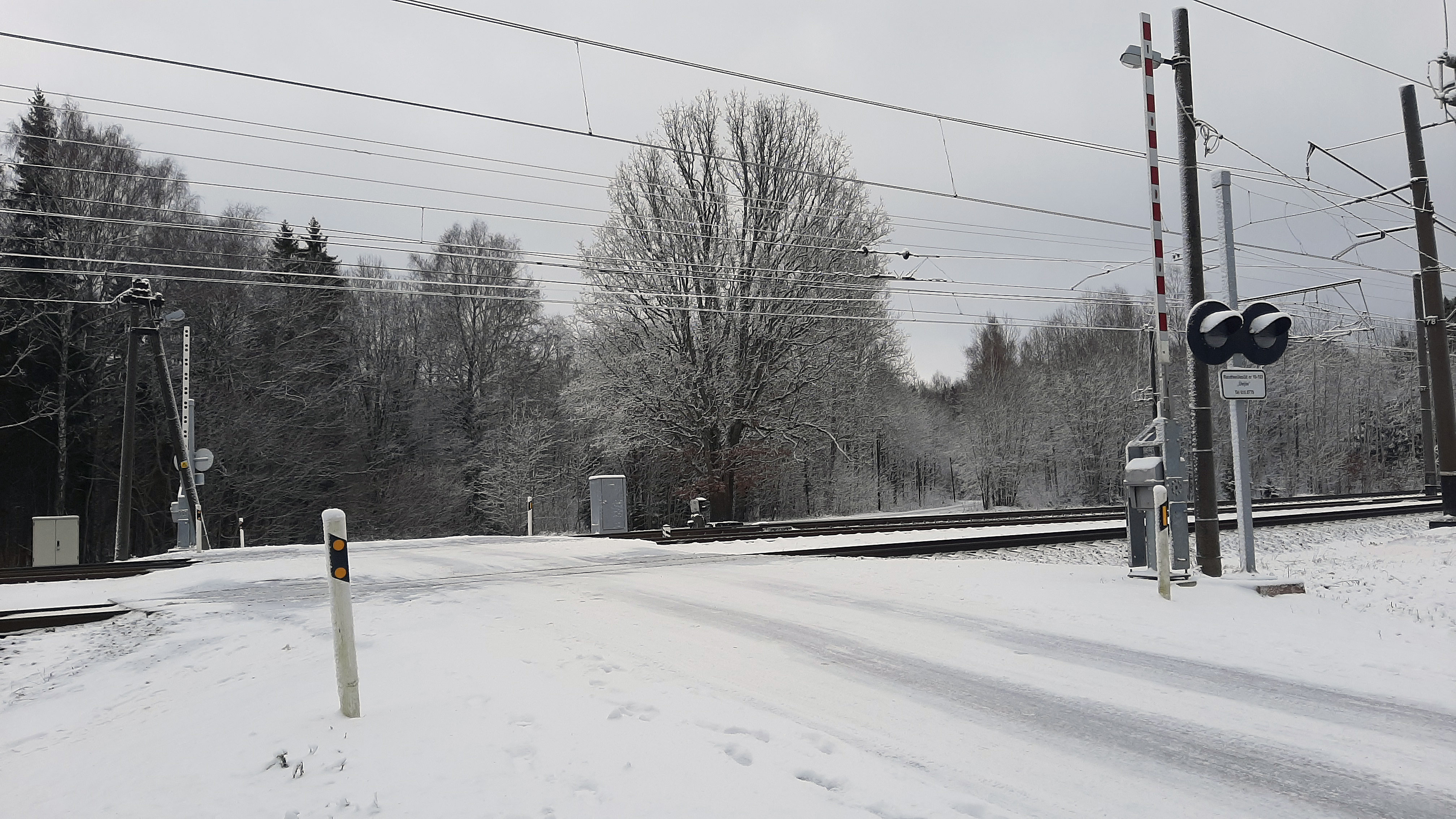
Road to Ülejõe village

==== Põrgupõhja ====
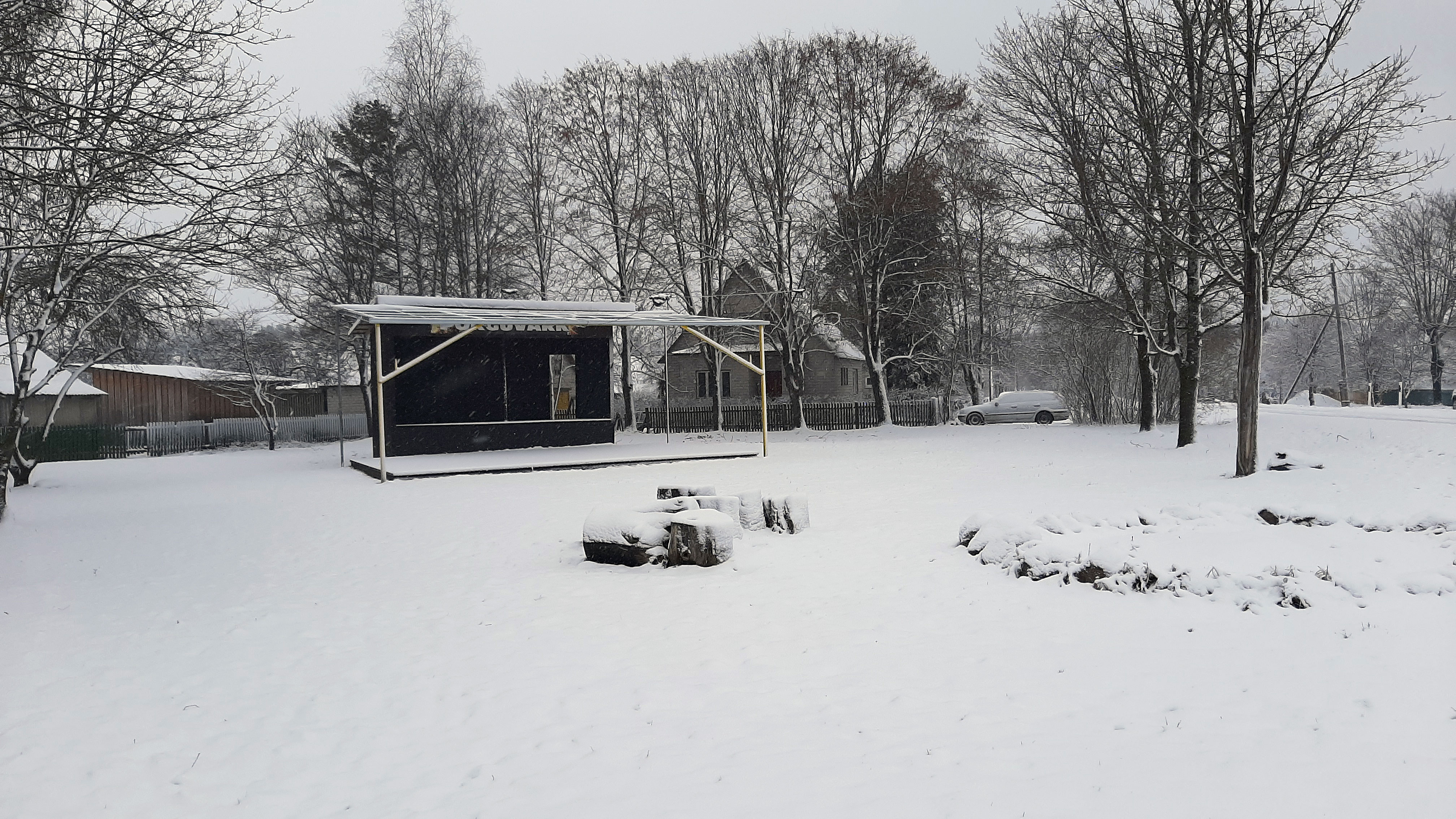
Põrgulava in winter

The first property on the land of the district existed by 1870 and was known as Selja renditalu. Before the large scale development of the district began in 1956, only two more properties were built - Nurme and Lehtmetsa. The land was mostly covered with sparse spruce forest.

The name of the district was coined by one of the first new settlers - Karl Rass. He complained that the land was really hard to develop, since it was really rocky and hard, and called it the bottom of the hell (Estonian: põrgu põhi). The name stuck and became the district's official name.

The district lies one kilometer west of the main town, fields lay in between. Before The Second World War, the border between Kehra and Paasiku ran where Aasa street is located, but nowadays, the town's land extends until Kose-Jägala highway. The district is bordered by the Tallinn-Narva railway from the north.

=== Nature ===
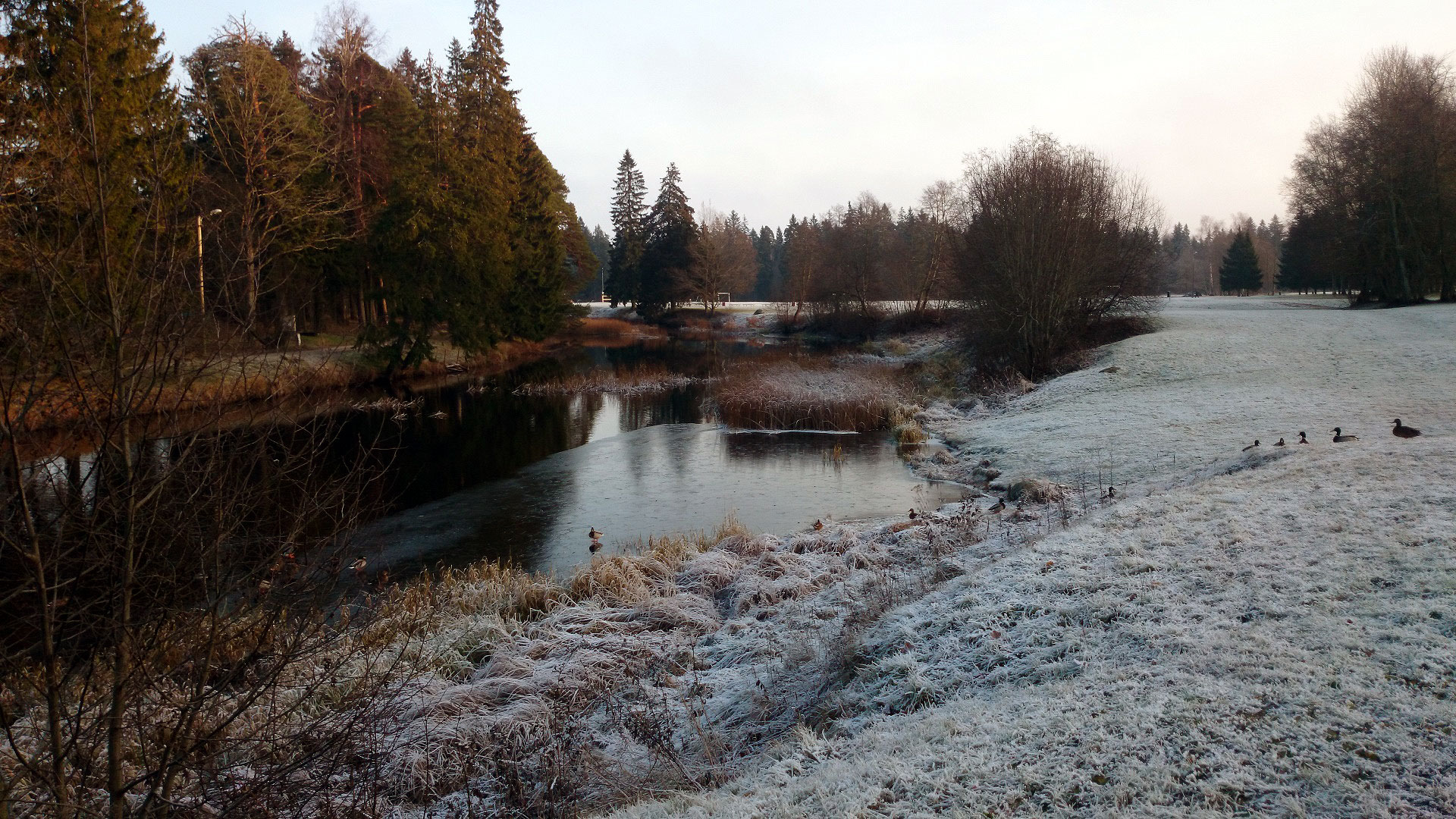
Müramägi in winter

Kehra is located on the banks of the Jägala river, 27 kilometers from the estuary. The river's banks are steep next to the pulp mill and between the manor and the stadium, the river's course is meandering. The river is overgrown, muddy, and slow due to a hydroelectric plant located upstream in the village of Kaunissaare. The pulp mill's dam raises the river's water level in the town. The town and the mill pollute the river with significant amounts of nitrogen and phosphorus compounds. Aavoja river flows into Jägala river just across the river from the pulp and paper mill.

Historically, two streams used to flow into the Jägala river in Kehra. The longer one, called Karukse, flowed just south of the manor, between the current elementary school and Konsum grocery store. The bridge just north of the elementary school was used to cross this stream. Last remnants of the stream were filled in when the medical center was built in 1989. The shorter stream flowed parallel to the current Laste street and was filled in the 1950s, when the apartment buildings were built there.

Kõrvemaa region, covered by vast and sparsely populated forests, lies to the east of Kehra, while the area to the west and north is more densely populated and consists of farmlands, mixed with forests.

Kaunissaare reservoir is about 2 kilometers south of the town, Aavoja reservoir is about 2.5 kilometers east of the town, while Raudoja and Soodla reservoirs are about 9 kilometers north-east of the town.

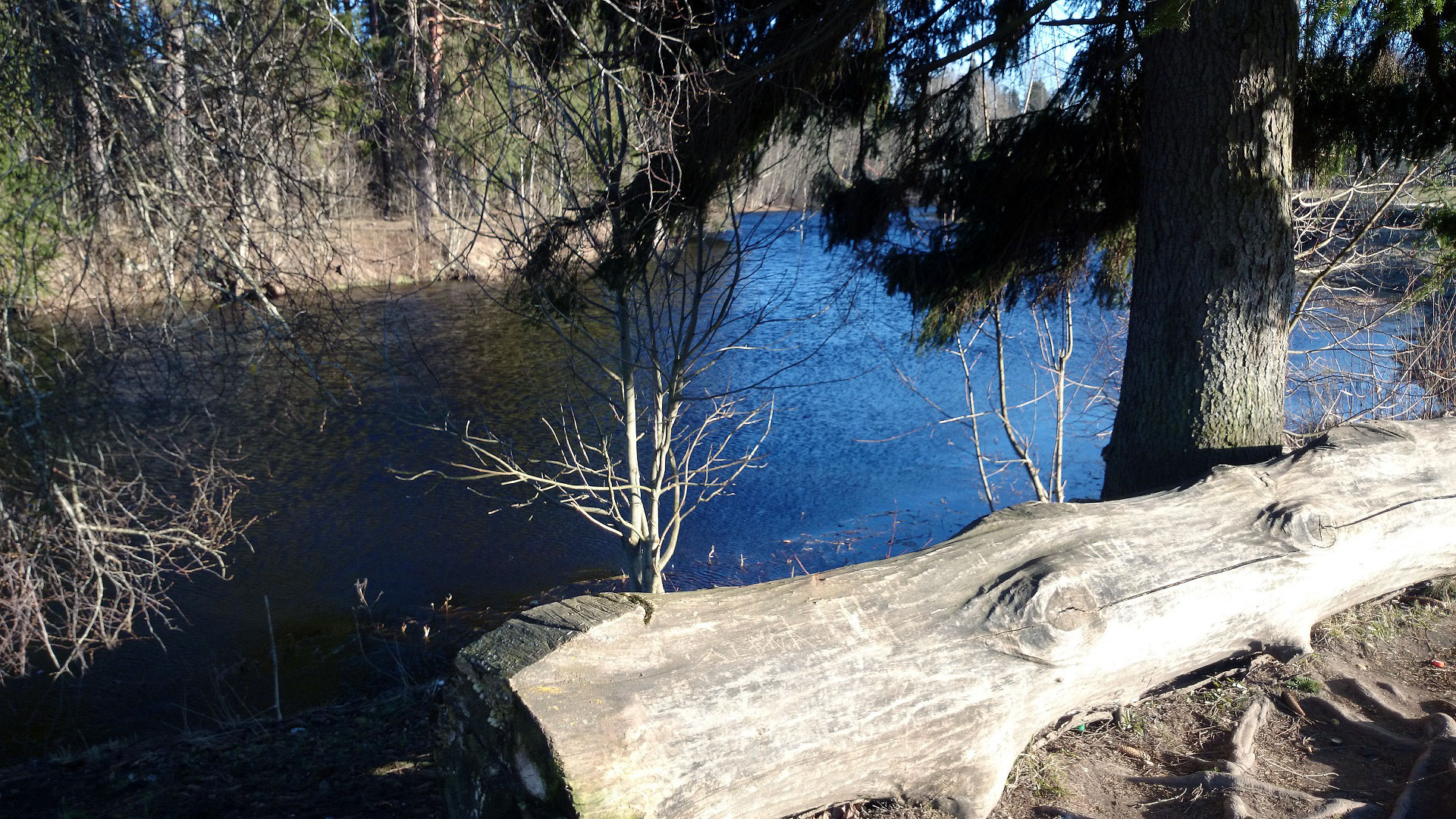
Log next to Jägala river

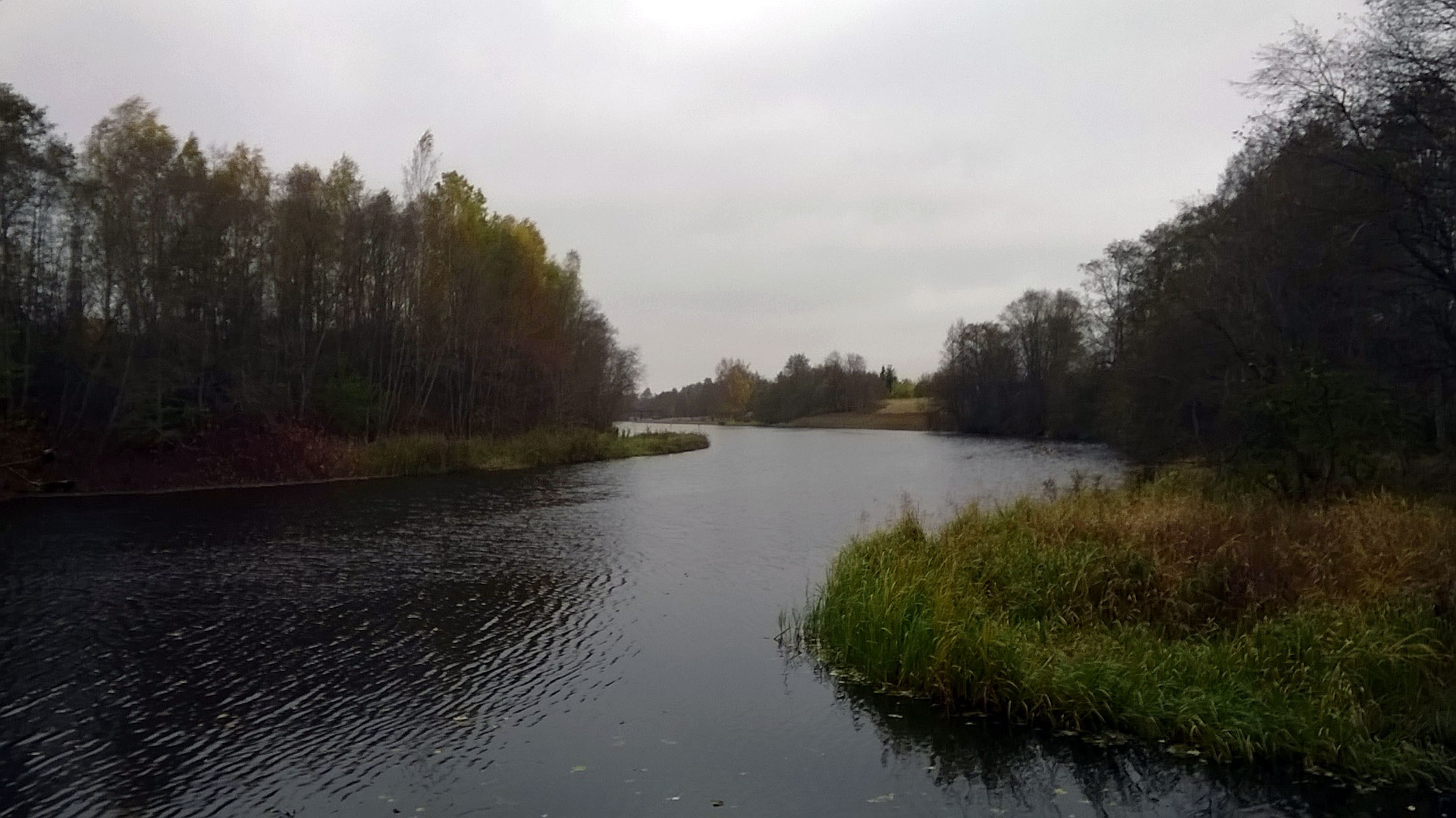
Mouth of Aavoja

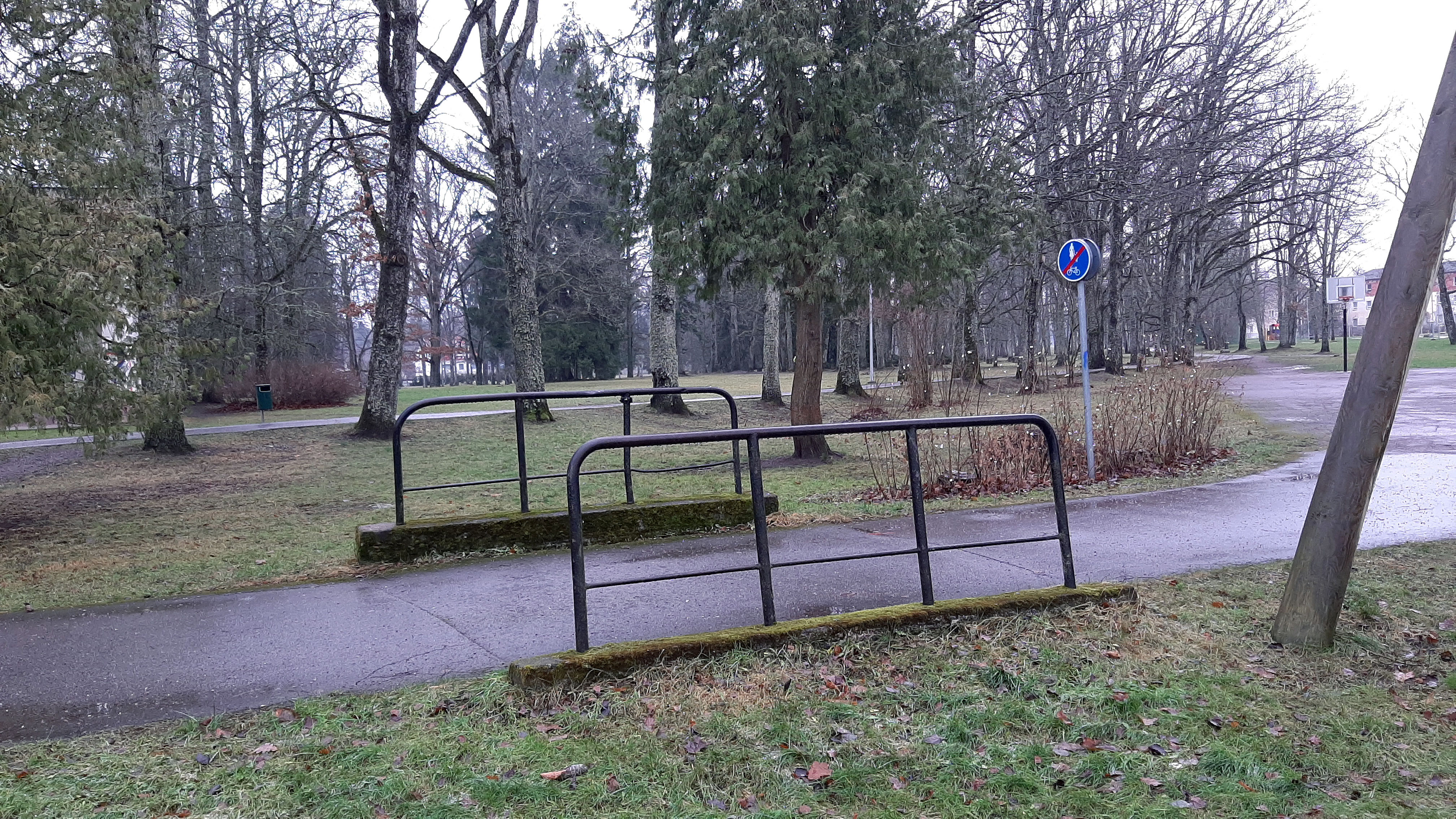
Bridge over historical Karukse stream

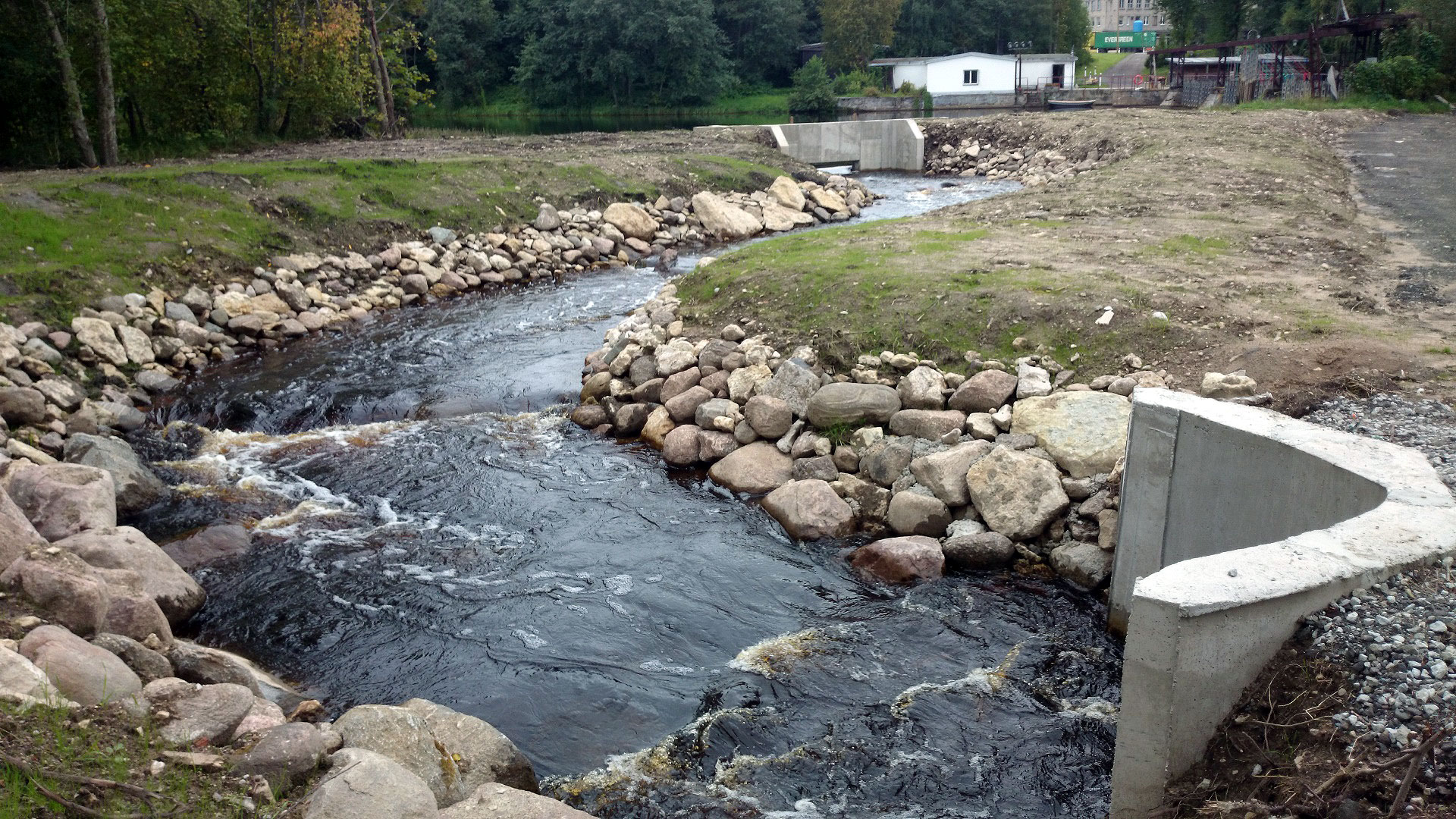
Kehra fish bridge

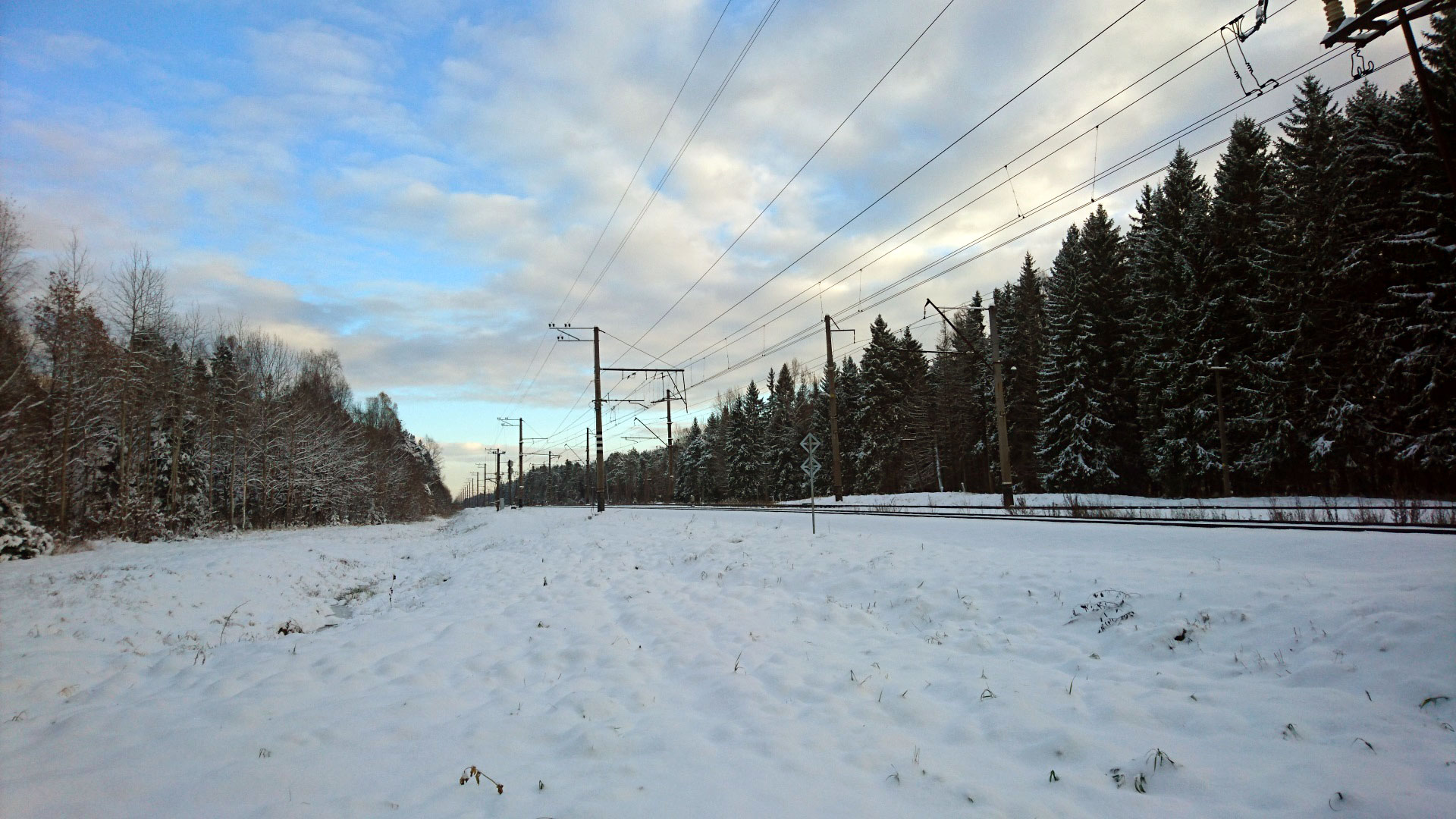
Railroad near Kehra in winter

=== Climate ===
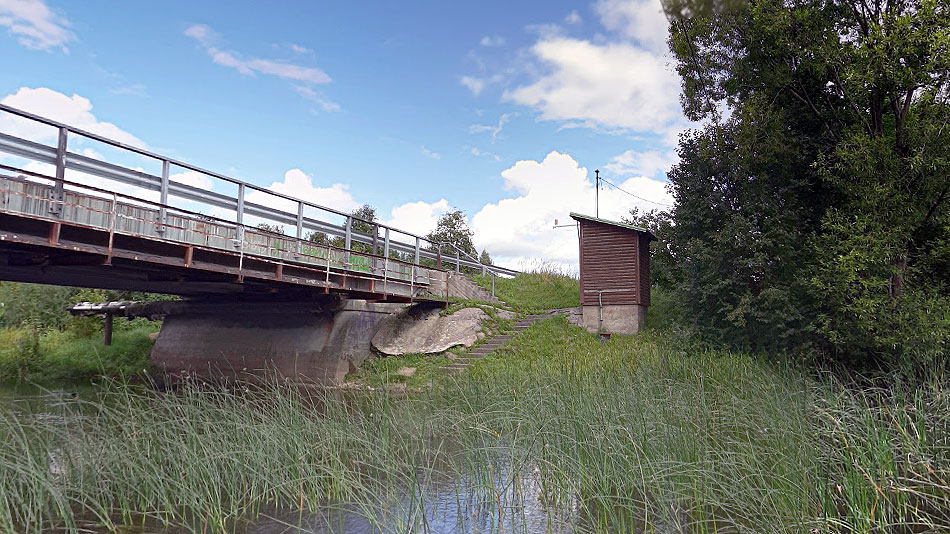
Kehra hydrometric station

Kehra, Estonia(1991–2020)

Climate chart (precipitation, max. and min. temperature)
J	F	M	A	M	J	J	A	S	O	N	D
56 −2 −6	46 −2 −7	34 2 −5	30 8 1	31 14 6	51 18 10	65 22 14	81 20 13	60 15 9	68 9 4	60 3 −1	56 0 −4
- █ Average max. and min. temperatures in °C
- █ Precipitation totals in mm
- Source: MSN Weather
Imperial conversion
J	F	M	A	M	J	J	A	S	O	N	D
2.2 28 21	1.8 28 19	1.3 36 23	1.2 46 34	1.2 57 43	2 64 50	2.6 72 57	3.2 68 55	2.4 59 48	2.7 48 39	2.4 37 30	2.2 32 25
- █ Average max. and min. temperatures in °F
- █ Precipitation totals in inches

Kehra is in the transition zone between maritime and continental climates. On average, the annual temperature is 5.0 °C, the annual rainfall is 700mm, and wind mostly blows from west and south-west. There are about 1750 hours of sunshine per year.

The highest known recorded temperature is 33.4 °C, which was recorded on August 7, 2010, at 18:00. The lowest temperature recorded since 1991 according to MSN Weather was -32.0 °C in February 1996.

Kehra hydrometric station was opened in 1937 and fully automated by 2007. Based on data from the station, the average flow rate of the Jägala river between 1982 and 2019 was 7.69 m^{3}/s. Minimum flow rate was 0.14 m^{3}/s, which was recorded in September 2002 and maximum flow rate was 98.9 m^{3}/s, which was recorded in April 1956. The average water level of the river between 1976 and 2019 was 76 cm. Minimum water level was 25 cm, which was recorded on July 28, 1996, and the maximum water level was 243 cm, which was recorded on January 11, 2005. Measurements were taken 40.34 meters above the sea level.

Kehra Gymnasium has operated their own weather station since 2018.

=== Geology ===
Kehra is situated on the North-Estonian plateau. The surface layer mostly consists of moraine, while the limestone layer is approximately 3–8 meters below the ground. The basement is approximately 200 meters below the sea level.

Põrgupõhja district and western part of the Vana-asula district are located on gleysol soil, while Uusasula, Keskus, the rest of Vana-asula, and the fields between Põrgupõhja and the rest of the town, are mostly located on mollic cambisol soils mixed with gleysol. Ülejõe district is mostly on overly-wet gleysol soils, but bog soil is also found.

The Ordovician aquifer is between 11.5 and 78 meters below the ground, the quality and rate of recharge are poor. The Ordovician-Cambrian aquifer is between 80 and 115 meters below the ground, the quality is good but the supply is small. The Vendian-Cambrian aquifer is between 160 and 230 meters below the ground, the quality is good and the water is pressurized.

There used to be a spring near the current EEKB congregation building, but it was paved closed.

== Demographics ==
Population census
Year	Pop.	±% p.a.
1934	236	—
1950*	1,403	+11.79%
1959	2,823	+8.08%
1970	3,613	+2.27%
1979	3,976	+1.07%
1989	4,053	+0.19%
2000	3,224	−2.06%
2011	2,889	−0.99%
2021	2,759	−0.46%

Population before 1900, Kehra Manor and village
Year	Pop.	±% p.a.
1710	146	—
1712	14	−69.03%
1716	34	+24.84%
1726	65	+6.69%
1781	197	+2.04%
1815	239	+0.57%
1857	321	+0.70%
Source: A. Miidla, Kehra Lood p. 86

Historically, several settlements have lied on the land of the current town. The oldest known settlement, the village of Kehra, is and was located on the northern border of the current town. The village's population has mostly stayed between 130 and 200 since the 13th century. In 1565, two settlements were located south of the village, on the land of the current town. The northern one was called Jaunack and was located where the pulp mill is currently located. The southern one was called Karrock and was located where the manor is currently located. Both settlements were 2 oxgangs in size, while the village of Kehra was 13 oxgangs in size.

It is known that the village of Kehra was practically uninhabited after the Polish-Swedish war in 1615, while Jaunack and Karrock remained seemingly untouched. The village recovered from the demographic crisis by the second half of the 17th century. Kehra Manor was built next to the Karrock mill sometime between 1624 and 1637. By 1660s, the manor owned all the nearby lands, including the village of Kehra, Jaunack and Karrock. The peasants of Kehra Manor lost almost all their belongings after a Russian raid in 1704, as part of the Great Northern War, which in general brought down the birthrate in the Harju-Jaani parish for a year. In 1710, the last year of the war in the area, there is a record cannibalism in Kehra, due to lack of food. The manor's lands were ravaged by the bubonic plague from fall 1710 to fall 1711. Out of the total 146 inhabitants, 102 perished due to the plague while the rest likely fled the area, resulting in a population of only 14 individuals. The population recovered to pre-plague levels in approximately 40 years. By 1856, the village of Kehra had transformed from a clustered settlement to a linear settlement.

Kehra railway station was opened in 1872, but the settlement did not see a big influx of people until the pulp mill started operating in 1938. The pulp mill had 464 workers in 1939. Most of the immigration happened after The Second World War. The official data regarding the population size after the war is classified due to the presence of Soviet military personnel in the area at the time. The first census after the war was conducted in 1959.

The settlement's population was almost entirely Estonian before the pulp mill started operating. By 1959, Estonians constituted 59.3%, and by 1989, only 47.7% of the borough's population due to the influx of foreign workforce from other parts of the Soviet Union. Approximately 400 Ingrian Finns moved to Kehra after the war because they were exiled from their native land near the city of Leningrad.

In 1934, the settlement had a population of 236 and by 1959, the population had grown twelvefold to 2823. The borough saw a steady increase in population until 1985, when it peaked at 4089. Since then, Kehra saw a constant decline in population until around 2020, when it started growing again. As on January 1, 2023, the town had a population of 2694.

Kehra Manor gained borough rights on September 13, 1945, and town rights on August 25, 1993. The town became a part of the Anija parish on December 2, 2002.

The villages of Lehtmetsa, Ülejõe, and Kehra are widely considered to be part of the town due to their proximity. In 2019, the settlements had a combined population of 3555.

Population estimates 1990-2019

Year	Pop.	±%
1990	4,017	—
1991	4,011	−0.1%
1992	3,991	−0.5%
1993	3,883	−2.7%
1994	3,787	−2.5%
1995	3,719	−1.8%
1996	3,736	+0.5%
1997	3,748	+0.3%
1998	3,735	−0.3%
1999	3,732	−0.1%

Year	Pop.	±%
2000	3,224	−13.6%
2001	3,212	−0.4%
2002	3,214	+0.1%
2003	3,270	+1.7%
2004	3,160	−3.4%
2005	3,080	−2.5%
2006	3,070	−0.3%
2007	3,020	−1.6%
2008	2,980	−1.3%
2009	2,990	+0.3%

Year	Pop.	±%
2010	2,890	−3.3%
2011	2,860	−1.0%
2012	2,950	+3.1%
2013	2,877	−2.5%
2014	2,792	−3.0%
2015	2,754	−1.4%
2016	2,615	−5.0%
2017	2,639	+0.9%
2018	2,641	+0.1%
2019	2,639	−0.1%

Source: 1990-2002: Anija Valla Arengukava 2003

2003-2017: Estonian Statistics Database

2018-2019: Estonian Statistics Database

Ethnic Composition 1934-2021
Ethnicity	1934		1959		1970		1979		1989		2000		2011		2021	
Ethnicity	amount	%	amount	%	amount	%	amount	%	amount	%	amount	%	amount	%	amount	%
Estonians	214	90.7	1651	59.3	2060	57.5	2250	56.6	1935	47.7	1642	50.9	1531	53.0	1506	54.6
Russians	15	6.36	-	-	1013	28.3	1229	30.9	1481	36.5	1135	35.2	1006	34.8	848	30.7
Ukrainians	-	-	-	-	68	1.90	84	2.11	198	4.89	-	-	154	5.33	209	7.58
Belarusians	-	-	-	-	80	2.23	71	1.79	111	2.74	-	-	62	2.15	59	2.14
Finns	-	-	-	-	232	6.48	229	5.76	207	5.11	-	-	33	1.14	18	0.65
Jews	-	-	-	-	4	0.11	7	0.18	1	0.02	-	-	6	0.21	4	0.14
Latvians	0	0.00	-	-	5	0.14	7	0.18	4	0.10	-	-	5	0.17	6	0.22
Germans	4	1.69	-	-	-	-	18	0.45	7	0.17	-	-	12	0.42	12	0.43
Tatars	-	-	-	-	-	-	16	0.40	4	0.10	-	-	0	0.00	0	0.00
Poles	-	-	-	-	-	-	11	0.28	11	0.27	-	-	6	0.21	10	0.36
Lithuanians	-	-	-	-	21	0.59	24	0.60	26	0.64	-	-	17	0.59	17	0.62
unknown	2	0.85	0	0.00	0	0.00	0	0.00	0	0.00	5	0.16	6	0.21	13	0.47
other	1	0.42	1134	40.7	97	2.71	30	0.75	68	1.68	442	13.7	51	1.77	56	2.03
Total	236	100	2785	100	3580	100	3976	100	4053	100	3224	100	2889	100	2759	99.9

== Economy ==
Some of the largest companies in Kehra include:

- Horizon Tselluloosi ja Paberi AS - manufacture of paper products
- Multimek Baltic OÜ - manufacture of fabricated metal products
- Narvo OÜ - manufacture of sawn timber
- Velko AV OÜ - infrastructure management
- Year AS - manufacture of designer clothes
- Kehra Pagar OÜ - manufacture of bakery products

== Infrastructure ==
=== Transportation ===
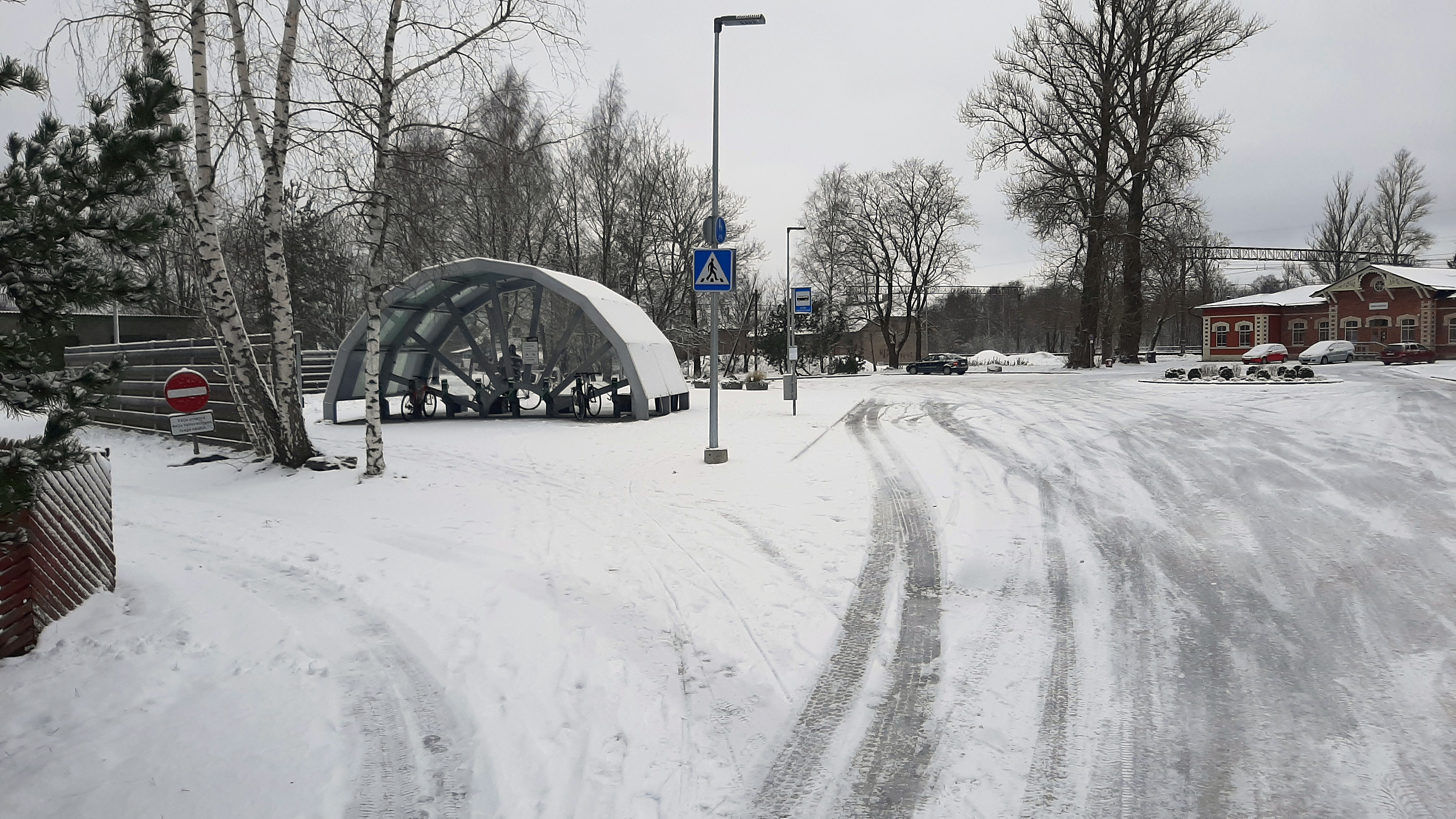
Kehra bus stop

Raudoja-Vikipalu-Kehra and Soodla-Kehra roads terminate north-east of the paper mill, just outside of the town's limits. Kose-Jägala highway passes through Kehra on its western border. Raasiku-Kehra road is located 550 meters north of the town's limits on the Kose-Jägala highway. Kehra is located approximately 32.8 kilometers from the outer edge of Tallinn through Kose-Jägala, Jägala-Käravete, and Tallinn-Narva highways. The journey takes approximately 23 minutes.

Kehra has a station on the Tallinn-Narva railway, which is served by Elron. Aegviidu, Tartu, Narva, and Rakvere trains stop in Kehra. Aegviidu trains take around 28 minutes to reach Ülemiste station in Tallinn while other trains take around 19 minutes. In 2013, Elron named one of their trains after the town's historic German name, Kedder.

Preceding station	Elron	Following station
Raasiku towards Tallinn	Tallinn–Tartu–Valga	Lahinguvälja towards Valga
Raasiku towards Tallinn	Tallinn–Tartu–Koidula	Lahinguvälja towards Koidula
Raasiku towards Tallinn	Tallinn–Narva	Lahinguvälja towards Narva
Parila towards Tallinn	Tallinn–Aegviidu	Lahinguvälja towards Aegviidu

As of 2020, five bus lines were providing local transport in Anija Parish, three of which operate on every workday. There is also a bus line between Kehra and Kose borough.

== Culture ==
=== Sports ===
HC Kehra was established in 1991 and has since become Estonian and Baltic handball champion several times.

Football club Anija JK has operated in Kehra since 2012.

Kehra sports complex was opened on February 18, 2003. It features a sports hall, a gym, a sauna, and a cafe. Handball matches are hosted regularly.

The new renovated Kehra Stadium was opened on October 13, 2016. It features a football field, a basketball field, running tracks, and an athletics field. A disc golf track, an outdoor gym, an artificial hill for sledding and skiing, a sand field, a skating rink, and a beach are located nearby.

Kehra fitness trail is located on the eastern edge of the town, across the river from the stadium, and is mainly used for running and skiing.

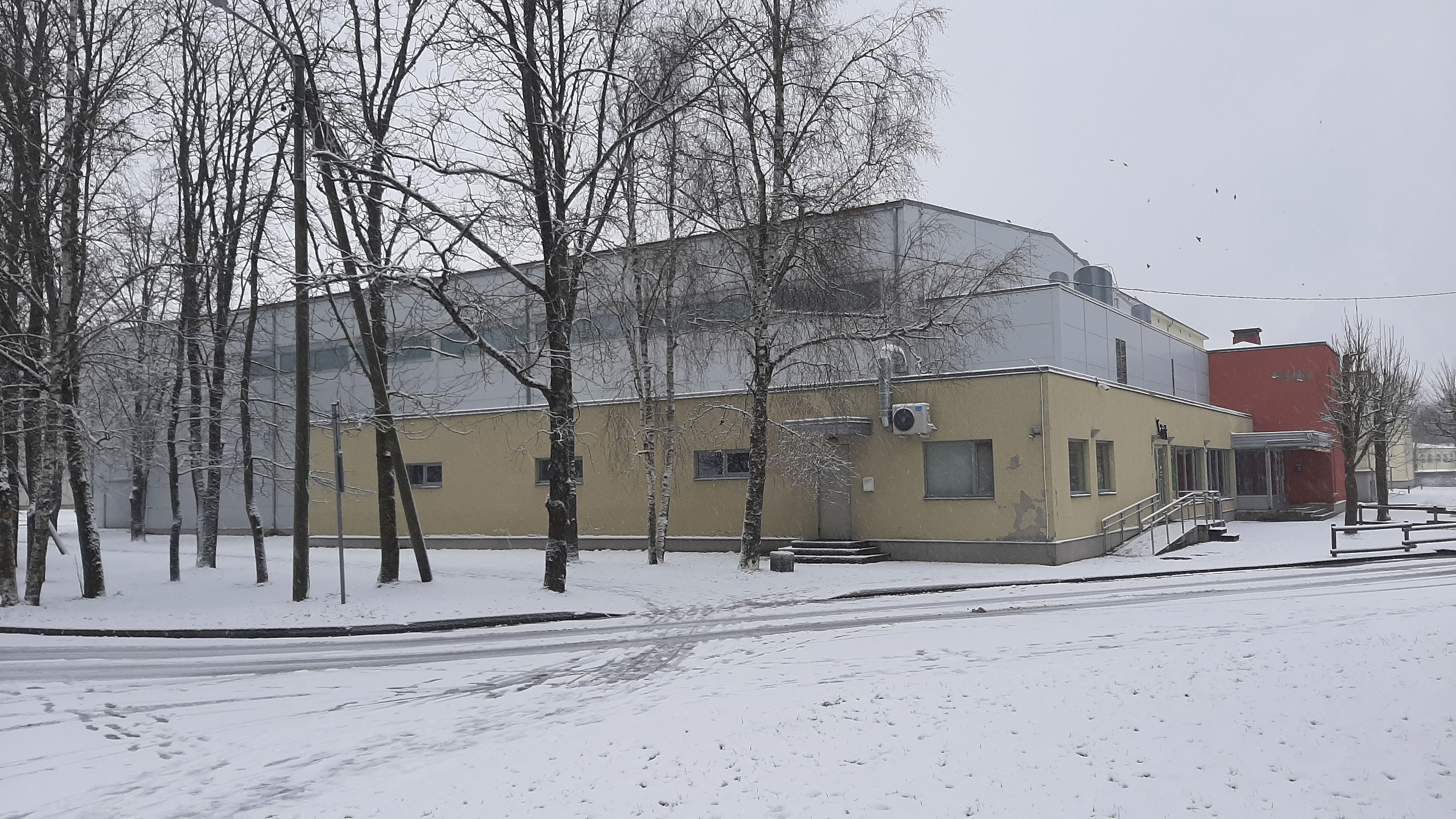
Kehra sports complex

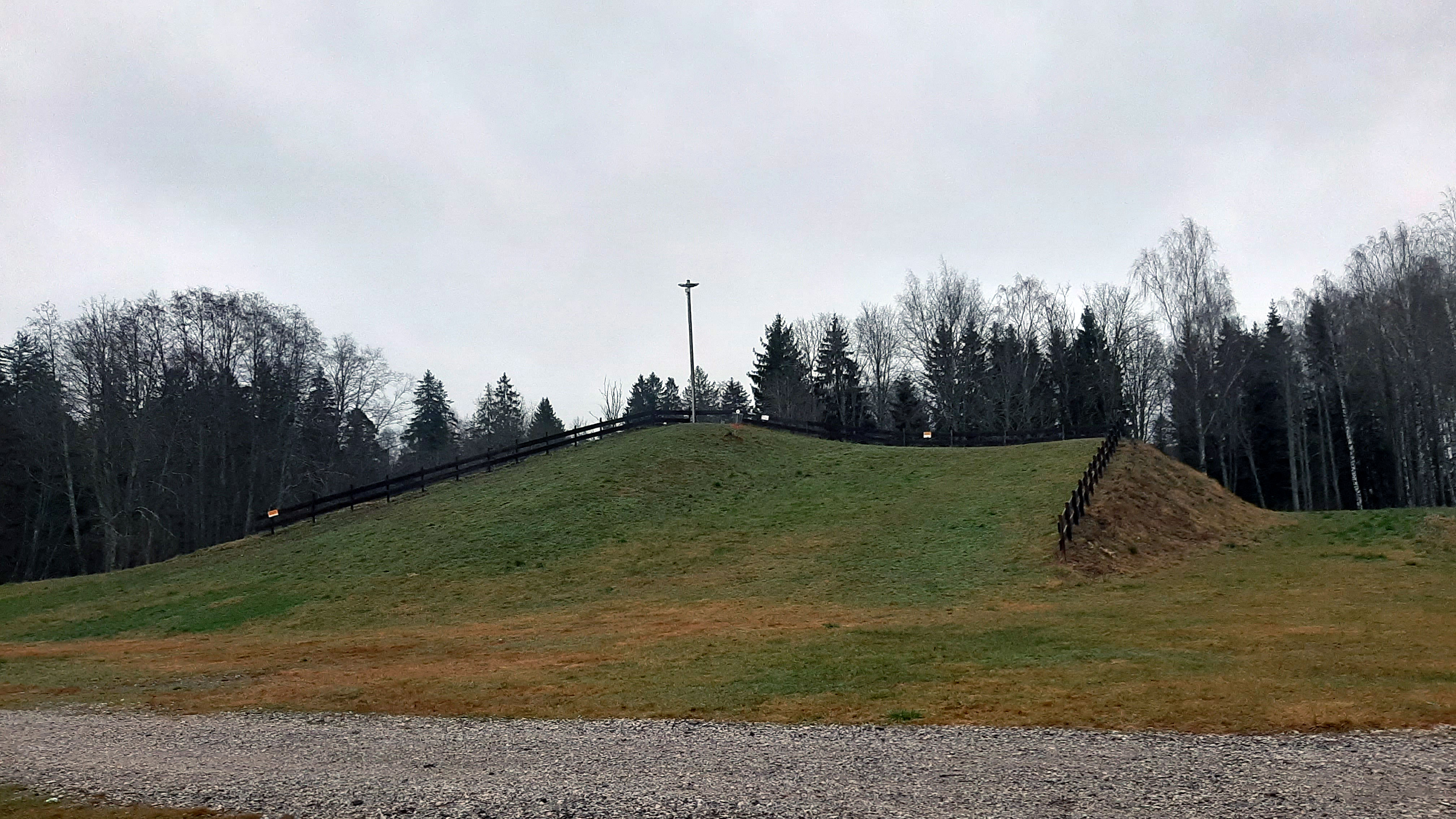
Sitsimägi artificial hill

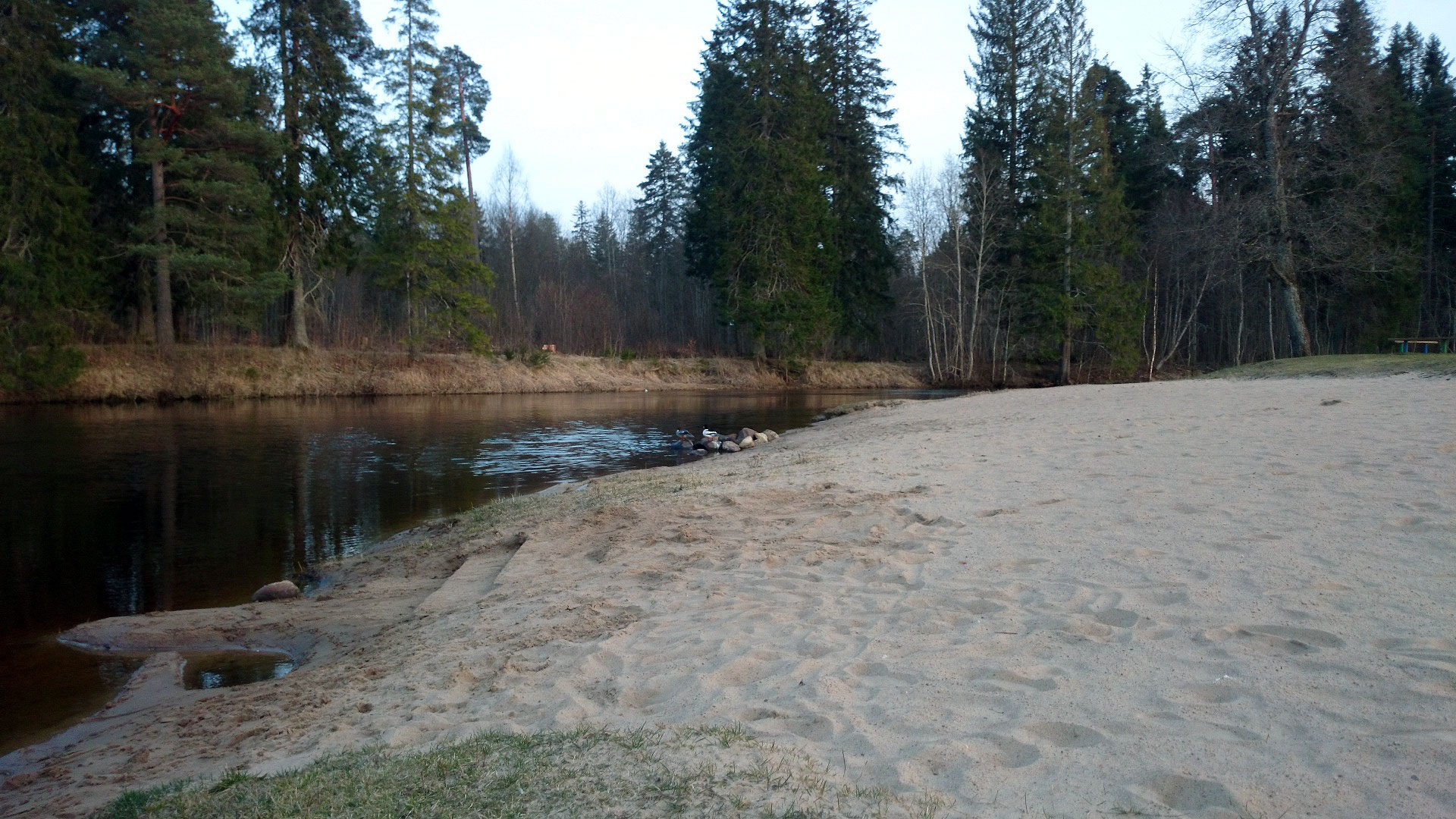
Kehra beach(Lastekas)

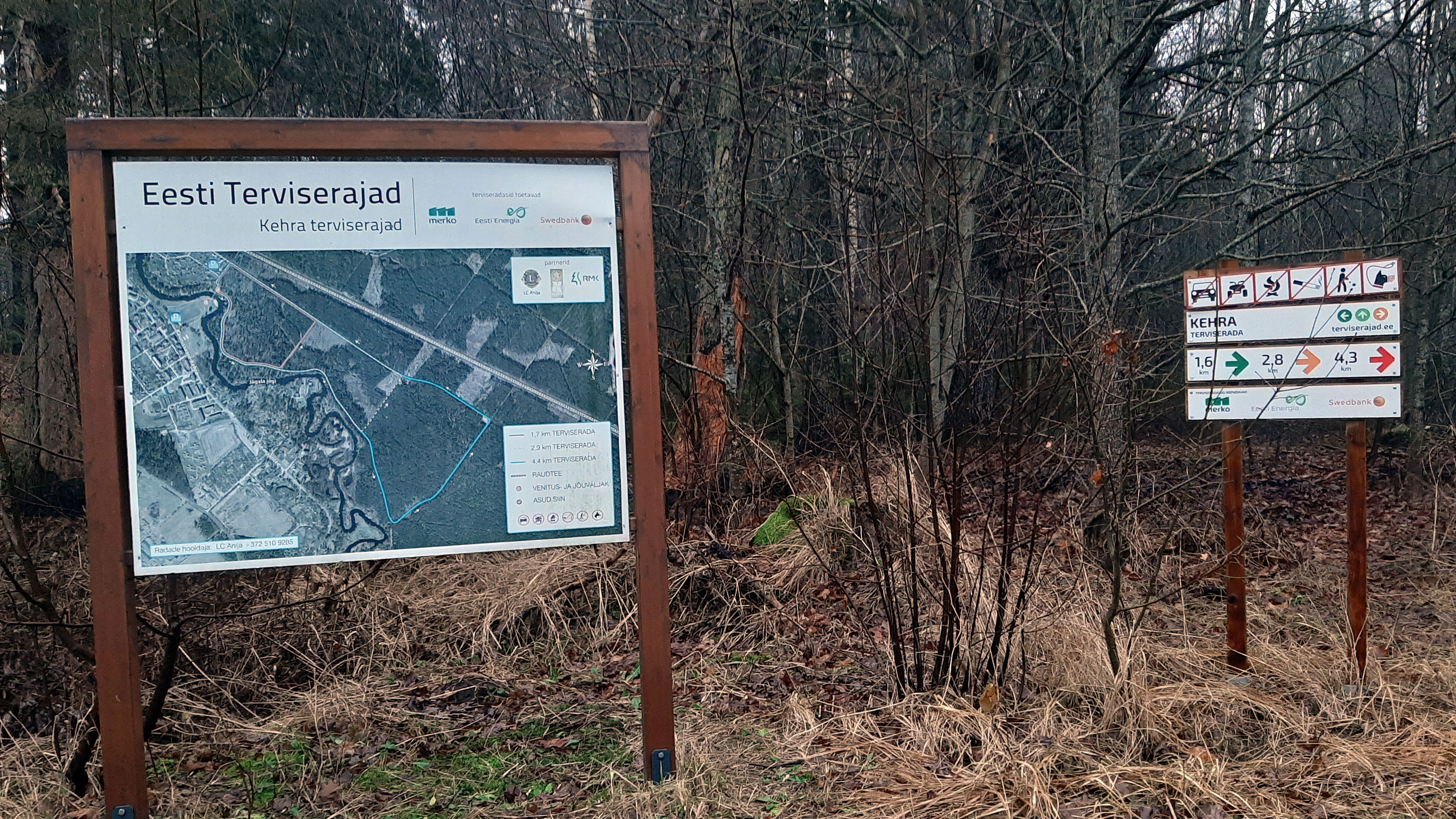
Kehra fitness trail

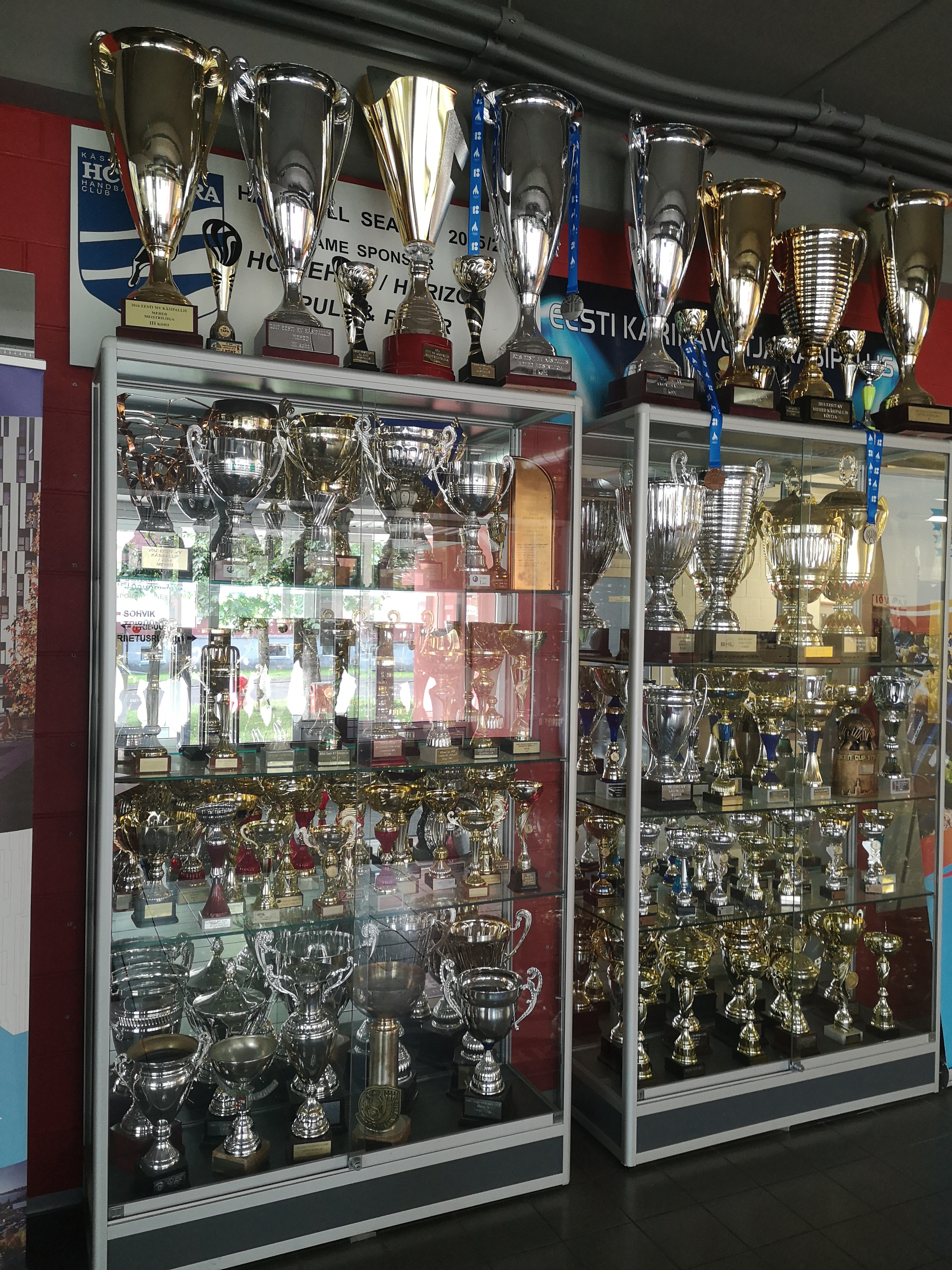
Trophies of HC Kehra

=== Religion ===
EEKB Kehra Congregation and Unity in Christ Congregation currently operate in Kehra.

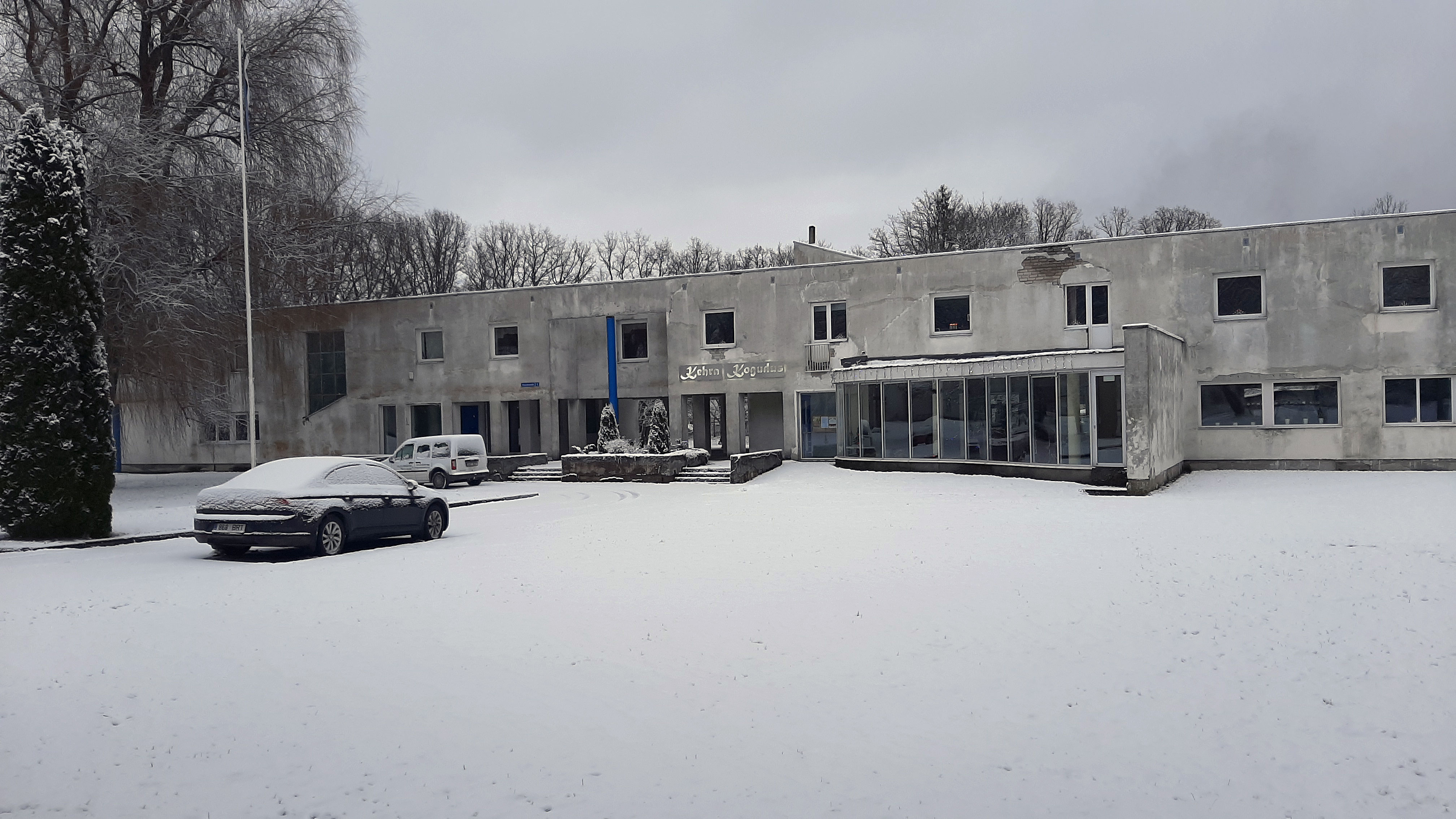
EEKB Kehra congregation

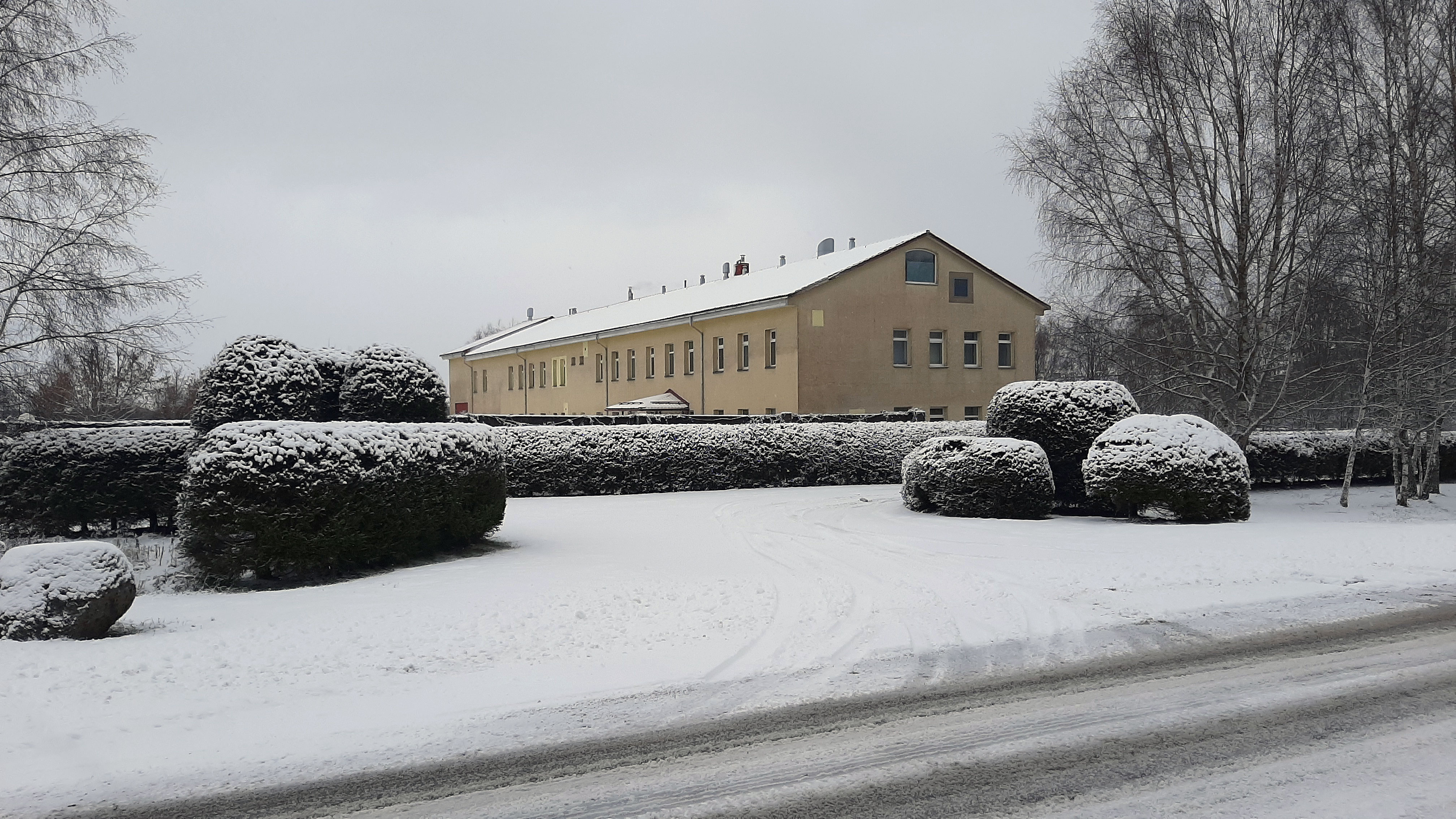
Unity in Christ Kehra congregation

=== Memorials ===
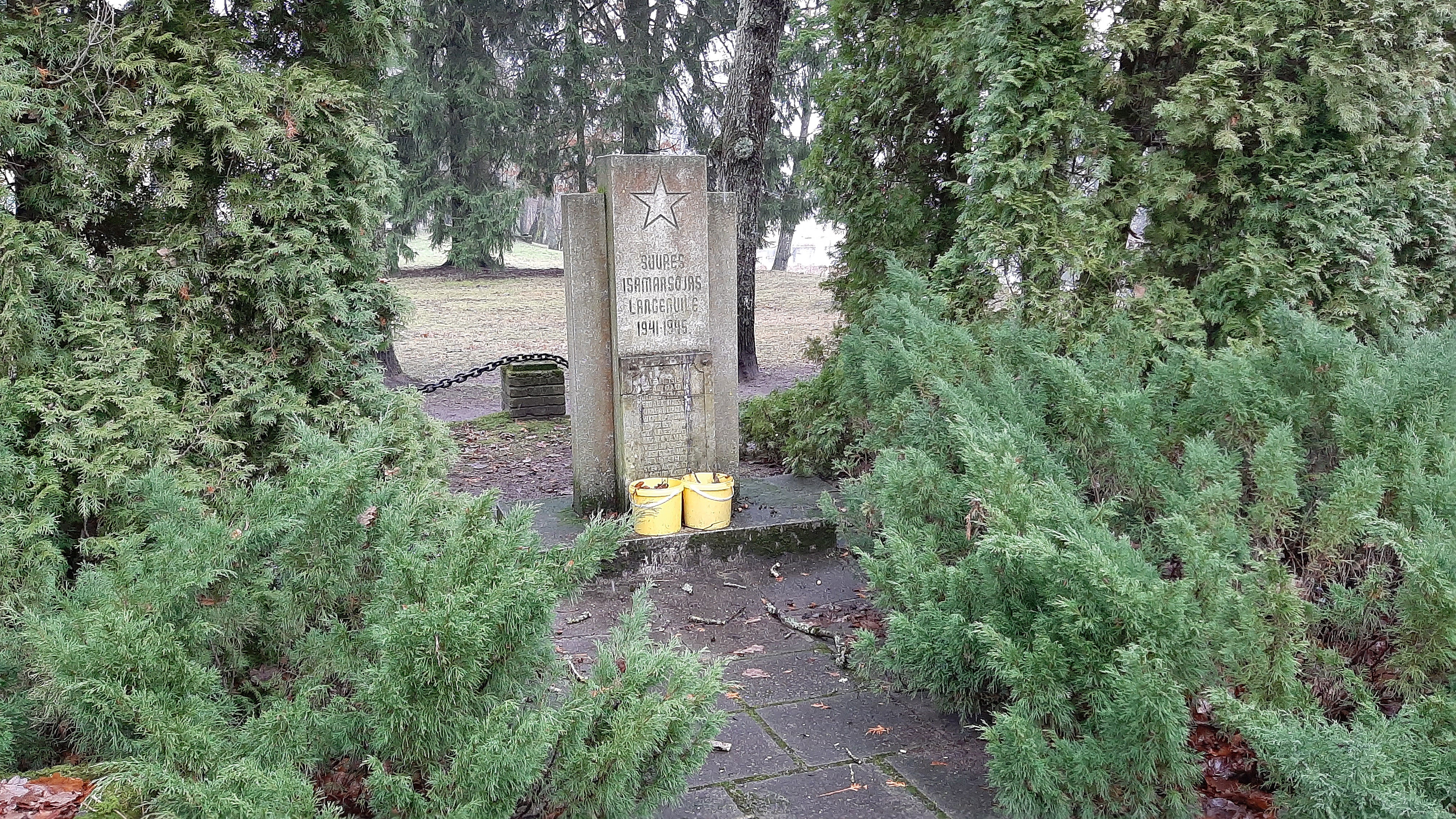
Memorial to those who died in the Great Patriotic War

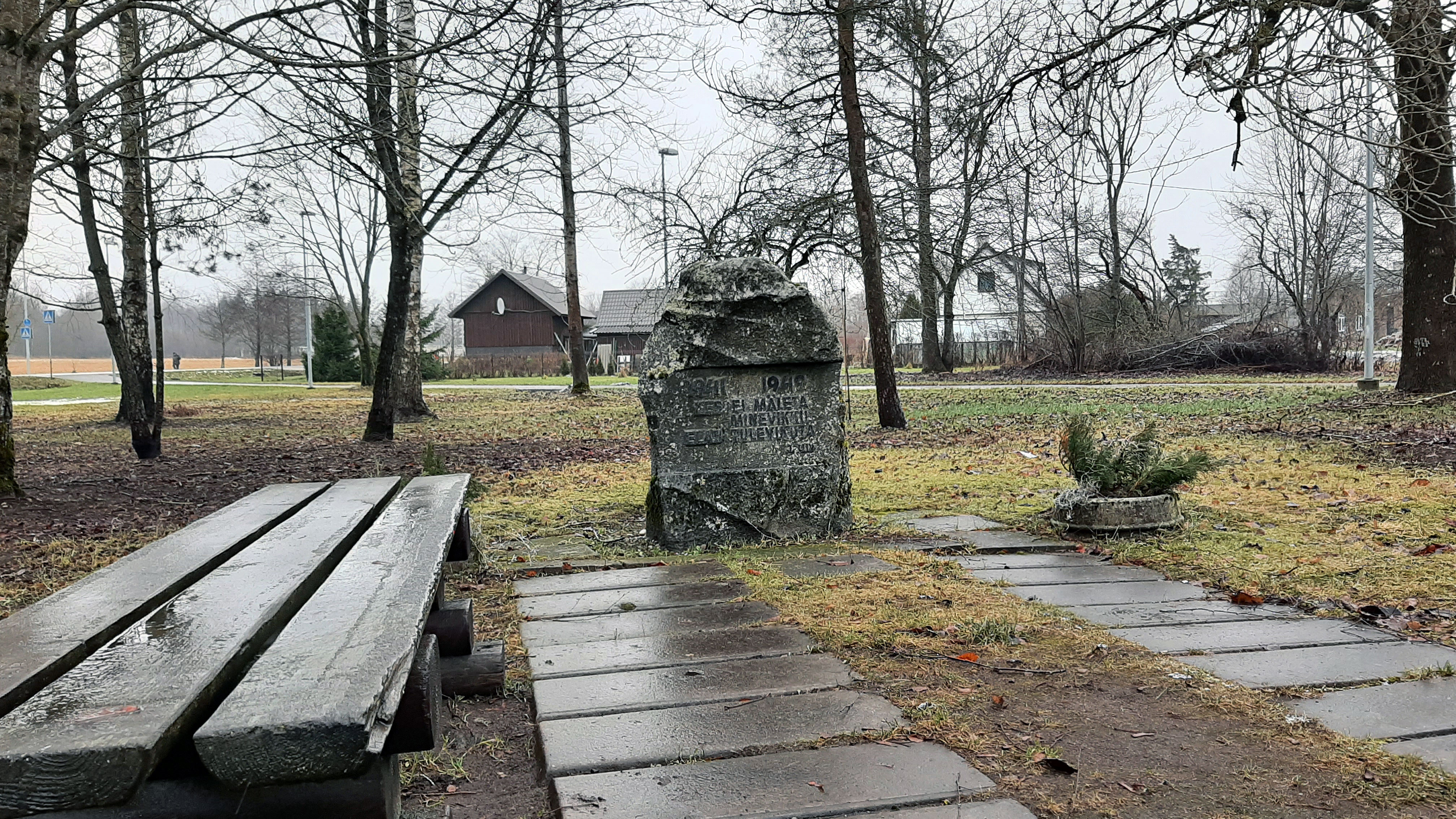
Memorial to those who were forcefully deported in 1941 and 1949

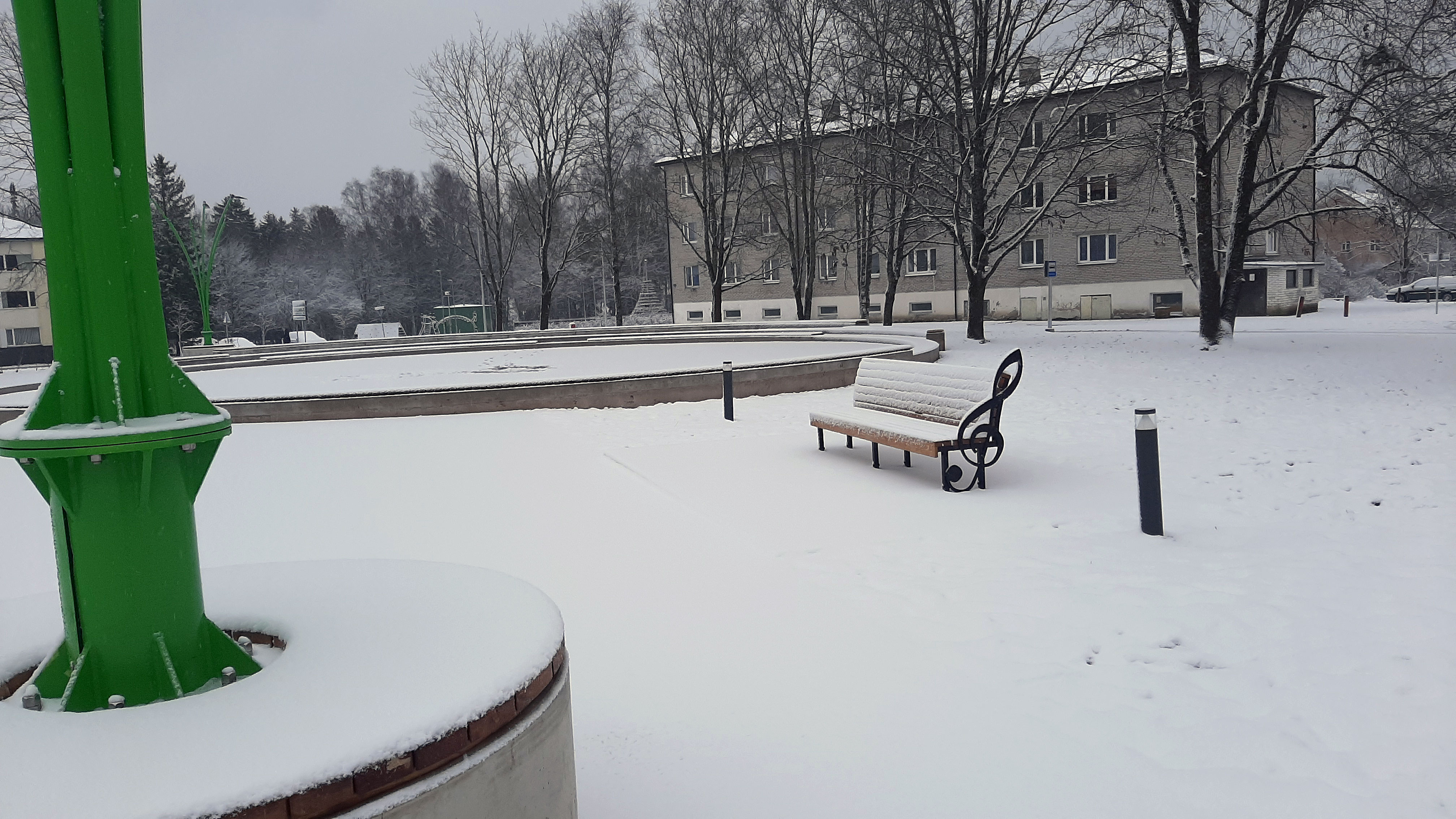
Silvi Vrait memorial bench

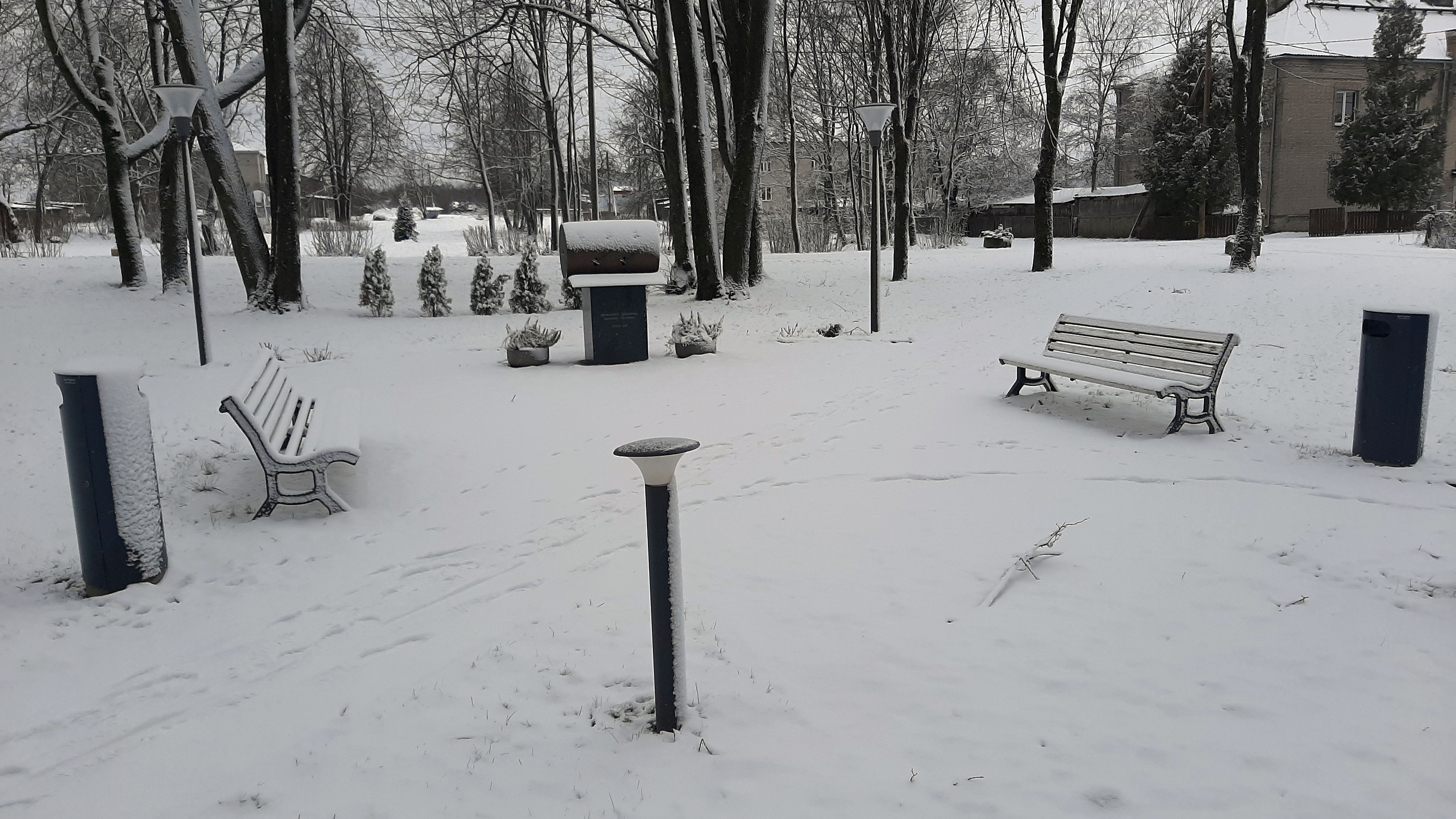
Žanna Botvinkina memorial

=== Notable people ===
- August Vaga (1893–1960), botanist, associated with Estonian Institute of Zoology and Botany
- Olaf Schmeidt (1930 – 2023), botanist and dendrologist, established the Matsi Arboretum
- Marja Kallasmaa (born 1950), linguist, her main field of research has been onomastics.
- Rein Loik (born 1950), politician, former minister of education, elected Mayor of Viimsi in 2017
- Silvi Vrait (1951–2013), singer and music teacher, competed in the Eurovision Song Contest 1994
- Juhan Maiste (born 1952), art historian, chief editor of the Baltic Journal of Art History since 2009.
- Laine Mägi (born 1959), actress, dancer, choreographer, she founded of the Laine Mägi School of Dance, in Pärnu.
- Terje Pennie (born 1960), stage, TV and film actress
- Kare Kauks (born 1961), singer and music teacher
- Karmen Pedaru (born 1990), fashion model, works with Michael Kors
