= Anija Parish =

Municipality of Estonia since 2017

Anija Parish Anija vald
- Municipality
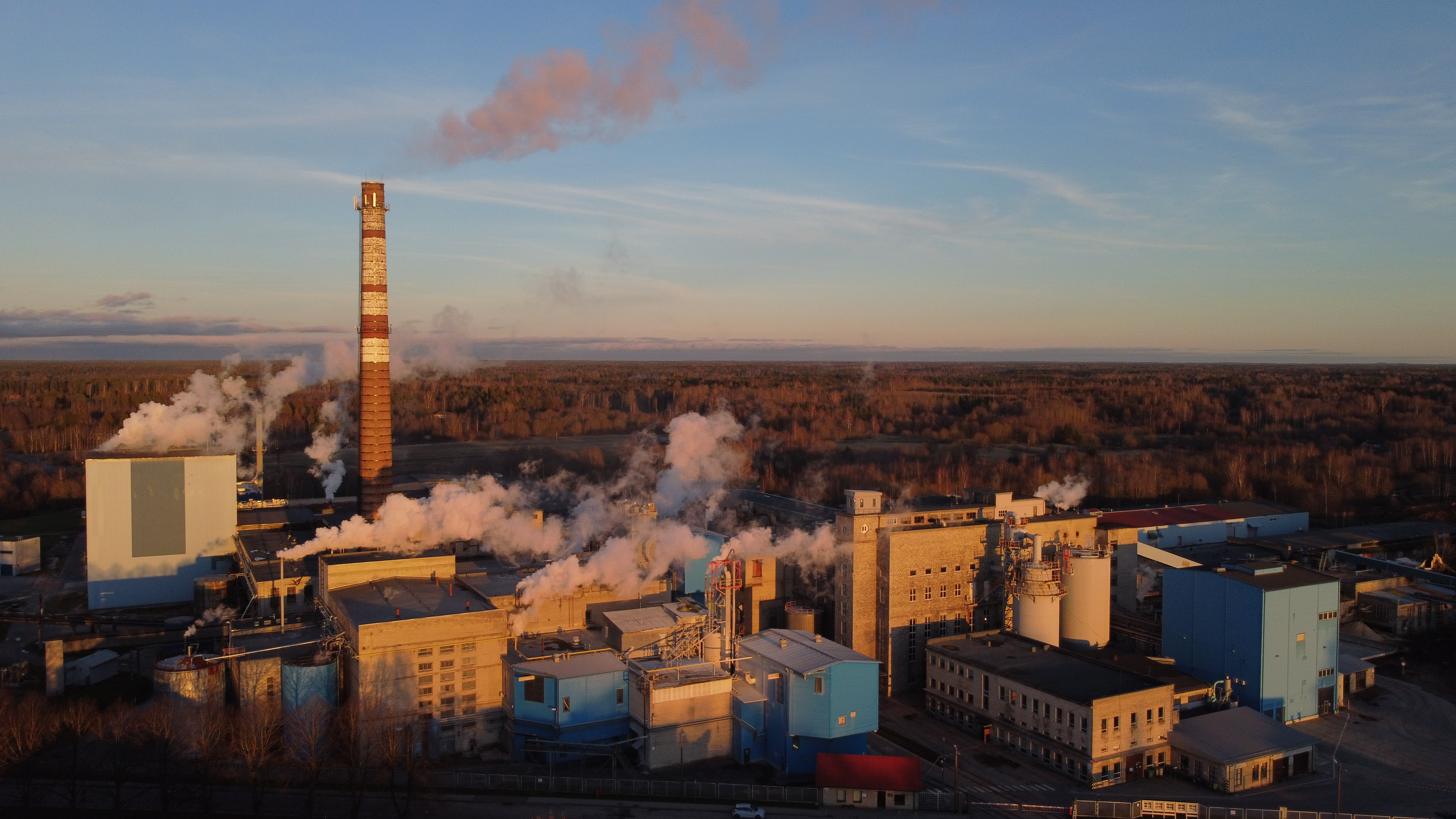
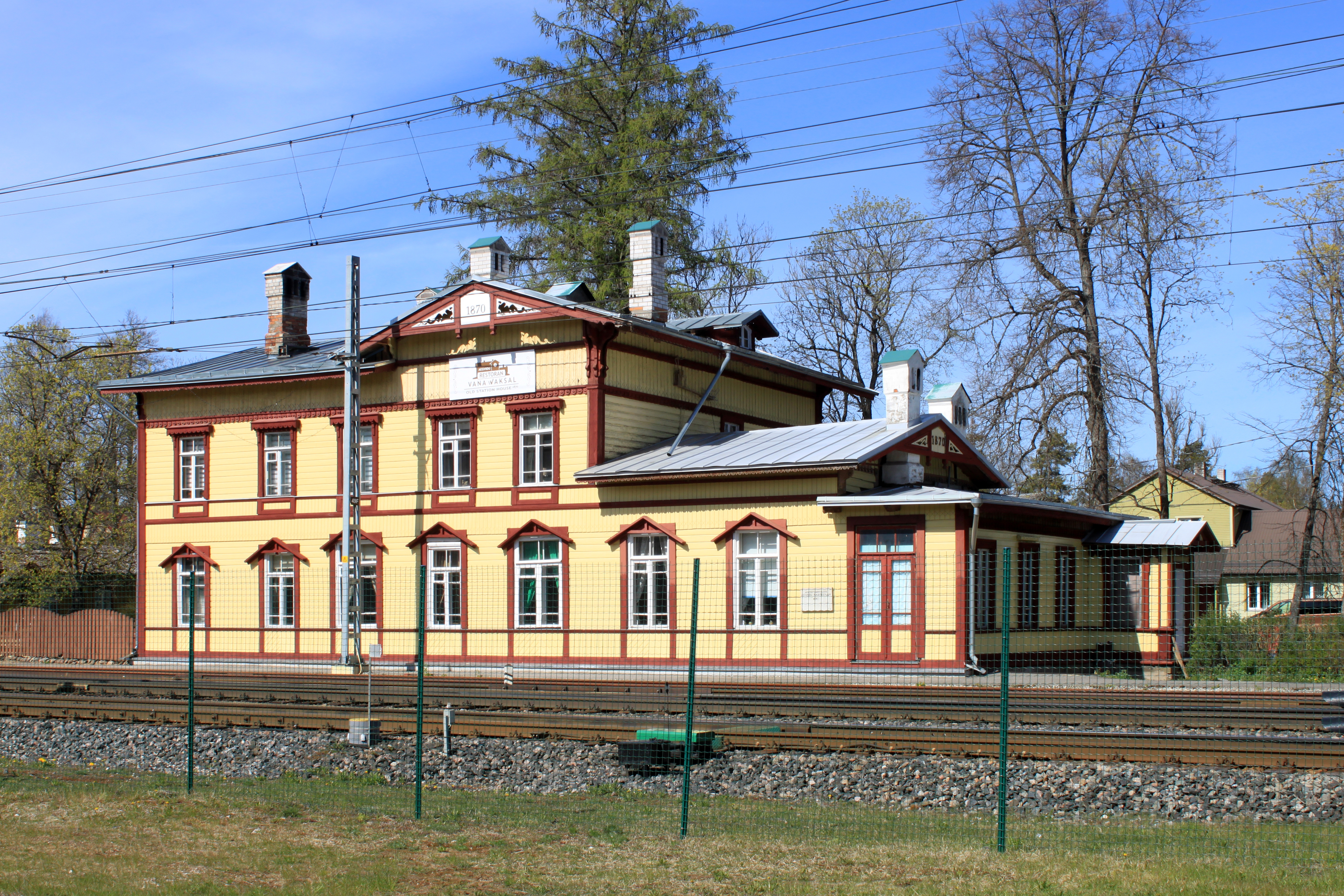
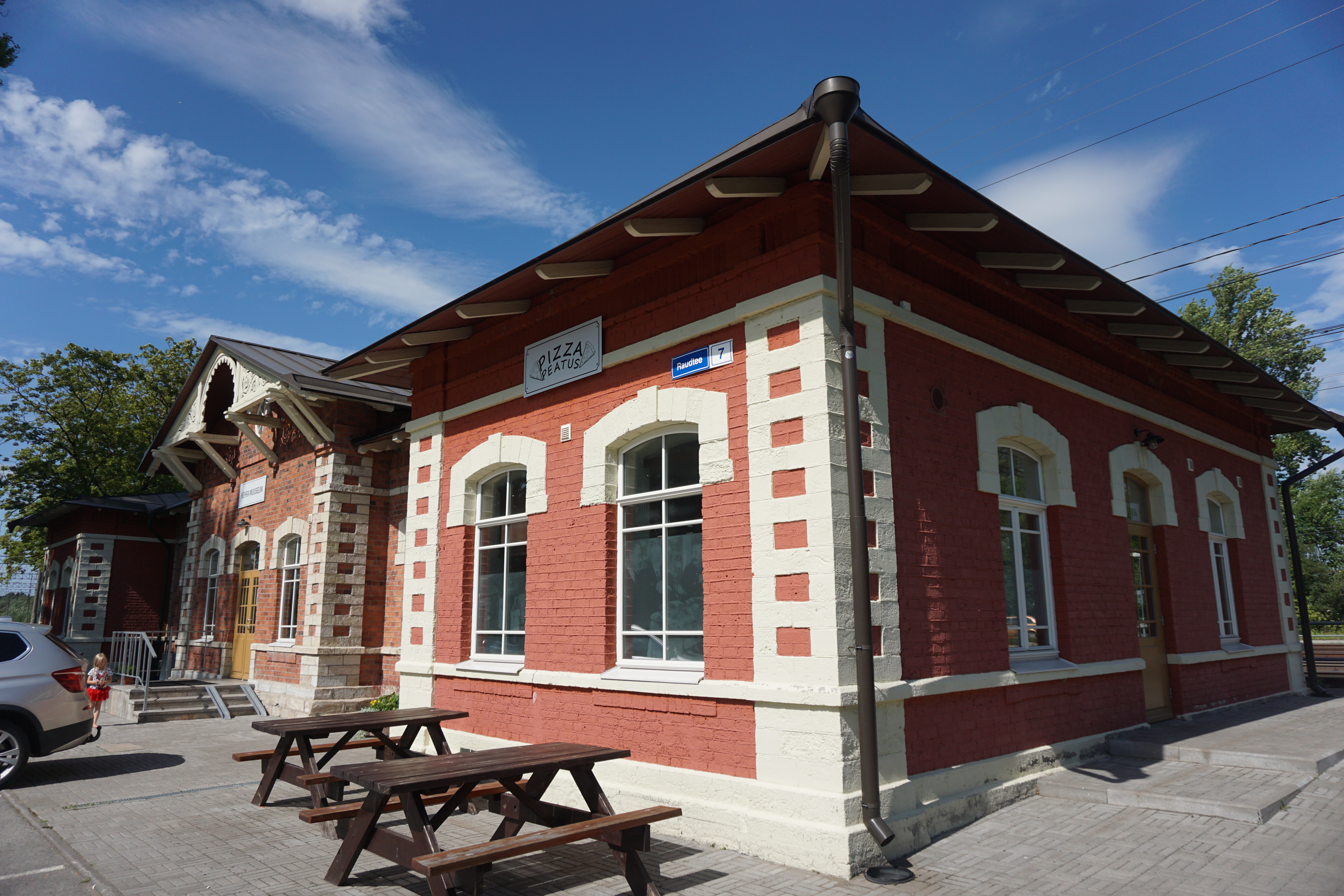
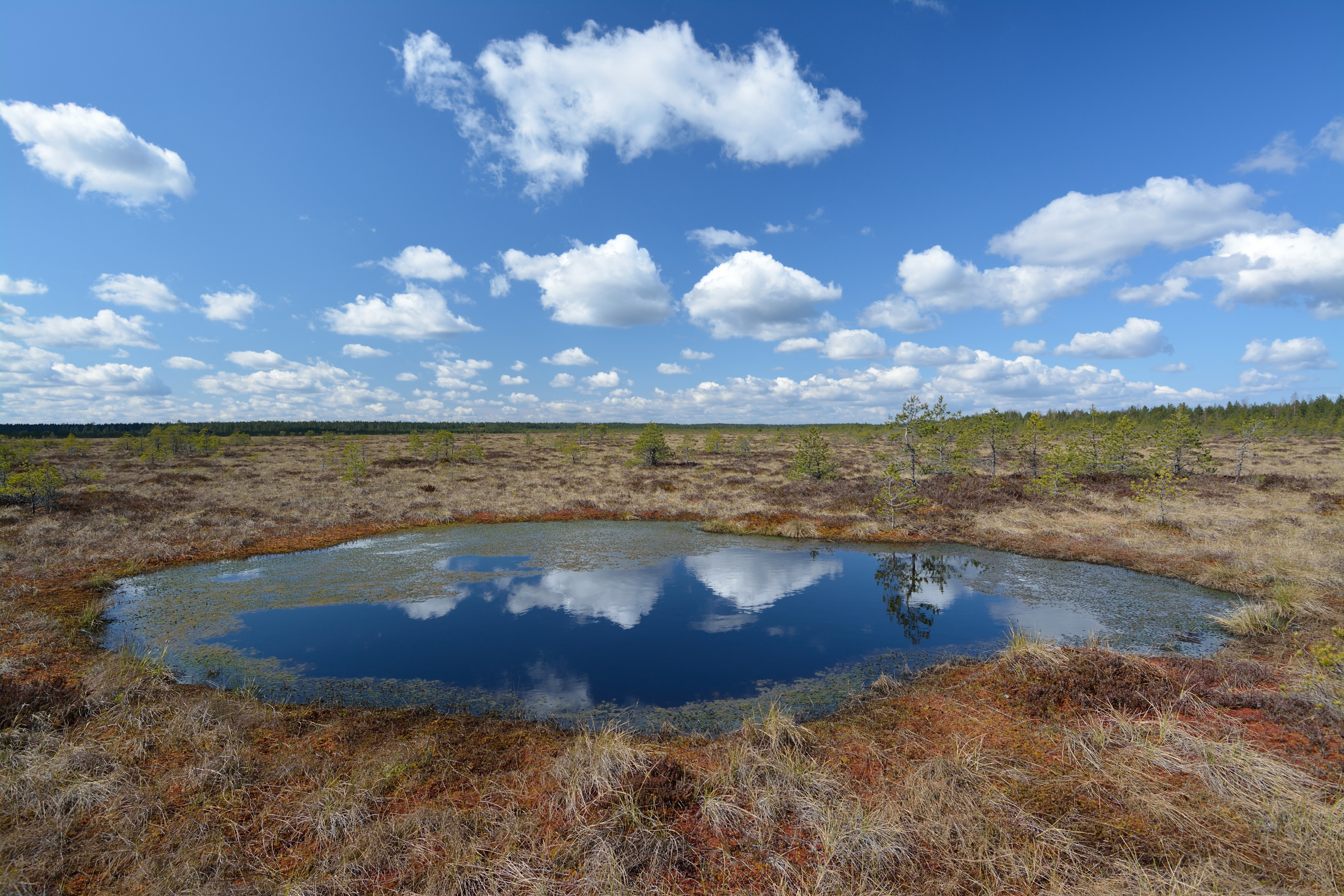
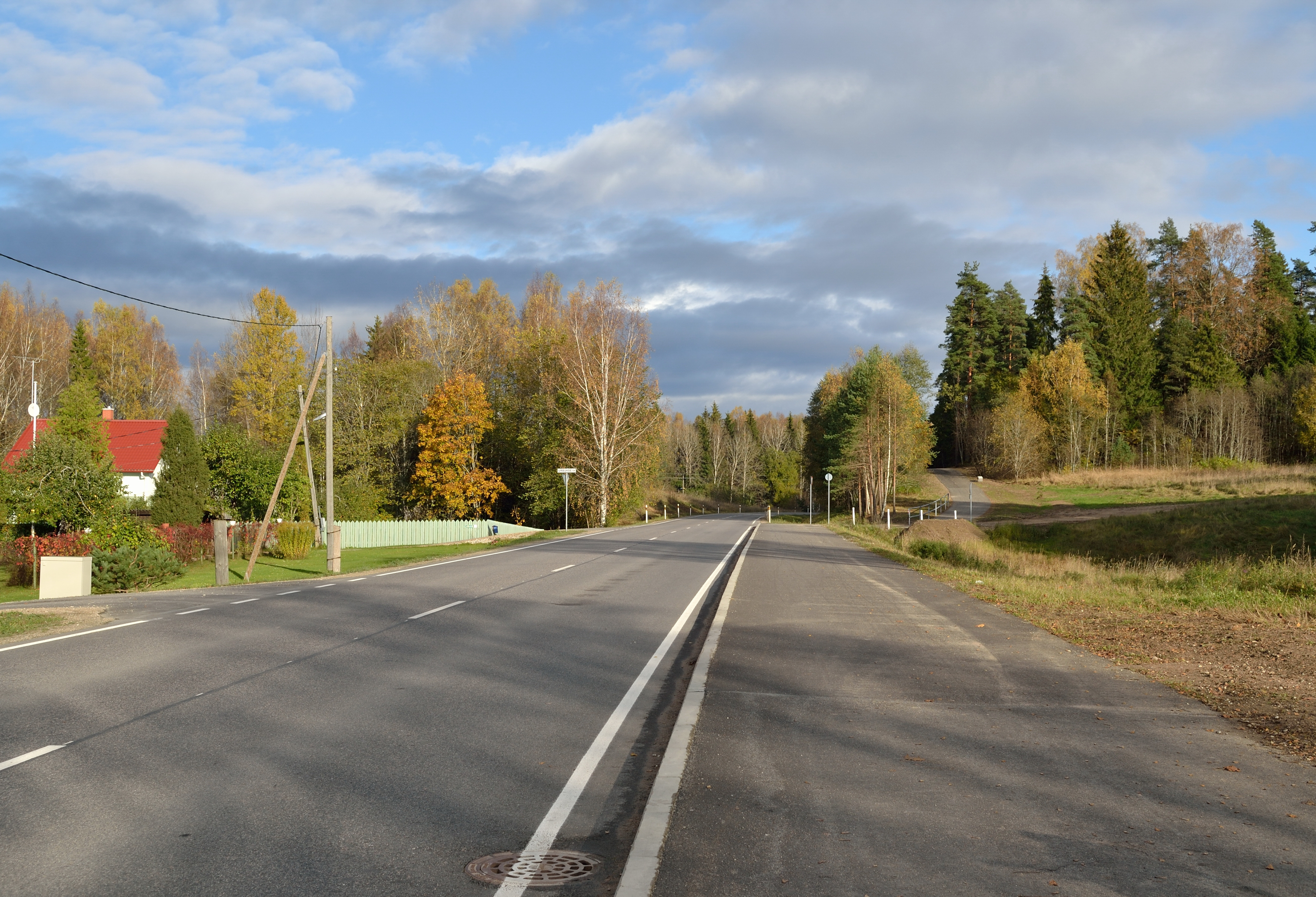
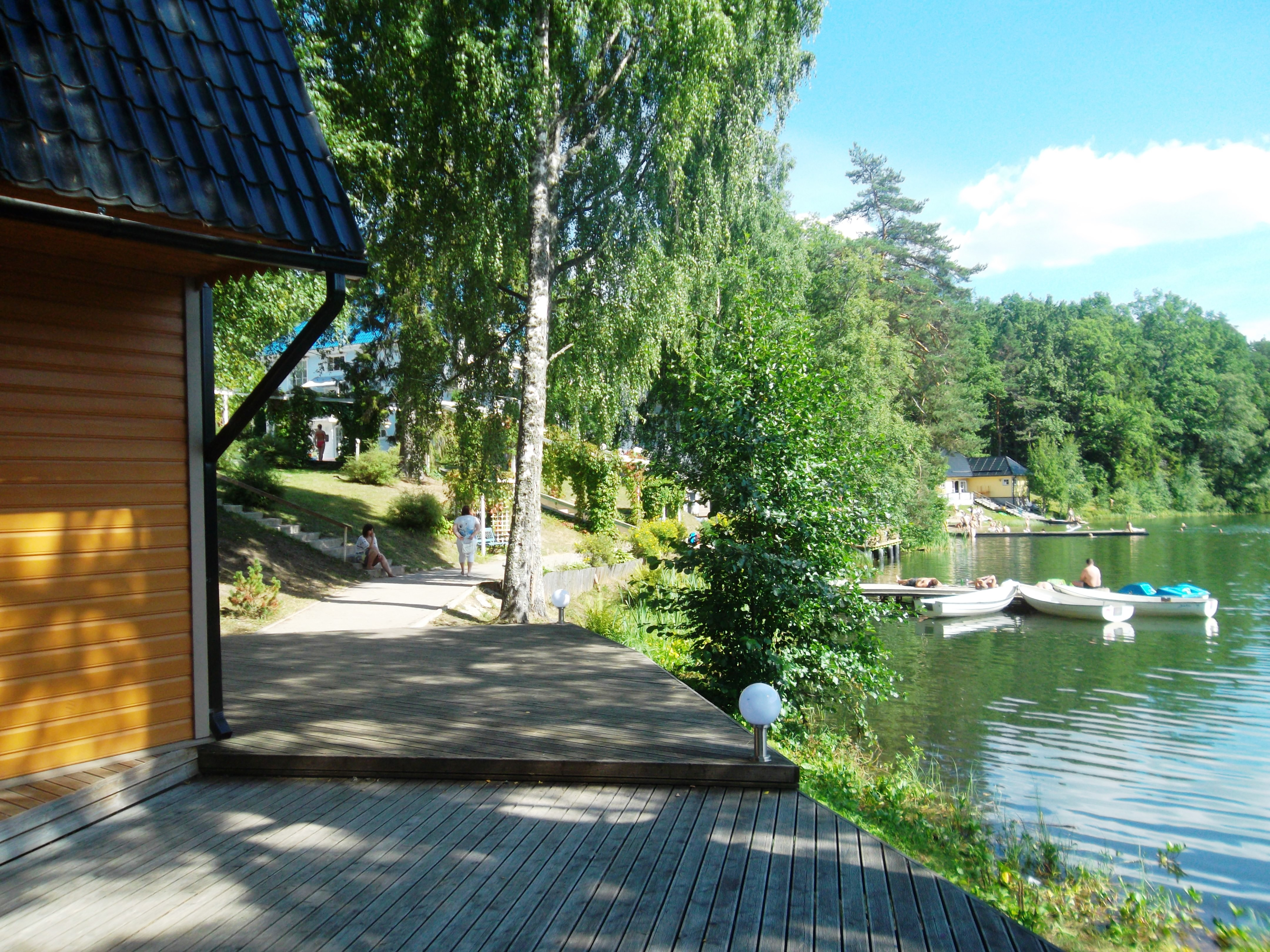
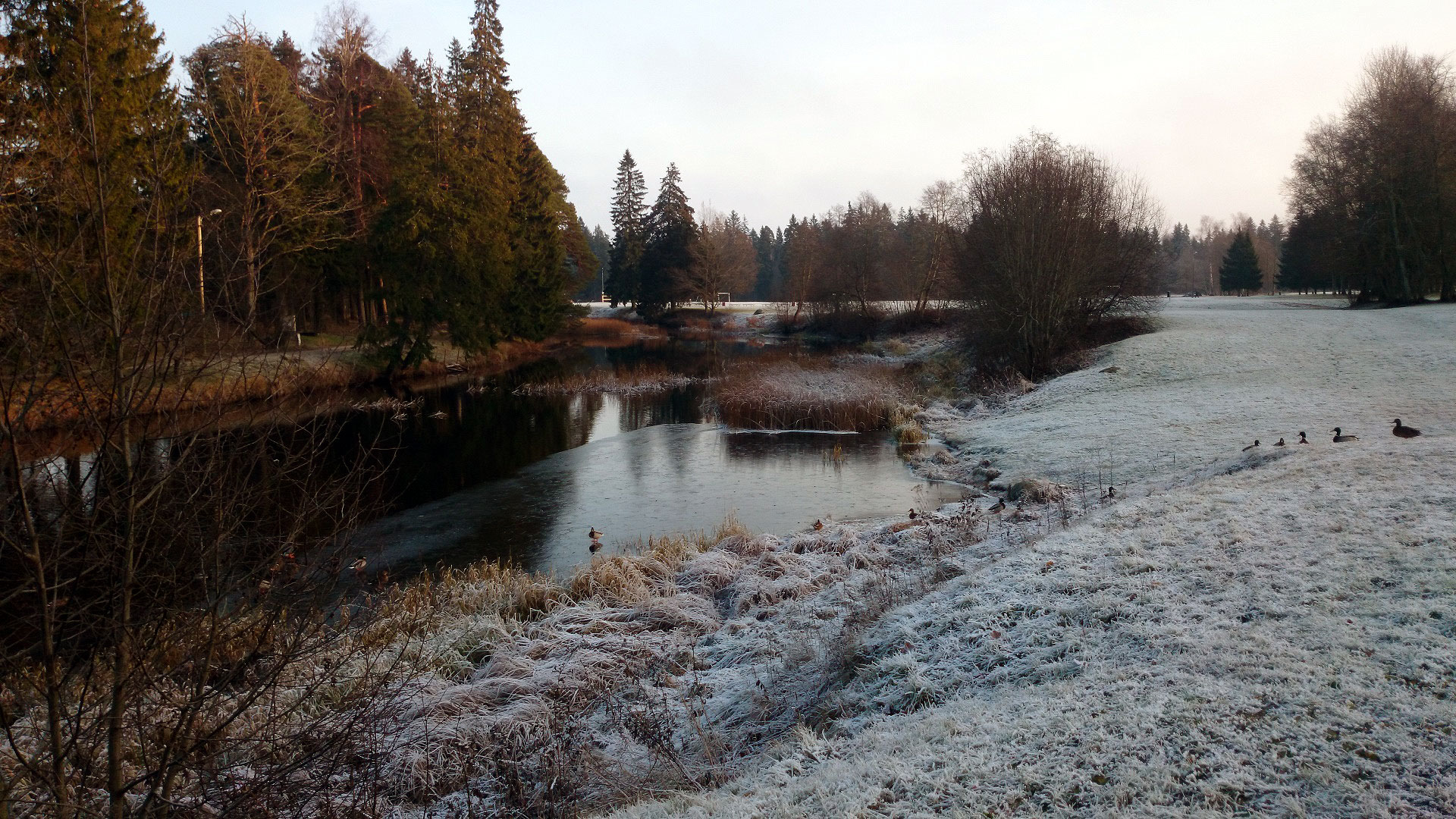
- Kehra pulp and paper mill Aegviidu train station Kehra train station Koitjärve Bog Jägala–Käravete road Nelijärve Jägala river in Kehra

- Flag Coat of arms

- Anija Parish within Harju County.
- Country: Estonia
- County: Harju County
- First established: Late 1866
- Rural Council: August 8, 1945
- Reestablished: January 16, 1992
- Named for: Anija (village)
- Administrative centre: Kehra

Government
  - Mayor: Riivo Noor

Area
  - Total: 532.91 km^{2} (205.76 sq mi)
- Highest elevation (Määrasmägi, Vetla): 104.4 m (343 ft)
- Lowest elevation (Partsaare (village)): 35.5 m (116 ft)

Population (1 January 2026)
  - Total: 6,365
  - Density: 11.94/km^{2} (30.93/sq mi)

Ethnicity (2021)
  - Estonians: 72.3%
  - Russians: 18.7%
  - other: 9.0%
- ISO 3166 code: EE-141
- Website: anija.ee

Anija Parish is a rural municipality in the eastern part of Harju County, Estonia.

The administrative center of the parish is the town of Kehra, while the borough of Aegviidu and the village of Alavere are also notable. In total, the parish consists of 33 settlements. As of 1 January 2026, the parish had 6,365 residents.

== Early history ==
According to the Danish Census Book of 1241, the western part of the modern Anija Parish was split between the Ancient-Estonian counties of Revala and Harju.

More specifically the northern parts of the modern parish were located in the ancient Jõelähtme parish of Revala county and included the villages of Aavere, Anija, Kõlu, Soodla, Kihmla, Pirsu, Kehra, and Parila. Kaersoo, which is also mentioned in the book, was divided between the modern villages of Sambu and Salumäe in 1977. It is speculated that some parts of the modern Linnakse were once a part of the relatively large ancient village of Saintakæ, which eventually became the modern Raasiku.

Also according to the book, the southern parts of the modern parish were located in the ancient Kose parish of Harju county and included the villages of Pikva, Rooküla, Kaivere, Alavere, Mõisaaseme, Rasivere, and Voose. Kiviloo, whose historic center is located in the modern village of Lükati, is also mentioned.

The south-eastern part of the parish has historically been a part of Ambla parish of Järva county, while the north-eastern part of the parish was a part of Kuusalu parish, both being sparsely populated. There have been several historic settlements on the lands of modern Pillapalu and Aegviidu, including Kosenõmme, Rekka, Kaikvõhma, Koolma, Koonukõrve, and Laudisalu, all of which were mentioned in 1379 as belonging to the Lehtse Manor. The historic Koitjärve, first mentioned in 1518, is located on the lands of modern Pillapalu.

== History ==
=== Russian Empire ===
Anija Parish was formed as a result of the Baltic Parish Law, signed by Alexander II of Russia on March 3, 1866 [O.S. February 19, 1866], and in force since October 13, 1866 [O.S. October 1, 1866]. The law was a part of reforms that were aimed at curbing the powers of local feudal lords, and paved the way towards Estonian independence in 1918. The parish was formed on the grounds of the Harju-Jaani Church Parish some time after the law came into force. Other parishes that incorporated parts of the modern Anija Parish in the Harju-Jaani Church Parish include Kehra-Kaunissaare, Paasiku, Kambi-Raasiku, Kiviloo, and Haljava.

Kaunissaare became a part of Kiviloo Parish in 1880, leaving behind Kehra Parish. Kehra, Haljava, and Paasiku Parishes became a part of Anija Parish on January 10, 1891 [O.S. January 22, 1891], while Kiviloo, Kambi-Raasiku, and Perila-Rätla Parishes became a part of Peningi Parish. The areas of the former Kambi-Raasiku, Paasiku, and Haljava Parishes became Raasiku Parish on June 8, 1898 [O.S. June 20, 1898].

Alavere-Pikva-Rooküla Parish was formed on the grounds of the Kose Church Parish in 1866, only to disintegrate into three separate parishes in 1870: Alavere, Pikva, and Rooküla. The three parishes became a part of Palvere Parish on May 7, 1891 [O.S. April 25, 1891]. Palvere Parish was renamed to Nikolai Parish on October 8, 1891 [O.S. October 27, 1891]. The areas of the former three parishes were separated from Nikolai Parish on July 15, 1899 [O.S. July 3, 1899] and became Alavere Parish.

Lehtse and Kärevete Parishes were formed on the grounds of the Ambla Church Parish in 1866. The areas east of Mustjõe train stop and south of Koitjärve bog were all part of Lehtse Parish, except the Nelijärve area in Aegviidu, which was a part of Kärevete Parish. Kärevete Parish was renamed to Ambla Parish in 1892.

Kolga Parish was formed on the grounds of the Kuusalu Church Parish in 1866. There are also records of a Koitjärve Parish that existed sometime between 1866 and 1879 and eventually became a part of Kolga Parish but it is unclear if it included any parts of the modern day Anija Parish. South of the Soodla River, the historic village of Kõrveveski and Kivijärv belonged to Kolga Parish, both of which are currently part of the village of Pillapalu.

=== Interwar period ===
==== 1910s ====
The areas around Kaunissaare manor were transferred from Peningi Parish to Alavere Parish on August 15, 1919. Additionally some forested areas were transferred from Raasiku Parish to Alavere Parish on the same day.

==== 1920s ====
The populated areas south of Koitjärve bog, around the village of Pillapalu, were transferred from Jõelehtme and Nehatu Parishes to Anija Parish on July 1, 1923, with the forested areas being transferred on January 1, 1925. Verioja area was also gradually transferred as part of the same agreements.

According to the 1922 Estonian census data, released in 1924, Anija Parish consisted of the villages of Aavere, Härmakosu (Härmakoosu), Kehra, Kõrve (Kärve), Loo (Kerbuküla), Oja, Otsa, Pillapalu, Pirga, Pirsu, Soodla, Vikipalu, Ülejõe, and of Anija, Kehra manors. Additionally, the 1923 list of Estonian settlements released by the Estonian postal authority also mentions the village of Pringu and Lilli, Mullikmäe settlements. The village of Kõrve was located where the Ruunoja River flows into the Soodla River, in the modern-day village of Raudoja. The villages of Otsa and Pirga were located just north and north-east of Lilli, respectively, and are today part of the village of Soodla. The village of Pirsu was located just west of Lilli, on both shores of the Jägala river, and is presently split between the villages of Lilli and Kuusemäe. The village of Oja was located on the shores of the Aavoja River, in the southern part of the modern village of Ülejõe. Mullikmäe was located north of Aavere, on the road that connects the village of Anija with the Piibe road, and is presently part of the village of Partsaare. The relatively unknown village of Pringu was home to the local municipal hall (vallamaja) and has usually been counted as a part of the village of Pirga.

According to the 1922 Estonian census data, the villaged of Alavere Parish consisted of Arava, Jõeääre, Kuusiku, Laksu, Palu, Pikva, Rasivere, Rooküla (Rookla), Soo-otsa (Sootsa), Taganurga, Uuearu, the settlements of Alavere, Rooküla, and of Kaunissaare, Nõmbra, Pikva manors. In addition, the 1923 list of Estonian settlements released by the Estonian postal authority also mentions Mõisaaseme settlement, Jõeääre, Pikaveski, and Vetla watermills on the Jägala river, and Pirgu watermill on the Jõelähtme river, near the border of Peningi parish. The village of Jõeääre was located directly east of Pikva, on the shores of the Jägala River, in the modern-day village of Arava, while the village of Laksu was located directly west of Pikva, near the modern Laksu main ditch, and is currently also part of Pikva. The village of Kuusiku was located just south-west of the modern day Kaunissaare reservoir. The village of Palu was located north of the village of Voose, and south of the Perila-Jäneda road in the modern village of Rasivere. The village of Soo-otsa was located just north-west of the village of Palu, along the Perila-Jäneda road in the modern village of Rasivere. The village of Mõisaaseme was located just south of the village of Soo-Otsa, and east of the original Rasivere, and is also part of Rasivere in modern times. Taganurga was located east of the Vetla watermill, on the eastern bank of the Jägala River. Nõmbra is nowadays part of Kose Parish.

According to the 1923 list of Estonian settlements released by the Estonian postal authority, the areas of Lehtse Parish that lied on the grounds of modern Anija Parish consisted of the villages of Aegviidu borough, Koolme, Pruuna-Kõrve, and of the historic settlement of Kosenõmme (Kasenõmme). Koonukõrve (Konukõrve) is listed as a farmstead and Mustjõe (Must) is listed as a train stop. The villages of Koolme and Pruuna-Kõrve were located northeast of the village of Jäneda, in the southeastern-most part of the modern-day village of Pillapalu. Nowadays, Kosenõmme makes up the northern part of Aegviidu borough. Koonukõrve was located east of Pillapalu and north of Jäneda, on the banks of the Soodla River, and on the grounds of the modern-day villages of Pillapalu and Koitjärve. The Nelijärve area belonged to Ambla Parish and was sparsely populated.

==== 1930s ====
As a result of the 1939 Estonian parish reform, effective since April 1, 1939, Anija Parish:

- gained the villages of Alavere, Arava, Jõeääre, Kuusiku, Pikva, Soo-otsa, Uuearu from Alavere Parish, splitting Alavere Parish between Anija, Ravila, and Peningi Parishes in the process
- gained the settlement and village of Paasiku from the villages of Raasiku Parish (modern Paasiku and Salumetsa, respectively)
- gained Soo-otsa farmstead and a forested area south of it from Peningi Parish (modern western part of the village of Lükati)
- lost the village of Aavere and the western parts of the settlement of Anija to Raasiku Parish
- lost the western part of Pillapalu settlement to Lehtse Parish

=== Soviet occupation ===
==== 1940s ====
On August 8, 1945, the following rural councils were established on the lands of the previous parishes:

- Anija Parish: Anija, Kehra, and Pikva Rural Councils
- Lehtse Parish: Aegviidu Rural Council
- Raasiku Parish: Läti, and Haljava Rural Councils
- Ravila Parish: Voose Rural Council

Kehra became a worker's borough on September 13, 1945. Aegviidu became a summering borough on December 29, 1945.

==== 1950s ====
Parishes existed in parallel to rural councils until September 26, 1950, when rural councils were split among the newly created regions:

- Harju Region: Haljava, and Läti Rural Councils
- Kose Region: Anija, Kehra, Pikva, and Voose Rural Councils
- Tapa Region: Aegviidu Rural Council

The number of rural councils in Estonia was reduced by half on June 17, 1954, leading to the following outcome:

- Aegviidu Rural Council: Aegviidu Rural Council
- Alavere Rural Council: Pikva, and Voose Rural Councils
- Anija Rural Council: Anija, and Kehra Rural Councils
- Raasiku Rural Council: Aruküla, Haljava, and Läti Rural Councils

Parts of Anija, Kolga, and Kõnnu Rural Councils became a part of Aegviidu Rural Council of Tapa Region on October 12, 1957. The border between Anija and Aegviidu Rural Councils ran from Mustjõe train station towards Koitjärve bog until hitting the Piibe road and then westwards along the road. Kehra Borough, along with Anija and Alavere Rural Councils became a part of Harju Region as Kose Region was split between Harju and Rapla Regions on January 24, 1959.

When the Estonian Central Polygon was established in 1952, many villages and farmsteads were forcefully left abandoned or destroyed in the area, including what is now eastern Anija Parish: Apuparra, Koitjärve, Kõrveveski, Kulli, Lepasilla, Pruunakõrve, parts of Pillapalu. The former villages and farmsteads lay mostly on the grounds of the modern-day village of Pillapalu.

==== 1960s ====
Tapa Region along with Aegviidu borough and rural council became a part of Paide Region on March 28, 1962. Aegviidu borough and rural council became a part of Harju Region on December 21, 1962. All of Aegviidu Rural Council and the part of Alavere Rural Council that was used by the Pikva kolkhoz became a part of Anija Rural Council on January 18, 1963. Western parts of the former Vohnja Rural Council of Rakvere Region became a part of Anija Rural Council of Harju Region on December 28, 1963, but ultimately were transferred to Kuusalu Rural Council instead on December 27, 1976. There were border changes between Kehra borough and Anija Rural Council on December 27, 1968.

==== 1970s ====
On December 27, 1976, the villages of Aavere, Kihmla, Linnakse, Parila, and Salumäe became a part of Anija Rural Council because they were a part of the Kehra sovkhoz, and the villages of Arava, Pikva, and the former Jõeääre became part of Kose Rural Council because they were a part of the Alavere sovkhoz. Additionally, most of the areas gained from Vohnja Rural Council in 1963 were transferred to Kuusalu Rural Council. Kehra and Aegviidu boroughs underwent border changes.

==== 1980s ====
On October 28, 1983, the villages of Alavere, Arava, Lükati, Pikva, Rasivere, Rooküla, Uuearu, Vetla, and Voose were transferred from Kose Rural Council to Anija Rural Council.

=== Modern period ===
After the soviet occupation of Estonia ended, Anija parish was re-established on January 16, 1992, in the borders of the preceding Anija Rural Council. The town of Kehra became a part of the parish on December 2, 2002 and the borough of Aegviidu on October 21, 2017.

== Nature ==
Around half of the area of the parish is forested, while bodies of water account for about 3% of the area. The parish is home to the reservoirs of Soodla, Raudoja, Aavoja, and Kaunissaare, which belong to the Tallinn water supply system. The Jägala River, along with its tributaries of Soodla, Aavoja, Mustjõgi, Jõelähtme, Jänijõgi, and Tarvasjõgi, flow through the parish.

The southeastern corner of the hilly Aegviidu is home to the popular Nelijärve Lakes, while many other lakes dot the landscape east of Aegviidu on the lands of the Põhja-Kõrvemaa Nature Reserve and the village of Jäneda, with Kivijärv, Venejärv, Ännijärv, and Aegviidu blue springs among them. The Kaunismaa area in the village of Kuusemäe, between Kehra and Anija, is home to a collection of small lakes. The village of Mustjõe is home to a large, flooded quarry, that operated between 1985 and 1992. The material extracted from the quarry was used for the construction of the second track of the Tallinn-Tapa railway.

The Põhja-Kõrvemaa, Soodla, Voose, and Aegviidu areas are notable for their naturally hilly landscape. There is also a fairly large artificial mound in the village of Ülejõe, made of the manufacturing leftovers of Kehra pulp and paper mill and general garbage.

== Demographics ==
As of 1 January 2026, the parish had 6,365 residents, of which 3,285 (51.6%) were women and 3,080 (48.4%) were men.

Population census
Settlement	2000	2011	2021
Aavere	21	12	13
Aegviidu	-	-	674
Alavere	432	339	347
Anija	125	117	92
Arava	50	48	38
Härmakosu	76	58	46
Kaunissaare	76	79	83
Kehra (town)	-	2889	2759
Kehra (village)	35	42	29
Kihmla	34	31	28
Kuusemäe	32	28	26
Lehtmetsa	801	719	707
Lilli	136	97	82
Linnakse	65	73	58
Looküla	59	43	46
Lükati	68	65	53
Mustjõe	16	28	30
Paasiku	40	33	38
Parila	56	51	76
Partsaare	18	24	17
Pikva	104	93	101
Pillapalu	109	82	93
Rasivere	59	40	45
Raudoja	40	62	59
Rooküla	77	93	75
Salumetsa	27	27	35
Salumäe	61	52	59
Soodla	74	87	77
Uuearu	47	47	38
Vetla	51	45	55
Vikipalu	53	61	101
Voose	79	64	67
Ülejõe	243	202	212
Unknown	0	0	3
Total	3164	5731	6262

As for religion, Anija Parish is predominantly secular, with 75.6% of the population identifying as religiously unaffiliated. Among those older than fifteen years residents who do associate themselves with a faith, 10.0% identify as Orthodox and 6.1% as Lutheran, while other Christian denominations make up 3.6% of the population. 4.7% of the population follows other religions or did not specify their religious affiliation.

As for religious organizations, the Aegviidu Aleksander congregation of the Estonian Evangelical Lutheran Church in Aegviidu borough, the Baptist Kehra congregation and one Baptist prayer house in the town of Kehra operate in the municipality.

== Politics ==
- Anija parish council chairmen since 2002
  Name	In office
  Jaanus Kalev	18.10.2019 - ...
  Toomas Tõnise	21.03.2019 - 17.10.2019
  Jaan Oruaas	24.10.2017 - 13.02.2019
  Jaanus Kalev	31.10.2013 - 23.10.2017
  Jaan Oruaas	29.10.2009 - 30.10.2013
  Jaanus Kalev	Autumn? 2005 - 28.10.2009
  Tõnis Väli	Dec. 2002 - Autumn? 2005
- Mayors of Anija parish since 2002
  Name	In office
  Riivo Noor	21.03.2019 - ...
  Arvi Karotam	19.12.2013 - 15.03.2019
  Tiit Tammaru	06.11.2009 - 31.12.2013
  Jüri Lillsoo	Autumn 2005 - 09.11.2009
  Tiit Tammaru	Spring 2004 - Autumn 2005
  Olav Eensalu	Dec. 2002 - 18.03.2004
  Ilsia Väli	before 2002
  Tõnis Väli	before 2002

== Infrastructure ==
=== Transportation ===
The Tallinn-Narva railway passes through the parish and is serviced by Elron. Long-distance trains stop in Kehra, Aegviidu, and Nelijärve, while local Tallinn-Aegviidu trains stop in Parila, Kehra, Lahinguvälja, Mustjõe, and Aegviidu. It takes about 19 minutes to reach Kehra on a long-distance train from Ülemiste, and 31 minutes to reach Aegviidu. Meanwhile, local Tallinn-Aegviidu trains take about 10 more minutes due to additional stops.

Kose-Jägala, Jägala-Käravete (part of the bigger Piibe road), and Perila-Jäneda roads pass through the parish. Kehra, the administrative center, is located approximately 32.8 kilometers from the outer edge of Tallinn through Kose-Jägala, Jägala-Käravete, and Tallinn-Narva highways. The journey takes approximately 23 minutes.

The parish has a considerable, still-developing network of light traffic roads. Currently existing sections include Kõrvemaa-Aegviidu-Jäneda in the Aegviidu area and several shorter roads in the town of Kehra, with Kehra-Kaunisaare also reaching outside the town. Kehra-Anija and Soodla-Kõrvemaa sections are scheduled to be built in 2023, nearly connecting Kehra and Aegviidu. In approximate chronological order, other sections scheduled to be built include: Kehra-Vikipalu, Kehra-Lilli-Soodla, Kaunissaare-Pikva-Alavere, Anija-Raasiku, Vetla, Voose-Vetla-Kreo, Vikipalu-Lahinguvälja, Alavere-Rooküla-Lükati.

As of 2020, five bus lines were providing local transport in Anija Parish, three of which operate on every workday. There is also a bus line between Kehra and Kose borough.

=== Tallinn water supply system ===
The parish is home to the reservoirs of Soodla, Raudoja, Aavoja, and Kaunissaare, which belong to the Tallinn water supply system. All of the reservoirs are located on a river that shares the name of the reservoir, except Kaunissaare, which is located on the Jägala River. Soodla reservoir feeds into Raudoja reservoir through a pipe, Raudoja feeds into Aavoja through a canal, Aavoja feeds into Kaunissaare through a canal, and Kaunissaare feeds into Vaskjala reservoir through the Kaunissaare-Patika canal and a small section of the Pirita River. Each canal has a gravel road next to it for maintenance.

== Culture ==
The 1903 novel by Eduard Vilde "Kui Anija mehed Tallinnas käisid" (English: When Anija men visited Tallinn) describes the life of 19th century Tallinn, from the perspective of a peasant, including a section about peasants from the lands of the historic Anija Manor getting beaten up by feudal lords in Tallinn.

In 1922, A. H. Tammsaare wrote his novel "Kõrboja Peremees" in the Kaserahu Manor, ruins of which currently lay next to the Kose-Jägala road, a kilometer south of the current Kaunissaare Reservoir by road. The setting of the novel is inspired by the historic Koitjärve area, which is also reflected in the 1979 film adaption of the same name, directed by Leida Laius, filmed in the Paukjärve area, on the eastern border of current Anija Parish.

== Notable people ==
- Jaan Lepp (1895 in Anija – 1941), a track and field athlete, and military lieutenant colonel.
- Alfred Tooming (1907 in Ülejõe – 1977), prelate, the Archbishop of Tallinn and Primate of the Estonian Evangelical Lutheran Church, between 1967 and 1977.
- Jan Kaus (born 1971 in Aegviidu), writer, he works as poet and prose writer and publicist.
- Sandra Nurmsalu (born 1988 in Alavere), singer, songwriter and violinist; was also the lead singer of Urban Symphony, 2007–2010

== Gallery ==
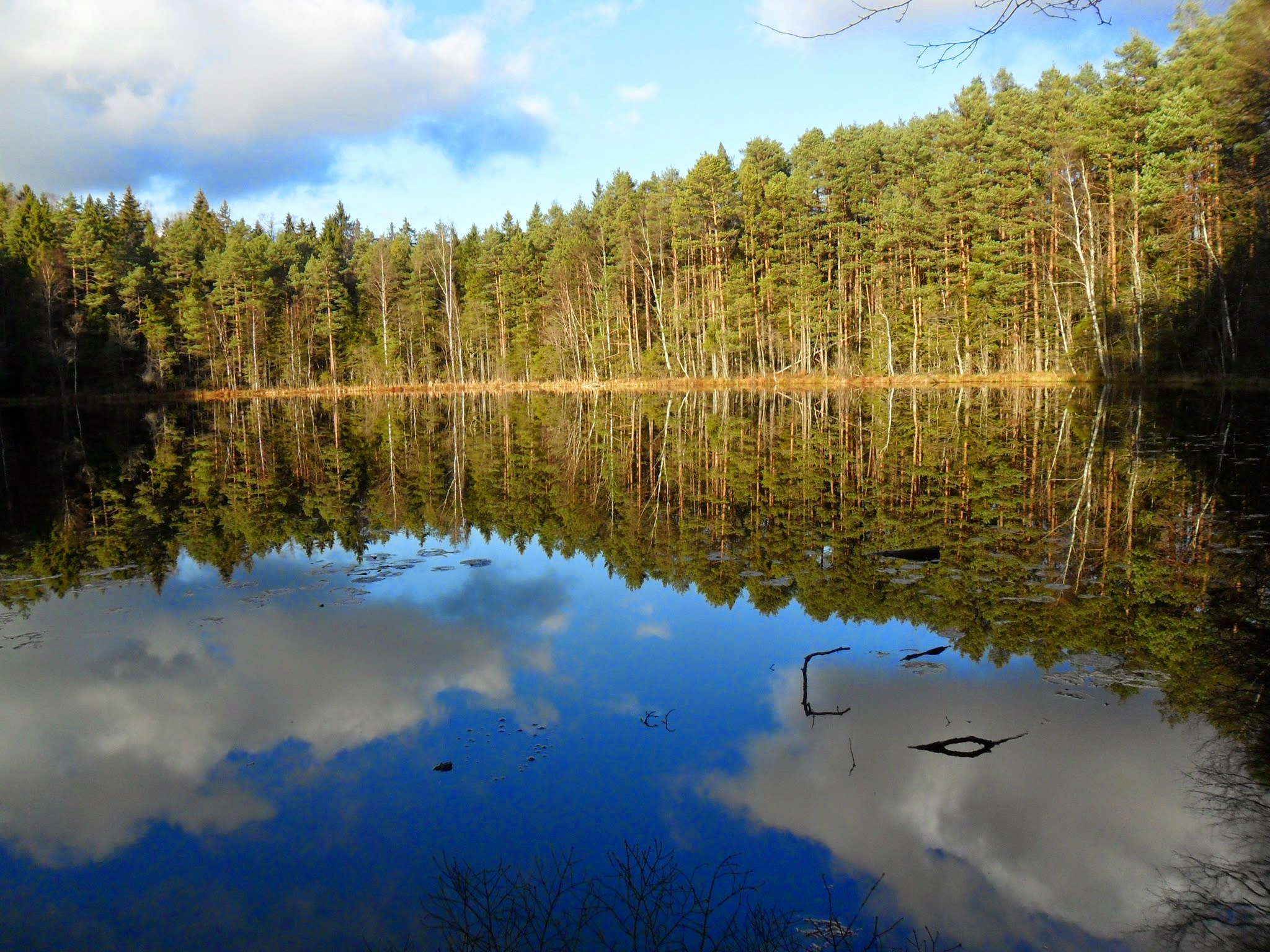
Väike Kalajärv, a lake in Kõrvemaa Nature Park

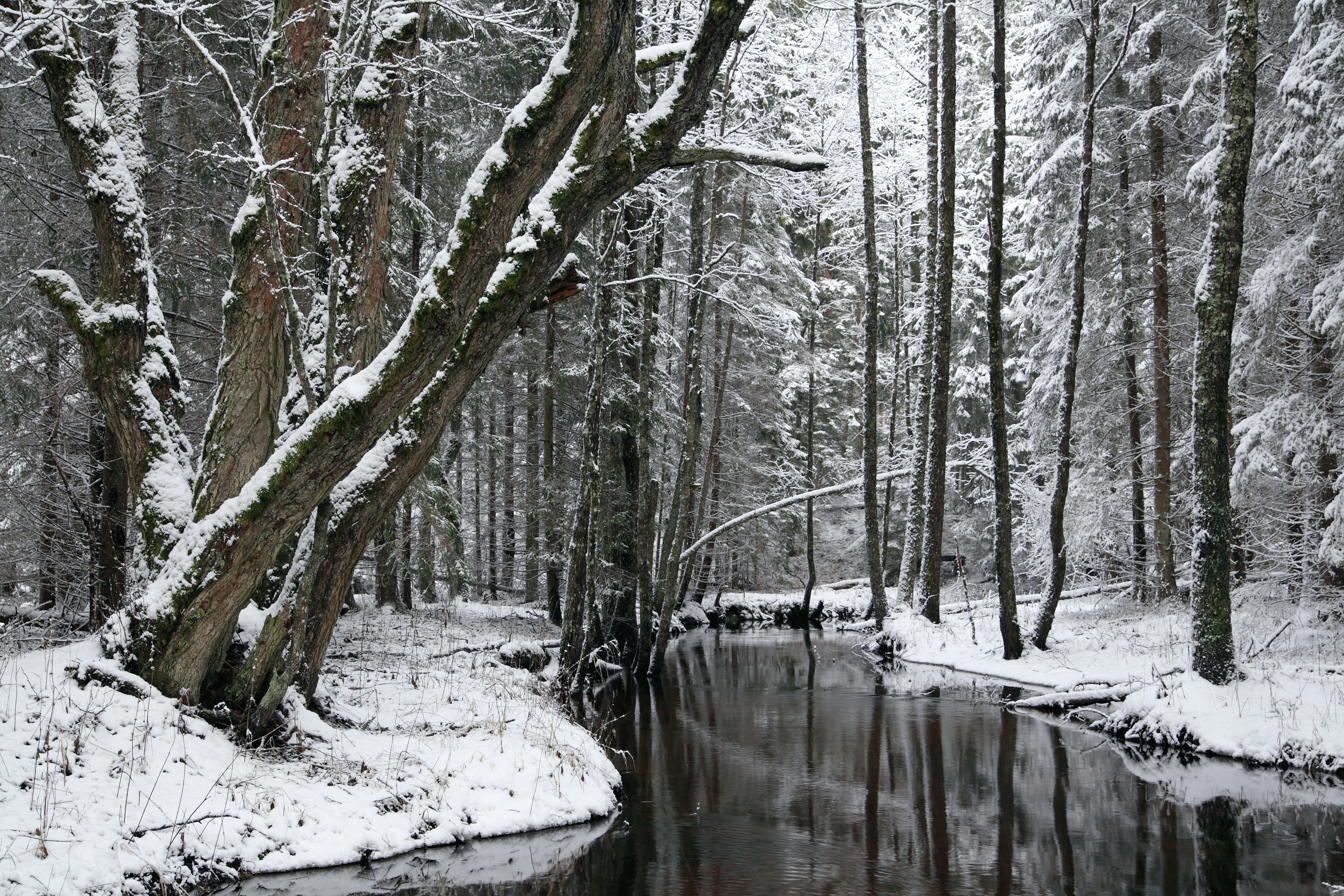
Tarvasjõgi river in Kõrvemaa Nature Park

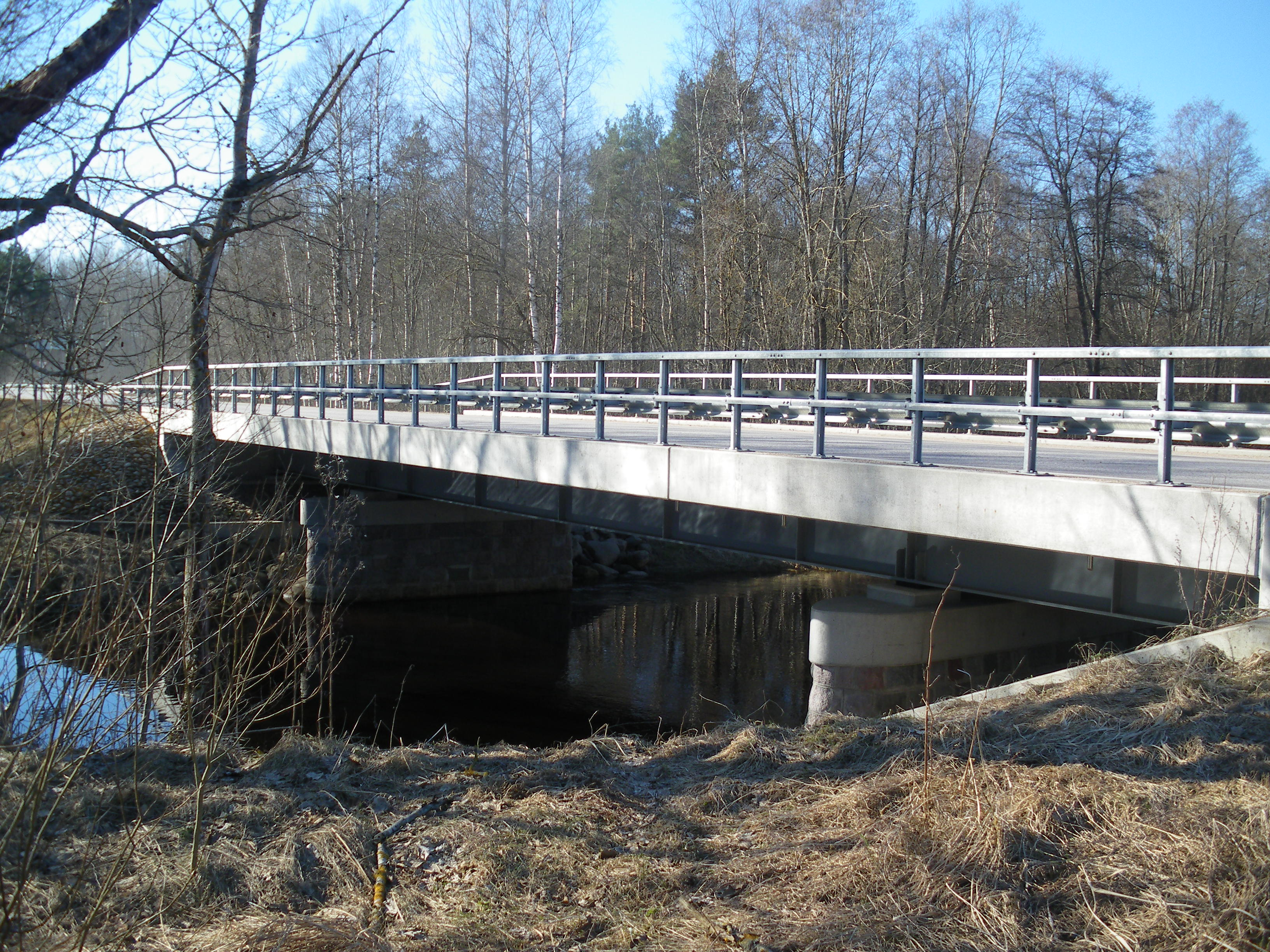
Soodla bridge

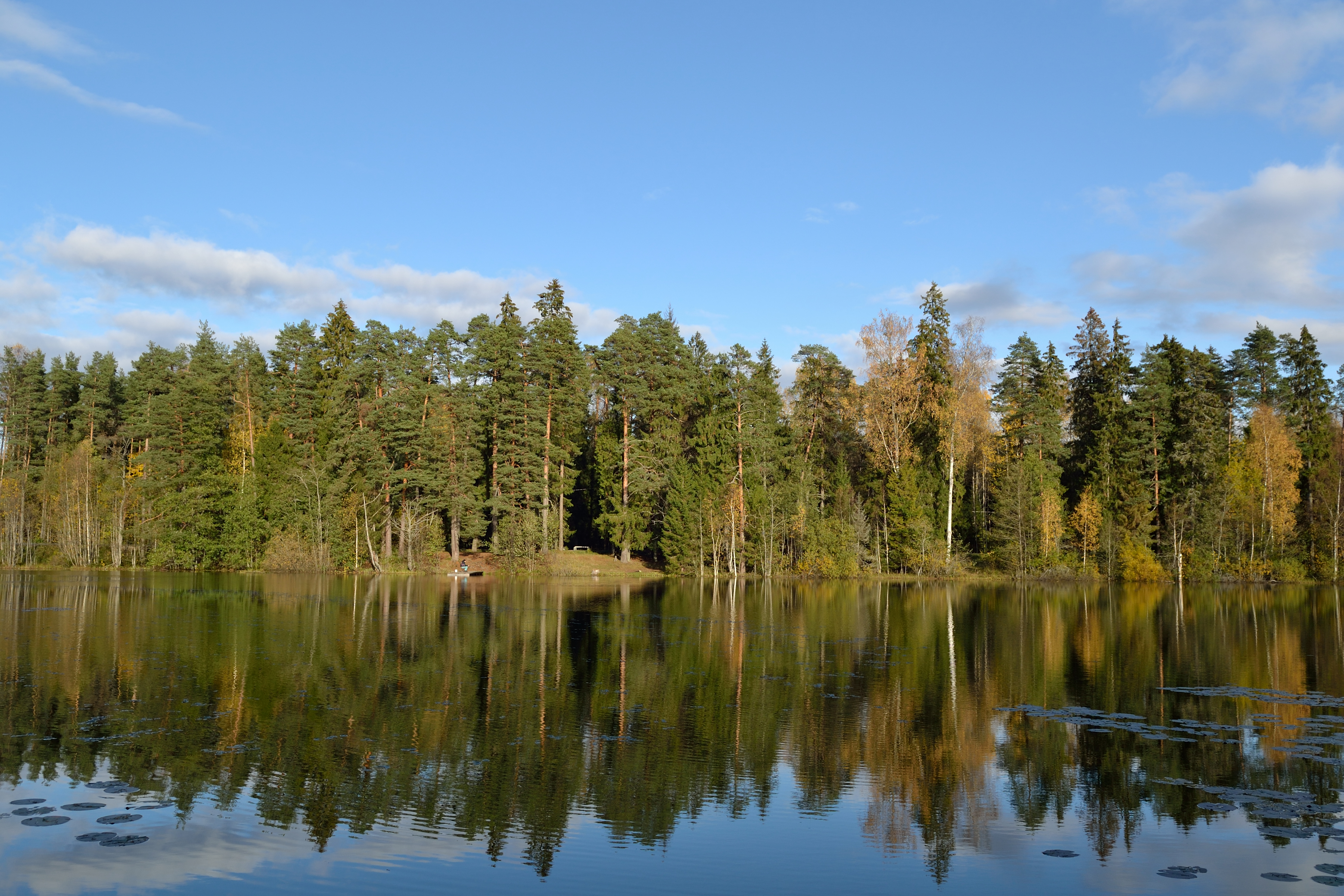
Lake Vahejärv

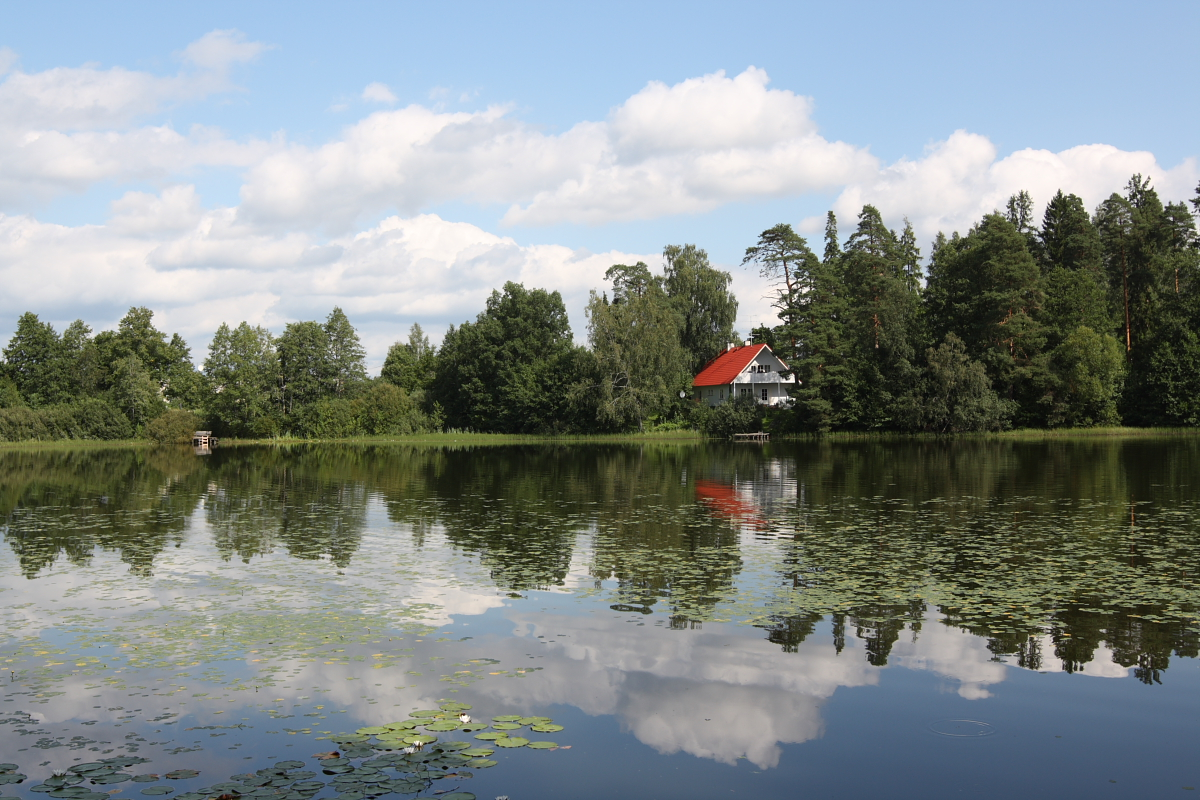
Lake Nikerjärv

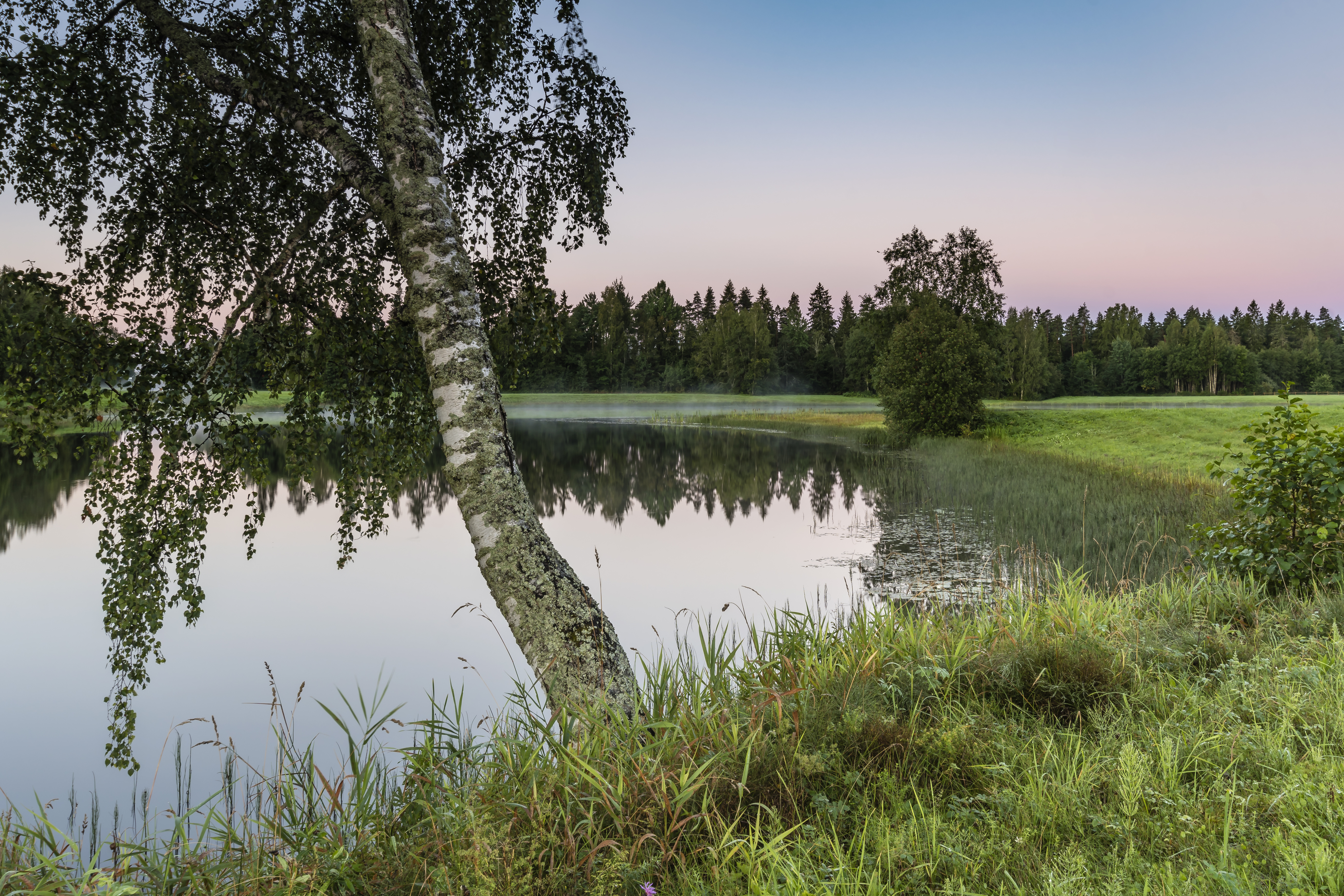
Raudoja reservoir
