= Ülejõe, Anija Parish =

Village in Harju County, Estonia

Ülejõe
- Village
- Location in Estonia
- Coordinates: 59°20′39″N 25°20′54″E
- Country: Estonia
- County: Harju County
- Municipality: Anija Parish

Area
  - Total: 6.5 km^{2} (2.5 sq mi)
- Highest elevation: 69.6 m (228 ft)
- Lowest elevation: 40 m (130 ft)

Population (2020)
  - Total: 243
  - Density: 37/km^{2} (97/sq mi)

Ethnicity (2011)
  - estonians: 77.2%
  - other: 22.8%
- Time zone: UTC+2 (EET)
  - Summer (DST): UTC+3 (EEST)
- Postal Codes: 74316

Ülejõe is a village in Anija Parish, Harju County, Estonia, just northeast of the town of Kehra.

The village is located on the right bank of the Jägala River. The Aavoja River flows into the Jägala River in the village. The Aavoja Reservoir is located in the southeastern part of the village, and the Kehra pulp mill's landfill is located in the central part of the village. As of August 1, 2020, the village had a population of 243.
