= Jõelähtme (river) =

River in Estonia

Jõelähtme River Raasiku jõgi, Jõelehtme jõgi
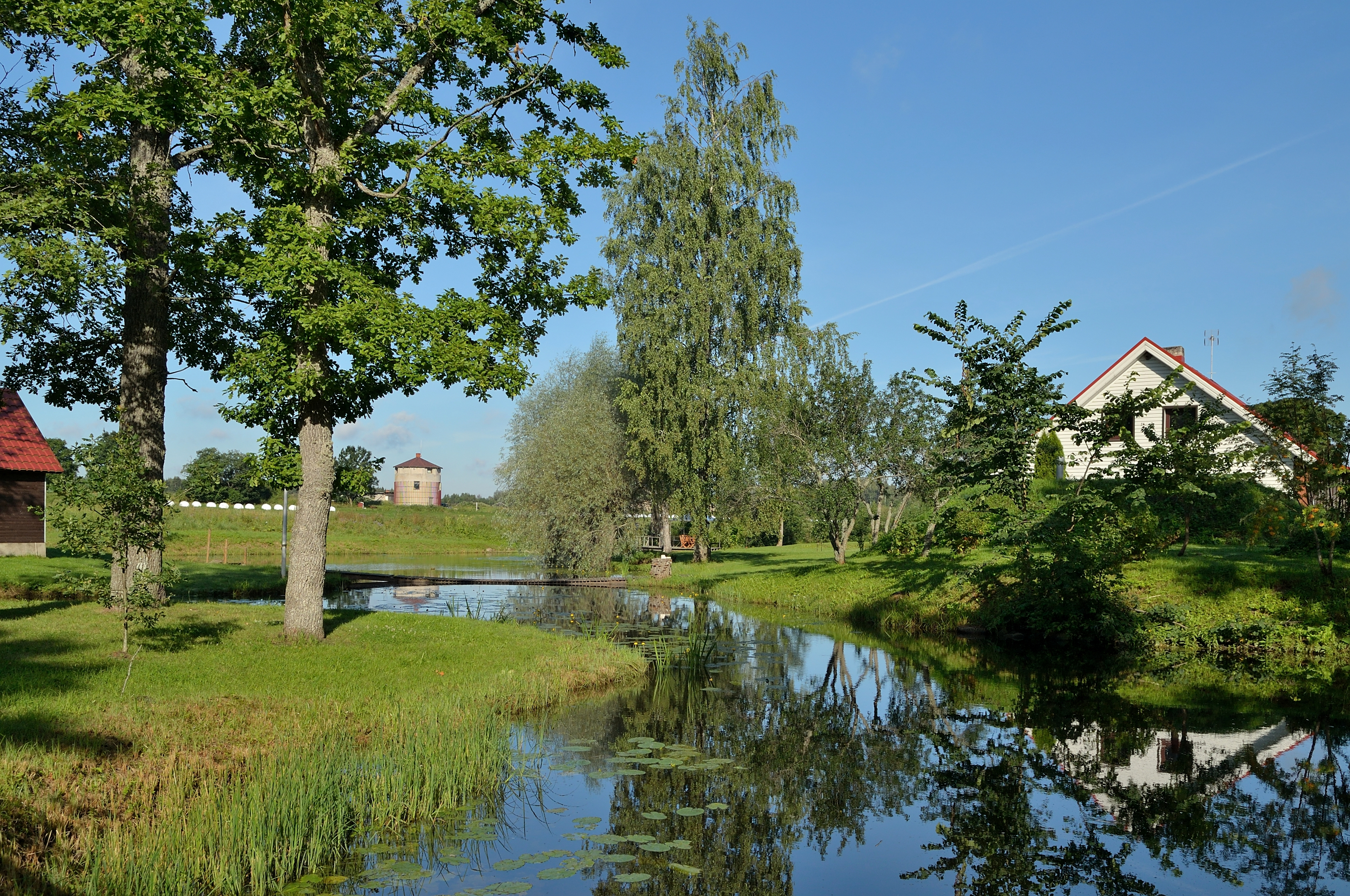
- The Jõelähtme River at Kiviloo
- Native name: Jõelähtme jõgi (Estonian)

Physical characteristics
- Source
  - location: Rasivere (Anija Parish)
  - coordinates: 59.19984497827661°N 25.33646285533905°E
- Mouth
  - location: Jõelähtme Parish, flows into Jägala River
  - coordinates: 59.450277962843735°N 25.173819065093994°E
- Length: 49.2 km (30.6 mi)

The Jõelähtme River (Estonian: Raasiku jõgi or Jõelehtme jõgi) is an Estonian river in Harju County. The river starts in Rasivere (Anija Parish) and discharges into the Jägala River in Jõelähtme Parish, only 100 m (330 ft) after Jägala Falls. The length of the river is 49.2 km.

The Jõelähtme River is one of the most significant subterranean rivers in Estonia; it flows underground through the Kostivere karst area for 2.5 km.
