= Piiroja =

Piiroja may refer to:

- Raio Piiroja (born 1979), ab Estonian football player
- alternative name of Matsuri, Estonia, a village in Värska Parish, Põlva County
- alternative name of Paasiku, a village in Anija Parish, Harju County, Estonia
