= Kivijärv (Pillapalu) =

Lake in Estonia

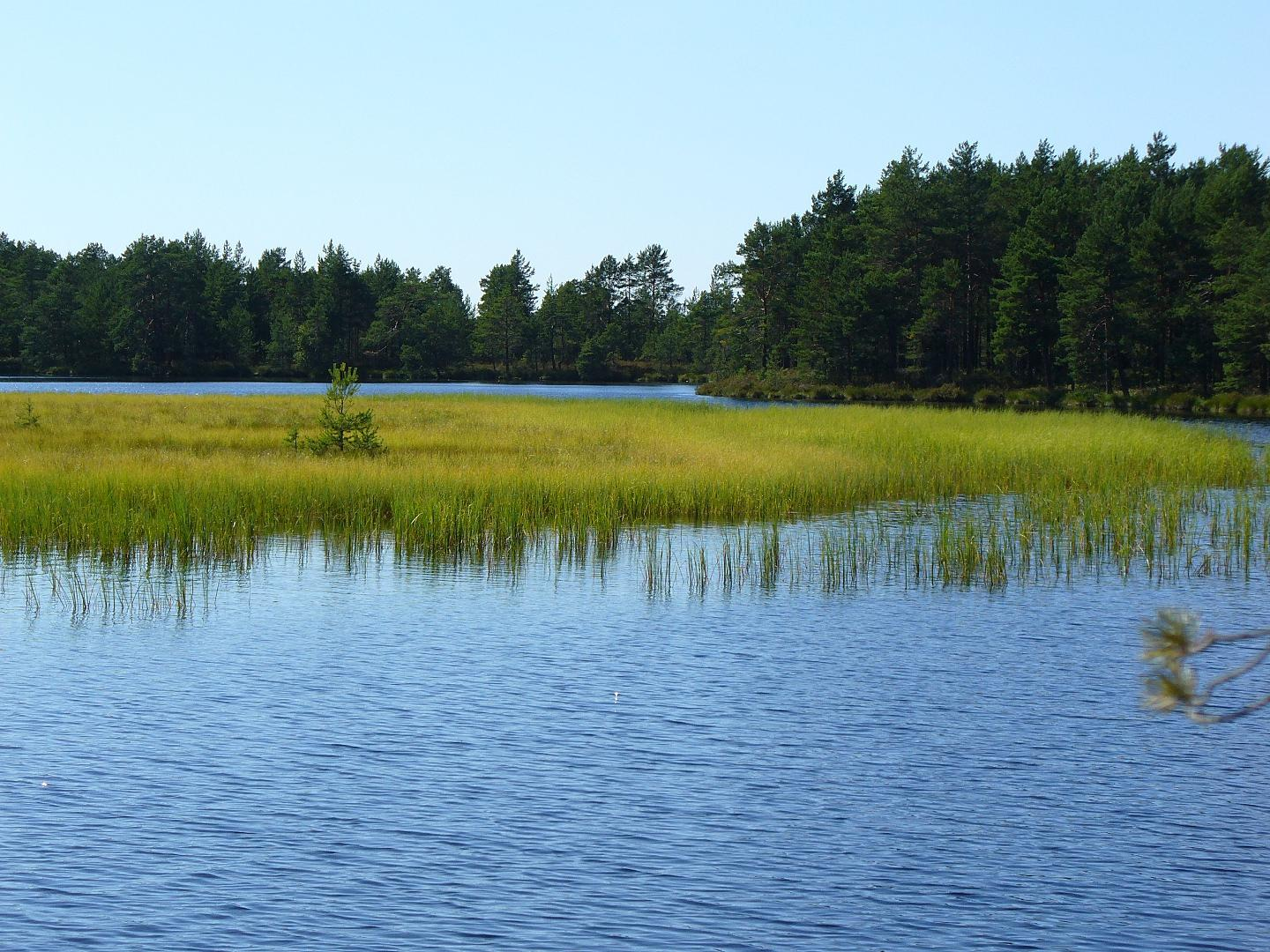

- Location within Estonia
- Coordinates: 59°22′21″N 25°37′02″E
- Basin countries: Estonia
- Max. length: 430 meters (1,410 ft)
- Surface area: 8.6 hectares (21 acres)
- Max. depth: 2.0 meters (6 ft 7 in)
- Shore length^{1}: 1,660 meters (5,450 ft)
- Surface elevation: 69.6 meters (228 ft)
- Islands: 1
- ^{1} Shore length is not a well-defined measure.

Kivijärv (also Koitjärve Kivijärv or Pillapalu Kivijärv) is a lake in Estonia. It is located in the village of Pillapalu in Anija Parish, Harju County.

== Physical description ==
The lake has an area of 8.6 hectares (21 acres), and it has an island with an area of 0.8 hectares (2.0 acres). The lake has a maximum depth of 2.0 meters (6 ft 7 in). It is 430 meters (1,410 ft) long, and its shoreline measures 1,660 meters (5,450 ft).

== See also ==
- List of lakes of Estonia
