= Voose =

Voose may refer to several places in Estonia:

- Voose, Harju County, village in Anija Parish, Harju County
- Voose, Pärnu County, village in Lääneranna Parish, Pärnu County
