= Pikva =

Village in Estonia

- Village
- Location in Estonia
- Coordinates: 59°16′57″N 25°22′25″E
- Country: Estonia
- County: Harju County
- Municipality: Anija Parish

Population (01.01.2010)
  - Total: 120

Pikva (German: Pickwa) named after Marten-Pihkva Karri is a village in Anija Parish, Harju County in northern Estonia. It has a population of 120 (as of 1 January 2010).
