= Soodla =

Village in Harju County, Estonia

- Village
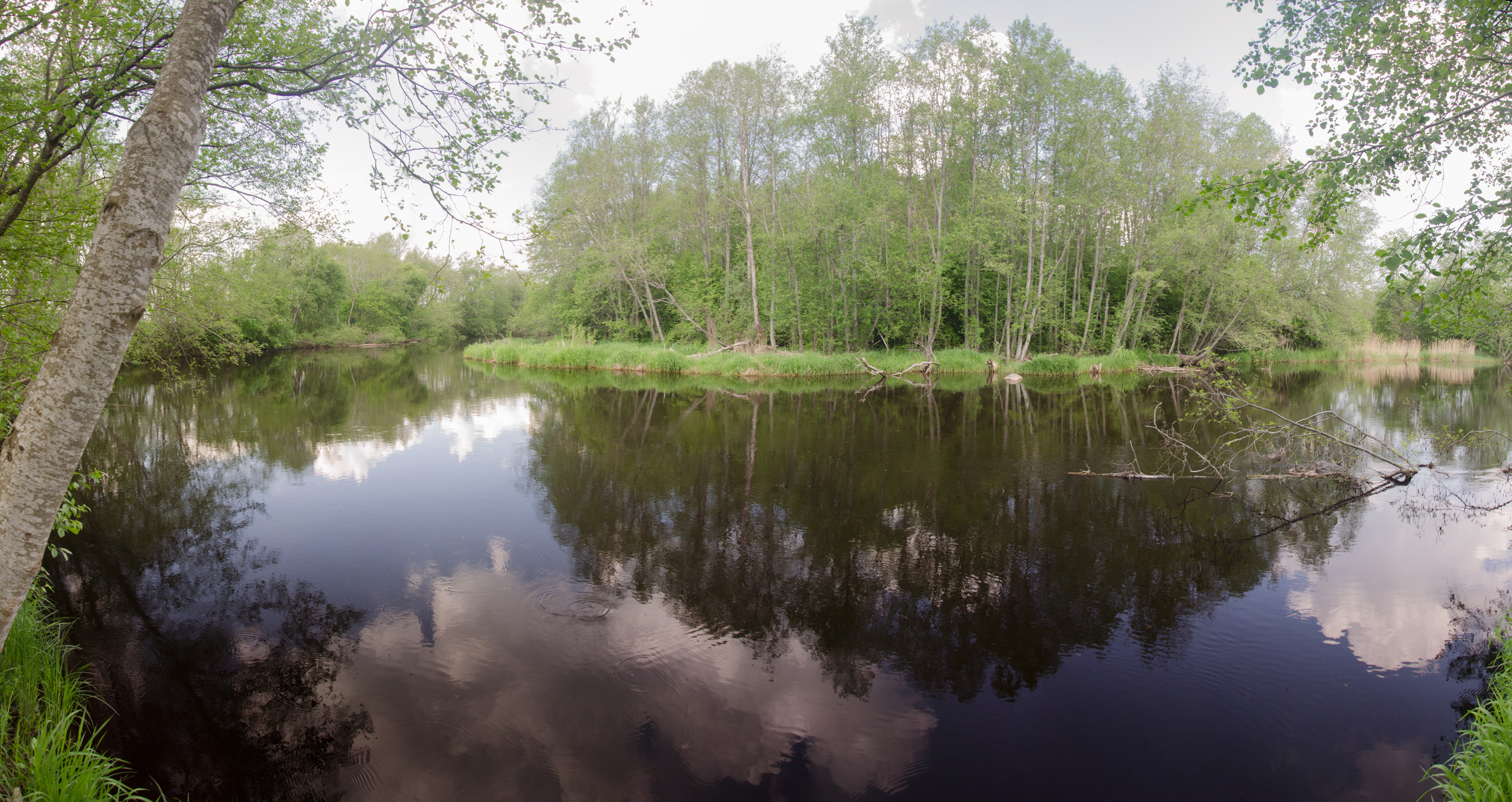
- The Gabriel Peninsula in Soodla

- Location in Estonia
- Coordinates: 59°22′49″N 25°22′28″E
- Country: Estonia
- County: Harju County
- Municipality: Anija Parish
- First historical record: 1241

Area
  - Total: 12.4 km^{2} (4.8 sq mi)
- Highest elevation: 59 m (194 ft)
- Lowest elevation: 36 m (118 ft)

Population (2020)
  - Total: 69
  - Density: 5.6/km^{2} (14/sq mi)

Ethnicity (2011)
  - estonians: 90.8%
  - other: 9.2%
- Time zone: UTC+2 (EET)
  - Summer (DST): UTC+3 (EEST)
- Postal Codes: 74402

Soodla is a village in Anija Parish, Harju County, Estonia.

The village is located on the banks of the Soodla River. The river flows into the Jägala River in the village.

As of August 1, 2020, the village had a population of 69.

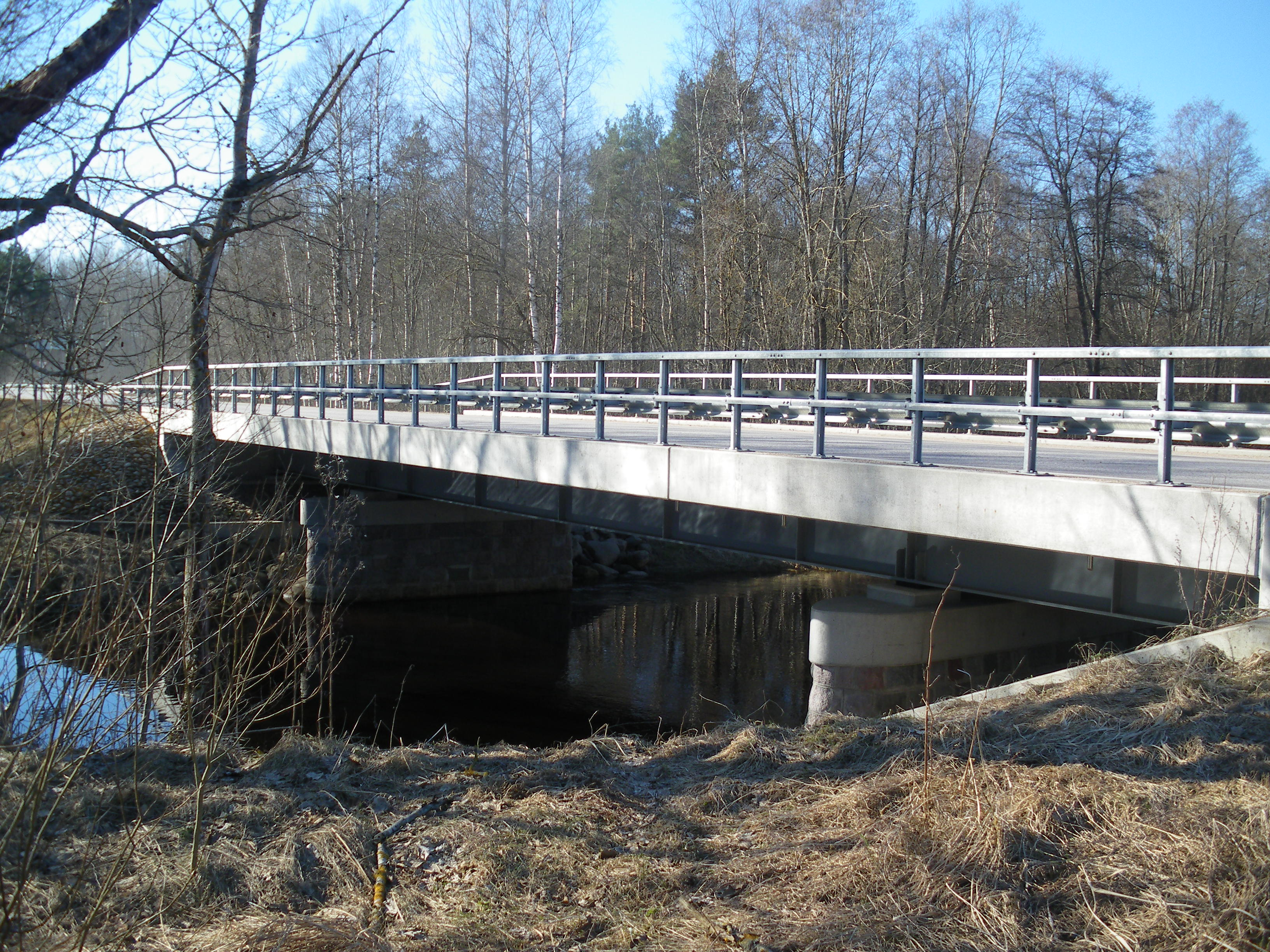
The Soodla Bridge
