= Kuusemäe =

Village in Estonia

- Village
- Location in Estonia
- Coordinates: 59°22′27″N 25°18′50″E
- Country: Estonia
- County: Harju County
- Municipality: Anija Parish

Population (01.01.2010)
  - Total: 17

Kuusemäe is a village in Anija Parish, Harju County in northern Estonia. It is located about 3.5 km (2 mi) north of the town of Kehra, on the left bank of the Jägala River. Kuusemäe has a population of 17 (as of 1 January 2010).
