= Lehtmetsa, Harju County =

Village in Estonia

Lehtmetsa
- Village
- Location in Estonia
- Coordinates: 59°19′25″N 25°20′49″E
- Country: Estonia
- County: Harju County
- Municipality: Anija Parish

Area
  - Total: 1 km^{2} (0.39 sq mi)
- Highest elevation: 53.5 m (176 ft)
- Lowest elevation: 44.5 m (146 ft)

Population (2020)
  - Total: 626
  - Density: 630/km^{2} (1,600/sq mi)

Ethnicity (2011)
  - estonians: 79.4%
  - other: 20.6%
- Time zone: UTC+2 (EET)
  - Summer (DST): UTC+3 (EEST)
- Postal Codes: 74310

Lehtmetsa is a village in Anija Parish, Harju County, Estonia, just south of the town of Kehra.

The village is situated on the left bank of the Jägala river.

As of August 1, 2020, the village had a population of 626.

== History ==
The apartment buildings in the village were built between 1972-1988.

The local sovkhoz opened kindergarten Lepatriinu on March 1, 1980. It is currently operated by Anija parish.

Social care home Kehra Kodu was opened in 2012.
