= Paukjärv =

Lake in Estonia

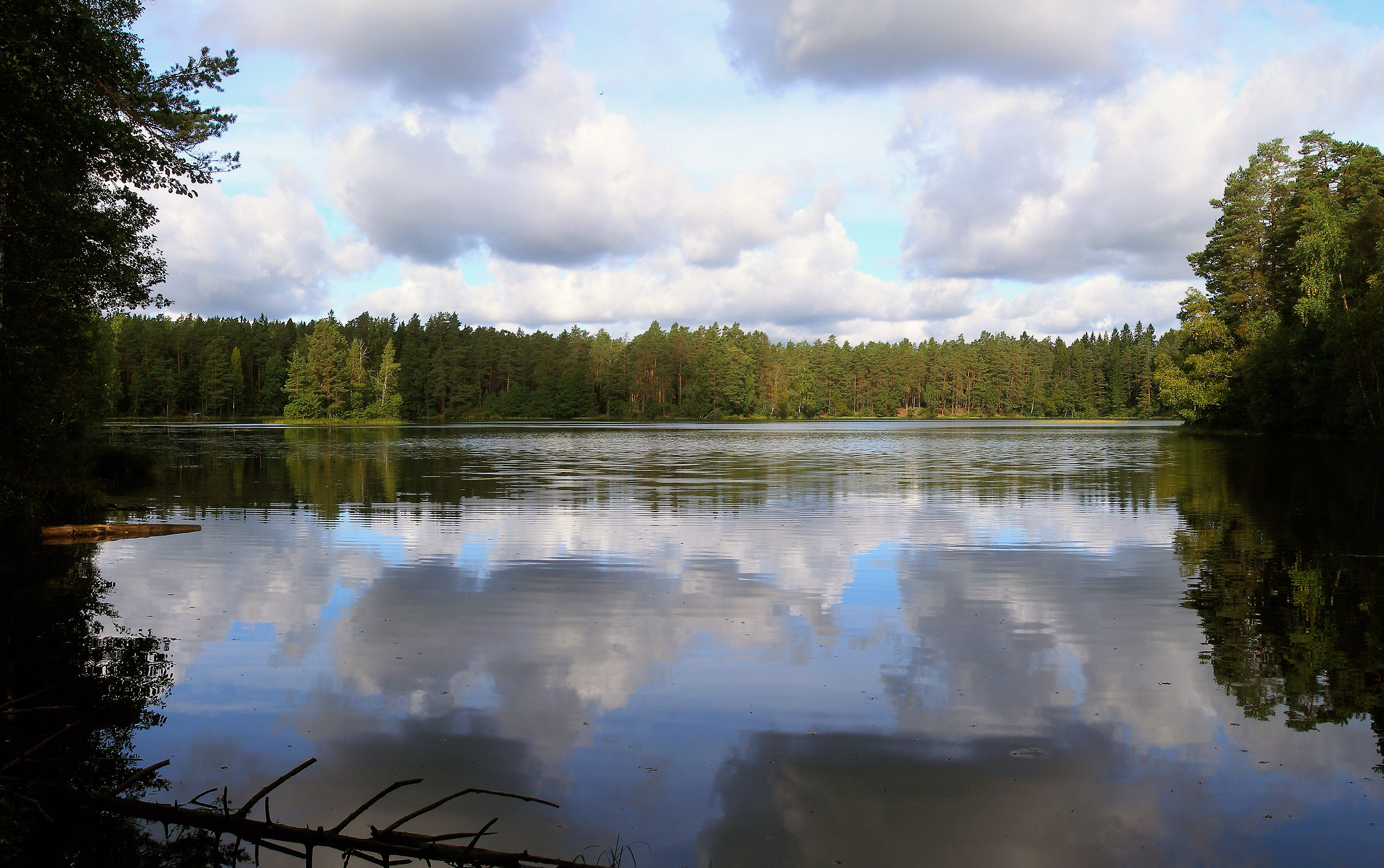

- Location within Estonia
- Coordinates: 59°24′N 25°41′E
- Basin countries: Estonia
- Max. length: 460 meters (1,510 ft)
- Surface area: 8.7 hectares (21 acres)
- Max. depth: 10.3 meters (34 ft)
- Shore length^{1}: 1,550 meters (5,090 ft)
- Surface elevation: 71.2 meters (234 ft)
- Islands: 1
- ^{1} Shore length is not a well-defined measure.

Paukjärv is a lake in Estonia. It is located in a forest in the village of Koitjärve in Kuusalu Parish, Harju County, 70 kilometres (43 mi) from Tallinn.

== Physical description ==
The lake has an area of 8.7 hectares (21 acres), and it has an island with an area of 0.02 hectares (0.049 acres). The lake has a maximum depth of 10.3 meters (34 ft). It is 460 meters (1,510 ft) long, and its shoreline measures 1,550 meters (5,090 ft).

== See also ==
- List of lakes of Estonia
