= Arava, Estonia =

Village in Estonia

Arava
- Village
- Location in Estonia
- Coordinates: 59°15′20″N 25°24′07″E
- Country: Estonia
- County: Harju County
- Municipality: Anija Parish

Population (01.01.2010)
  - Total: 40

Arava (German: Hafersdorf) is a village in Anija Parish, Harju County in northern Estonia. It had a population of 40 (as of 1 January 2010).
