= Salumäe =

Village in Estonia

- Village
- Location in Estonia
- Coordinates: 59°22′02″N 25°12′08″E
- Country: Estonia
- County: Harju County
- Municipality: Anija Parish

Population (01.01.2010)
  - Total: 67

Salumäe is a village in Anija Parish, Harju County in northern Estonia. It has a population of 67 (as of 1 January 2010).
