= Rooküla =

Village in Estonia

- Village
- Location in Estonia
- Coordinates: 59°15′47″N 25°18′25″E
- Country: Estonia
- County: Harju County
- Municipality: Anija Parish

Population (01.01.2010)
  - Total: 97

Rooküla (German: Rohküll) is a village in Anija Parish, Harju County in northern Estonia. It has a population of 97 (as of 1 January 2010).
