= Vetla =

Village in Estonia

- Village
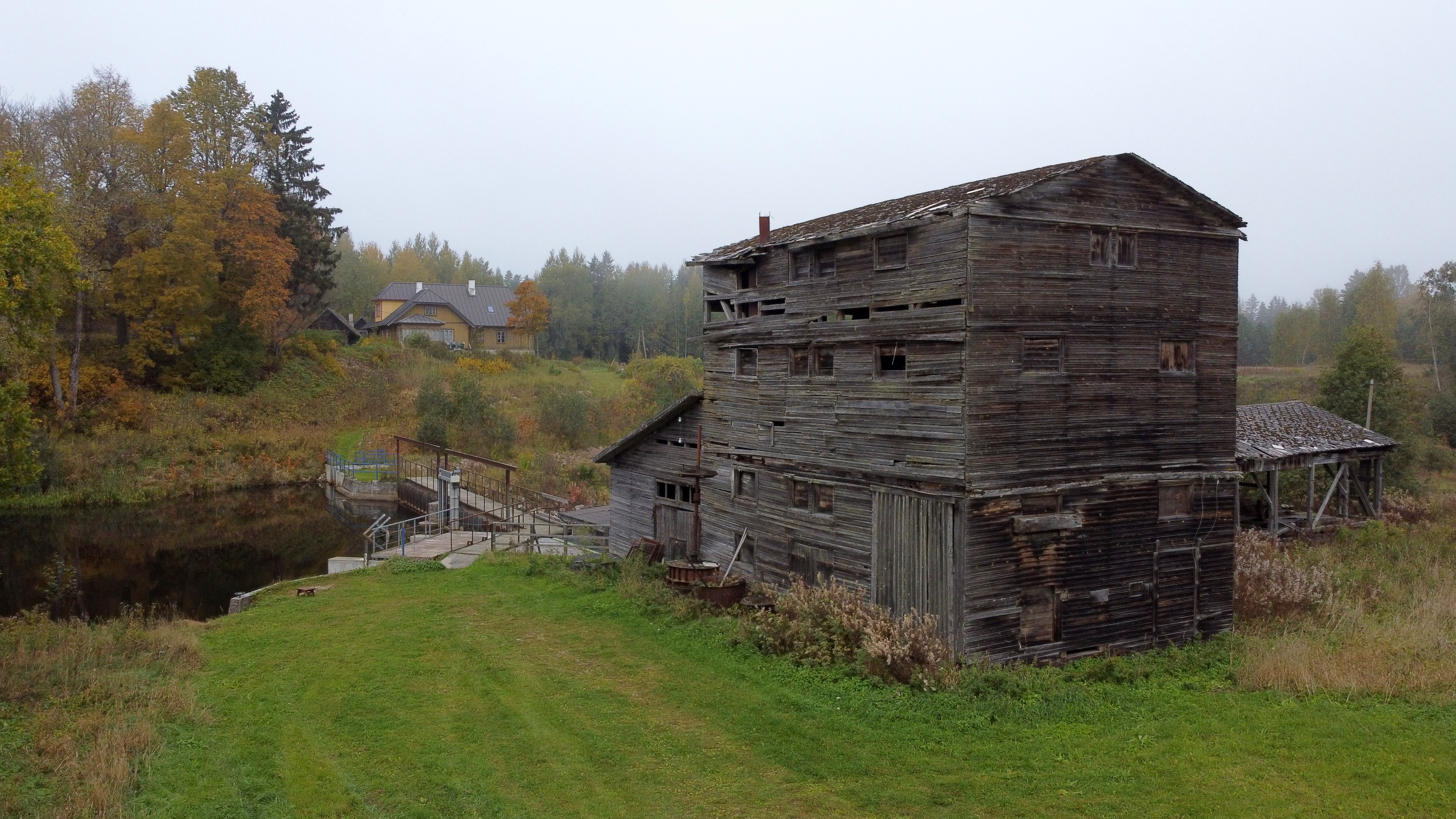

- Location in Estonia
- Coordinates: 59°13′07″N 25°27′20″E
- Country: Estonia
- County: Harju County
- Municipality: Anija Parish

Population (01.01.2010)
  - Total: 47

Drone video of foggy Vetla village in September 2021

Vetla is a village in Anija Parish, Harju County in northern Estonia. It has a population of 47 (as of 1 January 2010).

== Gallery ==
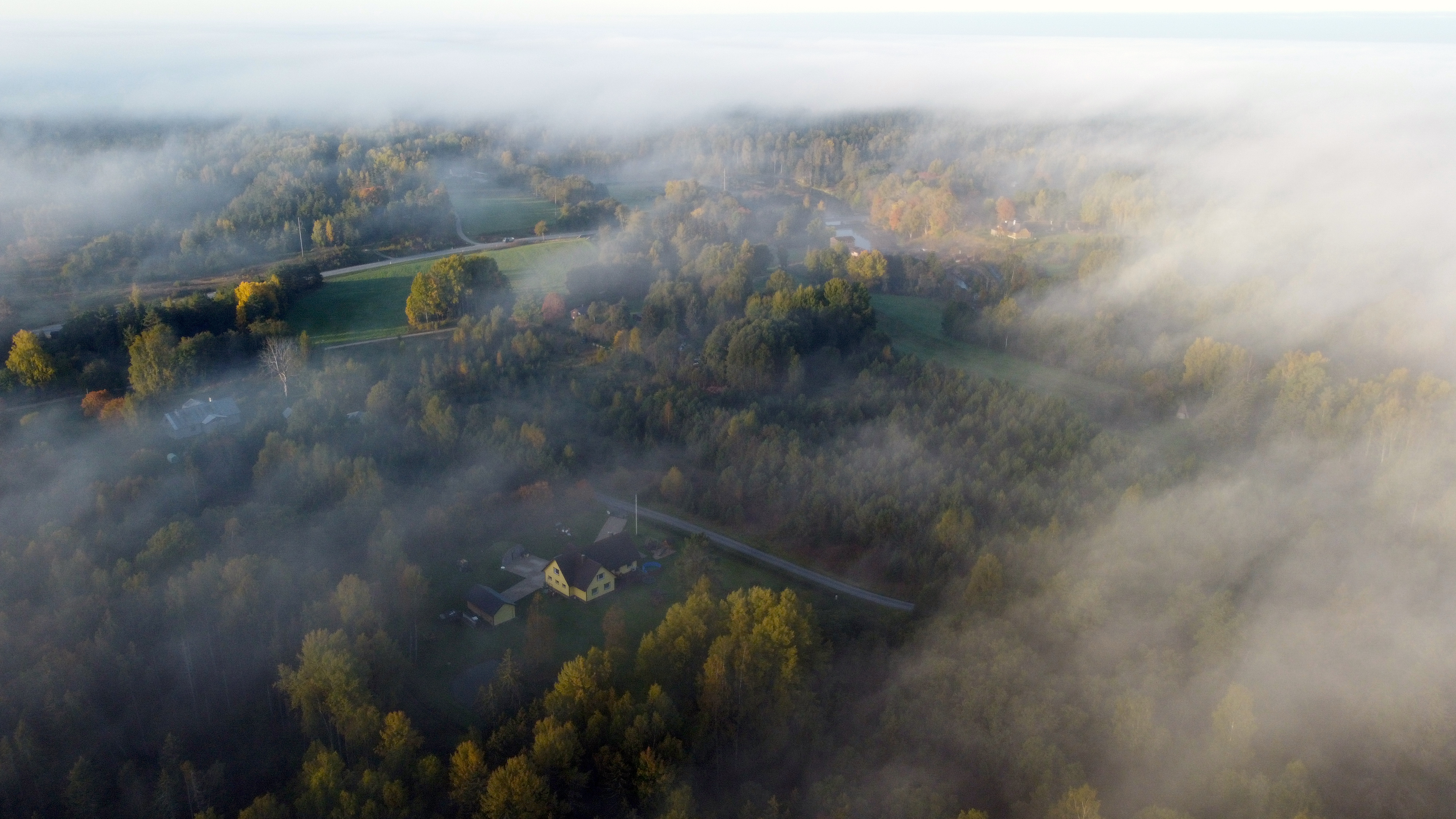
Vetla village in fog

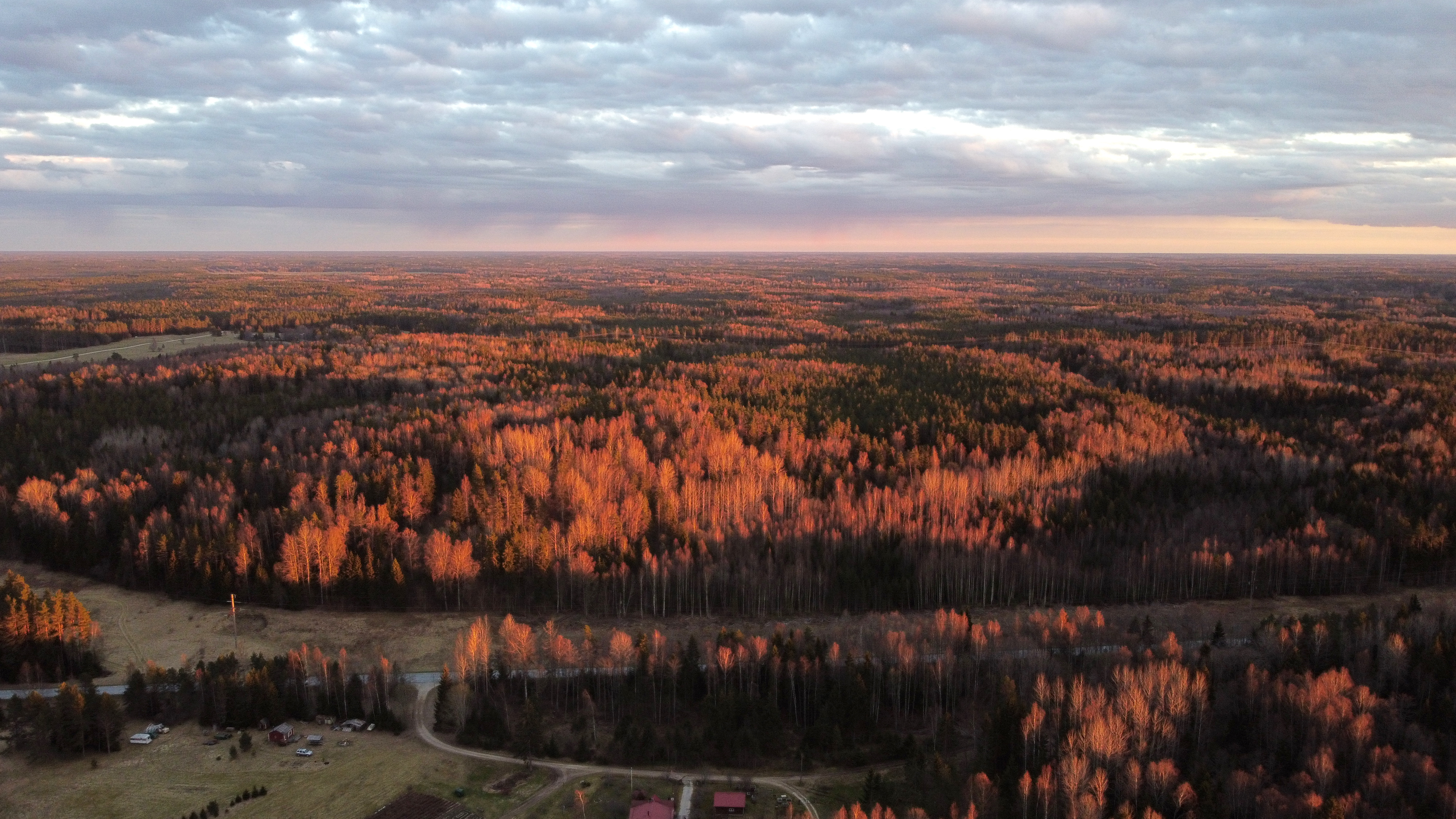
Nature reserve in Vetla

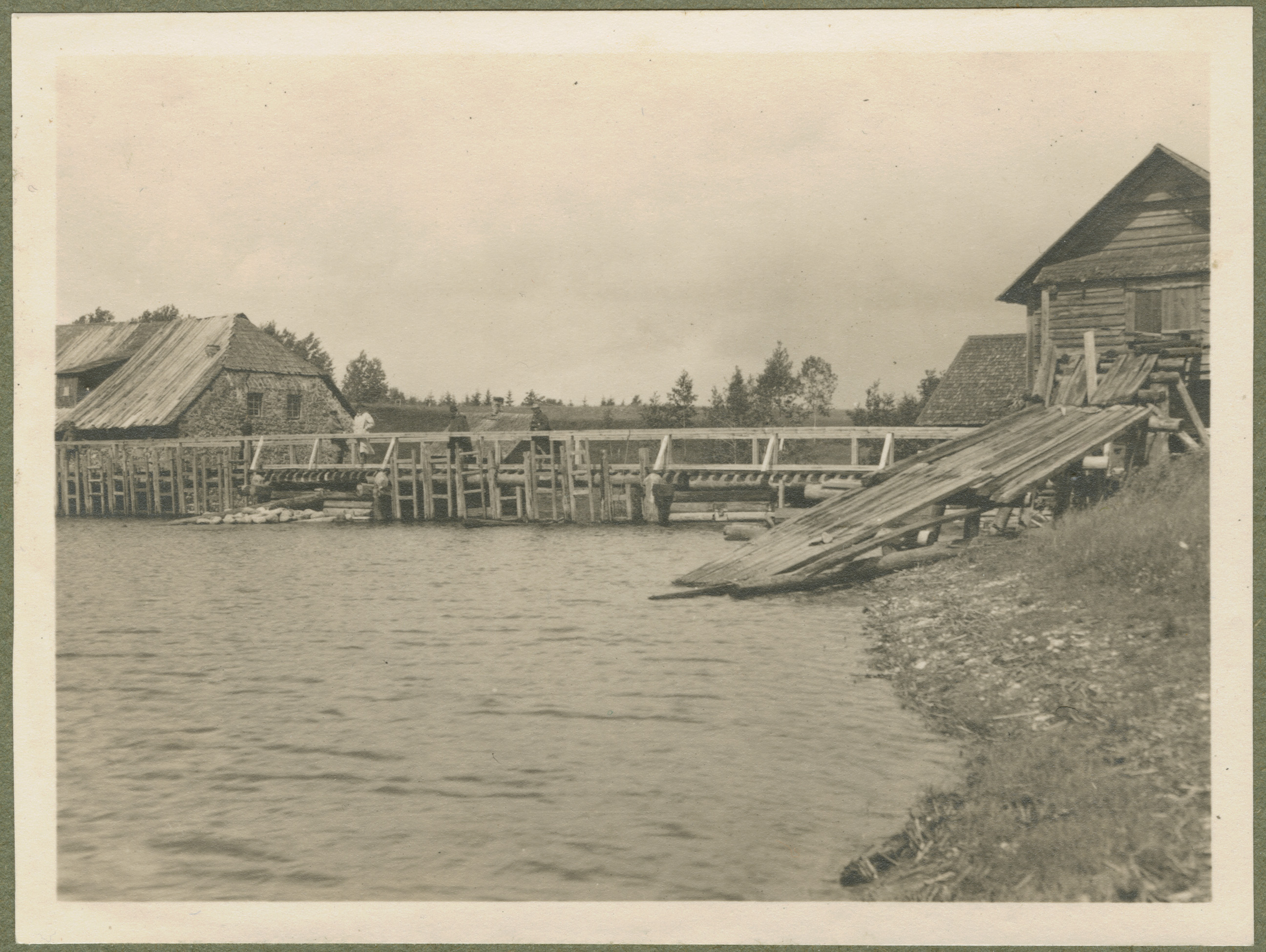
Vetla watermill in 1920s

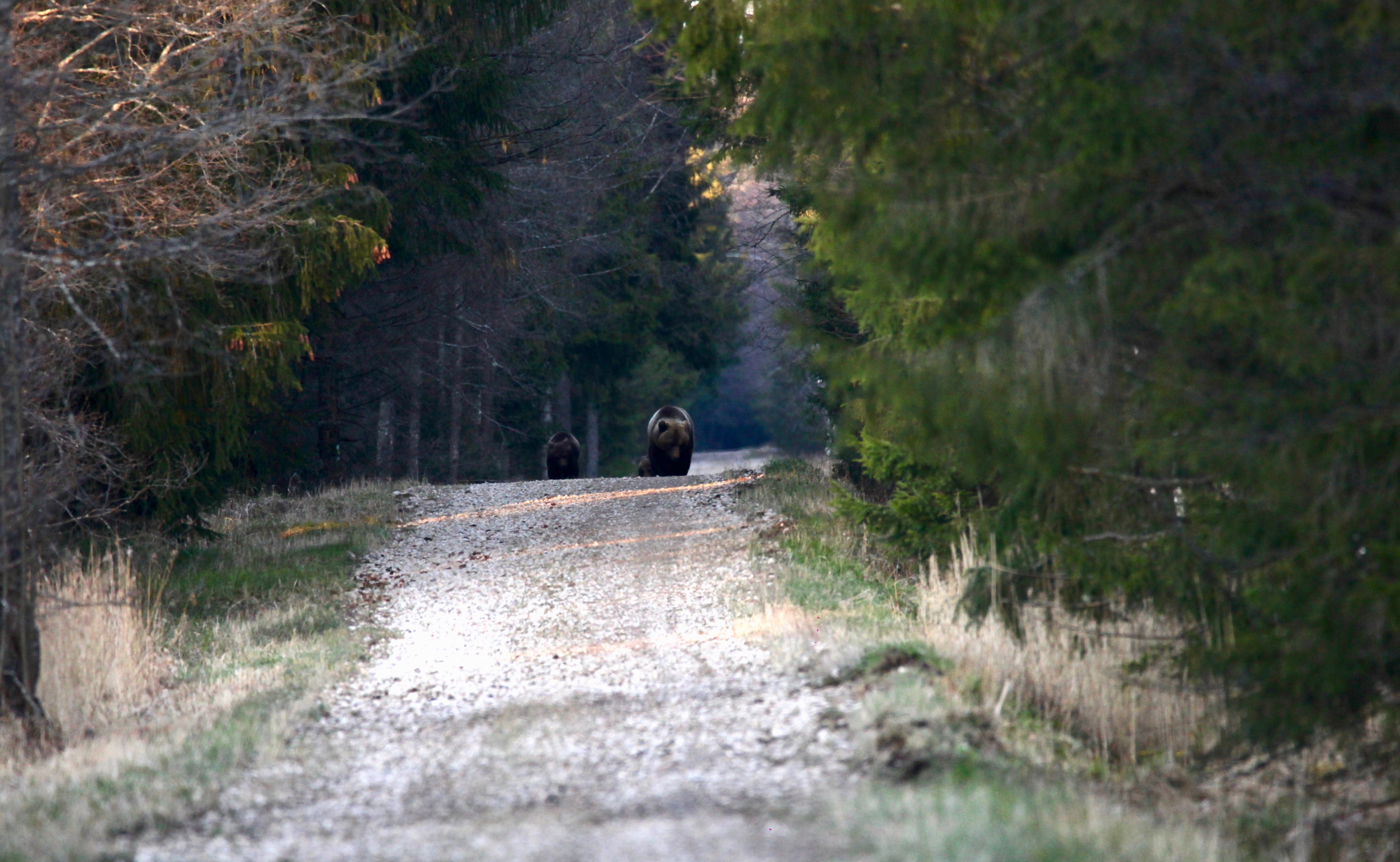
Bear family in Vetla

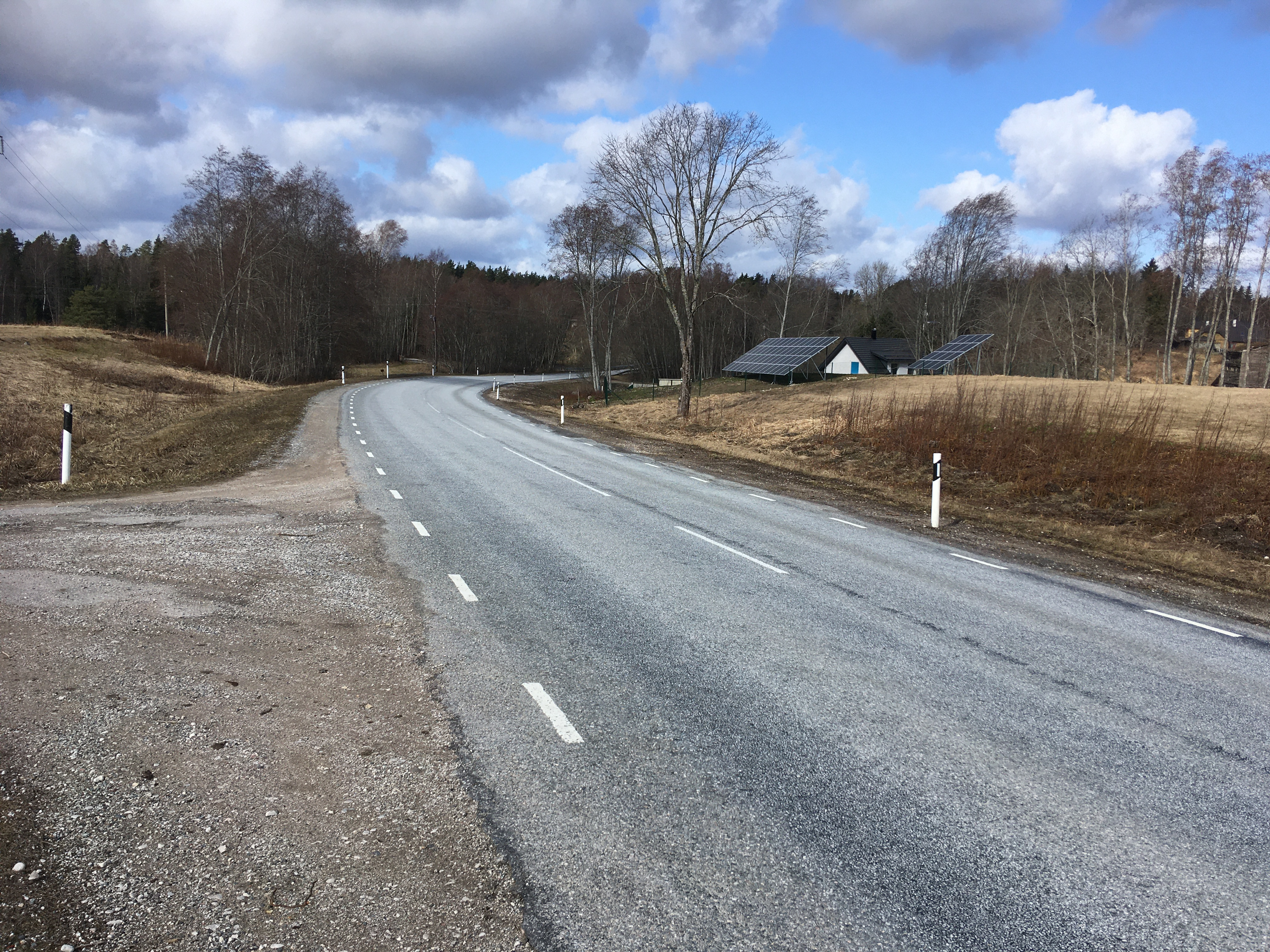
Highway in Vetla, 2021

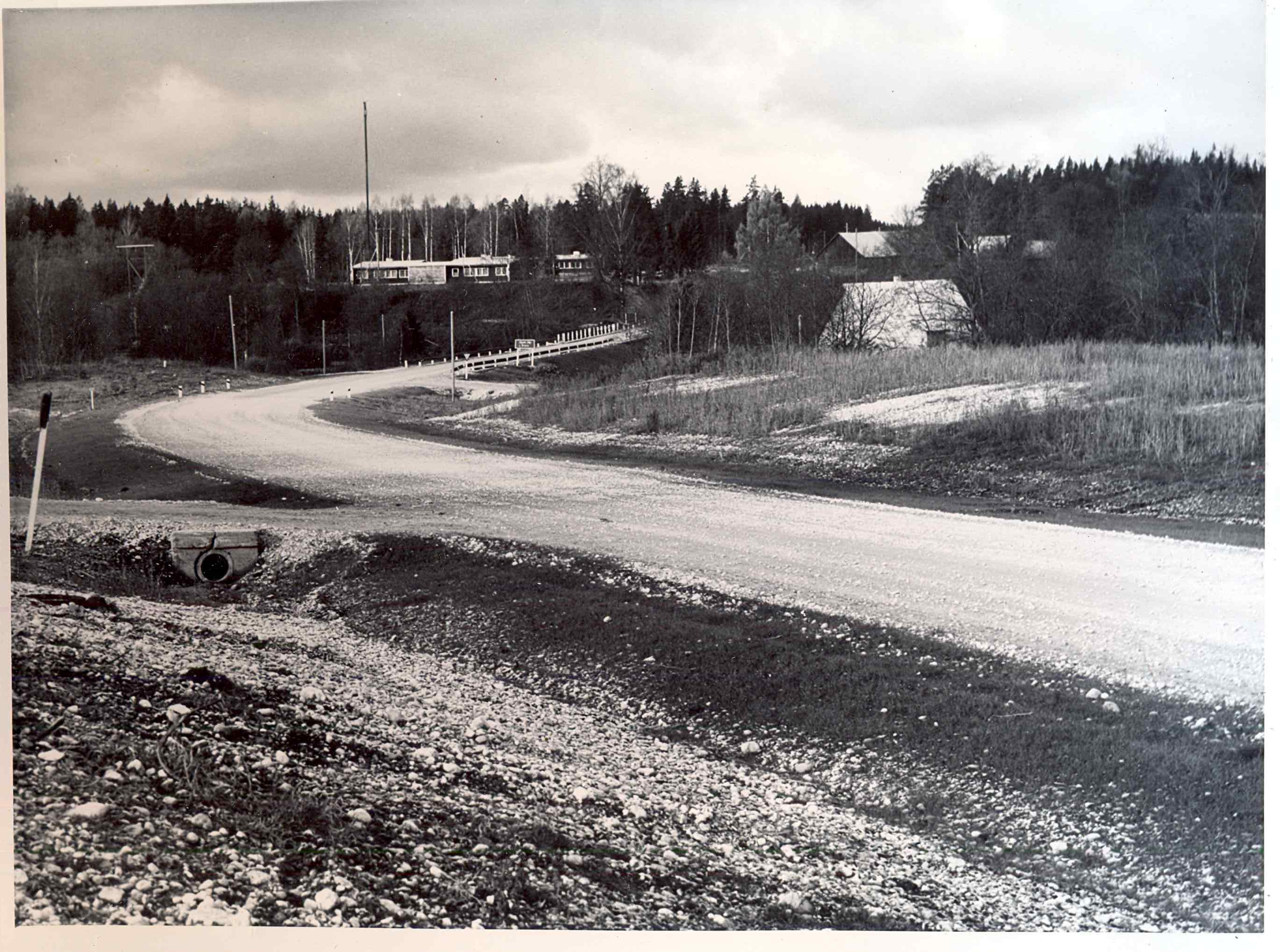
Highway in Vetla, 1978

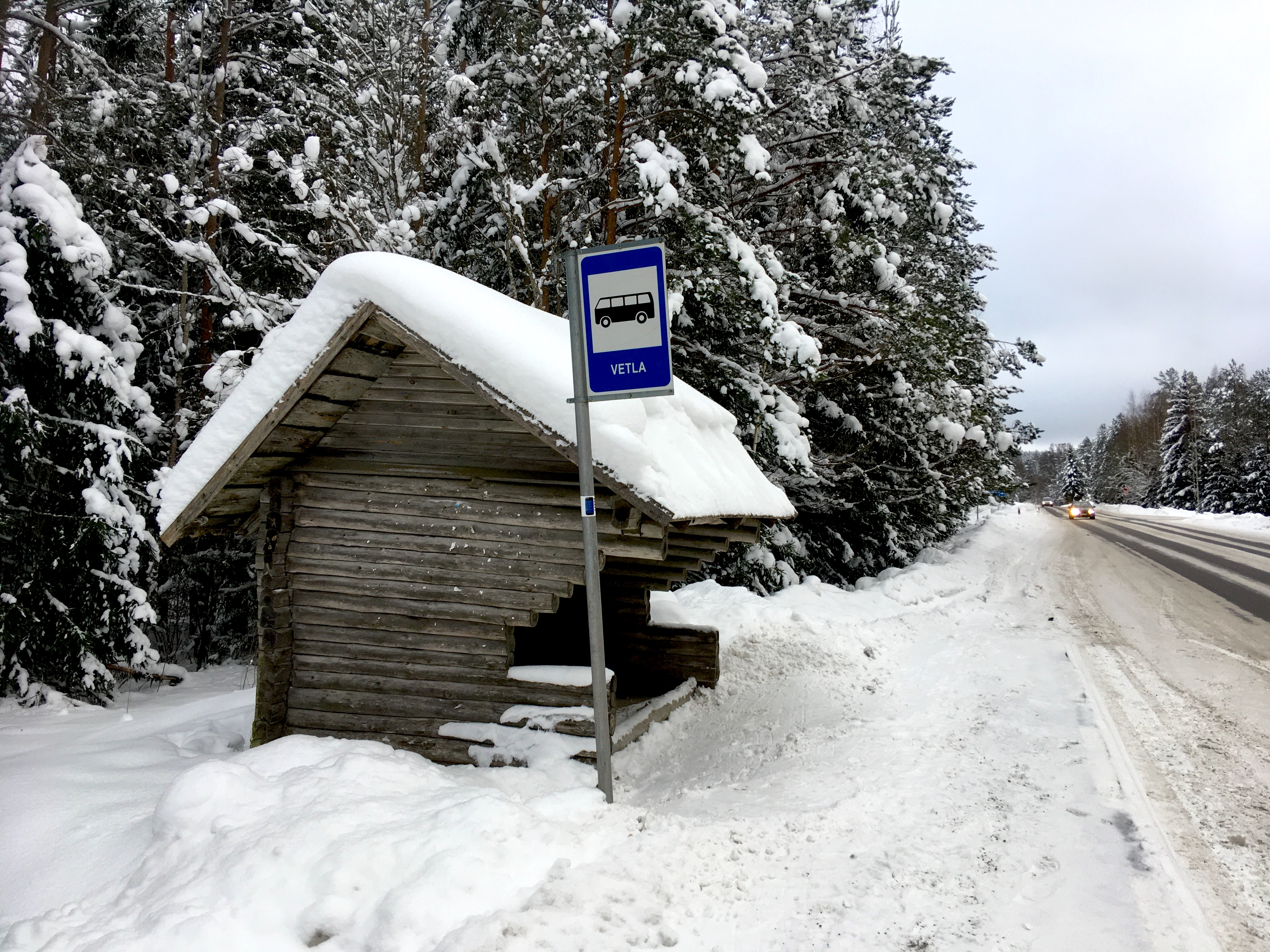
Bus stop in Vetla

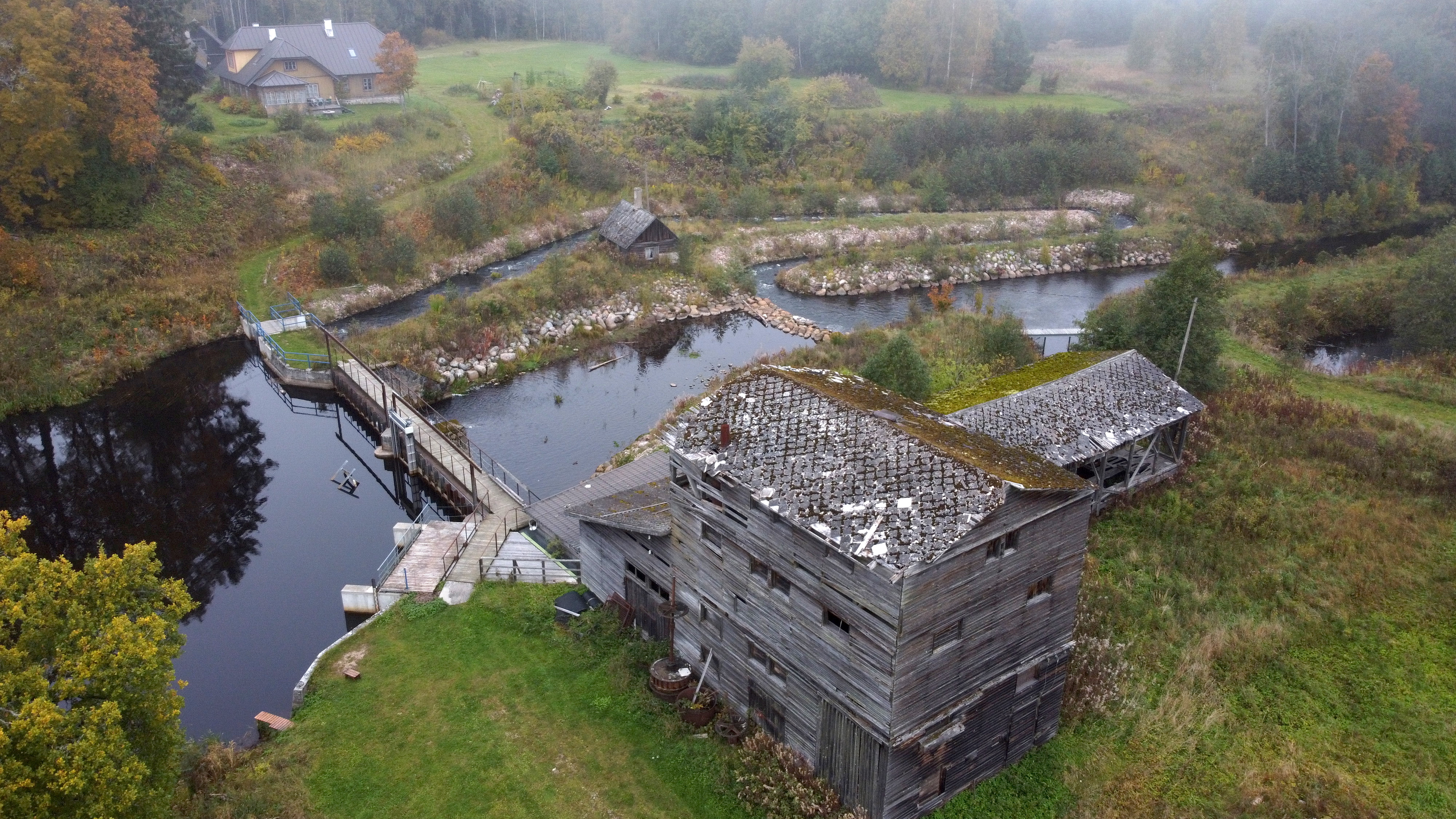
Watermill in Vetla, 2021
