= Kihmla =

Village in Estonia

- Village
- Location in Estonia
- Coordinates: 59°21′51″N 25°16′04″E
- Country: Estonia
- County: Harju County
- Municipality: Anija Parish

Population (01.01.2010)
  - Total: 36

Kihmla is a village in Anija Parish, Harju County in northern Estonia. It has a population of 36 (as of 1 January 2010).
