= Lilli, Harju County =

Village in Estonia

Lilli
- Village
- Location in Estonia
- Coordinates: 59°22′19″N 25°21′12″E
- Country: Estonia
- County: Harju County
- Municipality: Anija Parish

Population (01.01.2010)
  - Total: 118

Lilli is a village in Anija Parish, Harju County in northern Estonia. located on the right bank of the Jägala River, about 4 km (2 mi) north of the town of Kehra. Lilli has a population of 118 (as of 1 January 2010).
