= Lehtse Parish =

Former municipality of Estonia

Lehtse Parish Lehtse vald
- Former municipality of Estonia
- Interactive map of Lehtse Parish
- Coordinates: 59.25°N 25.83°E
- Country: Estonia
- Administrative centre: Lehtse

Lehtse Parish (Estonian: Lehtse vald) was a rural municipality of Estonia, in Järva County. The parish existed until 1950. The parish was re-established in 1991. In 2005 the parish was liquidated.
