= Voose, Harju County =

Village in Estonia

Voose
- Village
- Location in Estonia
- Coordinates: 59°12′21″N 25°25′24″E
- Country: Estonia
- County: Harju County
- Municipality: Anija Parish

Population (1 January 2010)
  - Total: 78

Drone video of Voose village (September 2021)

Voose is a village in Anija Parish, Harju County in northern Estonia. It has a population of 78 (as of 1 January 2010).
