= Pillapalu =

Village in Harju County, Estonia

- Village
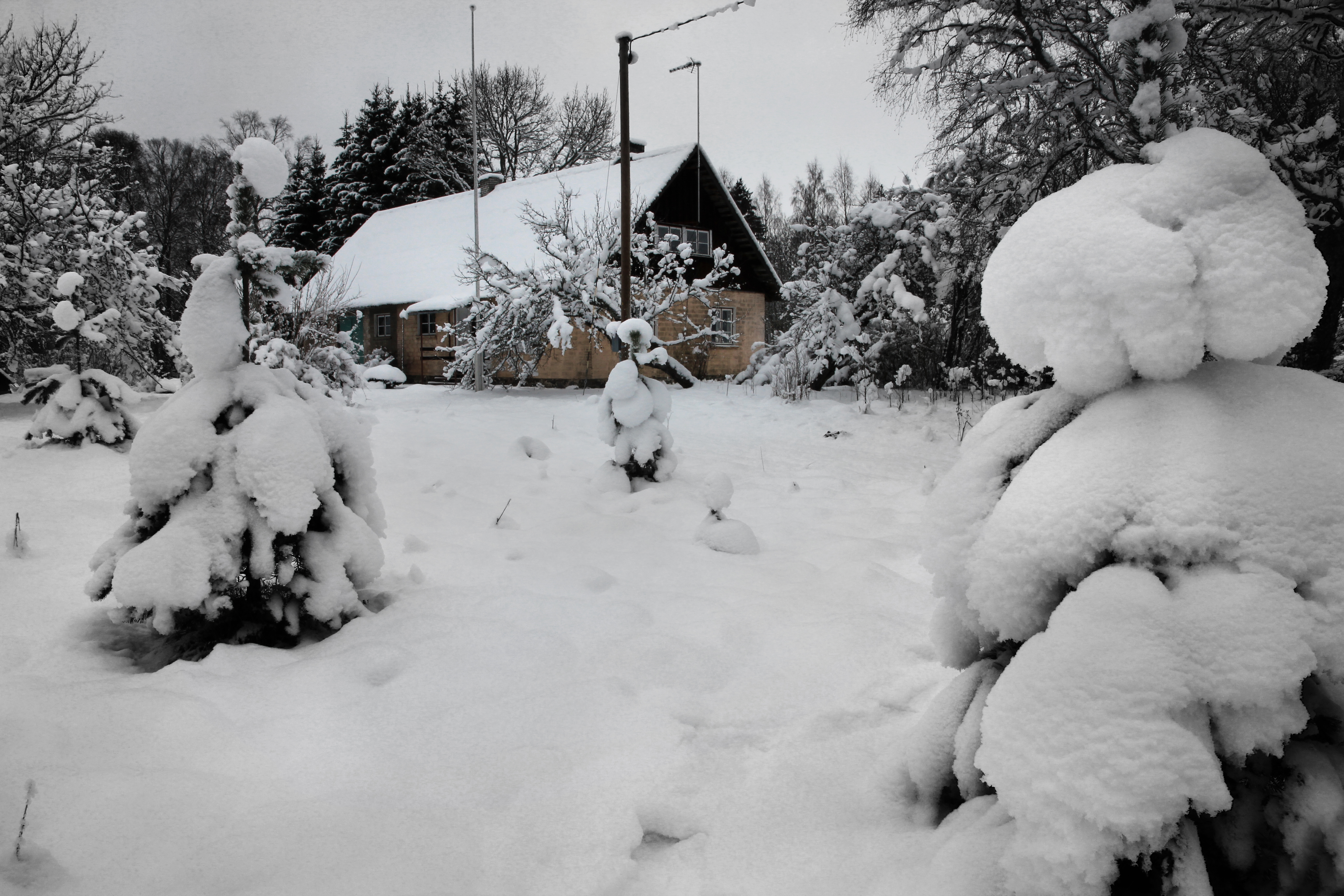
- Pillapalu homestead in winter

- Location in Estonia
- Coordinates: 59°20′57″N 25°34′39″E
- Country: Estonia
- County: Harju County
- Municipality: Anija Parish

Area
  - Total: 135 km^{2} (52 sq mi)
- Highest elevation (Pukimägi): 98.2 m (322 ft)
- Lowest elevation: 59 m (194 ft)

Population (2020)
  - Total: 94
  - Density: 0.70/km^{2} (1.8/sq mi)

Ethnicity (2011)
  - Estonians: 93.9%
  - other: 6.1%
- Time zone: UTC+2 (EET)
  - Summer (DST): UTC+3 (EEST)
- Postal Codes: 74502

Pillapalu is a village in Anija Parish, Harju County, Estonia.

Soodla reservoir and several big bogs are located in the village.

As of 1 August 2020, the village had a population of 94.

The northwestern part of the village's territory is occupied by Soodla training area of the Estonian Defence Forces.
