= Peningi =

Village in Estonia

Coordinates: 59°20′N 25°09′E

- Village
- Interactive map of Peningi
- Country: Estonia
- County: Harju County
- Parish: Raasiku Parish
- Time zone: UTC+2 (EET)
  - Summer (DST): UTC+3 (EEST)

Peningi is a village in Raasiku Parish, Harju County in northern Estonia.
