= Nõmbra =

Village in Estonia

Coordinates: 59°14′N 25°15′E

- Village
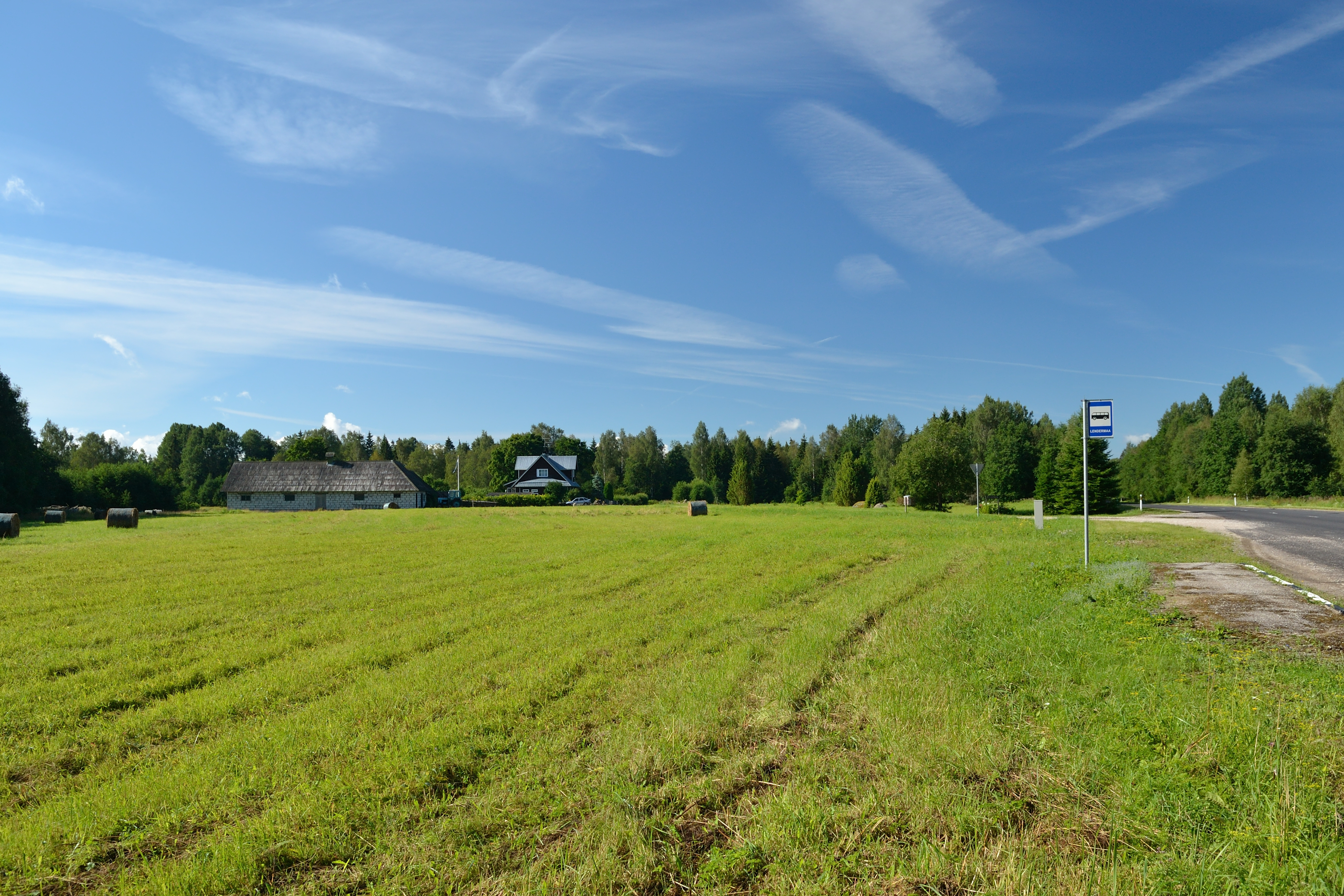
- Interactive map of Nõmbra
- Country: Estonia
- County: Harju County
- Parish: Kose Parish
- Time zone: UTC+2 (EET)
  - Summer (DST): UTC+3 (EEST)

Nõmbra is a village in Kose Parish, Harju County in northern Estonia.
