= Rasivere, Harju County =

Village in Estonia

Rasivere
- Village
- Location in Estonia
- Coordinates: 59°12′39″N 25°20′19″E
- Country: Estonia
- County: Harju County
- Municipality: Anija Parish

Population (01.01.2010)
  - Total: 53

Rasivere is a village in Anija Parish, Harju County in northern Estonia. It has a population of 53 (as of 1 January 2010).
