= Sambu, Estonia =

Village in Estonia

Coordinates: 59°23′N 25°13′E

Sambu
- Village
- Interactive map of Sambu
- Country: Estonia
- County: Harju County
- Parish: Jõelähtme Parish
- Time zone: UTC+2 (EET)
  - Summer (DST): UTC+3 (EEST)

Sambu is a village in Jõelähtme Parish, Harju County in northern Estonia.
