= Kehra pulp and paper mill =

Company based in Estonia

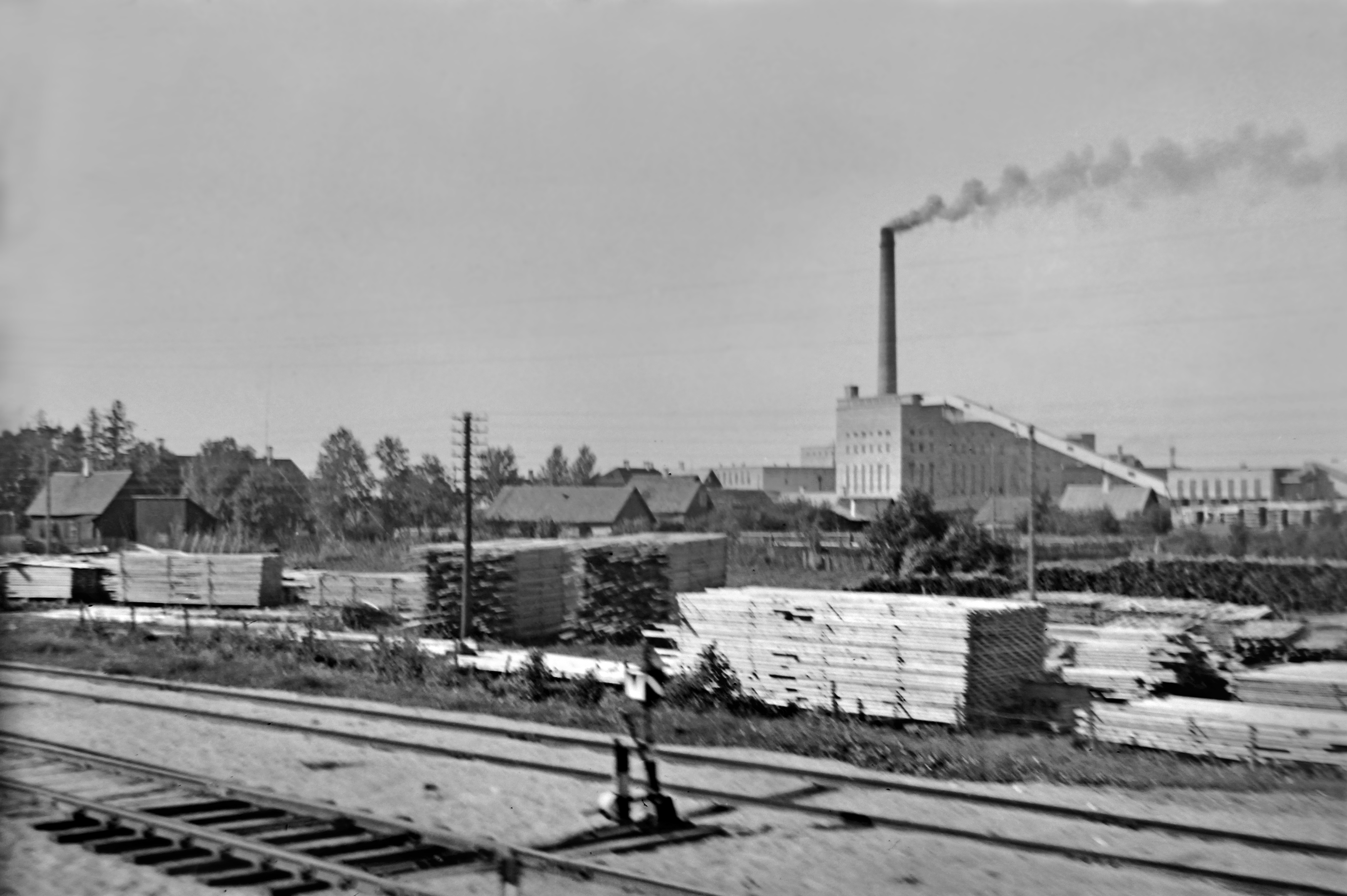
Kehra pulp and paper mill (1940)

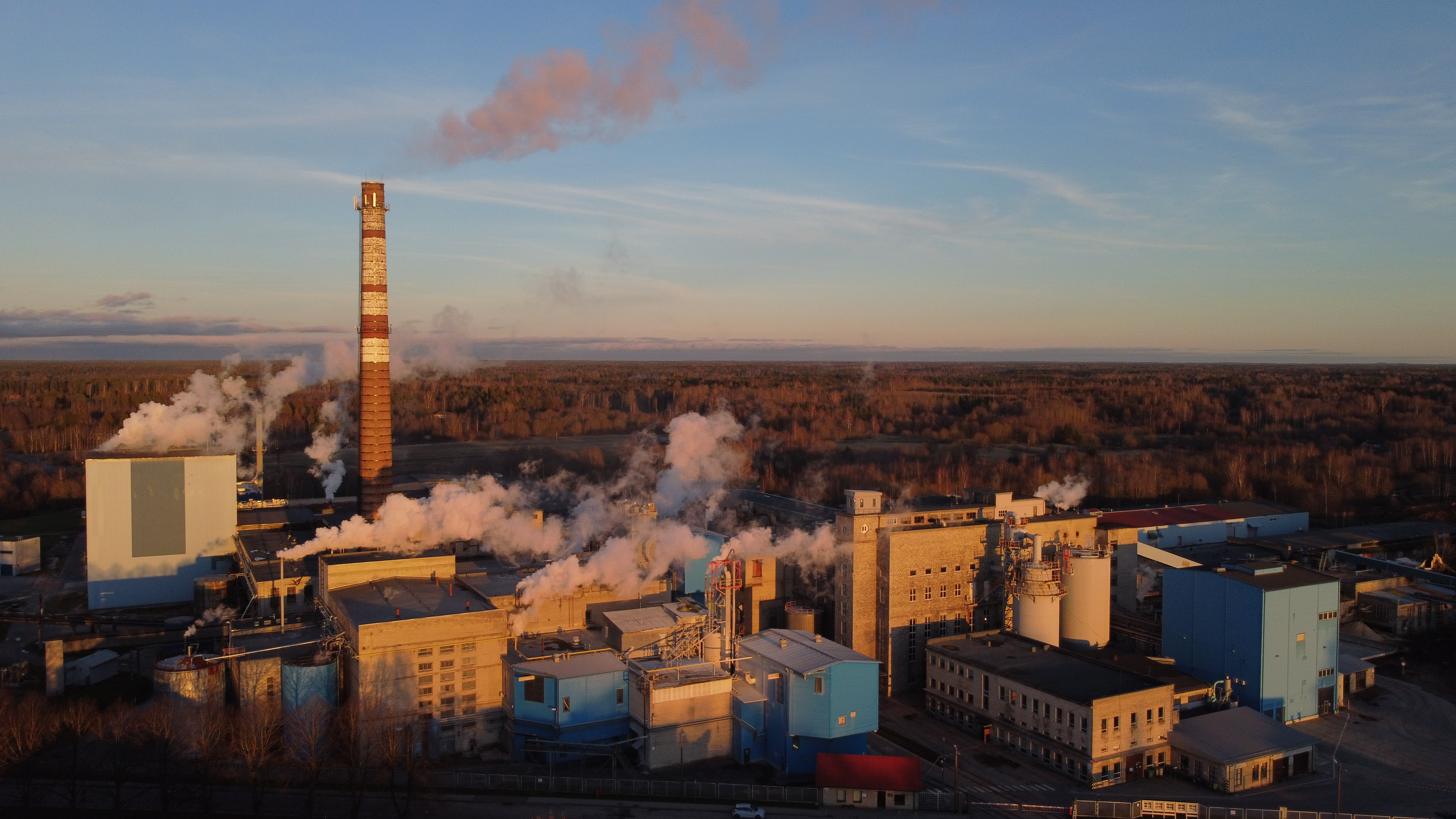
Kehra pulp and paper mill (2021)

Kehra pulp and paper mill (Estonian: Kehra tselluloositehas) is a pulp and paper mill in Kehra, Anija Parish, Estonia. The owner of the factory is Horizon Pulp & Paper Ltd.

The factory is designed by Roman Koolmar, Johann Ostrat and K. Zehren (Zeren). Factories' facilities were built between 1937 and 1938 by construction company Vennad Edenbergid.

In 1950, a paper factory was also built next to the factory. In 1957, a paper bag workshop was built.
