= Koitjärve =

Village in Estonia

Coordinates: 59°23′58″N 25°36′58″E

- Village
- Interactive map of Koitjärve
- Country: Estonia
- County: Harju County
- Parish: Kuusalu Parish
- Time zone: UTC+2 (EET)
  - Summer (DST): UTC+3 (EEST)

Koitjärve is a village in Kuusalu Parish, Harju County in northern Estonia.

The western part of the village's territory is occupied by Soodla training area and a small portion on the southeastern part is occupied by Keskpolügoon, both training areas of the Estonian Defence Forces.
