= Kaunissaare Reservoir =

Reservoir in Harju County, Estonia

- Kaunissaare veehoidla (Estonian)
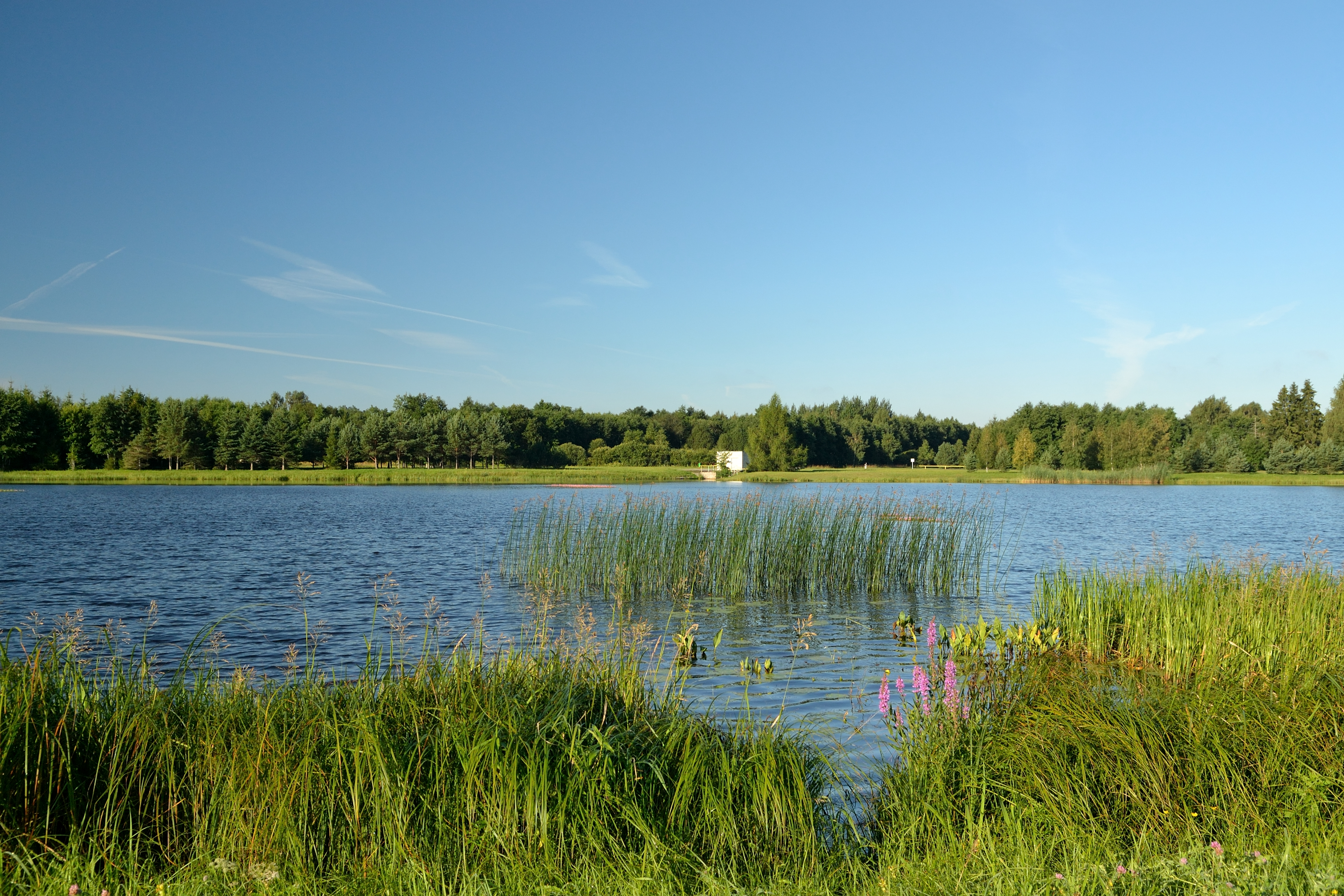
- The reservoir from the north

- Location within Estonia
- Location: Anija Parish, Harju County, Estonia
- Coordinates: 59.309°N 25.357°E
- Type: Reservoir
- Part of: Tallinn water supply system
- Primary inflows: Jägala River, Mulkoja, Aavoja-Kaunissaare Canal
- Primary outflows: Jägala River, Jägala–Pirita Canal
- Catchment area: 830.7 square kilometers (320.7 sq mi)
- Basin countries: Estonia
- Managing agency: Tallinna Vesi
- Built: 1980
- First flooded: 1984
- Max. length: 1,360 meters (4,460 ft)
- Max. width: 300 meters (980 ft)
- Surface area: 30.0 hectares (74 acres)
- Average depth: 2.3 meters (7 ft 7 in)
- Max. depth: 5.0 meters (16.4 ft)
- Water volume: 1,603,000 cubic meters (56,600,000 cu ft)
- Residence time: 3–5 weeks
- Shore length^{1}: 4,070 meters (13,350 ft)
- Surface elevation: 49.0 meters (160.8 ft)
- Islands: 3
- Settlements: Kaunissaare
- ^{1} Shore length is not a well-defined measure.

The Kaunissaare Reservoir (Estonian: Kaunissaare veehoidla) is a lake in Estonia. It is located on the Jägala River in the village of Kaunissaare in Anija Parish, Harju County, near Kehra.

The reservoir is part of the Tallinn water supply system and is connected to the Pirita, Soodla, and Aavoja rivers via canals.

== Physical description ==
The lake has an area of 30.0 hectares (74 acres), and it has three islands with a combined area of 0.5 hectares (1.2 acres). The lake has an average depth of 2.3 meters (7 ft 7 in) and a maximum depth of 5.0 meters (16.4 ft). It is 1,360 meters (4,460 ft) long, and its shoreline measures 4,070 meters (13,350 ft). It has a volume of 1,603,000 cubic meters (56,600,000 cu ft).

== History ==
The construction of the reservoir took place between 1980 and 1984. A fish passage was built between the reservoir and downstream Jägala River in 2015.

== Gallery ==
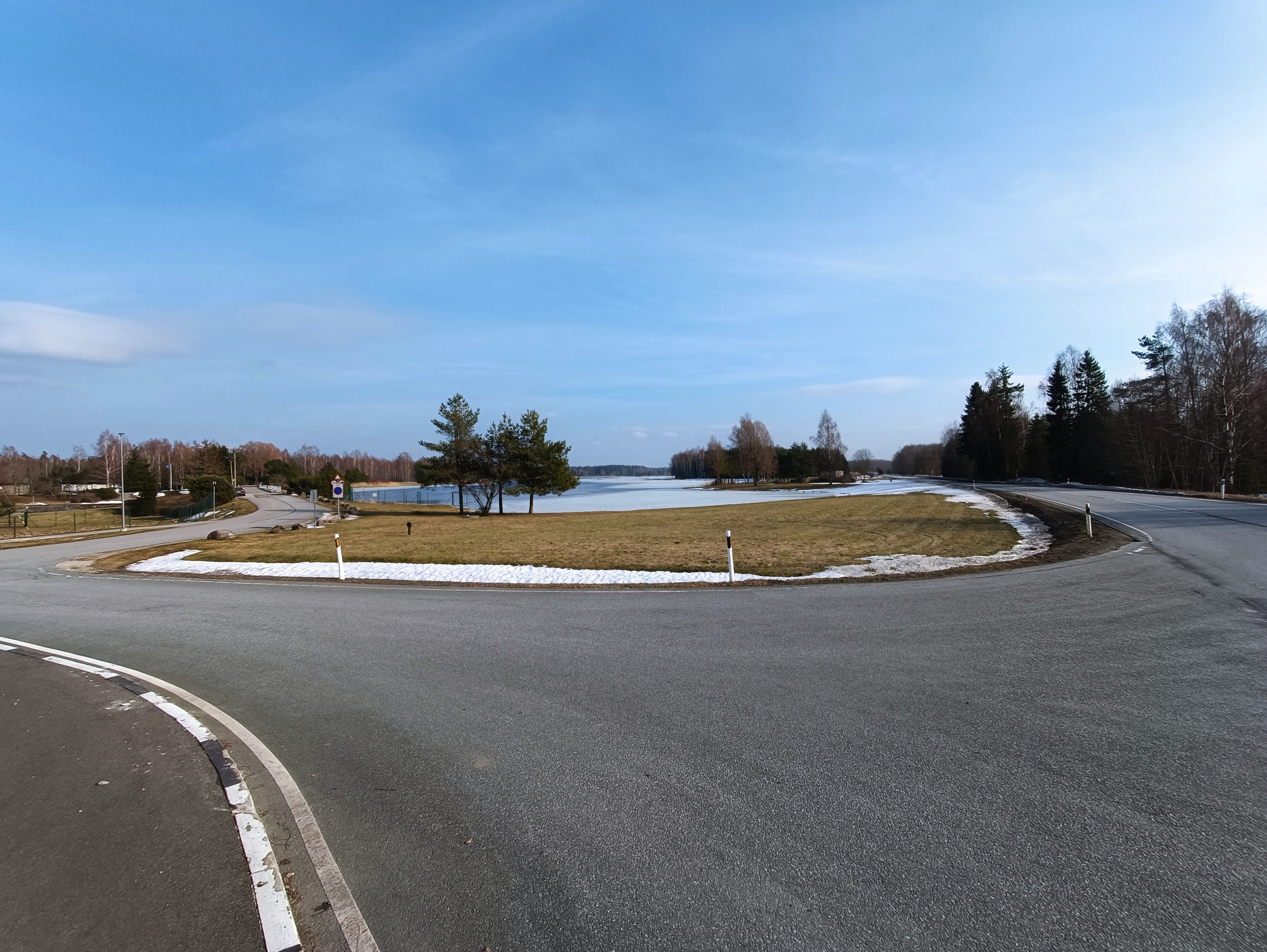
Intersection just west of the Kaunissaare Reservoir

== See also ==
- Soodla Reservoir
- Raudoja Reservoir
- Aavoja Reservoir
- Paunküla Reservoir
- Vaskjala Reservoir
- Lake Ülemiste
- List of lakes of Estonia
