= Soodla Reservoir =

Reservoir in Harju County, Estonia

- Soodla veehoidla (Estonian)
- Location within Estonia
- Location: Anija Parish, Harju County, Estonia
- Coordinates: 59.3903°N 25.5272°E
- Type: Reservoir
- Part of: Tallinn water supply system
- Primary inflows: Soodla River
- Primary outflows: Soodla River, Raudoja Reservoir
- Catchment area: 178.2 square kilometers (68.8 sq mi)
- Basin countries: Estonia
- Managing agency: Tallinna Vesi
- Built: 1981
- First flooded: 1981
- Max. length: 7,330 meters (24,050 ft)
- Max. width: 1,300 meters (4,300 ft)
- Surface area: 262.5 hectares (649 acres)
- Average depth: 3.6 meters (12 ft)
- Max. depth: 12.5 meters (41 ft)
- Water volume: 9,685,000 cubic meters (342,000,000 cu ft)
- Residence time: 4–5 weeks
- Shore length^{1}: 25,810 meters (84,680 ft)
- Surface elevation: 65.0 meters (213.3 ft)
- Islands: 4
- Settlements: Pillapalu, Raudoja
- ^{1} Shore length is not a well-defined measure.

The Soodla Reservoir (Estonian: Soodla veehoidla) is a lake in Estonia. It is located on the Soodla River in the village of Pillapalu in Anija Parish, Harju County, near Kehra and Kuusalu.

The reservoir is part of the Tallinn water supply system, and it feeds the Jägala, Aavoja, and Pirita rivers with water through the Raudoja Reservoir. Water flows from the Soodla Reservoir to the Raudoja Reservoir through a 704-meter (2,310 ft) long 1,000-millimeter (39 in) diameter steel pipe.

== Physical description ==
The lake has an area of 262.5 hectares (649 acres), and it has four islands with a combined area of 10.0 hectares (25 acres). The lake has an average depth of 3.6 meters (12 ft) and a maximum depth of 12.5 meters (41 ft). It is 7,330 meters (24,050 ft) long, and its shoreline measures 25,810 meters (84,680 ft). It has a volume of 9,685,000 cubic meters (342,000,000 cu ft).

== History ==
Plans to build the reservoir date back to 1975. The reservoir was built and flooded in 1981.

== See also ==
- Raudoja Reservoir
- Aavoja Reservoir
- Kaunissaare Reservoir
- Paunküla Reservoir
- Vaskjala Reservoir
- Lake Ülemiste
- List of lakes of Estonia
