= Raudoja Reservoir =

Reservoir in Harju County, Estonia

- Raudoja veehoidla (Estonian)
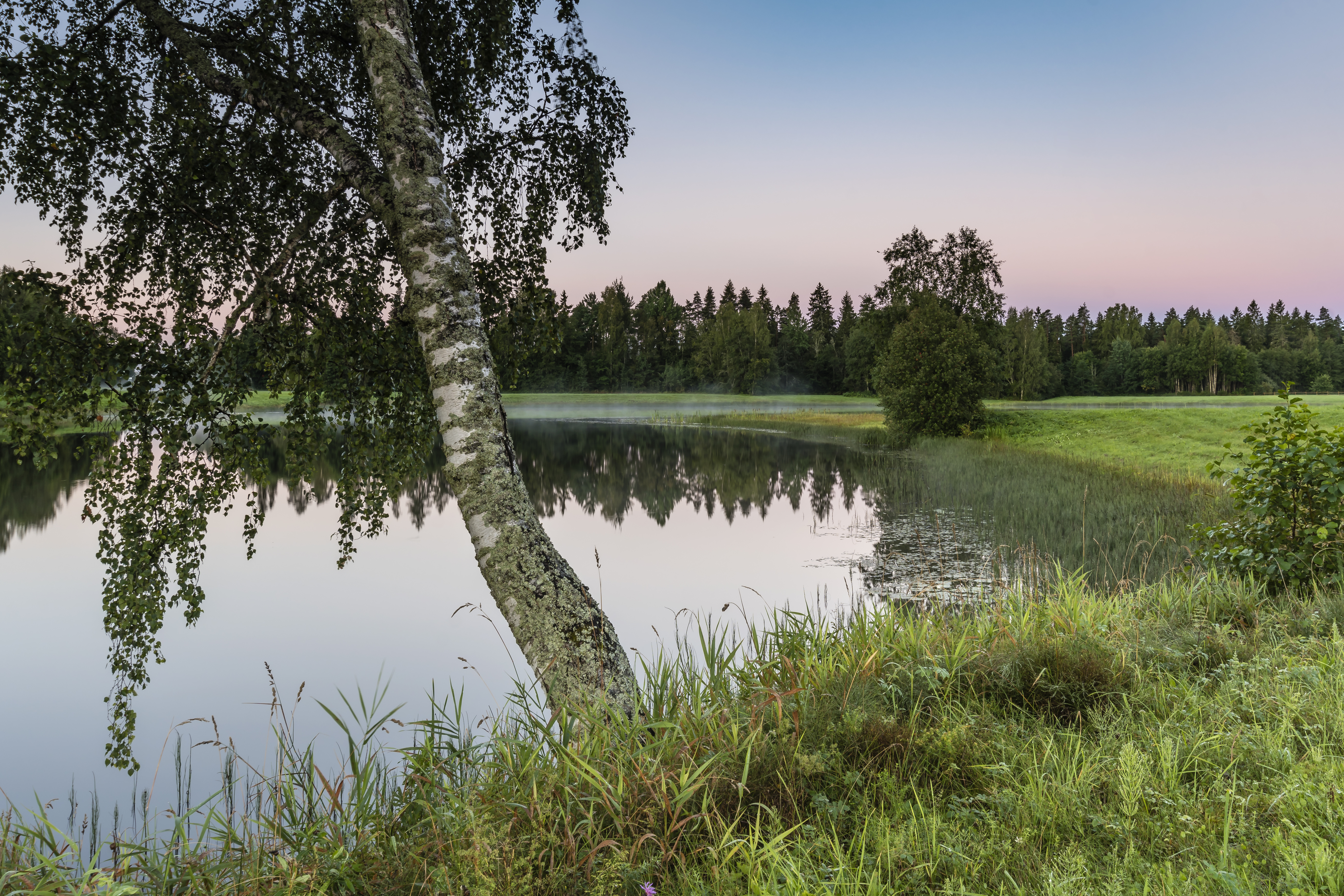
- The reservoir from a nearby road

- Location within Estonia
- Location: Anija Parish, Harju County, Estonia
- Coordinates: 59.3797°N 25.4689°E
- Type: Reservoir
- Part of: Tallinn water supply system
- Primary inflows: Soodla Reservoir, Raudoja River
- Primary outflows: Raudoja River, Raudoja-Aavoja Canal
- Catchment area: 22.9 km^{2} (8.8 sq mi)
- Basin countries: Estonia
- Managing agency: Tallinna Vesi
- Built: 1981
- First flooded: 1981
- Max. length: 930 meters (3,050 ft)
- Max. width: 160 meters (520 ft)
- Surface area: 8.2 hectares (20 acres)
- Average depth: 1.8 meters (5 ft 11 in)
- Water volume: 200,000 cubic meters (7,100,000 cu ft)
- Residence time: 4–5 weeks
- Shore length^{1}: 2,290 meters (7,510 ft)
- Surface elevation: 57.1 meters (187 ft)
- Settlements: Raudoja
- ^{1} Shore length is not a well-defined measure.

The Raudoja Reservoir (Estonian: Raudoja veehoidla) is a lake in Estonia. It is located on the Raudoja River in the village of Raudoja in Anija Parish, Harju County, near Kehra.

The reservoir is part of Tallinn water supply system and is connected to the Jägala, Pirita rivers via canals. Water flows from the Soodla Reservoir to the Raudoja Reservoir through a 704 m (2,310 ft) long 1,000 mm (39 in) diameter steel pipe. The water that keeps flowing in Raudoja river past the reservoir ends up in Soodla river.

== Physical description ==
The lake has an area of 8.2 hectares (20 acres). The lake has an average depth of 1.8 meters (5 ft 11 in). It is 930 meters (3,050 ft) long, and its shoreline measures 2,290 meters (7,510 ft). It has a volume of 200,000 cubic meters (7,100,000 cu ft).

== History ==
The construction of the reservoir took place in 1981.

== See also ==
- Soodla Reservoir
- Aavoja Reservoir
- Kaunissaare Reservoir
- Paunküla Reservoir
- Vaskjala Reservoir
- Lake Ülemiste
- List of lakes of Estonia
