= Aavoja Reservoir =

Reservoir in Harju County, Estonia

- Aavoja veehoidla (Estonian)
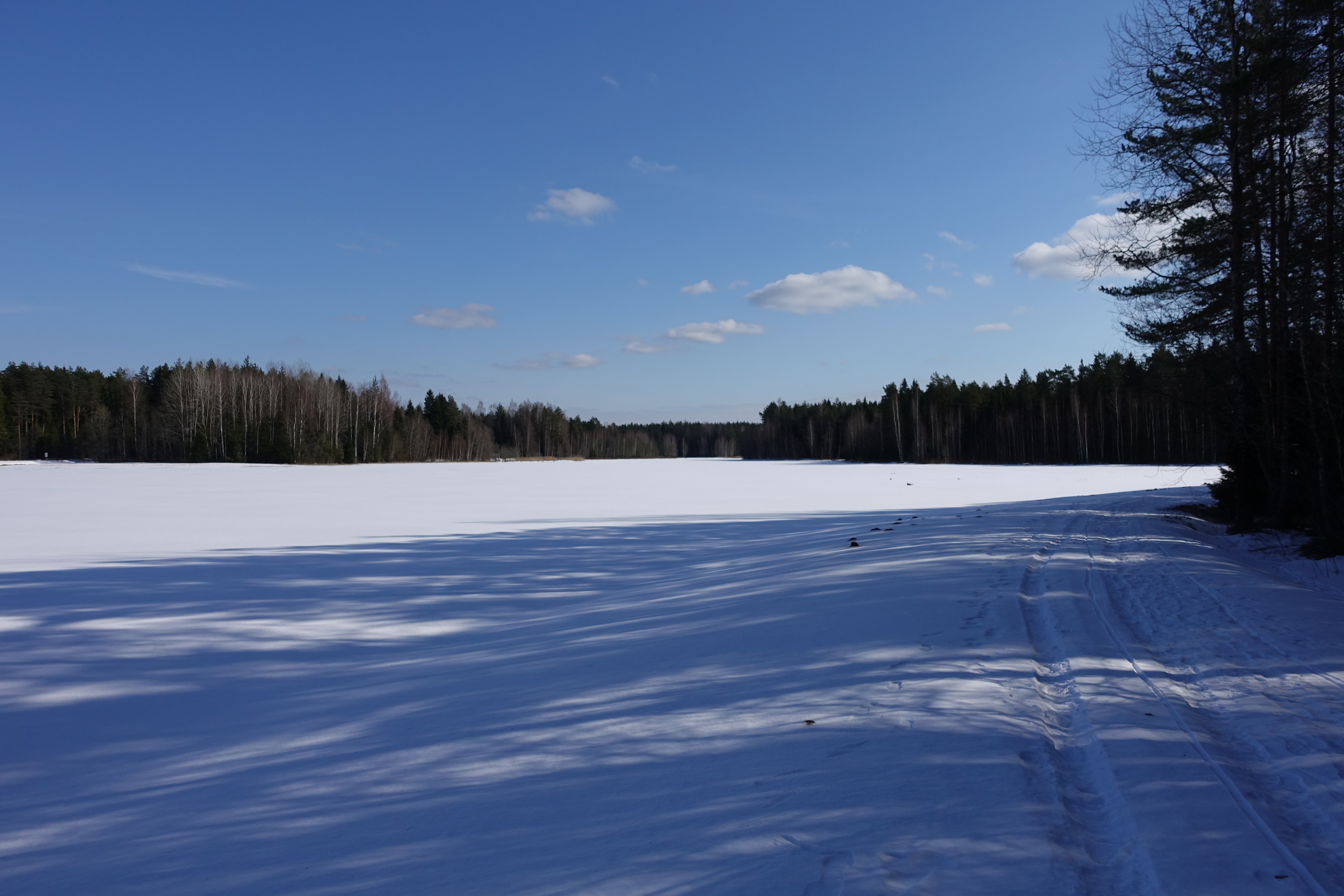
- The reservoir from the east

- Location within Estonia
- Location: Anija Parish, Harju County, Estonia
- Coordinates: 59.330278°N 25.384167°E
- Type: Reservoir
- Part of: Tallinn water supply system
- Primary inflows: Aavoja, Raudoja-Aavoja Canal, Aruoja, Verioja
- Primary outflows: Aavoja, Aavoja-Kaunissaare Canal
- Catchment area: 55 km^{2} (21 sq mi)
- Basin countries: Estonia
- Managing agency: Tallinna Vesi
- Built: 1980
- First flooded: 1983
- Max. length: 1,590 meters (5,220 ft)
- Max. width: 250 meters (820 ft)
- Surface area: 17.3 hectares (43 acres)
- Average depth: 1.6 meters (5 ft 3 in)
- Max. depth: 4.0 meters (13.1 ft)
- Water volume: 410,000 cubic meters (14,000,000 cu ft)
- Residence time: 2-3 weeks
- Shore length^{1}: 5,600 meters (18,400 ft)
- Surface elevation: 50.5 meters (166 ft)
- Settlements: Ülejõe, Vikipalu
- ^{1} Shore length is not a well-defined measure.

The Aavoja Reservoir (Estonian: Aavoja veehoidla, also known as Ülejõe veehoidla) is a lake in Estonia. It is located in the villages of Vikipalu and Ülejõe in Anija Parish, Harju County, on the Aavoja River.

The reservoir is part of the Tallinn water supply system and is connected to the Jägala, Pirita, and Soodla rivers via canals.

== Physical description ==
The lake has an area of 17.3 hectares (43 acres). The lake has an average depth of 1.6 meters (5 ft 3 in) and a maximum depth of 4.0 meters (13.1 ft). It is 1,590 meters (5,220 ft) long, and its shoreline measures 5,600 meters (18,400 ft). It has a volume of 410,000 cubic meters (14,000,000 cu ft).

== History ==
Construction of the reservoir took place between 1980 and 1983.

== See also ==
- Soodla Reservoir
- Raudoja Reservoir
- Kaunissaare Reservoir
- Paunküla Reservoir
- Vaskjala Reservoir
- Lake Ülemiste
- List of lakes of Estonia
