= Paunküla Reservoir =

Reservoir in Harju County, Estonia

- Paunküla veehoidla (Estonian)
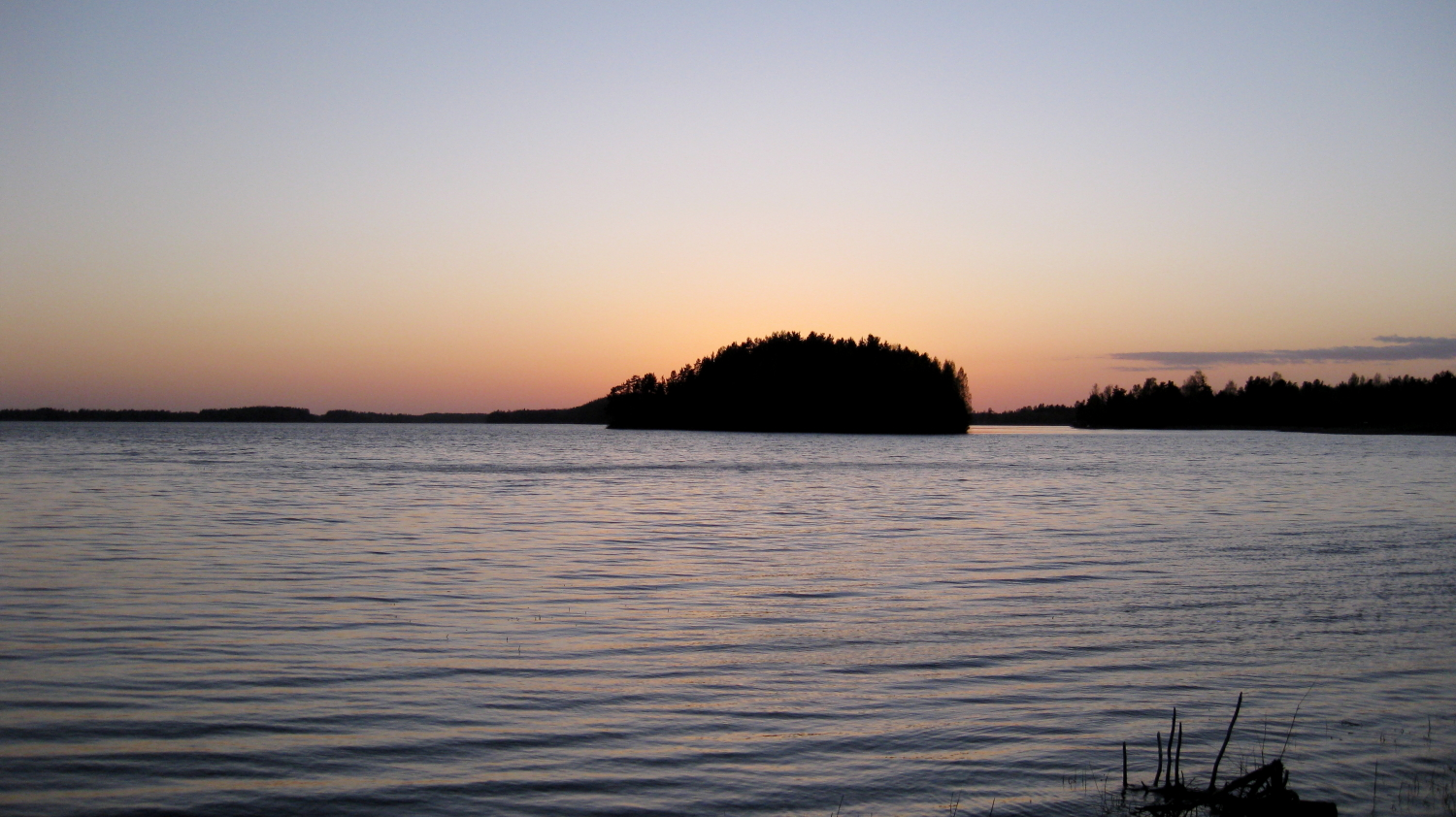

- Location within Estonia
- Location: Kose Parish, Harju County, Estonia
- Coordinates: 59.1156°N 25.3525°E
- Type: Reservoir
- Part of: Tallinn water supply system
- Primary inflows: Paunküla Stream, Palgissaare Stream, Sae-Paunküla Canal
- Primary outflows: Pirita River
- Catchment area: 90.1 square kilometers (34.8 sq mi)
- Basin countries: Estonia
- Managing agency: Tallinna Vesi
- Built: 1960
- First flooded: 1960
- Max. length: 3,980 meters (13,060 ft)
- Max. width: 1,800 meters (5,900 ft)
- Surface area: 420.2 hectares (1,038 acres)
- Average depth: 3.2 meters (10 ft)
- Max. depth: 8.2 meters (27 ft)
- Water volume: 13,573,000 cubic meters (479,300,000 cu ft)
- Residence time: 8 weeks
- Shore length^{1}: 25,230 meters (82,780 ft)
- Surface elevation: 72.5 meters (238 ft)
- Islands: 21
- Settlements: Kiruvere, Ardu
- ^{1} Shore length is not a well-defined measure.

Drone video of the Paunküla Reservoir in Estonia (September 2021)

The Paunküla Reservoir (Estonian: Paunküla veehoidla) is a lake in Estonia. It is located in the village of Kiruvere in Kose Parish, Harju County, near Ardu.

The reservoir is part of the Tallinn water supply system and is connected to the upstream Jägala River via the Sae–Paunküla Canal. The Pirita River runs isolated along the southern shore of the reservoir in a ditch and is only connected to the reservoir at its northeastern end.

== Physical description ==
The lake has an area of 420.2 hectares (1,038 acres), and it has 21 islands with a combined area of 30.1 hectares (74 acres). The lake has an average depth of 3.2 meters (10 ft) and a maximum depth of 8.2 meters (27 ft). It is 3,980 meters (13,060 ft) long, and its shoreline measures 25,230 meters (82,780 ft). It has a volume of 13,573,000 cubic meters (479,300,000 cu ft).

== History ==
The reservoir was first flooded in 1960. The reservoir reached its current size in 1979.

== Gallery ==
Photos from 1979 reconstruction

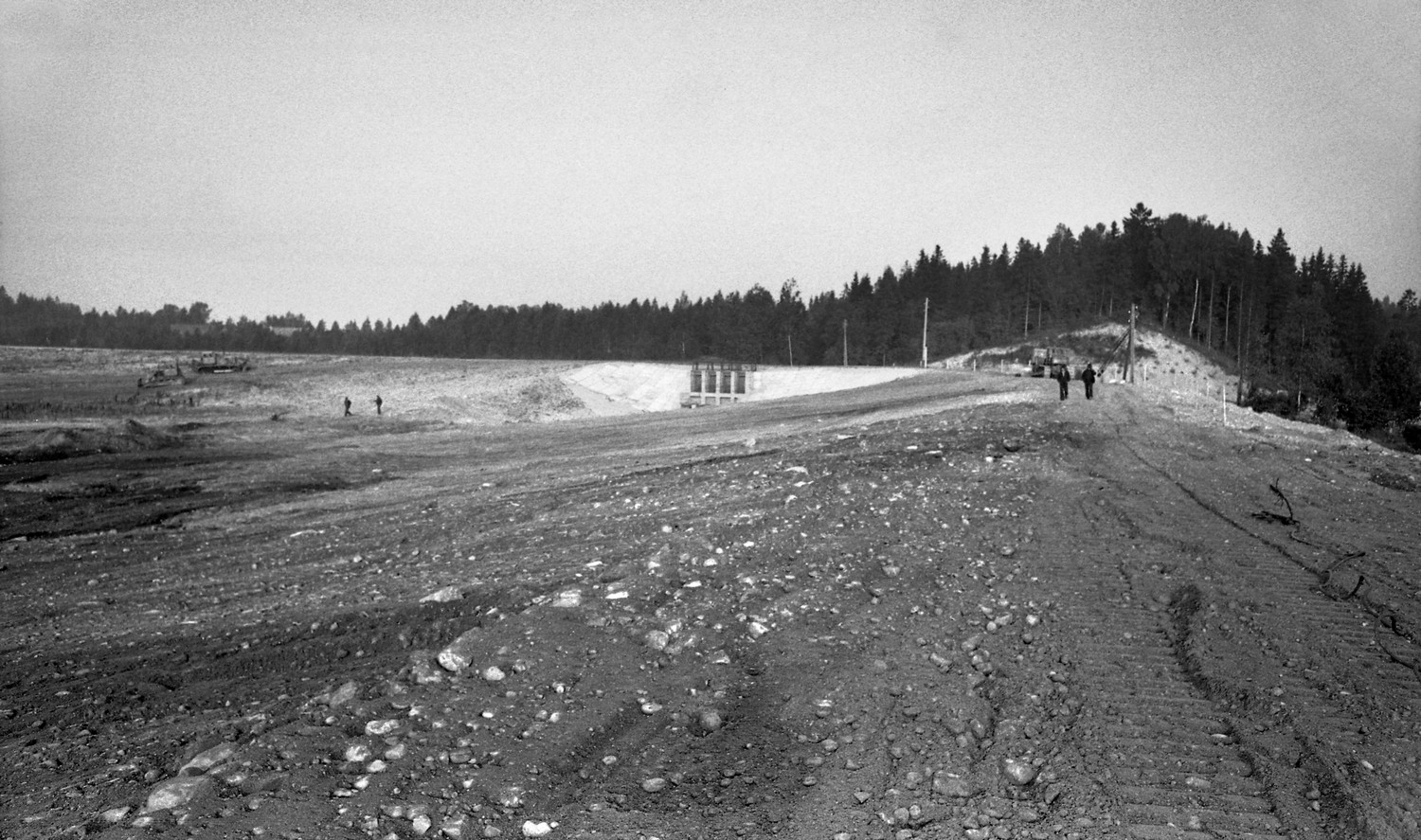

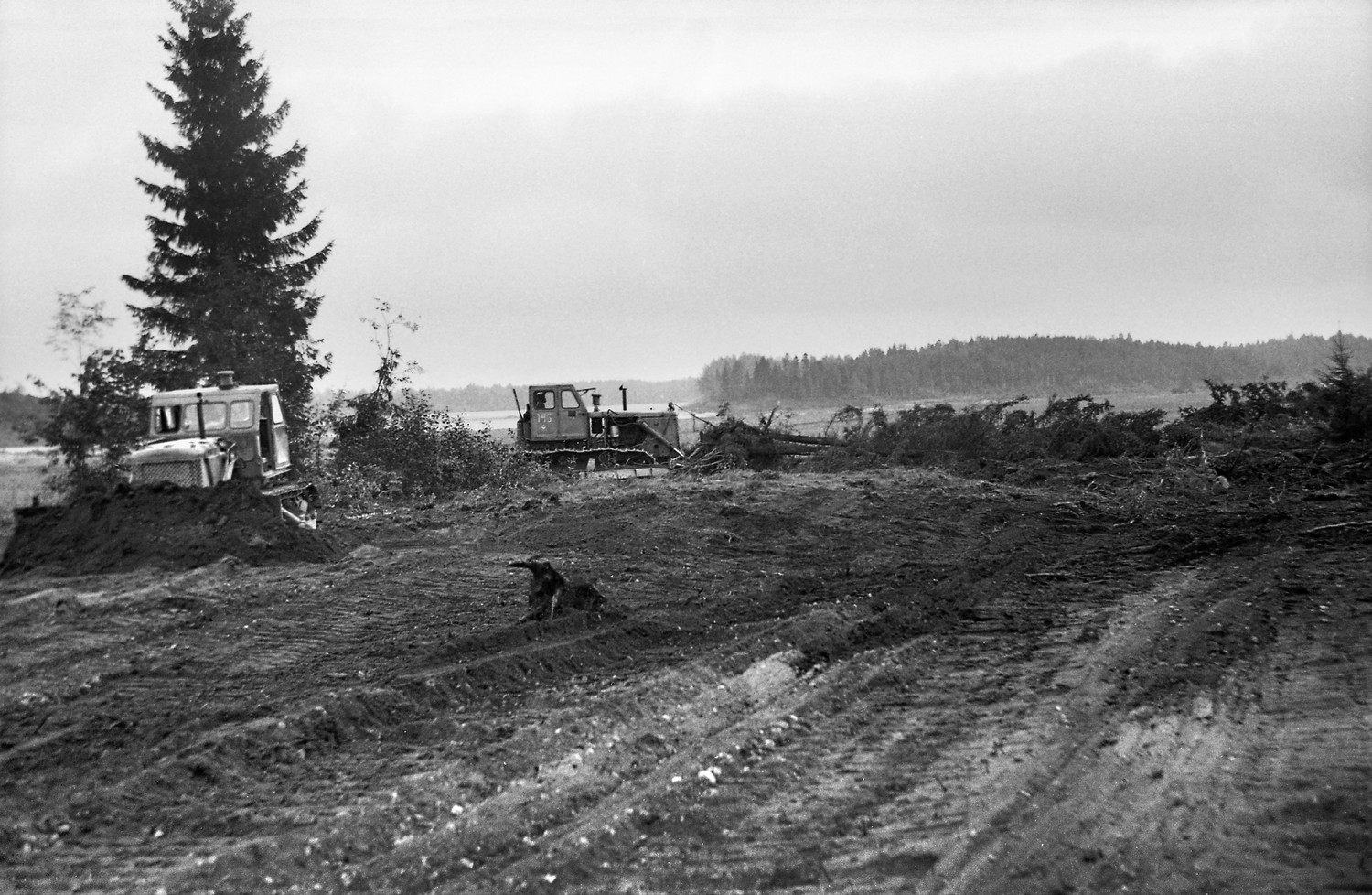

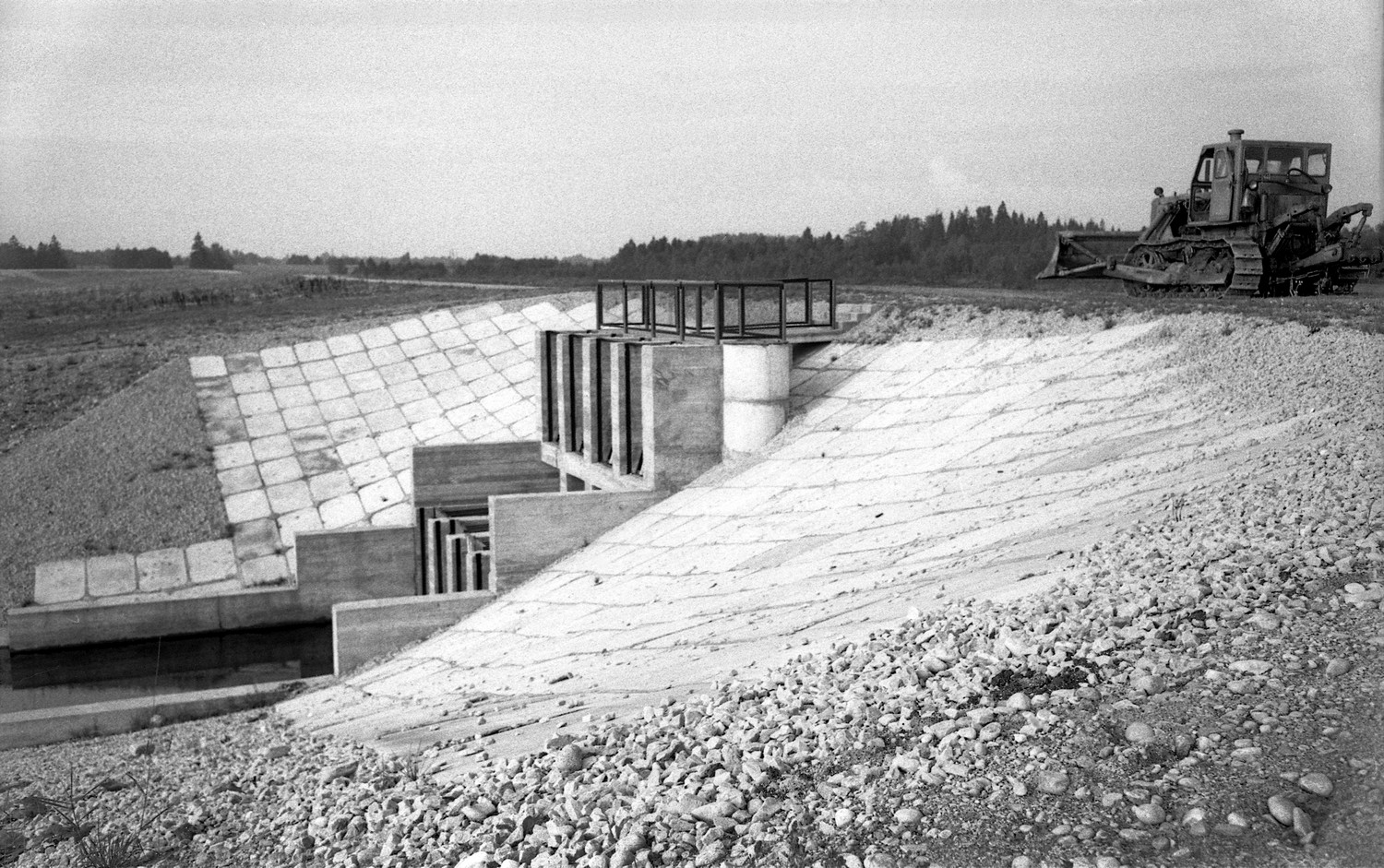

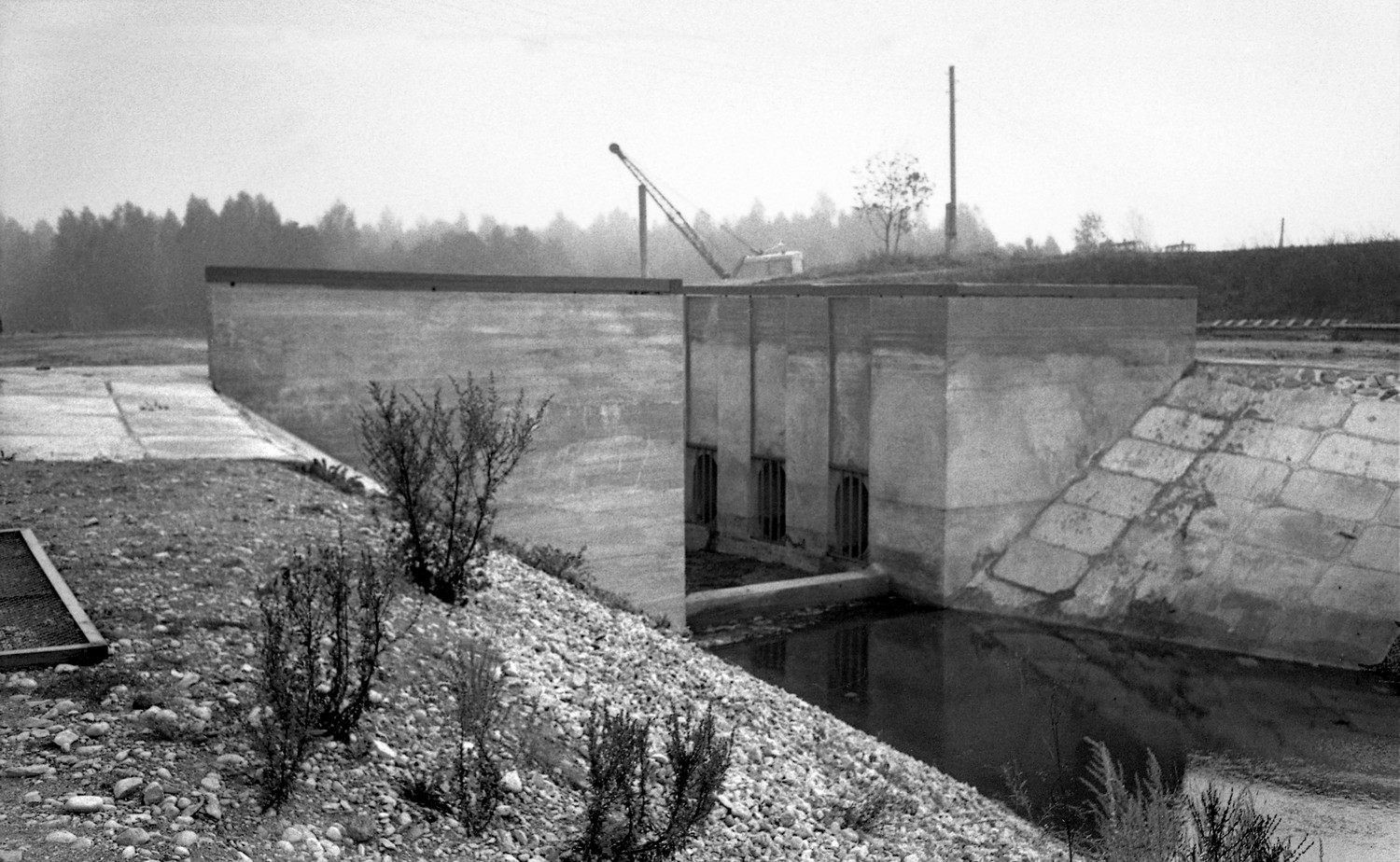

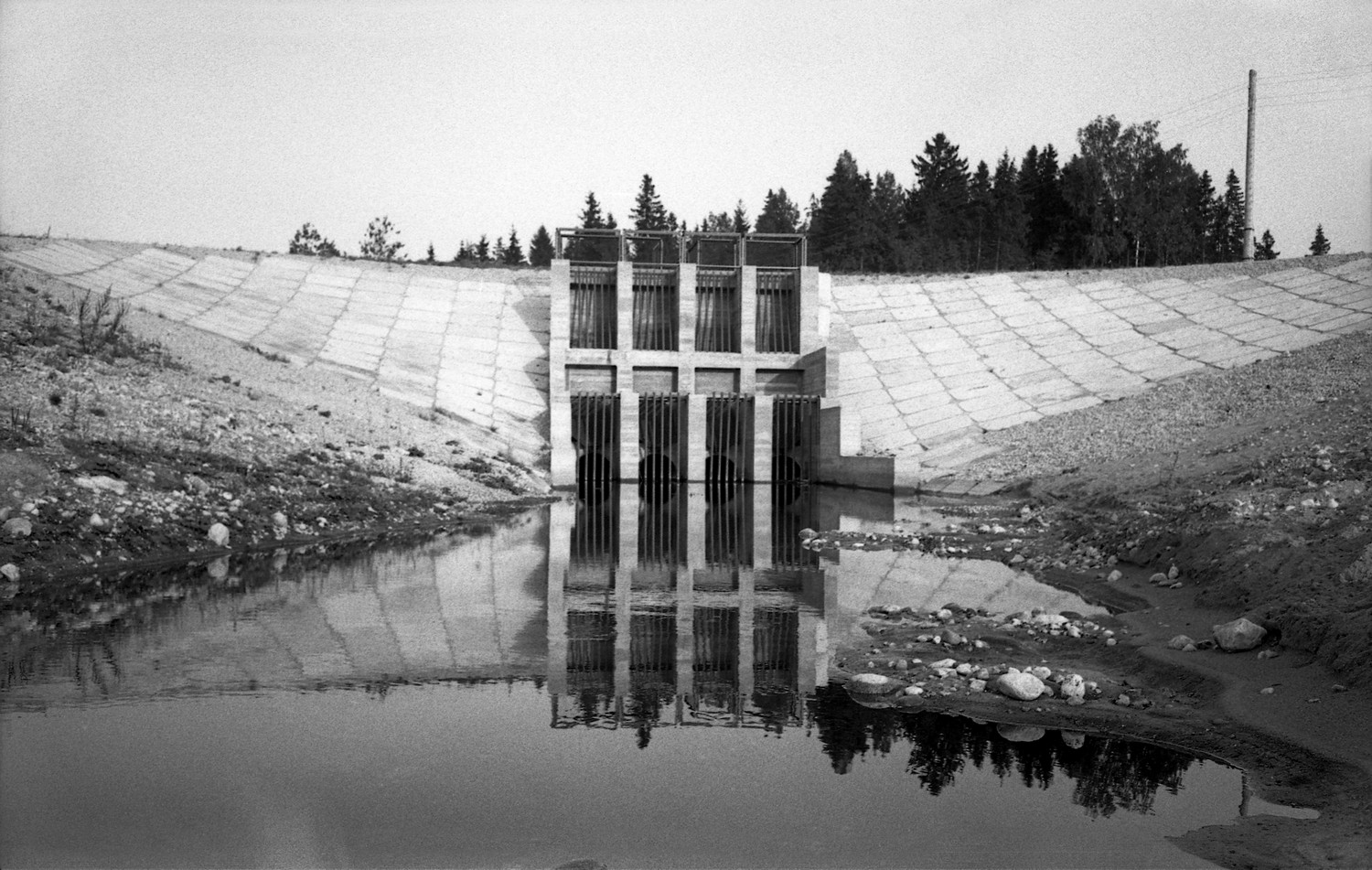

== See also ==
- Soodla Reservoir
- Raudoja Reservoir
- Aavoja Reservoir
- Kaunissaare Reservoir
- Vaskjala Reservoir
- Lake Ülemiste
- List of lakes of Estonia
