= Vaskjala Reservoir =

Reservoir in Harju County, Estonia

- Vaskjala veehoidla (Estonian)
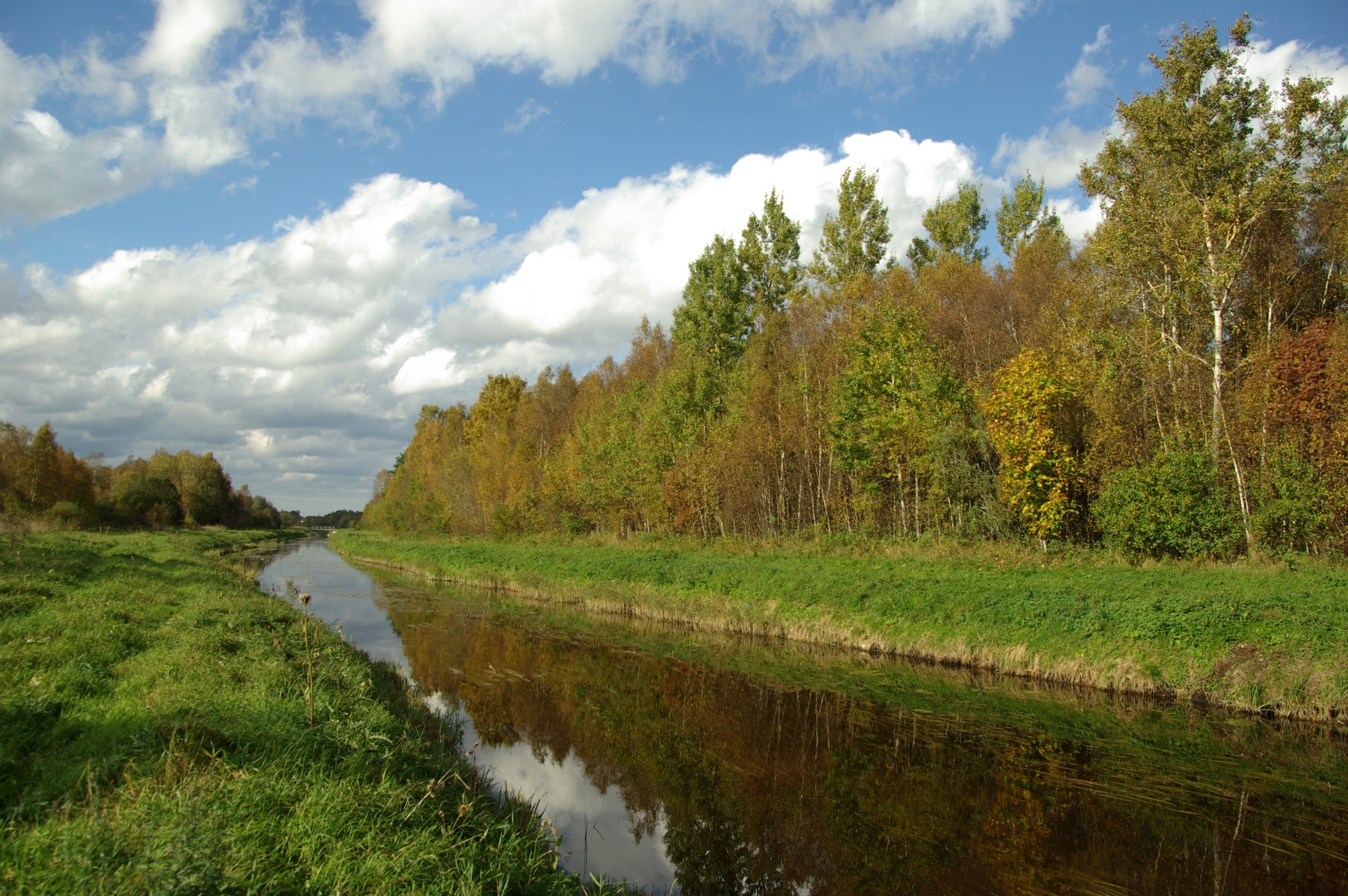
- Vaskjala-Ülemiste Canal in Rae rural municipality, Rae village

- Location within Estonia
- Location: Rae Parish, Harju County, Estonia
- Coordinates: 59.3522°N 24.9428°E
- Type: Reservoir
- Part of: Tallinn water supply system
- Primary inflows: Pirita River
- Primary outflows: Pirita River, Vaskjala-Ülemiste Canal
- Catchment area: 637.7 square kilometers (246.2 sq mi)
- Basin countries: Estonia
- Managing agency: Tallinna Vesi
- Built: 1969
- First flooded: 1970
- Max. length: 2,130 meters (6,990 ft)
- Max. width: 200 meters (660 ft)
- Surface area: 27.6 hectares (68 acres)
- Average depth: 1.1 meters (3 ft 7 in)
- Max. depth: 4.3 meters (14 ft)
- Water volume: 730,000 cubic meters (26,000,000 cu ft)
- Shore length^{1}: 8,580 meters (28,150 ft)
- Surface elevation: 38.8 meters (127 ft)
- Islands: 5
- Settlements: Jüri, Vaskjala
- ^{1} Shore length is not a well-defined measure.

The Vaskjala Reservoir (Estonian: Vaskjala veehoidla) is a lake in Estonia. It is located on the Pirita River in the village of Vaskjala in Rae Parish, Harju County, near Jüri.

The reservoir is part of the Tallinn water supply system and is connected to Lake Ülemiste via the Vaskjala–Ülemiste Canal.

== Physical description ==
The lake has an area of 27.6 hectares (68 acres), and it has five islands with a combined area of 0.6 hectares (1.5 acres). The lake has an average depth of 1.1 meters (3 ft 7 in) and a maximum depth of 4.3 meters (14 ft). It is 2,130 meters (6,990 ft) long, and its shoreline measures 8,580 meters (28,150 ft). It has a volume of 730,000 cubic meters (26,000,000 cu ft).

== History ==
The construction of the reservoir took place in 1969 and 1970. Vaskjala beach was built on the shores of the reservoir in 1999.

== See also ==
- Soodla Reservoir
- Raudoja Reservoir
- Aavoja Reservoir
- Kaunissaare Reservoir
- Paunküla Reservoir
- Lake Ülemiste
- List of lakes of Estonia
