= Kaunissaare =

Village in Harju County, Estonia

Kaunissaare Kaunisaar
- Village
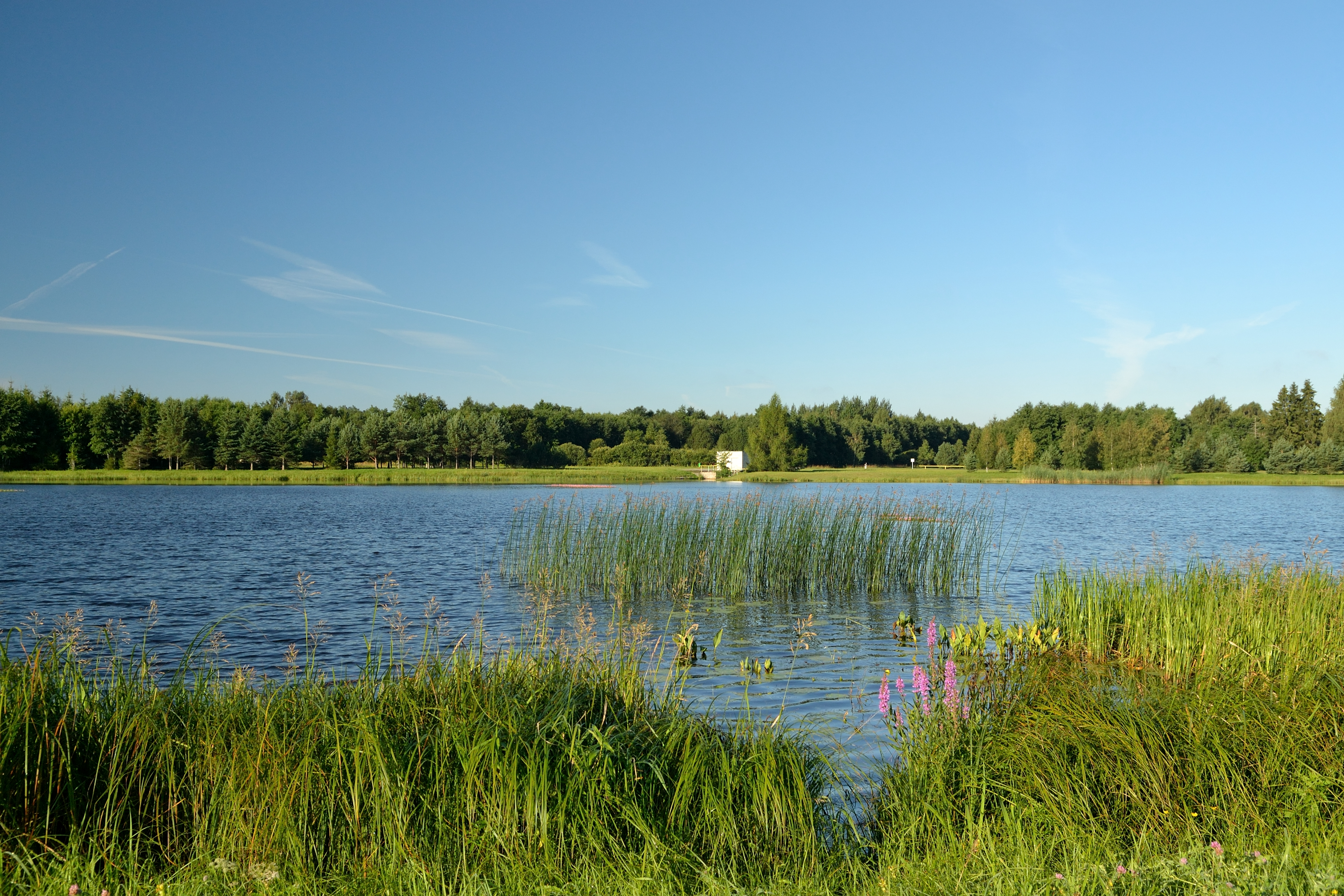
- Kaunissaare reservoir on Jägala River.

- Location in Estonia
- Coordinates: 59°18′26″N 25°21′19″E
- Country: Estonia
- County: Harju County
- Municipality: Anija Parish
- First historical record: 1326

Area
  - Total: 19.9 km^{2} (7.7 sq mi)
- Highest elevation: 57 m (187 ft)
- Lowest elevation: 44.5 m (146 ft)

Population (2020)
  - Total: 89
  - Density: 4.5/km^{2} (12/sq mi)

Ethnicity (2011)
  - estonians: 97.5%
  - other: 2.5%
- Time zone: UTC+2 (EET)
  - Summer (DST): UTC+3 (EEST)
- Postal Codes: 74309

Kaunissaare is a village in Anija Parish, Harju County, Estonia, south and south-east of the town of Kehra, situated around the Kaunissaare reservoir, on the banks of the Jägala river.

As of August 1, 2020, the village has a population of 89.

== History ==
Kaunissaare manor (Latin: Curia nostra Kaunizaar) was first mentioned in 1326 but it disappeared in the following centuries. The manor's mill is known to have been operating until the manor was re-established in 1815 as a half-manor. The manor's main building burnt down in 1945. Several other buildings that belonged to the manor complex were destroyed and flooded in the beginning of 1980's, when the reservoir was being built on the Jägala river. The reservoir is part of the Tallinn water supply system and is connected via canals to Pirita, Aavoja and Soodla rivers. The node was opened in 1984. Kaunissaare fish passage was built in 2015.

== Gallery ==
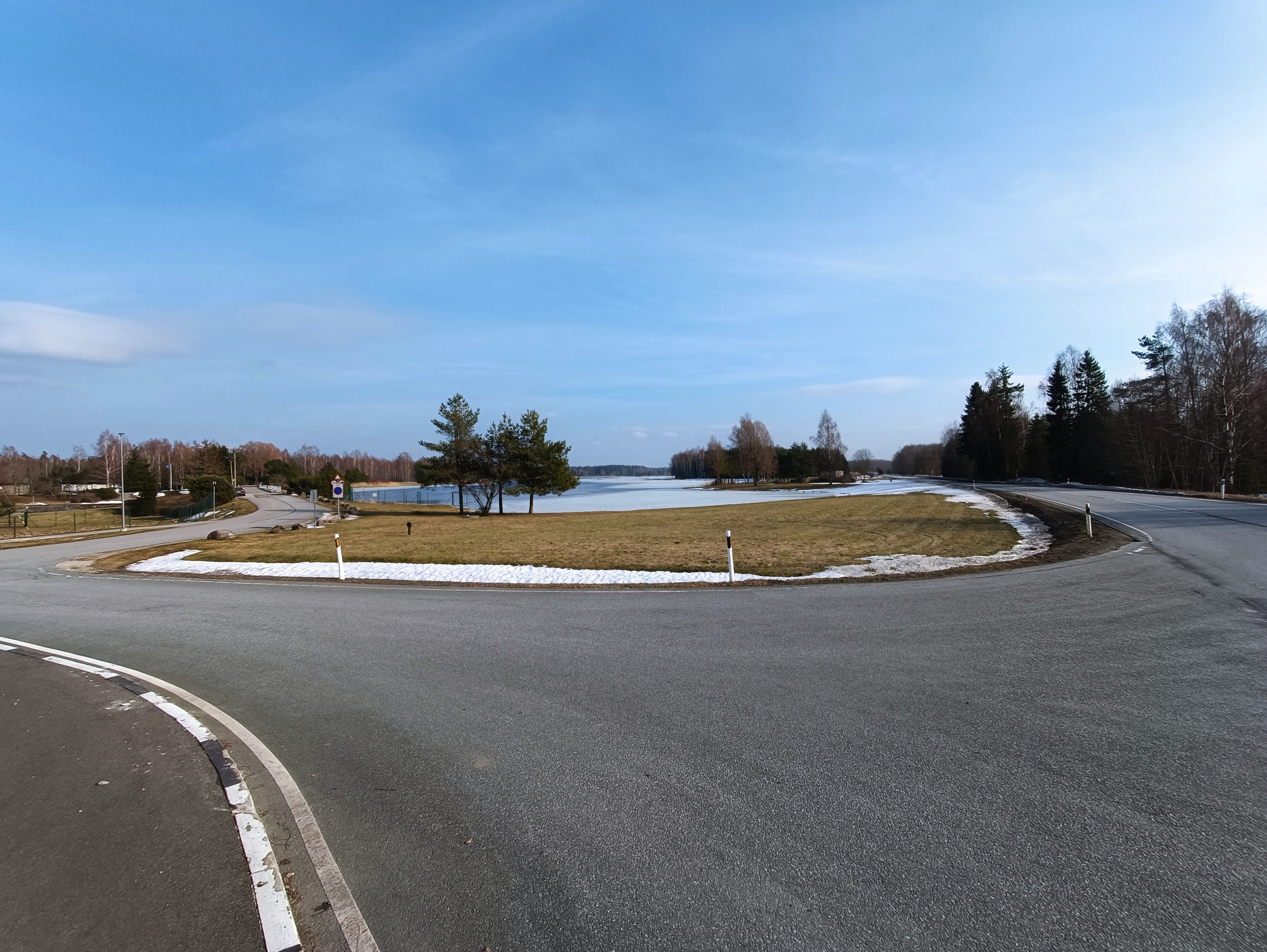
Intersection west of Kaunissaare reservoir
