= Koila (disambiguation) =

Koila may refer to several places:

- Koila, village in Karnataka, India
- Koila, Harju County, village in Jõelähtme Parish, Harju County, Estonia
- Koila, Väike-Maarja Parish, village in Väike-Maarja Parish, Lääne-Viru County, Estonia
- Koila, Viru-Nigula Parish, village in Viru-Nigula Parish, Lääne-Viru County, Estonia
- Koila (Arcadia), an ancient town of Arcadia, Greece
- Koila, Kozani, village in the municipality of Kozani, Greece
