= Coila =

Coila may refer to:

- Coila (muse), associated with Robert Burns

== Geography ==
- Coila (Arcadia), a town of ancient Arcadia, Greece
- Coila, Mississippi, a community in the United States
- Coila Creek, a stream in Mississippi
- Kyle, Ayrshire, Scotland
