= Pirita River Valley Landscape Conservation Area =

Protected area in Estonia

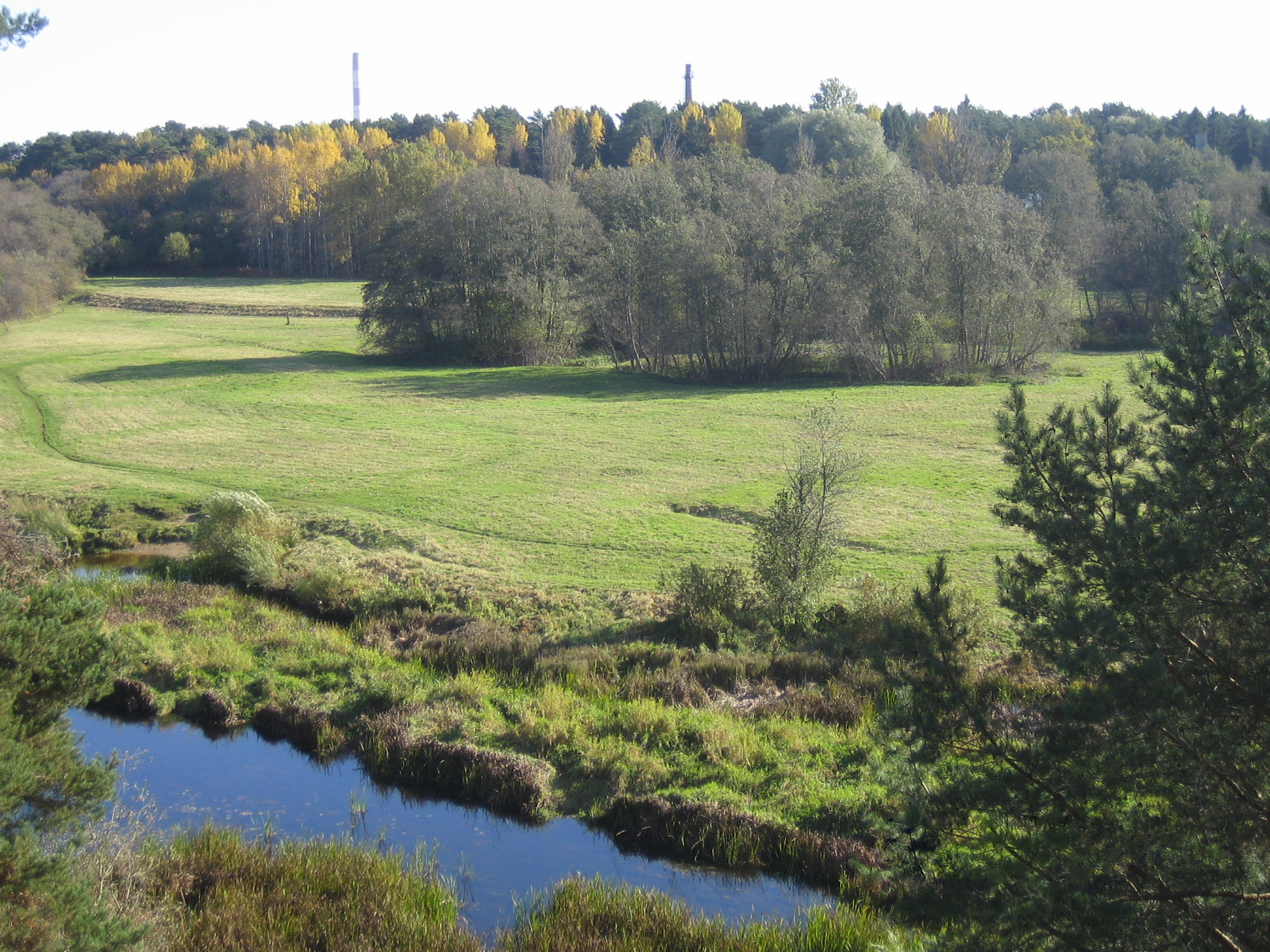

- Location within Estonia
- Location: Estonia
- Coordinates: 59°28′N 24°52′E
- Area: 707 ha (1,750 acres)
- Established: 1957 (1999)

Pirita River Valley Landscape Conservation Area is a nature park which is located in Harju County, Estonia.

The area of the nature park is 707 ha.

The protected area was founded in 1957 to protect the Pirita River's valley at its middle course. In 1999, the protected area was designated to the landscape conservation area.
