= Manniva =

Village in Estonia

Coordinates: 59°28′N 25°08′E

- Village
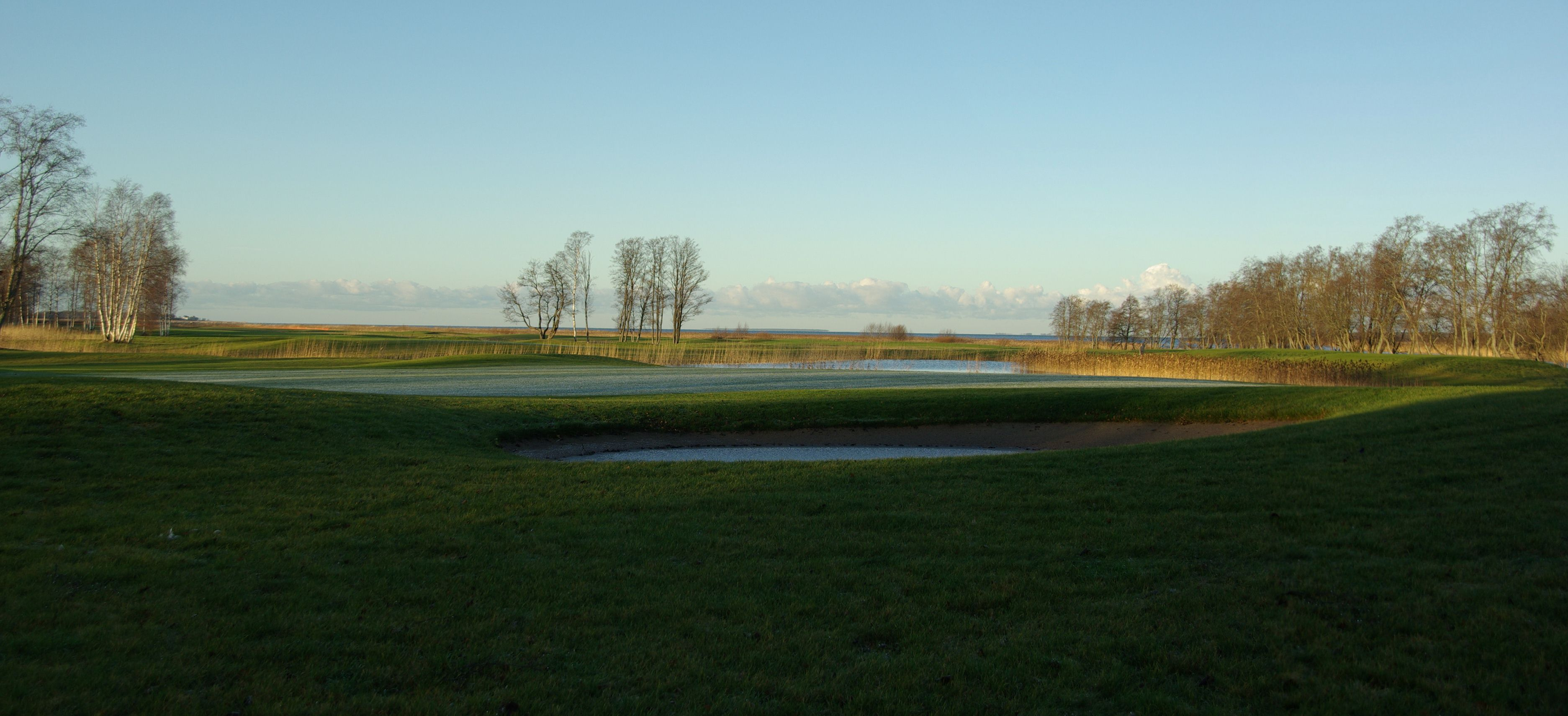
- Interactive map of Manniva
- Country: Estonia
- County: Harju County
- Parish: Jõelähtme Parish

Population (2011)
  - Total: 66
- Time zone: UTC+2 (EET)
  - Summer (DST): UTC+3 (EEST)

Manniva is a village in Jõelähtme Parish, Harju County in northern Estonia. It's located west of the mouth of the Jägala River to the Ihasalu Bay (part of the Gulf of Finland), and about 7 km (4 mi) east of the town of Maardu.

Manniva had a population of 39 in 2001, 47 in 2009, and as of 2011, 66 people lived in the village.

== Gallery ==
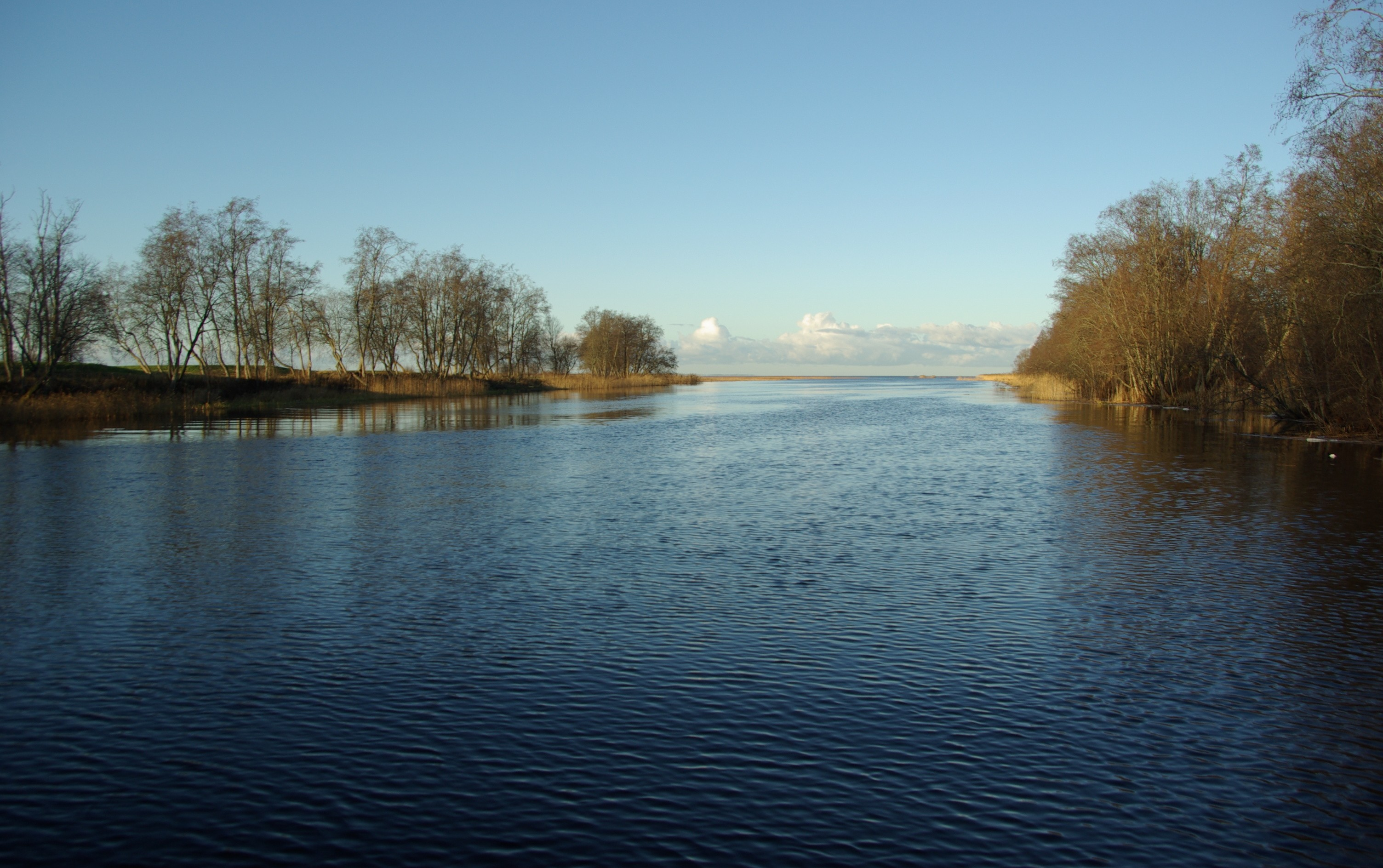
The mouth of Jägala River
