= Ambla (river) =

River in Estonia

Ambla River
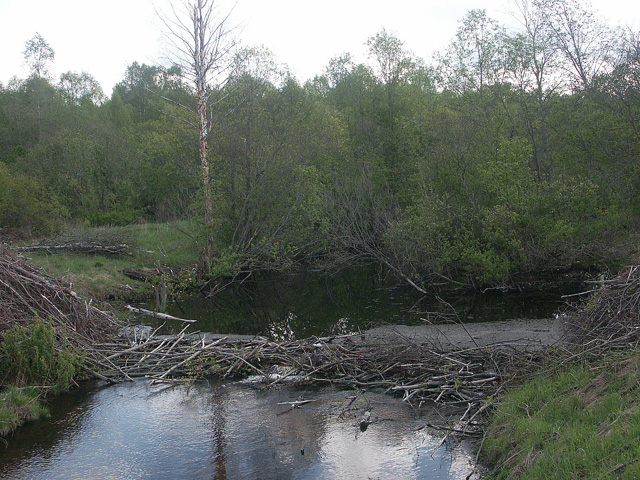

Location
- Country: Estonia

Physical characteristics
- Mouth: Jägala River
  - coordinates: 59°07′20″N 25°33′06″E
- Length: 27.9 km
- Basin size: 157.7 km²

The Ambla River is a river in Järva County, Estonia. The river is 27.9 km long and its basin size is 157.7 km^{2}. It runs from Lake Roosna into the Jägala River.
