= Härjapea =

River in Tallinn, Estonia

Coordinates: 59°26′5.13″N 24°45′37.42″E

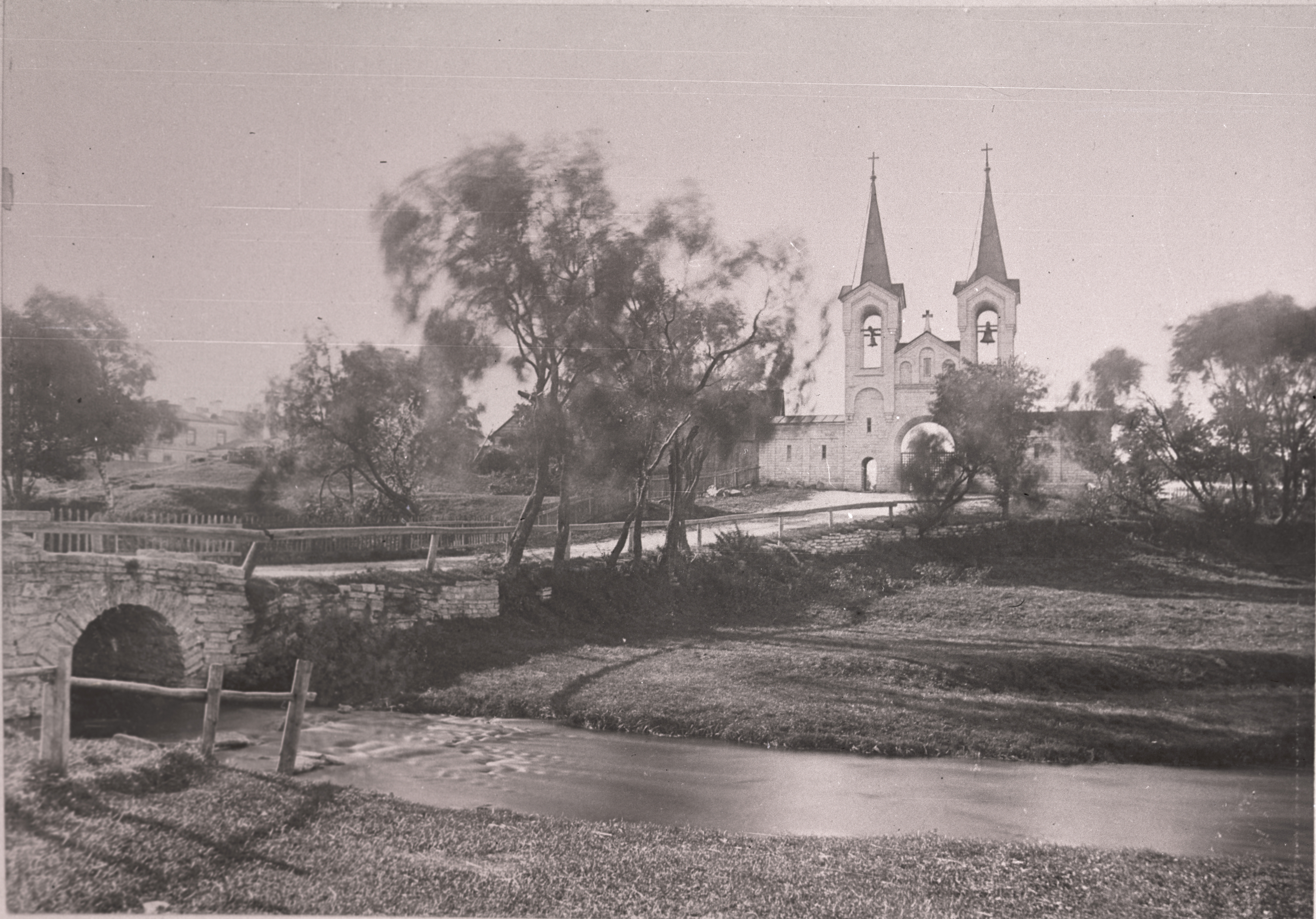
- The Härjapea in 1889

Location
- Country: Estonia

Physical characteristics
- Source
  - location: Lake Ülemiste
- Mouth
  - location: Tallinn Bay, Gulf of Finland

The Härjapea (Estonian: Härjapea jõgi, lit. oxhead) was a river in Tallinn, Estonia. The river was a few kilometres in length, flowing from Lake Ülemiste into Tallinn Bay.

The Härjapea was one of the most exploited rivers in Estonia in the Middle Ages. First, watermills were constructed in the 13th century. A map from the end of the 17th century depicts eight mills on the river, some of which later became the basis for larger industries. Due to the growth of industry in the 19th century, the river became increasingly polluted and was then already partly covered. In 1923 it was covered with planks, and in 1938 the construction of an underground sewage pipe was completed in place of the river, which was around 4.5 km in length at the time.

Nowadays the course of the river is recognizable in some places, otherwise little else remains of it. The underground sewage channel is still operational.

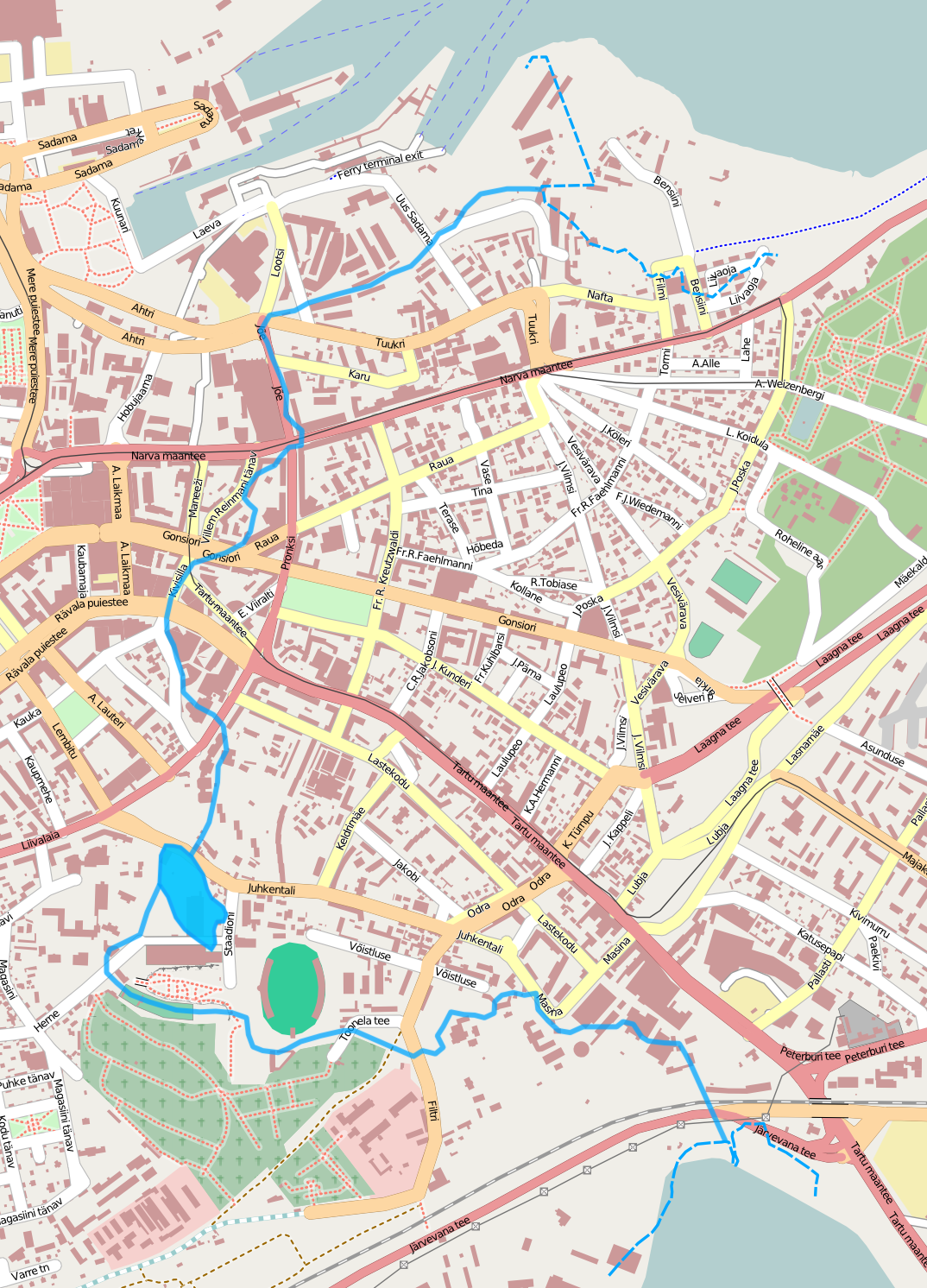
The course of the river in the end of 19th century shown on a map of modern Tallinn
