= Koila, Harju County =

Village in Estonia

Coordinates: 59°27′06″N 25°09′50″E

Koila, Estonia
- Village
- Interactive map of Koila, Estonia
- Country: Estonia
- County: Harju County
- Parish: Jõelähtme Parish
- Time zone: UTC+2 (EET)
  - Summer (DST): UTC+3 (EEST)

Koila is a village in Jõelähtme Parish, Harju County in northern Estonia. It's lies on the left bank of the Jägala River.

== Gallery ==
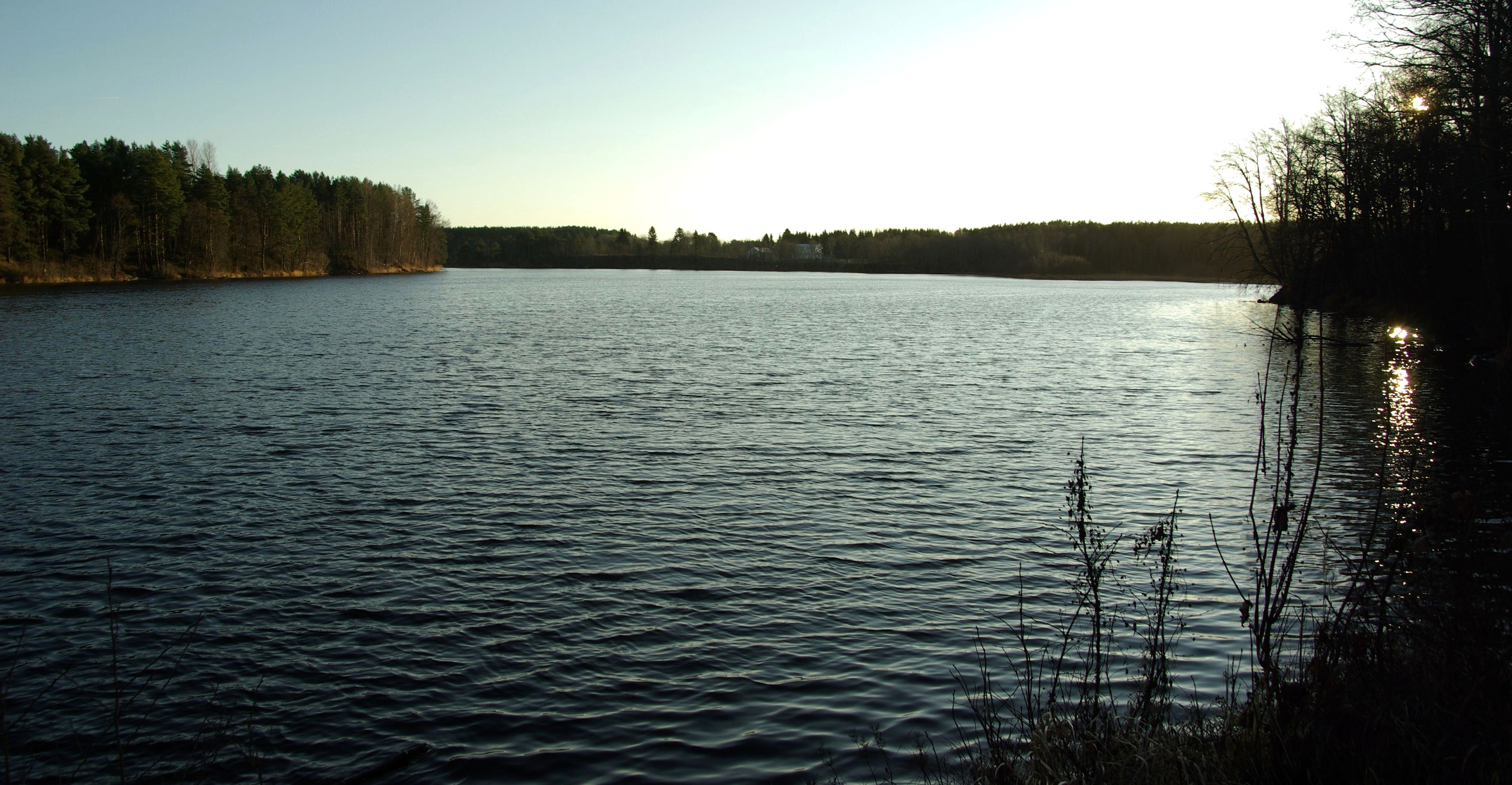
Linnamäe impounded lake on Jägala River.
