= Tuhala (river) =

River in Estonia

Coordinates: 59.2511°N 24.9546°E

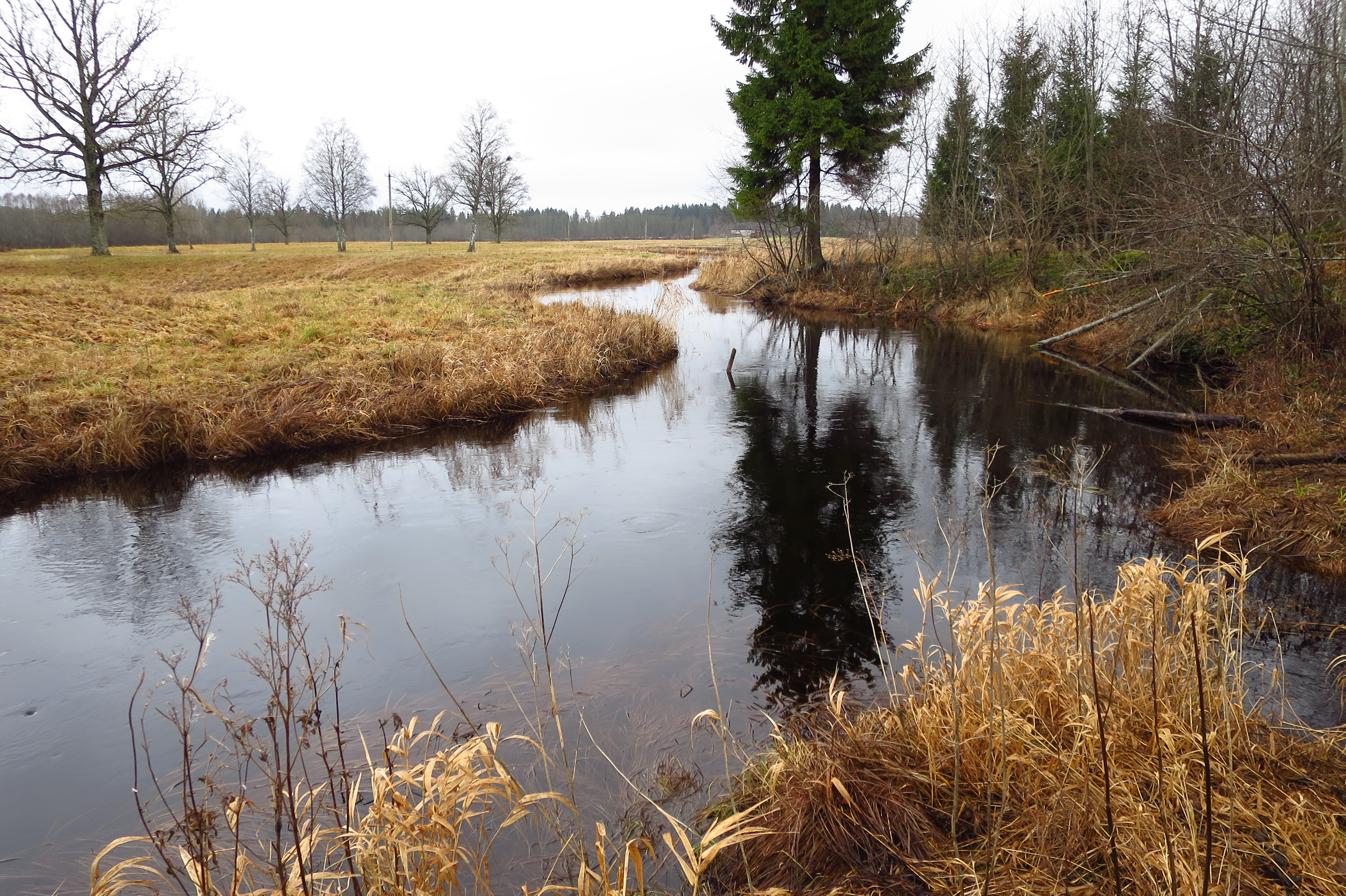

Location
- Country: Estonia

Physical characteristics
- Source
  - location: Mahtra Marsh
- Mouth
  - location: Pirita
- Length: 26 km (16 mi)
- Basin size: 112 km^{2} (43 sq mi)

The Tuhala is a river in northern Estonia. Its source is the Mahtra Marsh, and it discharges into the Pirita River. It has a length of 26 km. The catchment area of the river is 112 km^{2}. The village of Tuhala lies along the river.

== Sources ==
- Info in eestigiid.ee (in Estonian)
