= Kuivajõgi =

River in Estonia

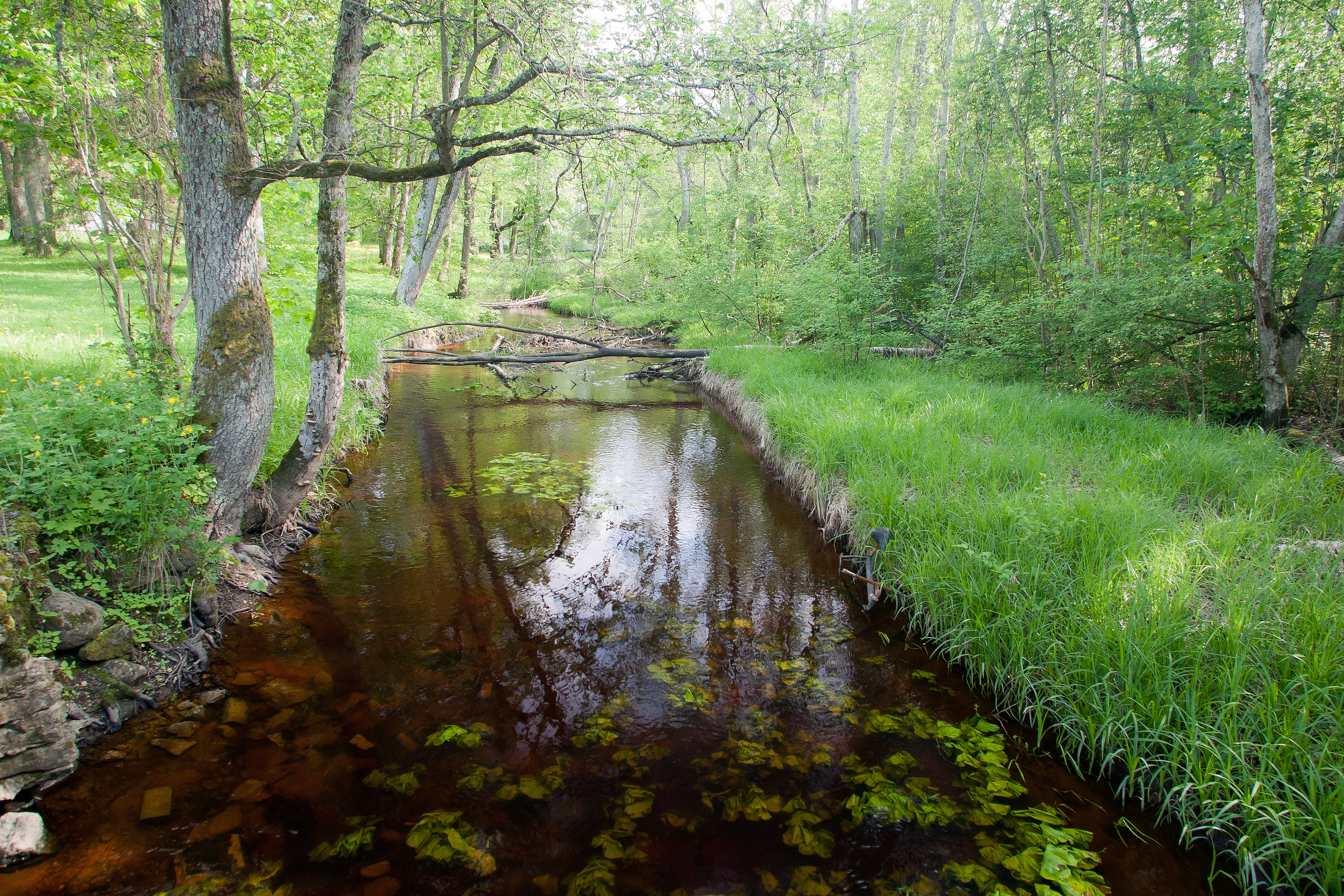
- The Kuivajõgi (May 2014)

Location
- Country: Estonia

Physical characteristics
- Source
  - location: Pususoo
- Mouth: Pirita
  - location: near Kose-Uuemõisa
  - coordinates: 59°12′29″N 25°05′28″E
- Length: 35 km
- Basin size: 163,8 km²

The Kuivajõgi is river in Estonia in Harju County. The river is 35 km long. It runs from Pususoo to the Pirita River.

Some parts of the Kuivajõgi are protected as the Kuivajõe Bed Reserve (Estonian: Kuivajõe sängi kaitseala).

== See also ==
- List of rivers of Estonia
