= Kiruvere =

Village in Estonia

Coordinates: 59°08′N 25°21′E

- Village
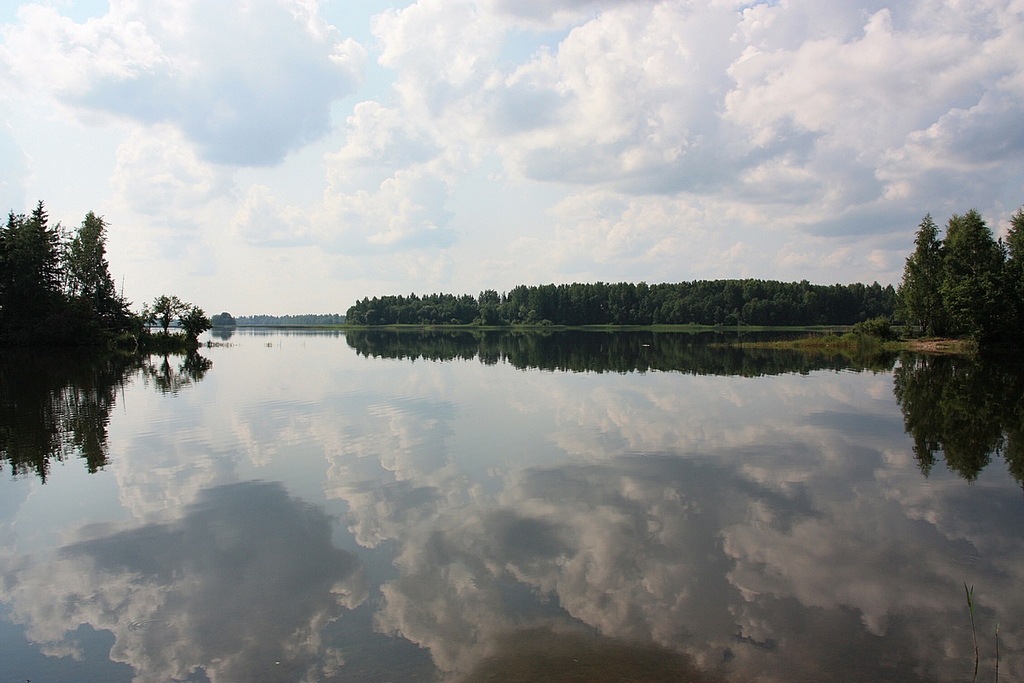
- Interactive map of Kiruvere
- Country: Estonia
- County: Harju County
- Municipality: Kose Parish

Area
  - Total: 27.9 km^{2} (10.8 sq mi)

Population (2020)
  - Total: 28
- Time zone: UTC+2 (EET)
  - Summer (DST): UTC+3 (EEST)

Kiruvere is a village in Kose Parish, Harju County, northern Estonia. It was a part of Kõue Parish before 2013.
