= Ardu, Estonia =

Borough in Estonia

Coordinates: 59°06′N 25°22′E

Ardu
- Small borough
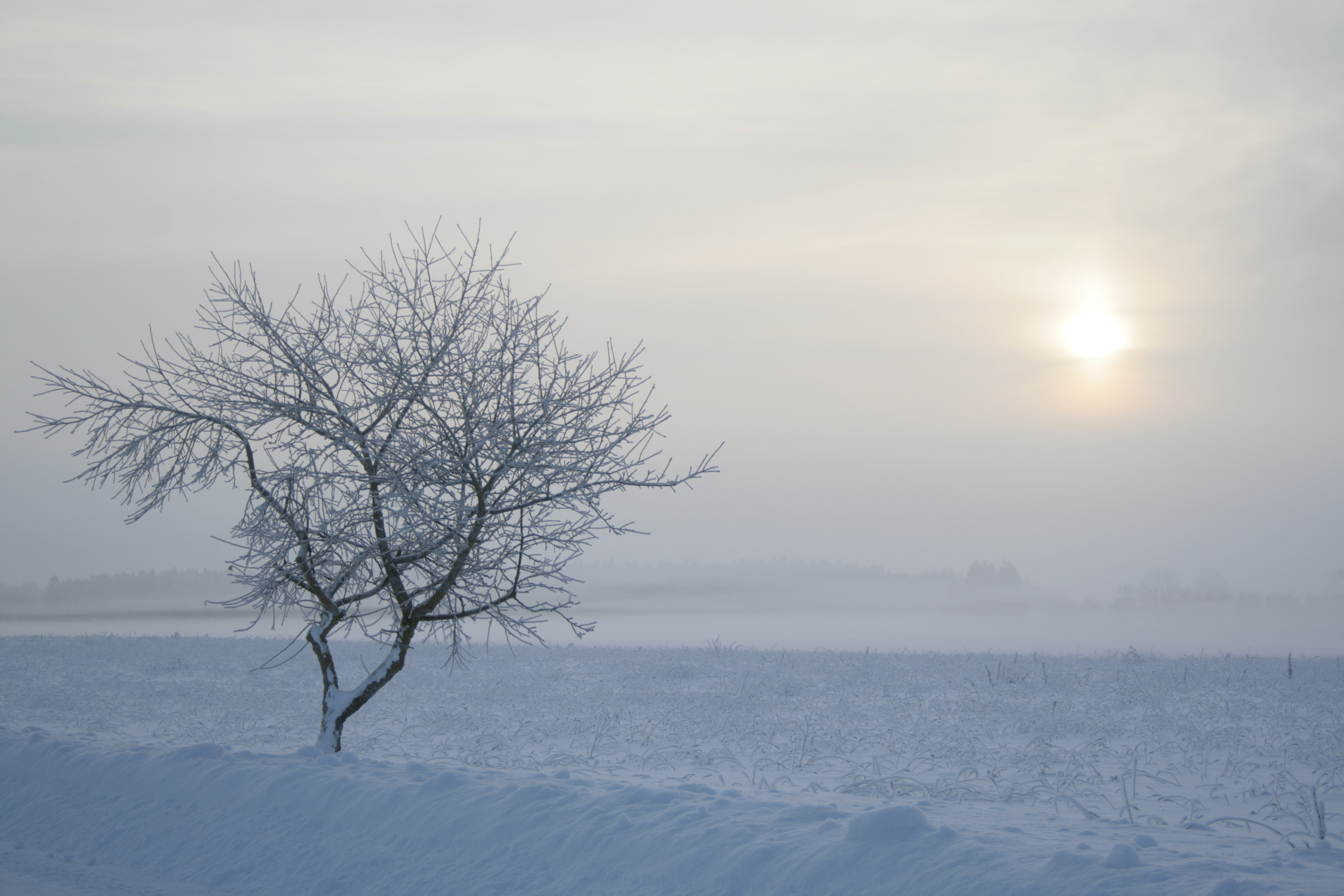
- Interactive map of Ardu
- Country: Estonia
- County: Harju County
- Municipality: Kose Parish

Area
  - Total: 5.8 km^{2} (2.2 sq mi)

Population (2020)
  - Total: 471
- Time zone: UTC+2 (EET)
  - Summer (DST): UTC+3 (EEST)

Ardu is a small borough (Estonian: alevik) in Kose Parish, Harju County, northern Estonia.
