= Vaskjala =

Village in Estonia

- village
- Location in Estonia
- Coordinates: 59°21′37″N 24°56′51″E
- Country: Estonia
- County: Harju County
- Municipality: Rae Parish

Population (01.01.2010)
  - Total: 591

Vaskjala is a village in Rae Parish, Harju County, in northern Estonia. It has a population of 591 (as of 1 January 2010).

== Population ==
Year	1959	1970	1979	1989	1996	2003	2008	2009
Population	226	304	316	254	274	297	492	549

== See also ==
- Vaskjala Reservoir
- Vaskjala–Ülemiste canal
