= Coila Creek =

Stream in Mississippi, U.S.

Coordinates: 33.3665120°N 90.0995284°W

Coila Creek is a stream in the U.S. state of Mississippi.

Coila Creek is a name derived from the Choctaw language purported to mean either "dead panther" or "panther comes there". A variant name is "Coa-i-ille Creek".
