= Aavoja =

River in Estonia

Aavoja Kehra oja, Pillapalu peakraav

Location
- Country: Estonia
- County: Harju
- Parish: Anija

Physical characteristics
- Source: near Koitjärve Bog in Pillapalu
  - coordinates: 59°21′22″N 25°38′7″E
  - elevation: 67.5 m (221 ft)
- Mouth: Jägala River near Kehra
  - coordinates: 59°20′15″N 25°20′48″E
  - elevation: 44.5 m (146 ft)
- Length: 22.1 km (13.7 mi)
- Basin size: 69.1 km^{2} (26.7 sq mi)
- Discharge
  - location: before Aavoja Reservoir
  - average: 1 m^{3}/s (35 cu ft/s)

Basin features
- Progression: Jägala River → Gulf of Finland
- Tributaries
  - left: Verioja
  - right: Aruoja, Raudoja-Aavoja Canal

The Aavoja is a 22.1 km (13.7 mi) long river in Anija Parish, Harju County, Estonia that flows into the Jägala River near Kehra.

The current source is located in the village of Pillapalu, just south of Koitjärve Bog. The upstream part of the river was dug in the 1930s to drain Aguparra Bog.

Väike-Aavoja and Aavoja reservoirs are located on the river. The river is part of the Tallinn water supply system. The basin area of the river is 69.1 km^{2} (26.7 mi^{2}).
