= Coila (Arcadia) =

Town in ancient Arcadia

Coila or Koila (Ancient Greek: Κοίλα) was a town in ancient Arcadia. It is mentioned in an inscription at Delphi, dated near the end of the fifth century or the beginning of the fourth century BCE, regarding the appointment of a theorodokos of Coila.

Its exact location is unknown.
