= Pirita (river) =

River in Estonia

Coordinates: 59°27′52.27″N 24°50′6.24″E

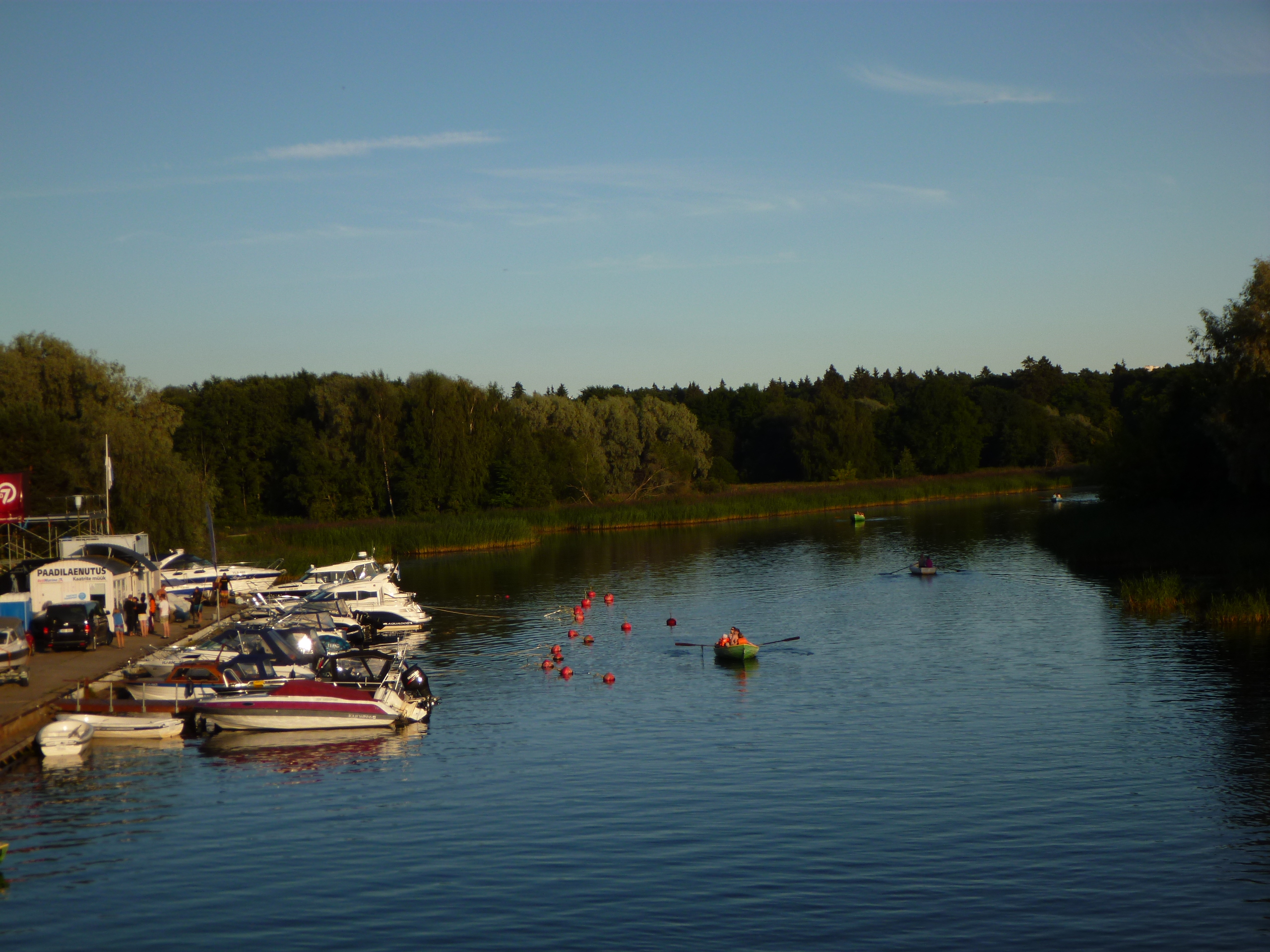
- The Pirita River near its mouth in Pirita, Tallinn

Location
- Country: Estonia

Physical characteristics
- Source
  - location: Pususoo, Järva County
  - elevation: 75 m (246 ft)
- Mouth
  - location: Tallinn Bay, Gulf of Finland, Baltic Sea
- Length: 105 km (65 mi)
- Basin size: 799 km^{2} (308 sq mi)
- Discharge
  - average: 8 m^{3}/s (280 cu ft/s)

Basin features
- Tributaries
  - left: Kuivajõgi, Tuhala
  - right: Leivajõgi

The Pirita (Estonian: Pirita jõgi) is a 105 km (65 mi) long river in northern Estonia that drains into the Gulf of Finland of the Baltic Sea in the Pirita district of the capital city Tallinn. The basin area of the river is 799 km^{2}.

As part of the Tallinn water supply system, the Pirita is impounded into the Paunküla and Vaskjala reservoirs. The reservoir in Vaskjala is connected over a canal to the Lake Ülemiste in Tallinn, where the Ülemiste Water Treatment Plant is situated. Additional water is directed to the Pirita from the Jägala, Soodla, and Pärnu rivers through a canal network that joins the Pirita in Veskitaguse.

During the 1980 Summer Olympics, the estuary of the Pirita River and adjacent Tallinn Bay hosted the sailing events.

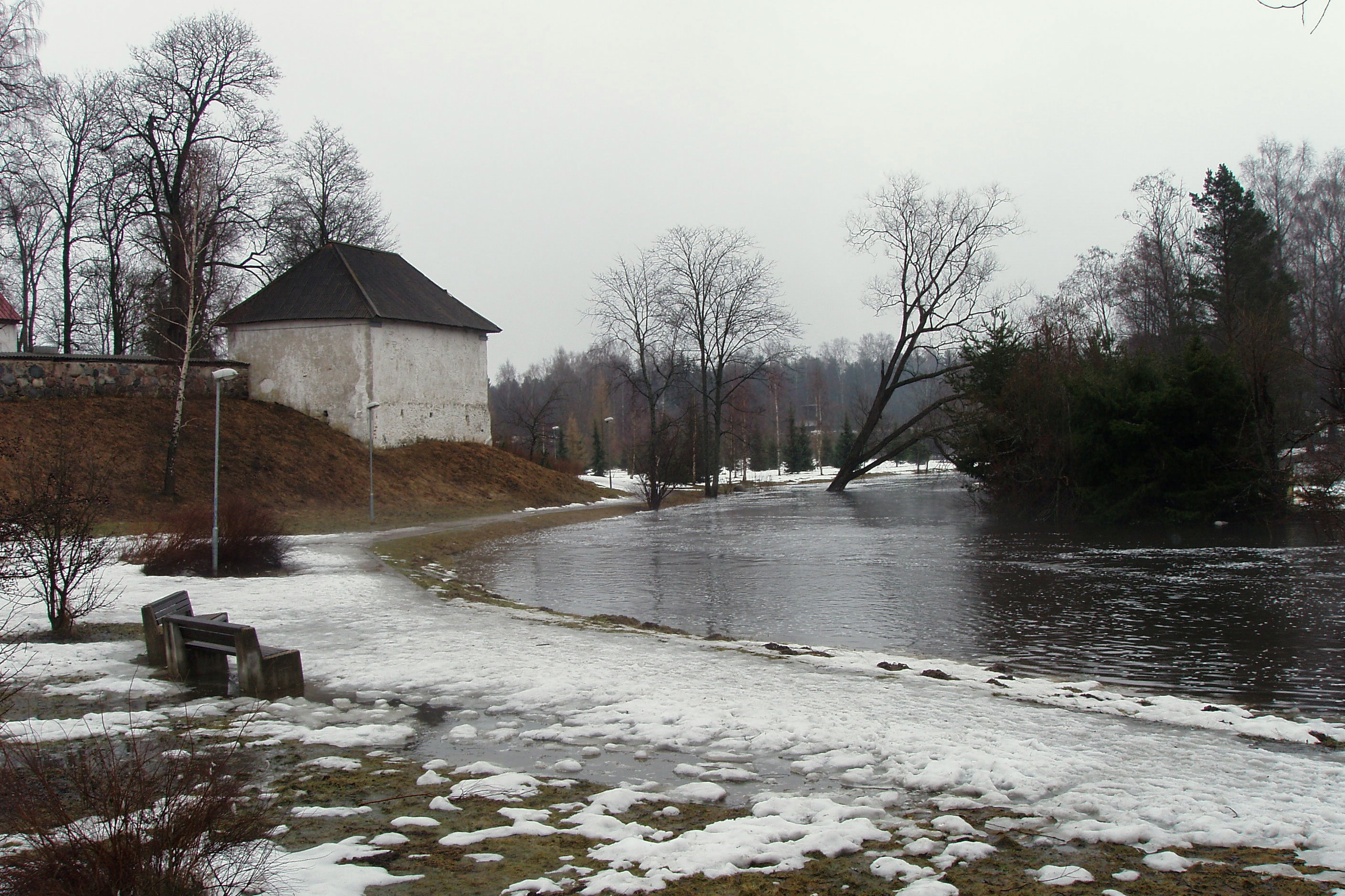
Spring flooding on the headwaters in Kose

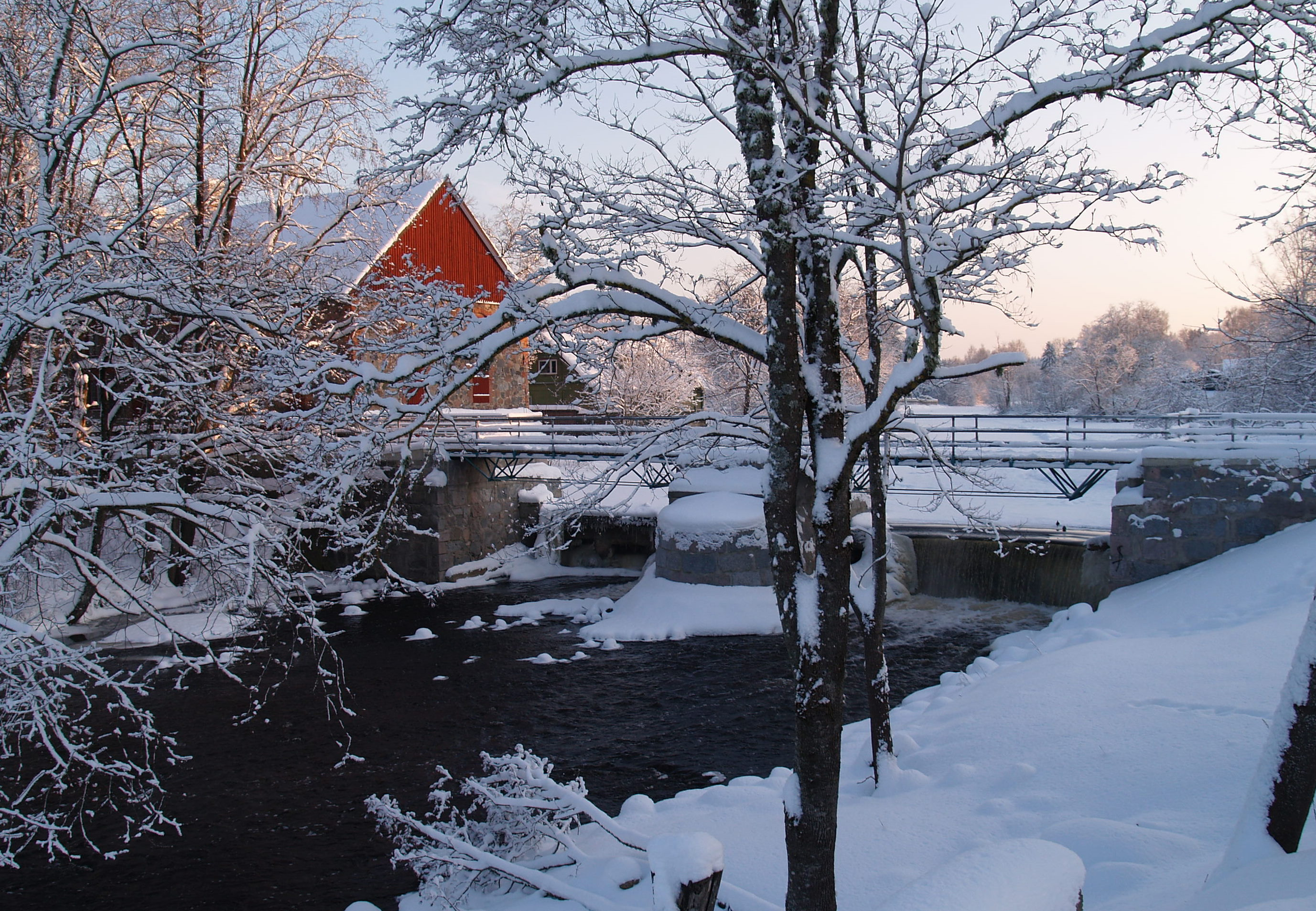
Pedestrian bridge in Kose

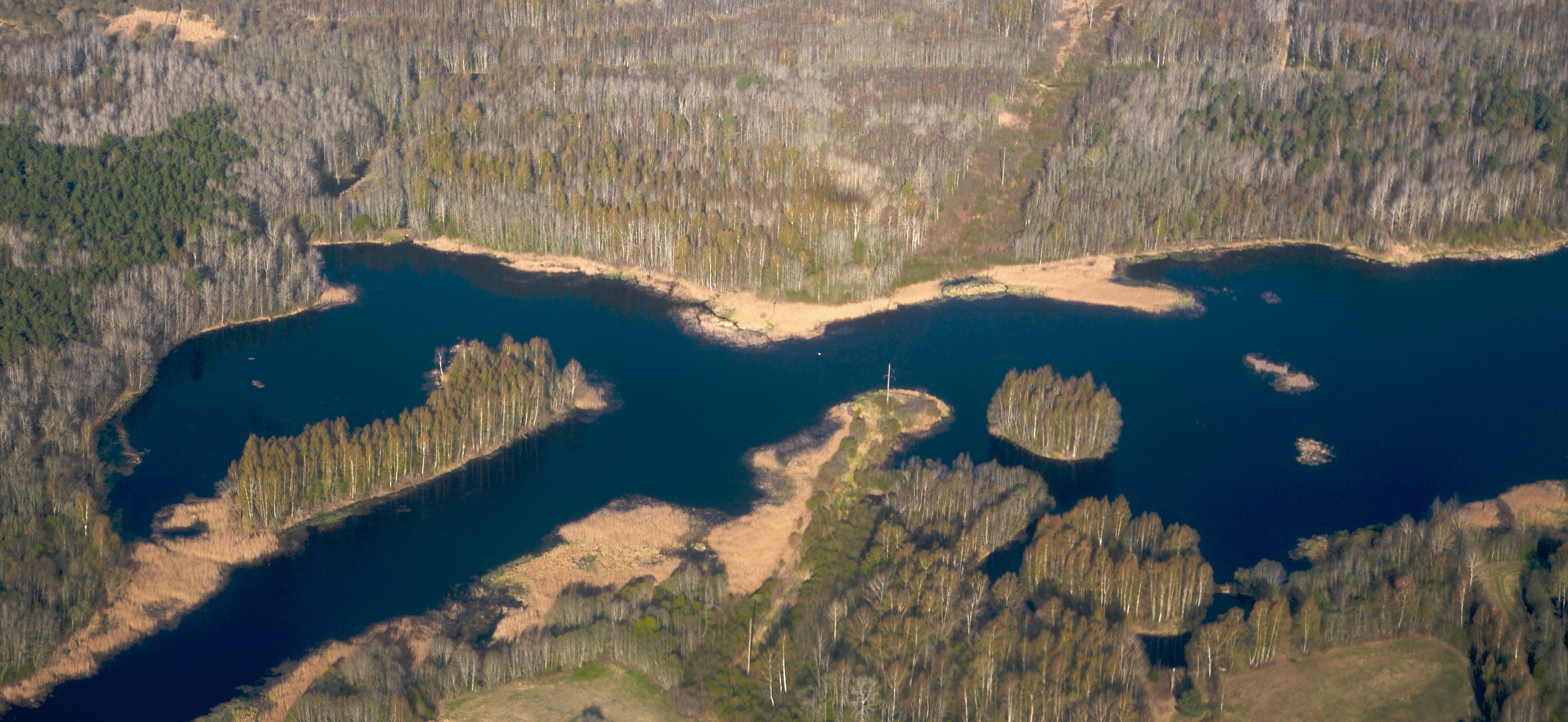
Aerial view of the Pirita near Jüri

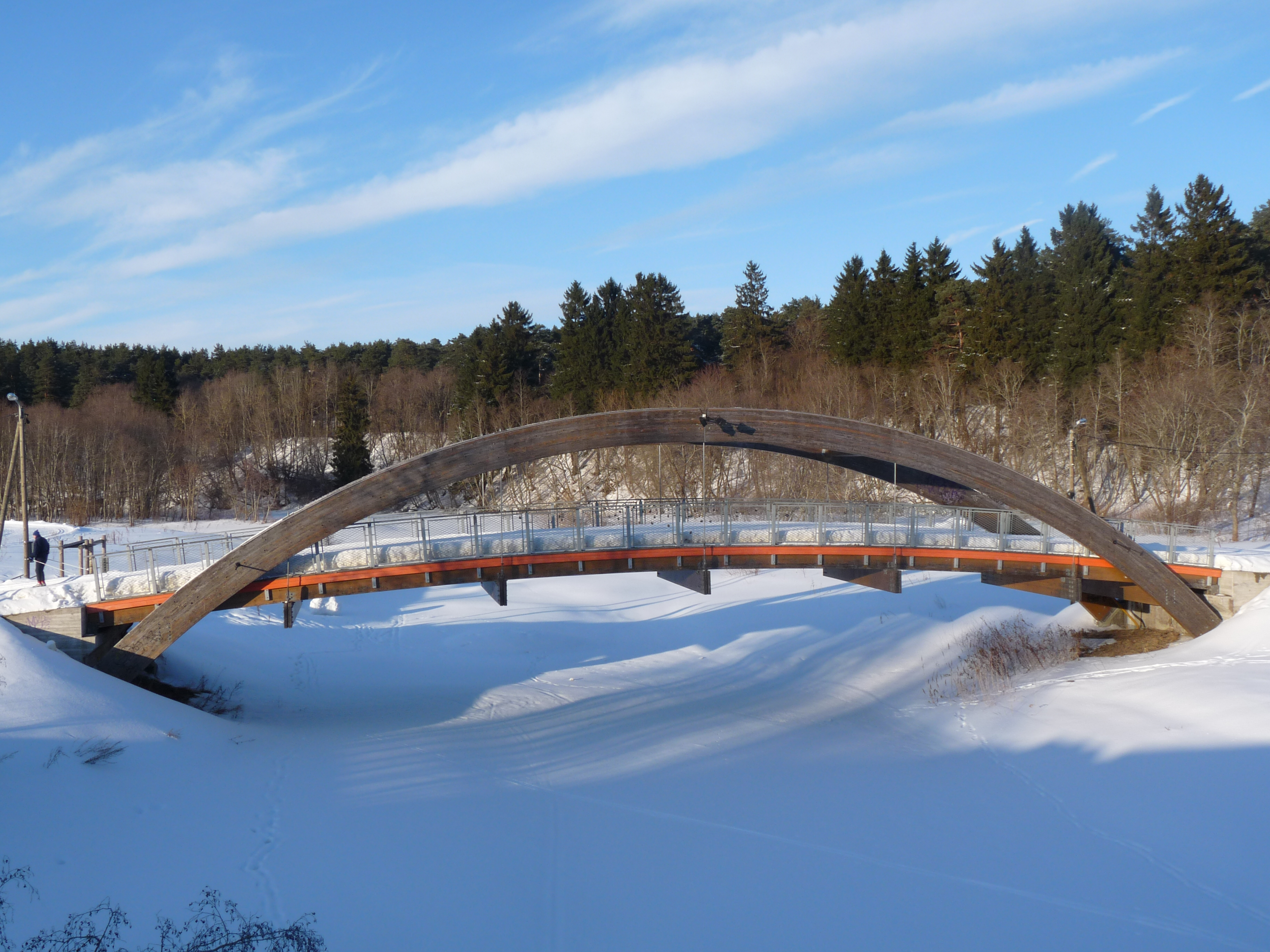
Arch bridge over the frozen Pirita in winter in Kose
