= Lake Ülemiste =

Lake in Tallinn, Estonia

- Ülemiste järv (Estonian)
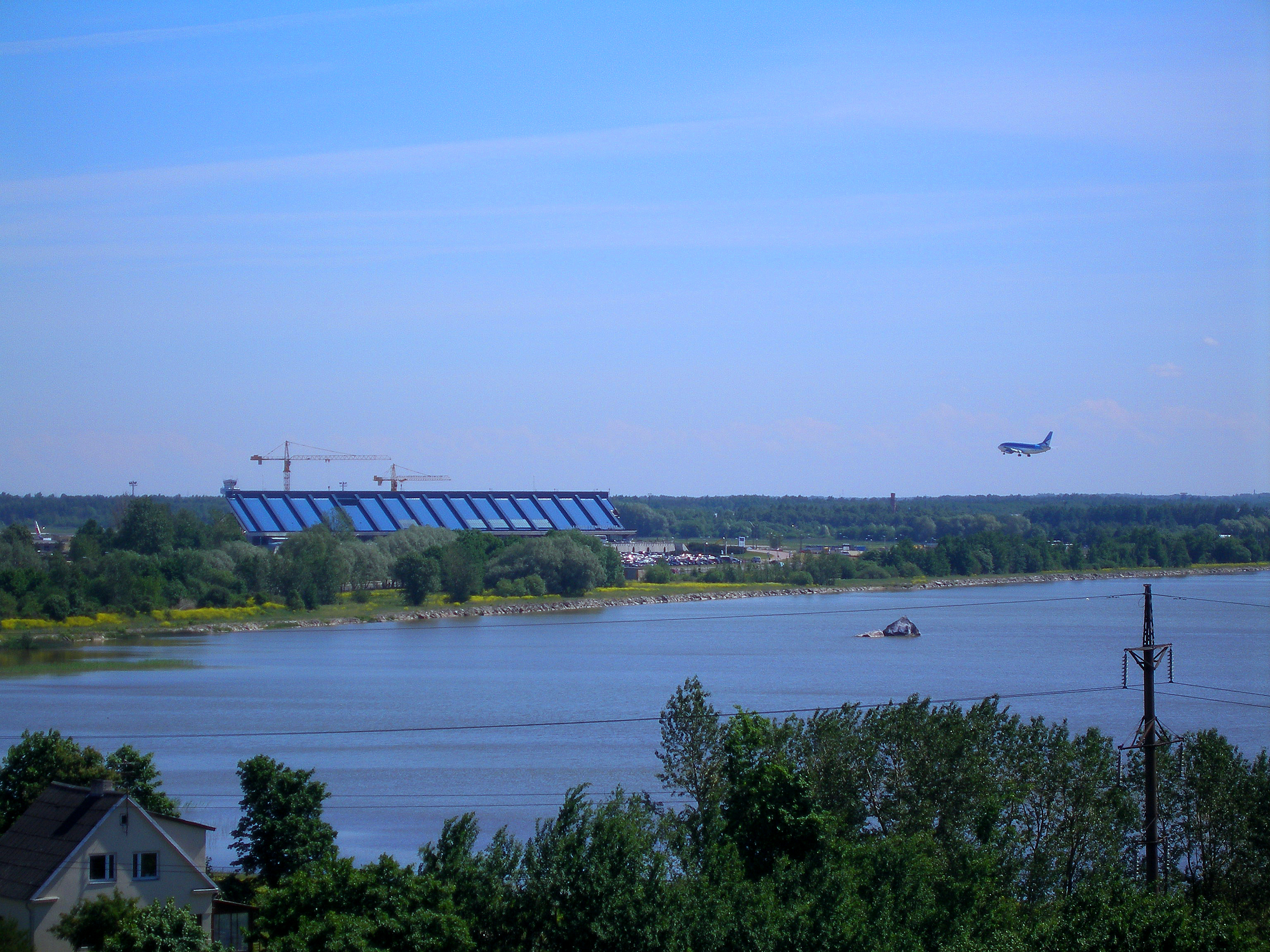

- Location within Estonia
- Location: Kesklinn, Tallinn
- Coordinates: 59°24′N 24°46′E
- Lake type: Eutrophic
- Primary inflows: Vaskjala–Ülemiste canal (from Pirita River), Kurna Creek, Ruunaoja Creek
- Primary outflows: Tallinn water system; historically Härjapea River
- Catchment area: 99.24 km^{2} (38.32 sq mi)
- Basin countries: Estonia
- Max. length: 4.1 km (2.5 mi)
- Max. width: 3.2 km (2.0 mi)
- Surface area: 9.436 km^{2} (3.643 sq mi)
- Average depth: 2.5 m (8.2 ft)
- Max. depth: 4.2 m (14 ft)
- Shore length^{1}: 15.219 km (9.5 mi)
- Surface elevation: 35.7 m (117 ft)
- Settlements: Tallinn
- ^{1} Shore length is not a well-defined measure.

Lake Ülemiste (Estonian: Ülemiste järv, also Järveküla järv, Mõigu järv, or Kuningajärv) is the largest of the lakes surrounding Tallinn, Estonia. Ülemiste is the main part of the Tallinn water supply system, which supplies the city with most of its drinking water. The lake is fed mostly by Kurna Creek and the Pirita River, through the Vaskjala–Ülemiste canal.

Lennart Meri Tallinn Airport is located on the eastern shore of the lake, and aircraft regularly take off and land over the lake. The airport maintains the necessary equipment ready to salvage in a short time any aircraft that crashes into the lake, as required by International Civil Aviation Organization regulations.

The Tallinn Water Company, AS Tallinna Vesi, has a treatment plant on the north shore of the lake which supplies 90% of the water to the city. The remaining 10% comes from ground water wells, which are maintained as a backup in case the lake becomes contaminated. On 18 March 2010, a DHL Antonov An-26 aircraft made an emergency landing on the ice of the lake, leaking about 1 ton of fuel. All of the pollution was eventually removed.

Administratively, Lake Ülemiste is part of Tallinn's central district Kesklinn, and constitutes Ülemistejärve subdistrict with its neighbouring forests. As of 1 January 2014, the population of the subdistrict is 203.

== Mythology and fiction ==
In the lake there is boulder called Lindakivi (Linda's Rock). In Estonian mythology, it is believed to be one of the boulders Linda was supposed to carry to Kalev's grave at Toompea, but which fell off her apron. She sat on the boulder and cried, thus creating the lake.

The mythological "Ülemiste Elder" (Estonian: Ülemiste vanake) is believed to live in the lake. If anyone should meet him, then he is believed to ask: "Is Tallinn ready yet?". If then the other person answered "yes", then he would flood the city, and so according to the myth, the necessary response is "No, there is much to be done yet".
