= Tallinna Vesi =

Company based in Tallinn, Estonia

Tallinna Vesi is an Estonian company which offers water supply, wastewater collection and treatment services. This company is the largest water utility company in Estonia. The company is serving over 460,000 people in Tallinn and Harju County.

The company is established in 1967 as Tallinn Water Works & Sewerage Management. Since 1997, the company bears the name AS Tallinna Vesi.

The privatization of Tallinn Water was finally approved (at the third discussion) by the Tallinn City Council on June 15, 2000, when Rein Voog was the chairman of the Tallinn City Council. International Water UU (owned by International Water and United Utilities International) became the owner of 50.4% of the shares, and the rest remained with the city of Tallinn.

Since 2005, the company is listed in Nasdaq Tallinn.

Since 2021, the company is majority-owned by the City of Tallinn with 55.06% of the shares. OÜ Utilitas owns 20.36%, while the rest (24.58%) is free float
