= Tallinn water supply system =

Tallinn water supply system is a water supply system that provides potable water to Estonia's capital city Tallinn.

90% of Tallinn's potable water is produced from the surface water. The heart of the system Ülemiste Water Treatment Plant is located in the centre of the city, beside the Lake Ülemiste. Because the natural catchment of the lake is quite small (52 km²), additional water is directed to Ülemiste via canals from Pirita, Jägala, Soodla and even from the upper stream of the Pärnu River in Pandivere Heights. The system includes 6 water reservoirs and 69 km of canals and pipelines, which makes the total area of the catchment 1865 km².

The remaining 10% of the water in Tallinn comes from 29 groundwater wells, mostly in the outskirts (Nõmme, Pirita, Kakumäe).
