= Soodla (river) =

River in Estonia

Soodla river
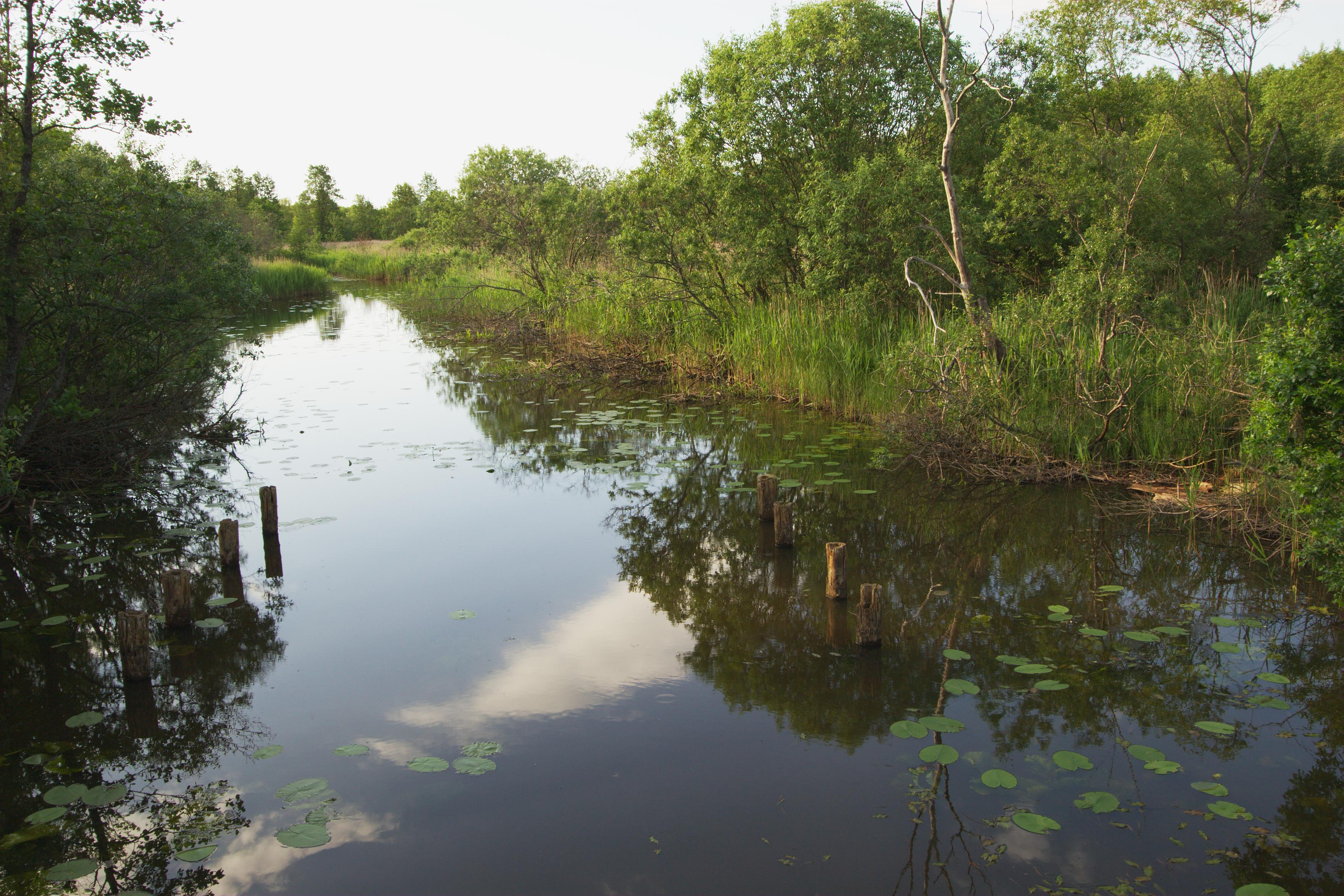
- The Soodla River (June 2006)

Location
- Country: Estonia

Physical characteristics
- Mouth: Jägala
  - location: West of Soodla
  - coordinates: 59°23′26″N 25°19′53″E
- Length: 72.6 km (45.1 mi)
- Basin size: 221.5 km^{2} (85.5 sq mi)

The Soodla is a river in Estonia in Harju and Lääne-Viru counties. The river is 72.6 km long, and its basin size is 221.5 km^{2}. It discharges into the Jägala River.

Trout and grayling live in the river.

== See also ==
- List of rivers of Estonia
