= List of canals of Estonia =

This is list of canals in Estonia. The list is incomplete.

Name	Length	Location (county, parish)	Further info	Image
Aavoja–Kaunissaare Canal	2.4 km	Harju County, Anija Parish		
Anne Canal		Tartu County, Tartu		
Jägala–Pirita Canal	25.1 km	Harju County, Anija, Raasiku, Rae Parishes		
Raudoja–Aavoja Canal	9 km	Harju County, Anija Parish		
Sae–Paunküla Canal	10.4 km	Harju County, Kose, Anija Parishes Järva County, Järva Parish		
Timmkanal	9.5 km	Pärnu County, Häädemeeste Parish		
Vaskjala–Ülemiste Canal	10.8 km	Harju County, Rae Parish and Tallinn	Basin area: 28,6 km²	
