= Jägala (river) =

River in Estonia

Jägala River Kehra jõgi, Kiigumõisa jõgi
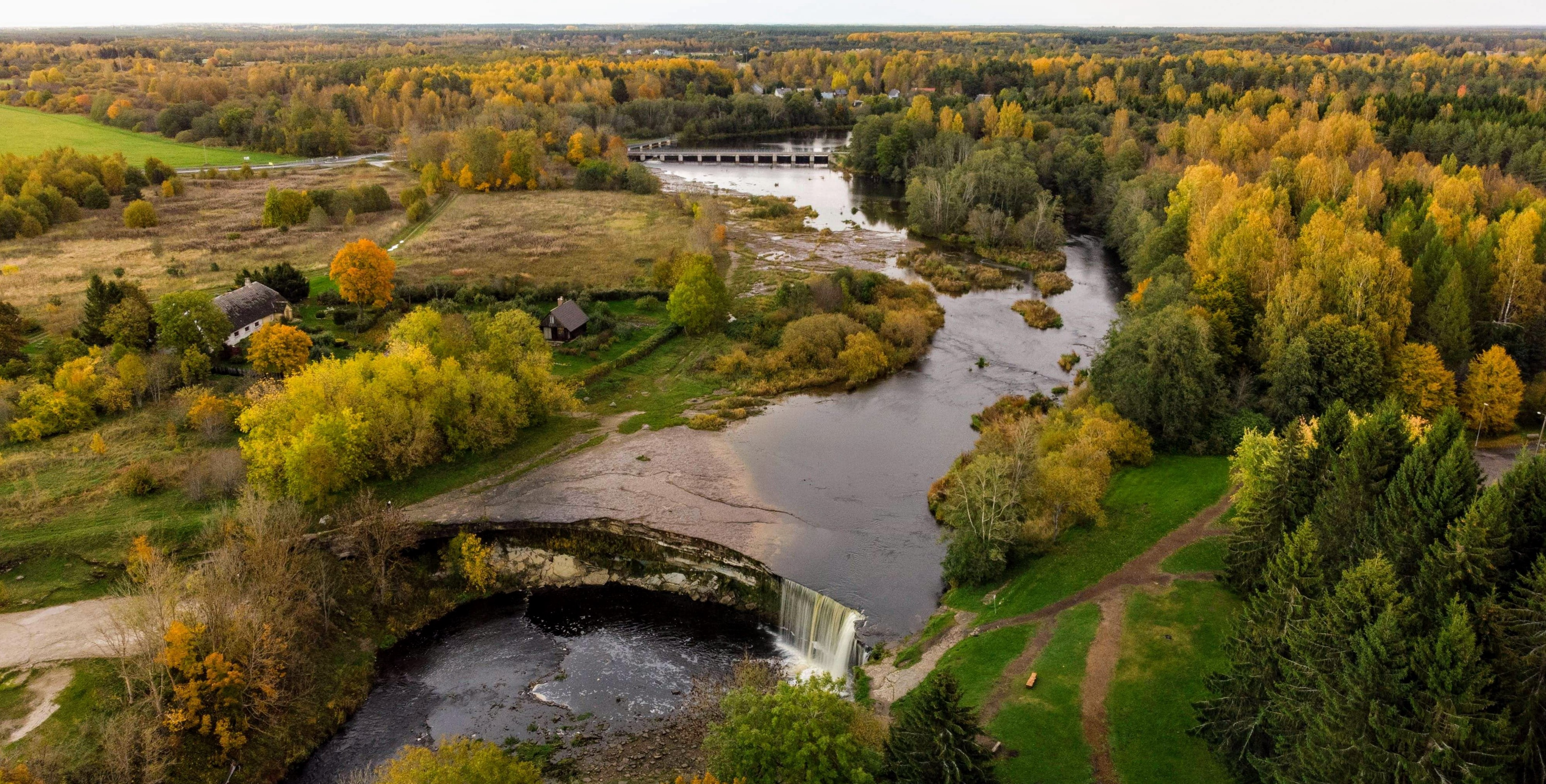
- Jägala Falls (2019)

Location
- Country: Estonia
- County: Harju, Järva

Physical characteristics
- Source
  - location: Ahula
  - coordinates: 59°06′49″N 25°44′14″E
  - elevation: 84 m (276 ft)
- Mouth: Gulf of Finland
  - location: Jõesuu
  - coordinates: 59°28′51″N 25°08′42″E
  - elevation: 0 m (0 ft)
- Length: 98.8 km (61.4 mi)
- Basin size: 1,481.3 km^{2} (571.9 sq mi)

Basin features
- Cities: Jõesuu, Jägala, Kehra, Kaunissaare
- Tributaries
  - left: Sae Stream, Kiruoja, Pikva Stream, Anija Stream, Jõelähtme
  - right: Ambla, Jänijõgi, Mustjõgi, Aavoja, Soodla

Video of Linnamäe hydroelectric power plant and its reservoir on the Jägala River in July 2022

The Jägala is a 98.8 km (61.4 mi)-long river in northern Estonia that flows into the Gulf of Finland in Jõesuu, Harju County.

The river runs mostly northwest and through Järva and Harju counties. Jägala Falls, the highest waterfall in Estonia, is located on the river.

Several reservoirs are located on the river. The Kehra pulp mill is located on the left bank of the river. The river is part of the Tallinn water supply system. The basin area of the river is 1,481.3 km^{2} (571.9 mi^{2}).

The river contains populations of trout and grayling.

== See also ==
- List of rivers of Estonia
