= Jägala =

Jägala may refer to:

- Jägala, Estonia
- Jägala (river), a river which runs through Jägala
  - Jägala Falls, a waterfall along the river
- Jägala concentration camp, a Nazi concentration camp
  - Kalevi-Liiva killing fields outside the camp
- Jägala Army Base, a defunct Estonian Defence Forces base
