= Koogi, Harju County =

Village in Estonia

Coordinates: 59°26′23″N 25°10′18″E

Koogi
- Village
- Interactive map of Koogi
- Country: Estonia
- County: Harju County
- Parish: Jõelähtme Parish
- Time zone: UTC+2 (EET)
  - Summer (DST): UTC+3 (EEST)

Koogi is a village in Jõelähtme Parish, Harju County in northern Estonia. It's lies on the left bank of the Jägala river. The Tallinn–Narva road (T1, part of E20) passes Koogi and has an intersection with Jägala–Aegviidu–Käravete road (T13). Koogi has 95 inhabitants (2005).

== Gallery ==
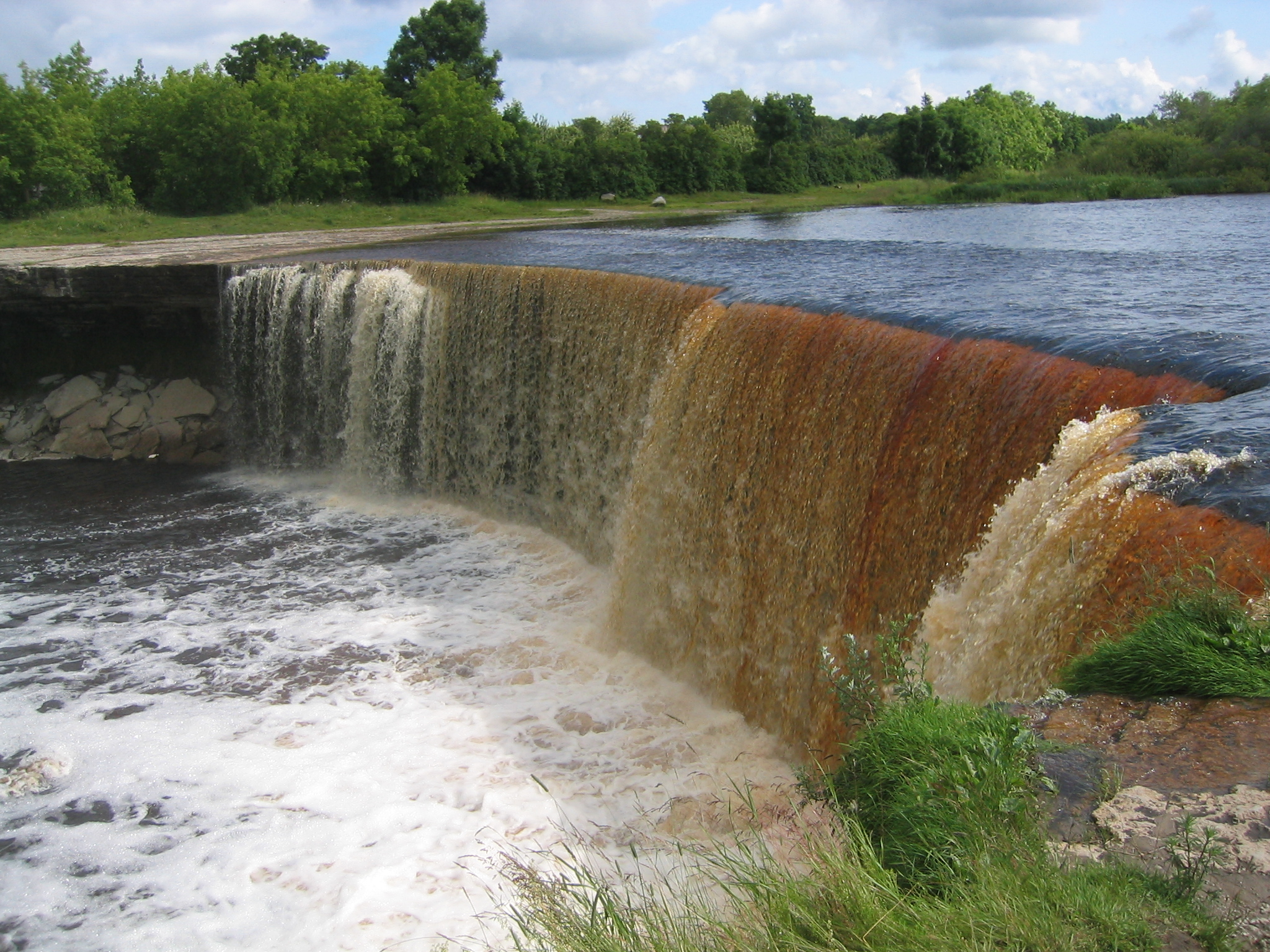
Jägala Falls on the Jägala River
