= Partsaare =

Village in Estonia

- Village
- Location in Estonia
- Coordinates: 59°23′48″N 25°18′36″E
- Country: Estonia
- County: Harju County
- Municipality: Anija Parish

Population (01.01.2010)
  - Total: 24

Partsaare is a village in Anija Parish, Harju County in northern Estonia, located on the left bank of the Jägala river. Partsaare has a population of 24 (as of 1 January 2010).

Jägala Airfield, a defunct airstrip and a road extension of Jägala–Käravete road (T13) is located in the village. The Kose–Jägala road (T12) ends in Partsaare.
