= Aavere, Harju County =

Village in Estonia

Aavere
- Village
- Location in Estonia
- Coordinates: 59°23′30″N 25°16′18″E
- Country: Estonia
- County: Harju County
- Municipality: Anija Parish

Population (2019)
  - Total: 7
- Time zone: UTC+2 (EET)
  - Summer (DST): UTC+3 (EEST)
- Postal code: 74417
- Geocode: 1046

Aavere is a village in Anija Parish, Harju County, in northern Estonia. The population was 7 in 2019.

== History ==
Aavere was first mentioned in 1241 in the Liber Census Daniæ, during the reign of King Valdemar II of Denmark, as Hauaueeræ. In 1355, the village was recorded as belonging to the Pirsu (Pirsen) manor. In 1540, the village belonged to the Anija Manor. It was part of the historic Harju-Jaani Parish. In 1923, the settlement was recorded with the present-day spelling.

== Geography ==
The village is located in northern Estonia, in western Harju County. It lies 7.12 kilometres (4.42 mi) to the northwest of the town of Kehra, the seat of the municipality. Tallinn is 29.74 kilometres (18.48 mi) to the west.

== Demographics ==
As of the 2011 census, there were 12 people. Of the total residents, 25.0% were under the age of 18; 58.3% were between the ages of 18 and 64; and 16.7% were 65 years of age or older. The gender makeup of the village was 41.7% male and 58.3% female.

== Transportation ==
The village is near the junction of Estonian national roads T12 and T13. The nearest railway station is 5.57 kilometres (3.46 mi) away in Raasiku, which links to Tallinn and Tartu.

== Points of interest ==
- Three cup-marked stones (cult stones) in the vicinity from the Stone Age or Bronze Age are registered as archaeological monuments
