= Koogi =

Koogi may refer to:

- Koogi, Harju County, village in Jõelähtme Parish, Harju County, Estonia
- Koogi, Tartu County, village in Tartu Parish, Tartu County, Estonia
- Koogi, author of the manhwa Killing Stalking
