= Jägala Airfield =

Defunct airfield in Estonia

Coordinates: 59.39800°N 25.29070°E

United States Air Force A-10 landing and taking off on Jägala Airfield in 2016.

Jägala Airfield (Estonian: Jägala lennuväli; also Jägala Highway Strip) is a defunct airfield near Jägala, in Partsaare village, Anija Parish, Harju County, Estonia. It's an extension of the current Jägala–Käravete road (T13). The airfield was meant to be an emergency use airstrip for the Soviet Air Force in case of war. In 1991 the airfield was abandoned, yet it was used in 2016 by NATO aircraft during the exercise Saber Strike 16.
