= Tallinn Higher Military-Political Construction School =

School in Estonian SSR

- Таллинское высшее военно-политическое строительное училище Tallinna Kõrgem Ehitusvägede Poliitiline Sõjakool
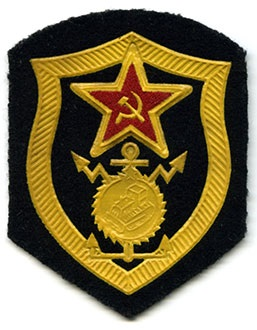
- Patch of the academy
- Type: military academy
- Active: 18 August 1979–28 April 1992
- Founders: Soviet Government
- Affiliations: Soviet Army
- Students: 1,800
- Location: Jägala Manor, Tallinn, Harju County, Estonia, Soviet Union

The Tallinn Higher Military-Political Construction School (Russian: Таллинское высшее военно-политическое строительное училище, ТВВПСУ; Estonian: Tallinna Kõrgem Ehitusvägede Poliitiline Sõjakool, TKEPS) was one of the military academies of the Soviet Union. In the years it existed, it trained military personnel in a number of specializations. It was located in Tallinn, which was the capital of the former Estonian SSR.

It trained zampolits, political officers, for military construction (Construction Troops) units, as well as the Road Troops and railway troops of the USSR.

== History ==
It was created by the Council of Ministers of the USSR of on 18 August 1979. It was formed in on the basis of the 64th course of the political staff of the Land Forces. On 30 October 1980, the Tallinn Military-Political Building School was awarded the Battle Flag. The first graduation of cadets place in 1984. On 28 April 1992, TVVPSU produced ahead of schedule the last graduation of 255 officers. Along with the military profession, they received the qualification of "social educator". Until the end of May 1992, about 700 cadets were transferred to other military schools in Russia.

== Transfer of the Military School to the Estonian Authorities ==
Jägala training center, located outside of Tallinn, was part of the school. It was handed over by Soviet/Russian forces to the Kalevi Battalion of Estonian Defence forces in 1992. This transfer was also the first peaceful take-over done by the Estonian Armed Forces. Former masters were given three days to move out and take their clothing and food supplies with them. The Estonian authorities refused to appeal to TVVPSU command with requests for permission to export property and equipment to Russia. But despite the difficulties, valuable property was managed to be taken out by air and transferred to other military schools, part of the property and the universal computing complex were transferred to the Russian Embassy in Estonia, the rest to military units deployed in Tallinn, which came under the jurisdiction of the Russian Armed Forces. In early June 1992, the Battle Banner of the school was deposited at the Central Museum of the Armed Forces, the dissolution of the university was completed on April 25, 1993.

== Activities ==
=== School structure ===
- Leadership
  - Head of the school
  - Deputy head of the school
- Training department
- Political department
- Human Resources
- Combat department
- Finance department
- RAV service
- Services of ware and food supply, fuels and lubricants
- Housing and operational department
- Automotive service

=== Studies ===
- Tactics and military disciplines
- Foreign languages
- History of the Communist Party of the Soviet Union
- Military pedagogy and psychology
- Organization (in the field of economics, technology and military construction)
- Philosophy
- Political Economics
- Engineering design
- Military buildings and special structures
- Scientific communism
- Physical training and sports
- Military technical disciplines

=== Support and service units ===
- Military Band
- Educational Training Battalion
- Medical Service
- Technical Laboratory

== List of leaders ==
=== Heads of the School ===
- Vasily Gnezdilov (1979-1987)
- Yevgeny Aunapu (1987-1991)
- Boris Bachin (1991-1992)

=== Deputy heads of the school ===
- Dmitry Ostrolutsky (1980—1982)
- Valery Vishnevsky (1982—1991)
- Sergey Porshnev (1991—1992)

== Notable graduates ==
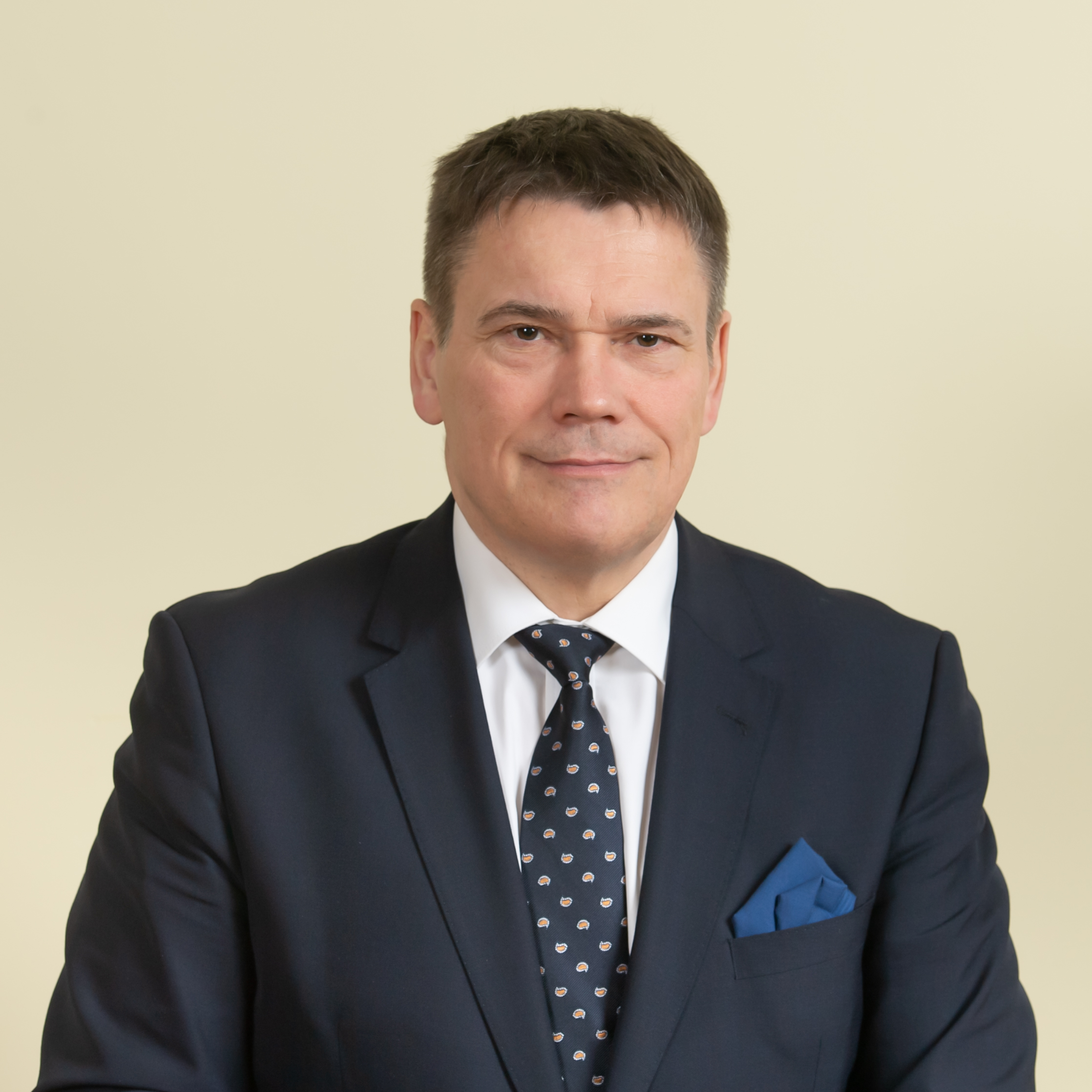
Brigadier General Alar Laneman.

- Alar Laneman – Estonian Brigadier General and member of the 14th Riigikogu.
- Andres Valme – Editor-in-chief of the newspaper "Golden Province"
- Mikhail Porechenkov – Russian film actor, producer, director who became famous after playing as FSB Agent Alexey Nikolayev in the TV series National Security Agent (1999–2005).
- Igor Panchuk – Officer in the Russian Armed Forces.
- Rajabali Rakhmonaliev – Officer in the Tajik Armed Forces who served as the former commander of the 7th Airborne Assault Brigade and the National Guard.

== See also ==
- Riga Higher Military Political School
- Baltic Defence College
- Jägala Army Base
