= Jägala-Joa =

Village in Estonia

- Village
- Location within Estonia
- Coordinates: 59°27′13″N 25°10′41″E
- Country: Estonia
- County: Harju County
- Parish: Jõelähtme Parish

Population (2007)
  - Total: 36
- Time zone: UTC+2 (EET)
  - Summer (DST): UTC+3 (EEST)

Jägala-Joa is a village in Jõelähtme Parish, Harju County in northern Estonia. It lies on the right bank of the Jägala River.

== Gallery ==
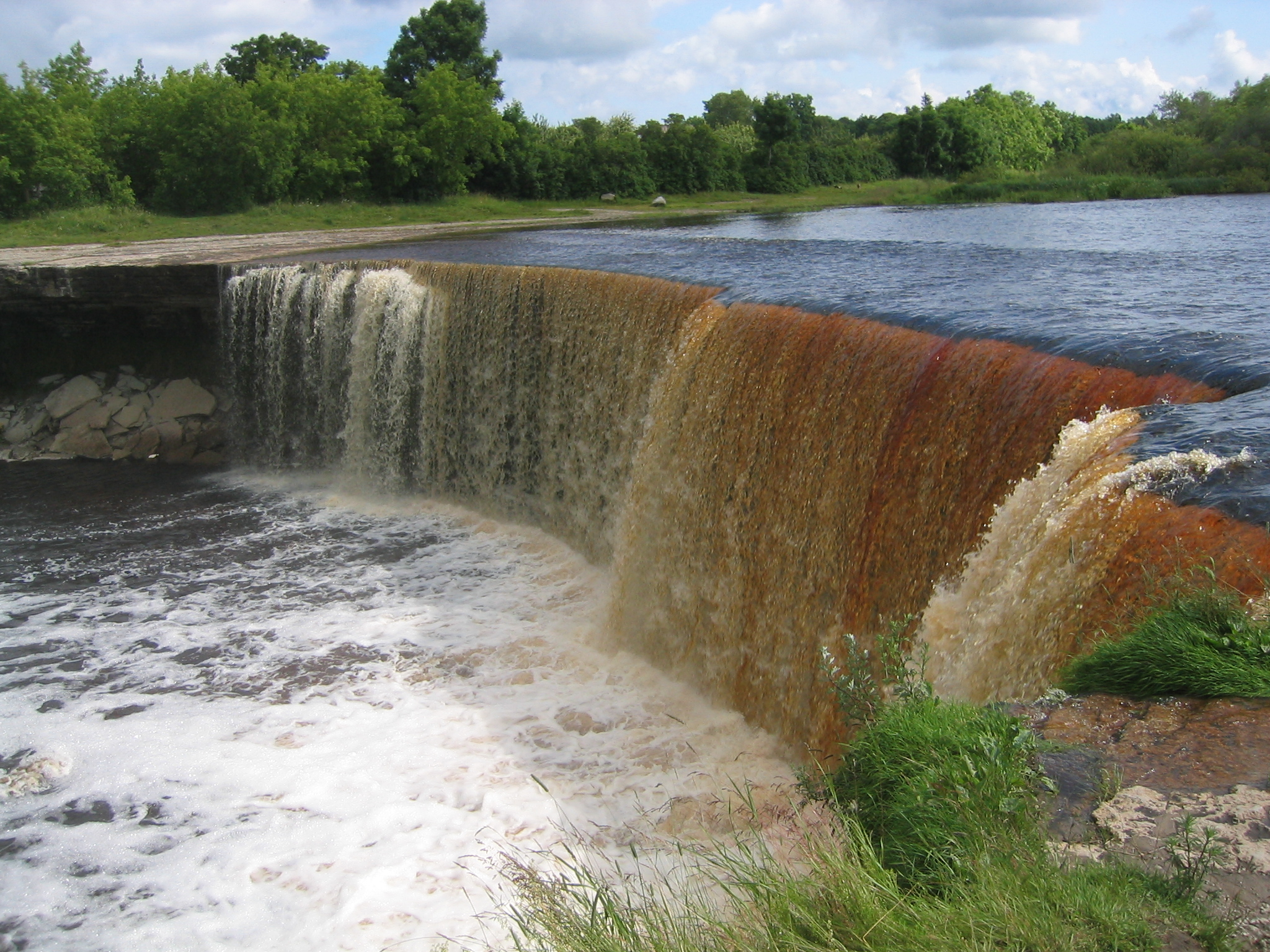
Jägala Falls on the Jägala River

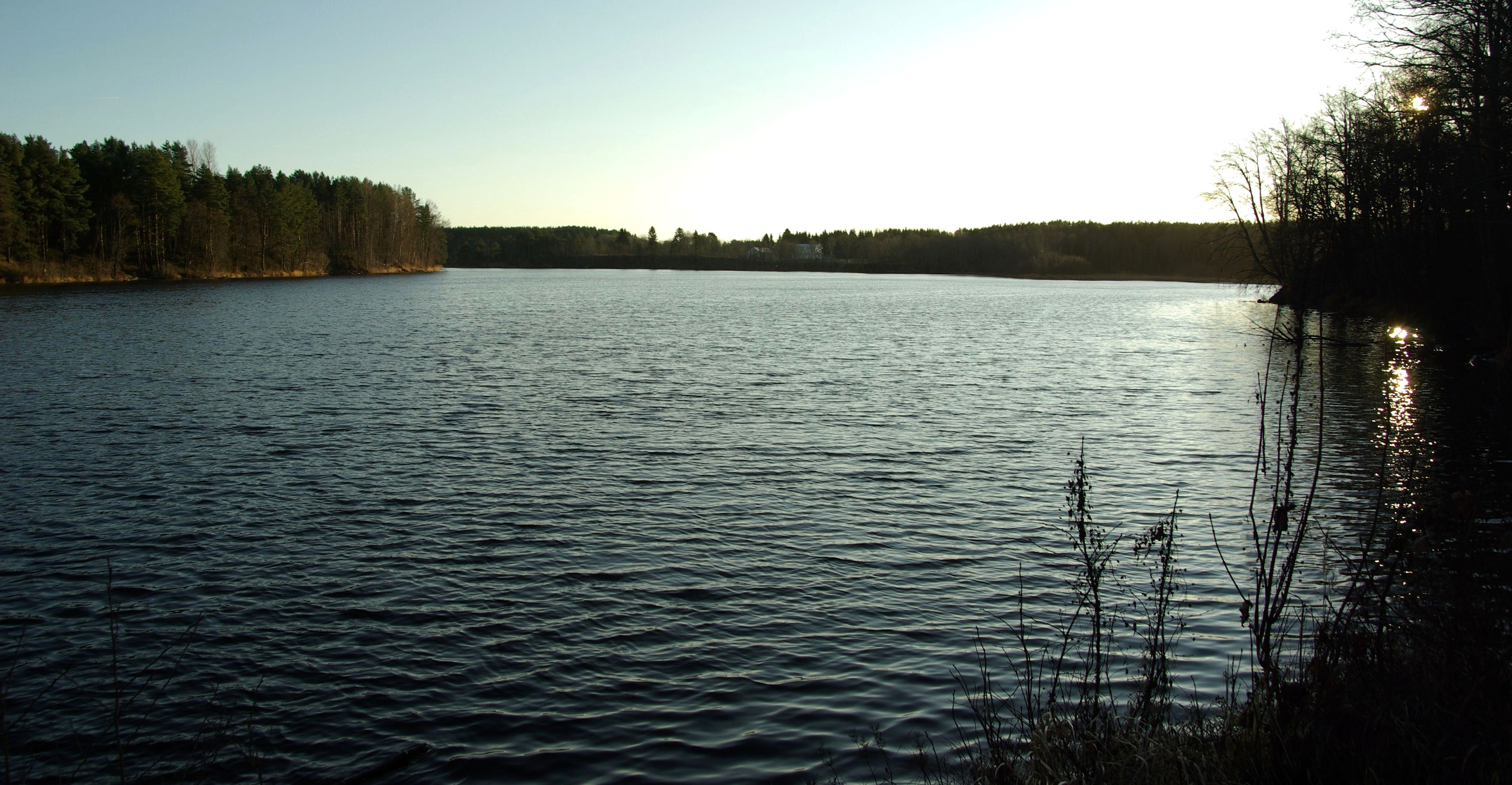
Linnamäe impounded lake on the Jägala River

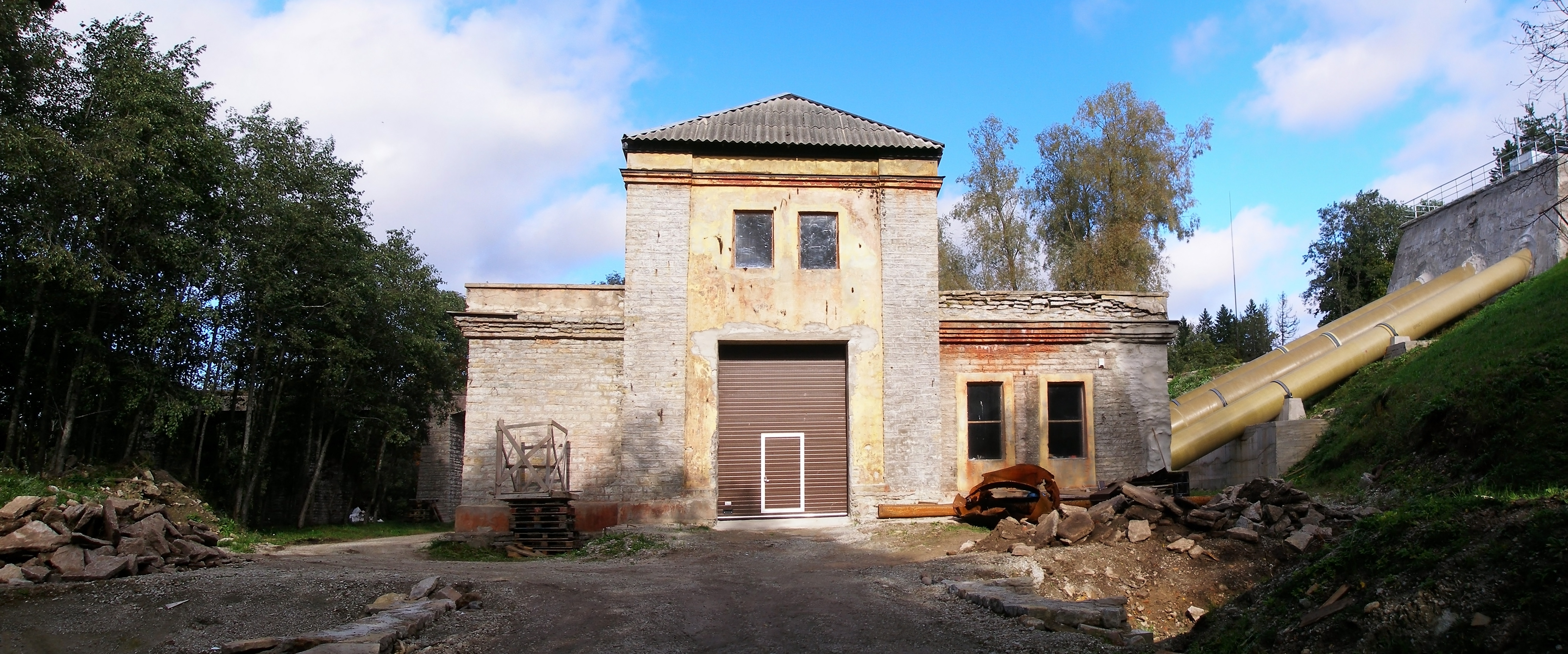
Jägala hydroelectric power station, known as a filming location of Andrei Tarkovsky's Stalker

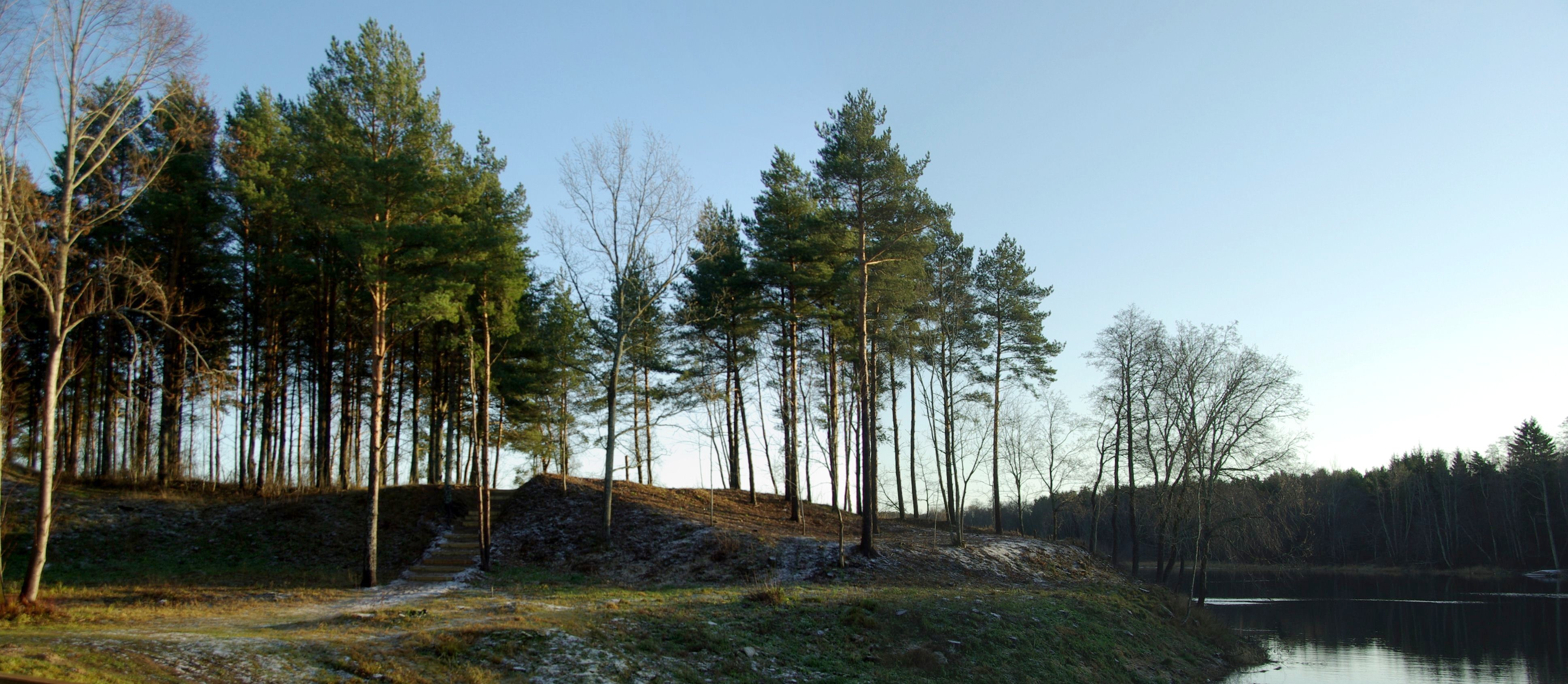
Jägala hill fort
