= Jägala Waterfall =

Waterfall in Estonia

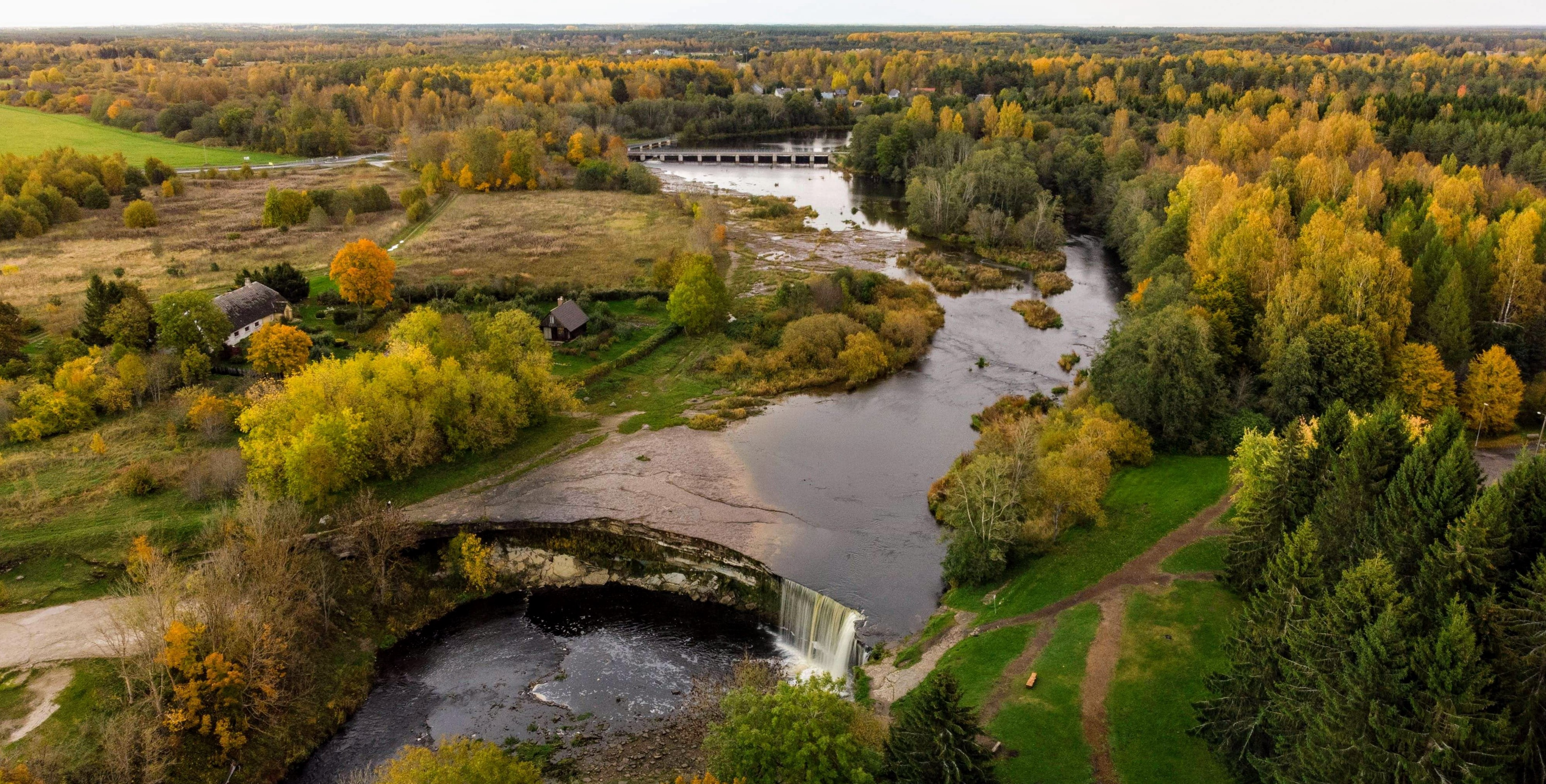

- Location within Estonia Location within Harju County
- Location: Jägala-Joa, Jõelähtme Parish, Harju County, Estonia
- Coordinates: 59.4498160°N 25.1785457°E
- Elevation: 84 m (276 ft)
- Total height: 8 m (26 ft)
- Number of drops: 1
- Total width: 50 m (160 ft)
- Watercourse: Jägala River
- Average flow rate: 12.8 m^{3}/s (450 cu ft/s)

A video of the Jägala Waterfall in July 2022

Jägala Waterfall (Estonian: Jägala juga) is a waterfall in northern Estonia on the Jägala River. It is the largest natural waterfall in Estonia, with a width of about 50 meters (160 ft) and a height of about 8 meters (26 ft). Jägala Waterfall is located in Koogi in Harju County. Jägala Waterfall is also the most powerful waterfall in Estonia, cascading 12.8 cubic meters per second (450 cu ft/s) of water. It can even reach 200 cubic meters per second (7,100 cu ft/s) during spring in high water periods. Though, the cascade stops in the winter, freezing over.

== Waterfall and rivers ==
Jägala Waterfall was formed by eroding away limestone layers in a karst area. The limestone bluff is commonly known as the Baltic Cliff. The river deteriorated the cliff into a U-shape. The erosion made the waterfall retreat up to 17 centimeters (6.7 in) per year. The water now flows down 8 meters (26 ft). The curved ground is 65 meters (213 ft) long and the water flows 12.8 cubic meters per second (450 cu ft/s).

After the waterfall, the river continues and speeds up from the confluence of the Jõelähtme River, 300 meters (980 ft) from the Jägala Waterfall. It then passes through the Jägala hydroelectric powerplant, which then speeds it up more and guides it to the Linnamäki dam. The river then falls 11 meters (36 ft) from the dam and continues on its natural path. The river continues for a total of 37.2 kilometers (23.1 mi) after the waterfall.

== Geography ==
Jägala Waterfall is located in the municipality of Jõelähtme in the village of Jägala-Joa, 25 kilometers (16 mi) east of Tallinn, and only a thirty minute drive from Tallinn. The fastest way to get there by Tallinn would be a taxi which can cost between €21 and €26 ($22.61 to $27.99). The cheapest way would be the line 158 and 152 bus which can cost between €1 and €3 ($1.08 to $3.23). It is surrounded by fertile farmland to the east and west, with villages alongside the river. The river flows from Ihasalu Bay into the Gulf of Finland.

== Geology ==
Jägala Waterfall plummets from the North Estonian bank which is a cut into the Paleozoic bedrock. Ordovician sedimentary rocks got exposed from the stream, it then also uncovered many other deposits, especially limestone. The limestone had fossilized many naticoids into the limestone. Over thousands of years, the waterfall eroded the edge of the cliff, and the threshold made the land ahead uplift. It then eroded a valley 280 meters (919 ft) long and 13 meters (43 ft) meters deep, where the river flows today.

The rock that makes up the falls were made from the Fennoscandian Shield (or Baltic Shield) and East European Platform colliding and forming the Baltic klint. The Baltic klint was made between 1.5 and 2 billion years ago. This formed the Baltic Cliff. The Waterfall on the other hand, was formed about 3,000 years ago.

== History ==
Before the waterfall was named Jägala Waterfall, its folk name was Joarüngas. Some people think that there used to be a place of worship here, worshipping the waterfall, that was around 1240. Maps dating from 1688 also say that there might have been a water-powered mill here. Later on, during World War II, the Nazis built a concentration camp here called the Jägala Concentration Camp around August 10 to 13, 1942. The camp killed an estimated 2,000 to 3,000 Jews. The camp was closed in 1943 after almost all prisoners were relocated to the Tallinn Central Prison, and any other remaining prisoners were shot and killed.

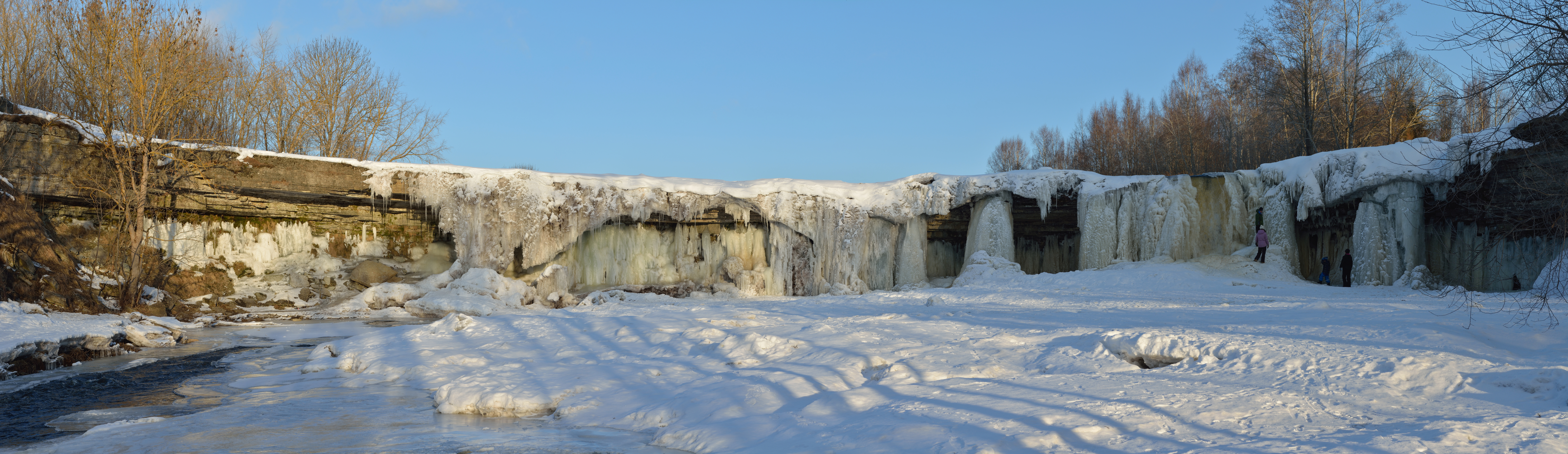
Waterfall in March 2013

== See also ==
- List of waterfalls
