= Estonian national road 12 =

Road in Estonia

- Tugimaantee 12
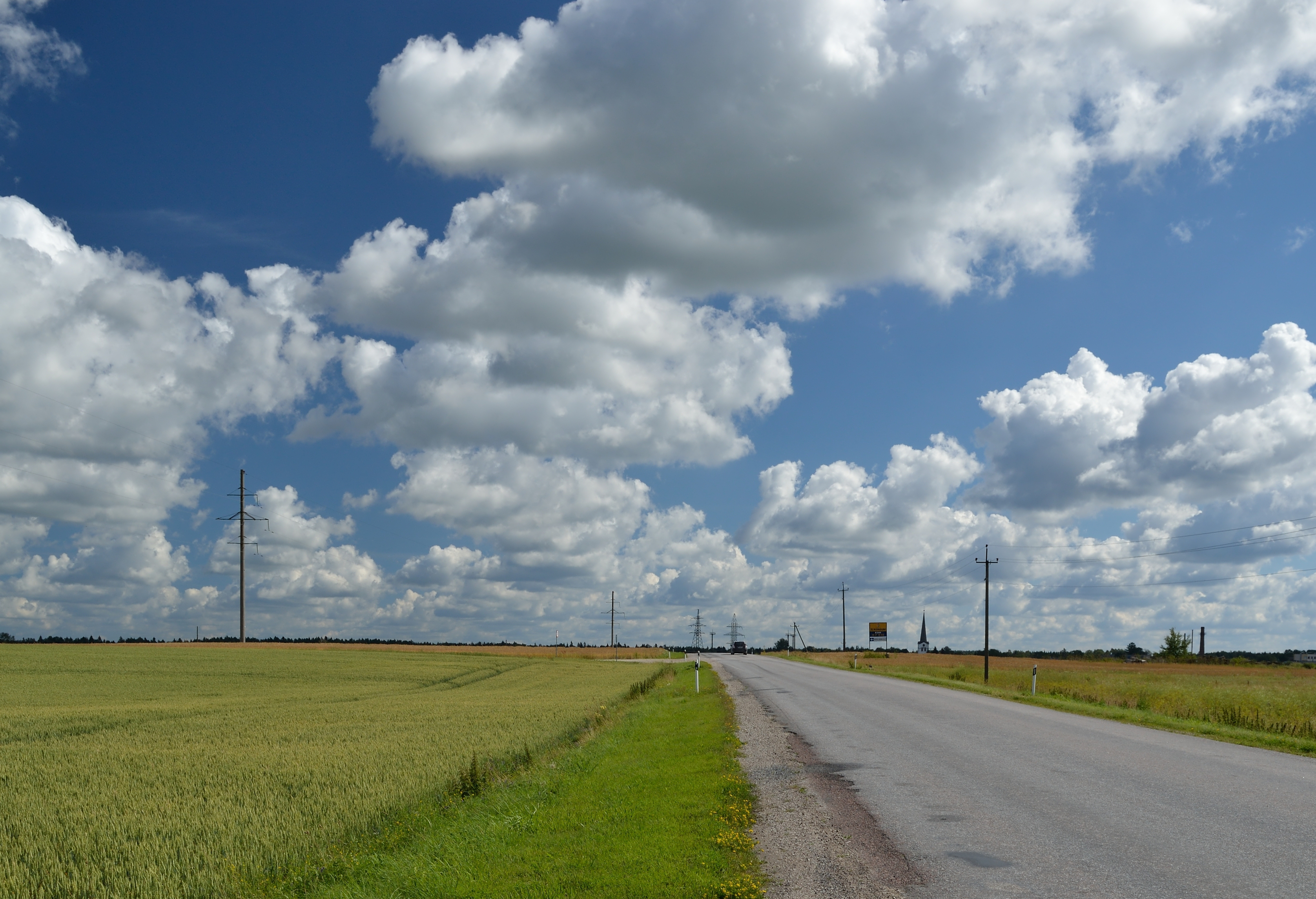

Route information
- Length: 36.1 km (22.4 mi)

Major junctions
- From: Kose ( T2)
- To: Jägala ( T13)

Location
- Country: Estonia

Highway system
- Transport in Estonia
← T11	→ T13

Tugimaantee 12 (ofcl. abbr. T12), also called the Kose–Jägala highway (Estonian: Kose–Jägala maantee), is a 36.1-kilometre-long national basic road in northern Estonia. The highway begins at Kose on national road 2 and ends at Jägala on national road 13.

== Route ==
T12 is located entirely in Harju County and it passes through the following municipalities:

- Anija Parish
- Kose Parish

== See also ==
- Transport in Estonia
