= Jägala Army Base =

Military installation in Estonia

Jägala Army Base Jägala sõjaväelinnak
- Estonia

Site information
- Controlled by: Soviet Armed Forces; Estonian Defence Forces

Location
- Coordinates: 59°25′00″N 025°14′00″E

Jägala Army Base is a former military base of the Estonian Defence Forces in Jägala village in Jõelähtme Parish, Harju County, Estonia. The base is located about 25 kilometres to the east of Tallinn.

== History ==
During the Soviet occupation of Estonia, the location was a former Soviet military base. Members of the Kalev Infantry Battalion took over the base from Soviet forces in 1992, shortly after Estonia restored its independence, making it the first military base to be peacefully taken over. Former officers were given three days to leave and take their clothing and food with them. Between 1992 and 2002 this was used as an Estonia Kalevi Infantry Battalion base. After disbandment of this unit there were some Defence League units, but the area was rarely used. Some reserve refreshment courses took part in Jägala.

== Plans ==
There was insufficient space to develop Tallinn garrison military units. The barracks and other structures required renovations. Training and shooting ranges are situated outside of the city. A decision was therefore made to relocate Guard, Logistics and other battalions from the city. The first plan which included development of Männiku training area was postponed in 2006. After this a search was made to find a new area for Tallinn garrison units. Jägala met the requirements and was selected.

The Eesti Vabariigi Kaitseministeerium (Ministry of Defence) made a decision to build a new army base for Guard, Intelligence, Logistics and Staff and Signal Battalions. The Military Police and Northern Defence Command HQ would occupy old barracks of the Guard Battalion in Rahumäe. Construction of Jägala army base and renovation of Ämari Air base is the largest infrastructure projects in 2008–2018 Estonian army development plan. Investments in Jägala base project are expected not less than 96 mn. EURO. The Ground forces plan to complete bases in Jägala, Tapa Army Base, Paldiski, Jõhvi and Võru according to the mentioned plan. What is more Central Training Area is not far from here.

=== Criticism ===
Most part of the Guard Battalion ceremonial and other duties take part in the capital of Estonia. One more disadvantage is concentration of forces, equipment and materials. About one quarter of regular Estonian armed forces would be here.

=== Demolishing ===
Jägala army base was demolished in 2013 due to a lack of modernisation and the presence of potentially hazardous buildings. It was conducted by the order of the defence minister Urmas Reinsalu and the chancellor, infrastructure department and defence force were informed. As per law, the local council should have given their approval, but this was not applied for before demolishing could start. This was cleared on a later date, but most of the base had been already demolished at the time.

== See also ==
- Tallinn Higher Military-Political Construction School
