= Käravete =

Borough in Estonia

- Small borough
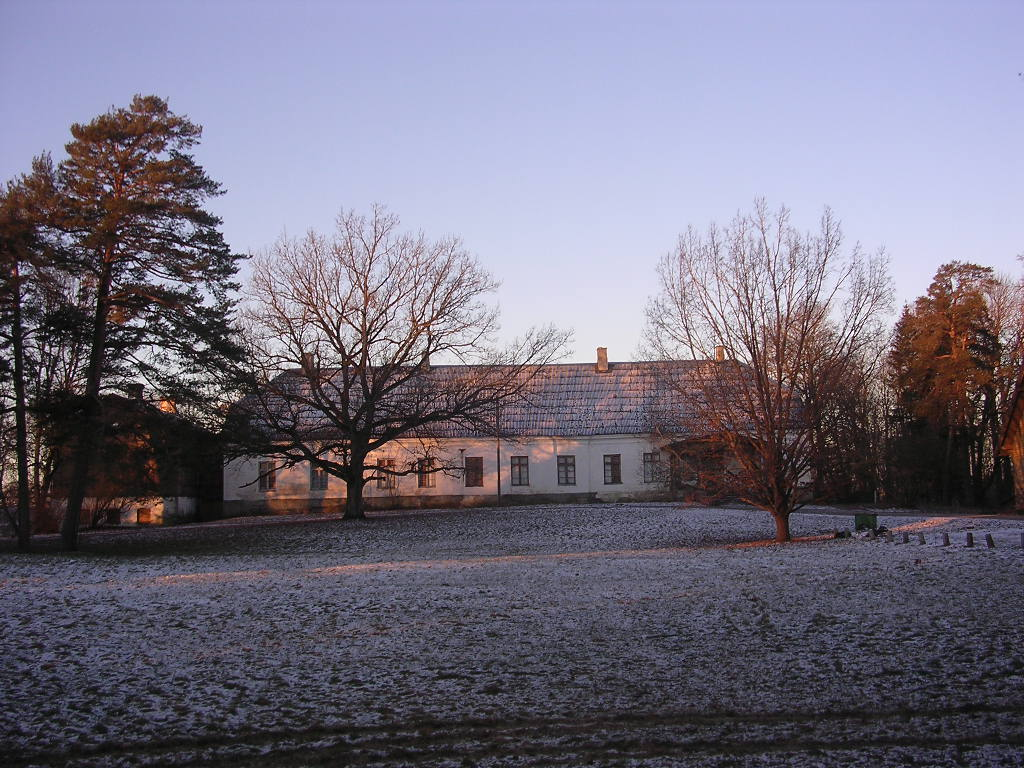
- Käravete Manor

- Location in Estonia
- Coordinates: 59°11′21″N 25°45′52″E
- Country: Estonia
- County: Järva County
- Municipality: Järva Parish

Population (2011 Census)
  - Total: 234

Käravete (German: Kerrafer) is a small borough (Estonian: alevik) in Järva Parish, Järva County, central Estonia. As of the 2011 census, the settlement's population was 234.
