= Estonian national road 13 =

Road in Estonia

- Tugimaantee 13
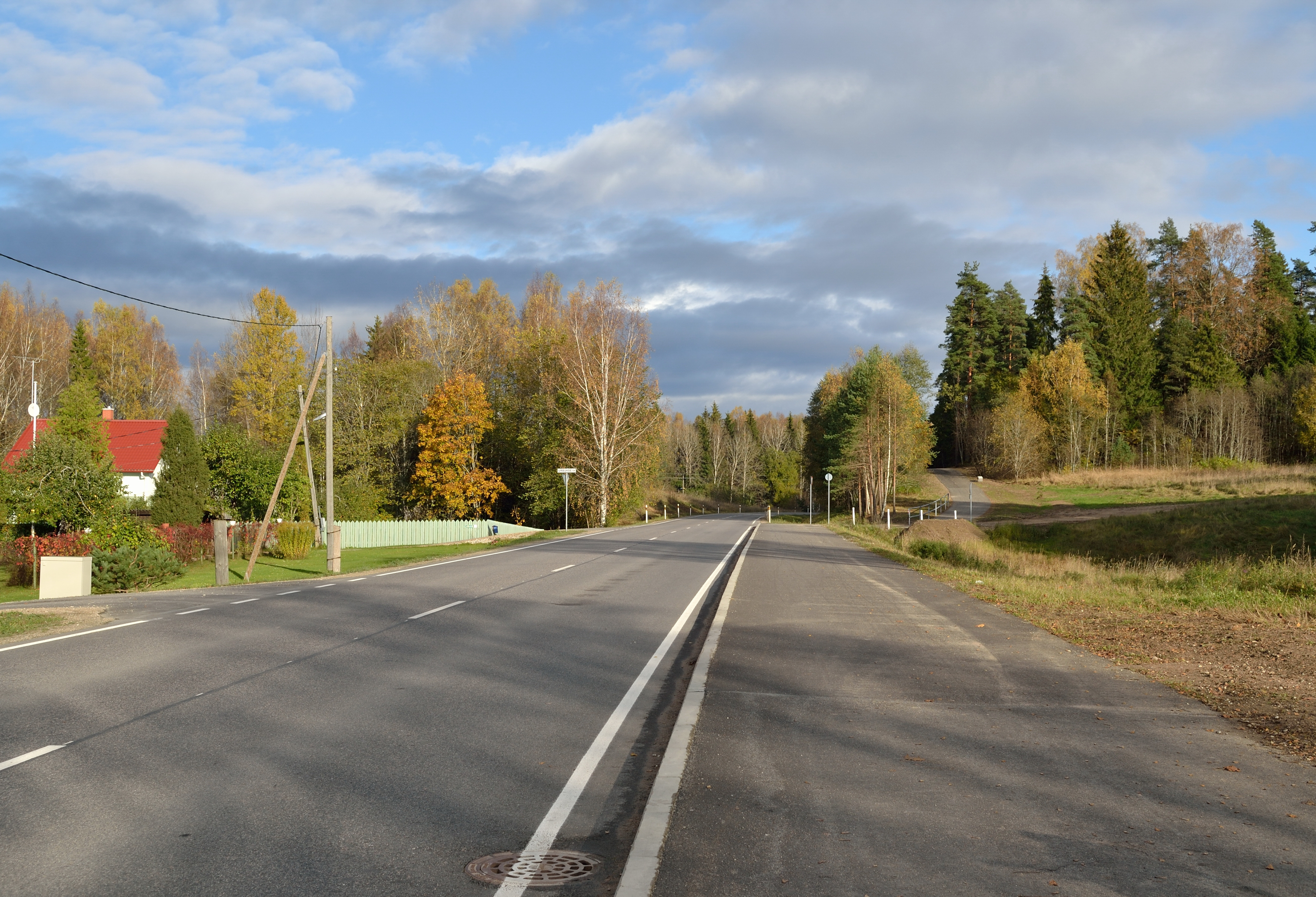

Route information
- Length: 52.7 km (32.7 mi)

Major junctions
- From: Jägala ( T1)
- To: Käravete ( T5)

Location
- Country: Estonia

Highway system
- Transport in Estonia
← T12	→ T14

Tugimaantee 13 (ofcl. abbr. T13), also called the Jägala–Käravete highway (Estonian: Jägala–Käravete maantee), is a 52.7-kilometre-long national basic road in northern Estonia. The highway begins at Jägala on national road 1 and ends at Käravete on national road 5.

== Route ==
T13 passes through the following counties and municipalities:

Harju County

- Jõelähtme Parish
- Anija Parish

Lääne-Viru County

- Tapa Parish

Järva County

- Järva Parish

== See also ==
- Transport in Estonia
