= Jägala, Estonia =

Village in Estonia

Jägala
- Village
- Location within Estonia
- Coordinates: 59°25′04″N 25°14′12″E
- Country: Estonia
- County: Harju County
- Parish: Jõelähtme Parish
- Time zone: UTC+2 (EET)
  - Summer (DST): UTC+3 (EEST)

Jägala (German: Jaggowal) is a village in Jõelähtme Parish, Harju County, in northern Estonia. It lies on the Jägala river, south of the Tallinn–Narva road (T1, part of E20), about 28 km (17 mi) east of Tallinn. The Jägala–Käravete road (T13) starts in Jägala and passes through the village centre. Jägala had 139 inhabitants in 2007.

Jägala Army Base, a disused military base is located in the village.

== History ==
During World War II, the Jägala concentration camp is built and operated next to the village.

== See also ==
- Jägala Airfield
