= History of rail transport in Estonia =

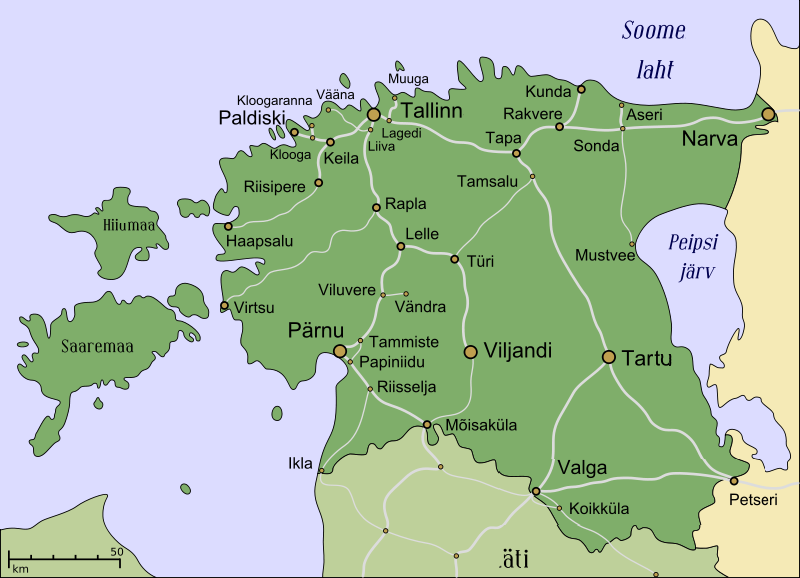
All railway lines in Estonia (including demolished)

The history of rail transport in Estonia starts in 1870 when a railway line was opened connecting Paldiski, Tallinn, Tapa and Narva; the line extending all the way to Saint Petersburg in Russia.

== Beginnings of Estonian railways in Imperial Russia ==
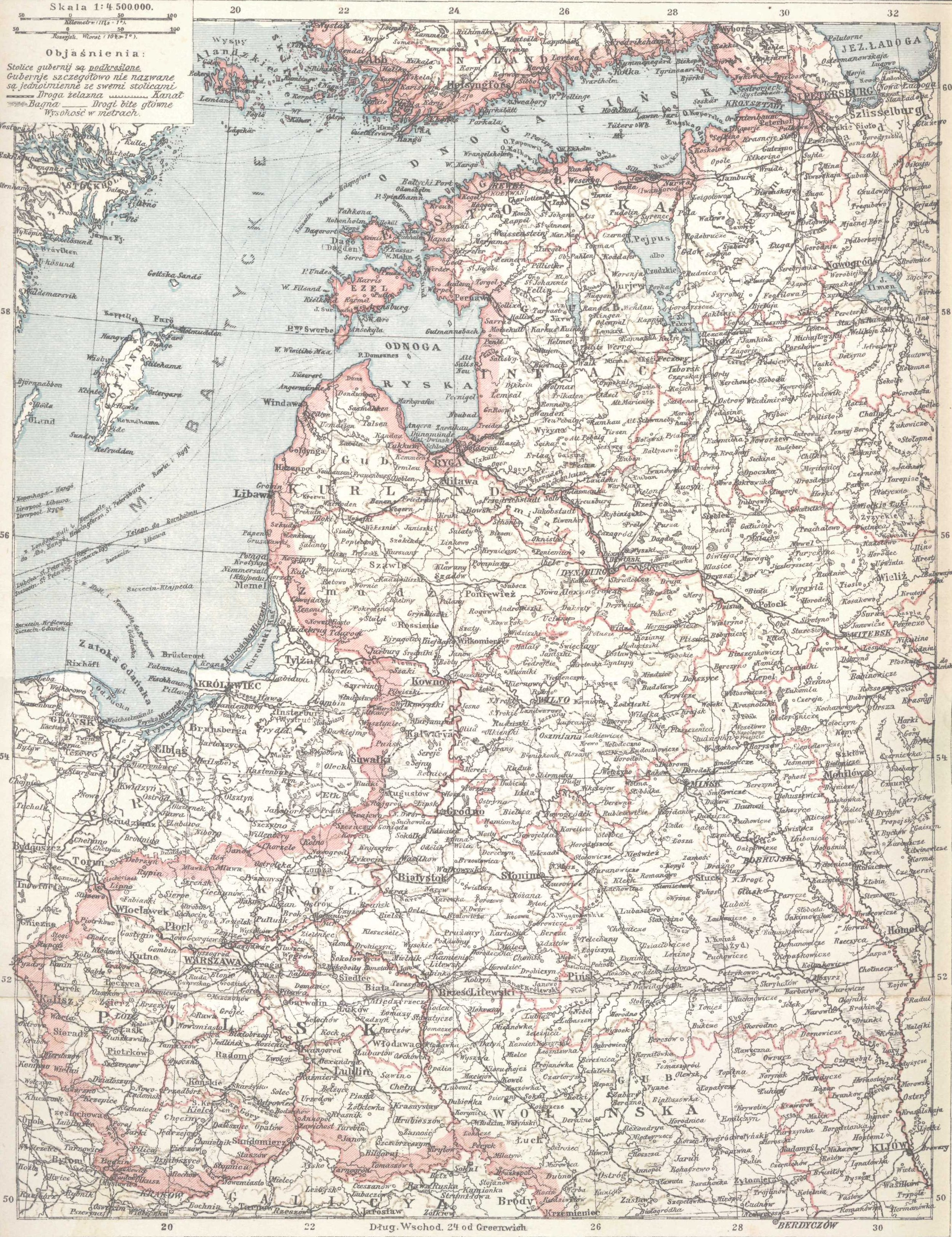
Railway lines in the Baltic governorates of the Russian Empire and Polish Kingdom in 1902.

The first railway line to be built in Estonia was the Paldiski – Tallinn – Narva – Gatchina line constructed in 1870; Baltic German nobility provided the impetus for the construction of the line, though because of the Russian influence the line was built to 1524mm (5 ft) gauge to connect with the line from Saint Petersburg to Warsaw . The construction project was controlled by the Russian Ministry of Roads. The port of Paldiski was chosen because its southerly position made it ice free all the year round. Soon after both Paldiski and Tallinn experienced an upswing in trade, notably exports of grain.

In 1877 another line was complete, connecting Tapa and Tartu; later extended to Valga in 1887, which brought a connection to Latvia via the Pskov – Valga – Riga line also being constructed at the same time.

Additionally a network of narrow gauge railways (750mm) were being built in Estonia, the first connecting Valga and Pärnu in 1896, then Mõisaküla to Viljandi (1897), later extended via Paide to Tallinn in 1901.

== Railways in the republic of Estonia (1918–1940) ==
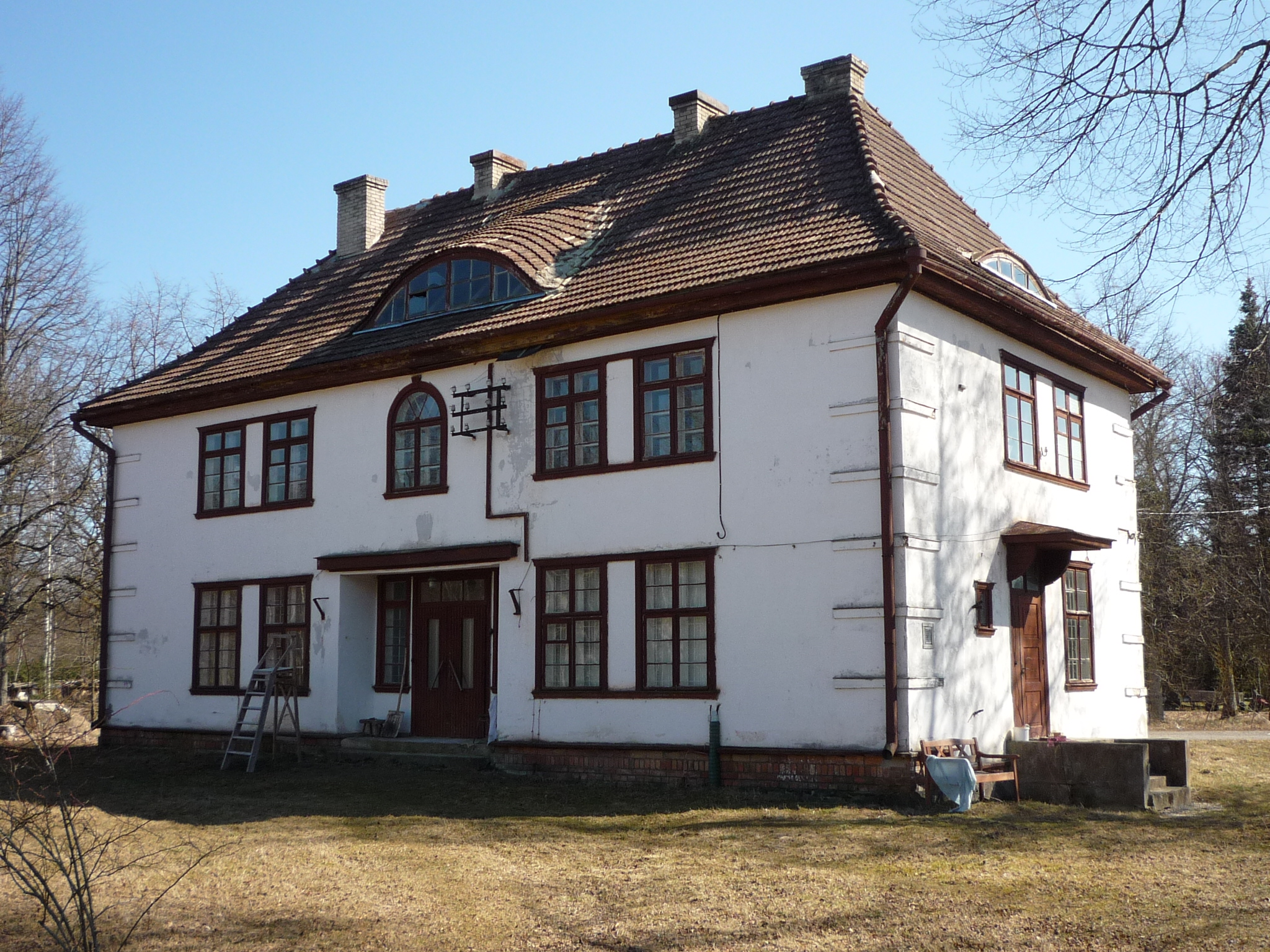
Karuse railway station (built in 1928) on the former narrow-gauge Rapla–Virtsu line

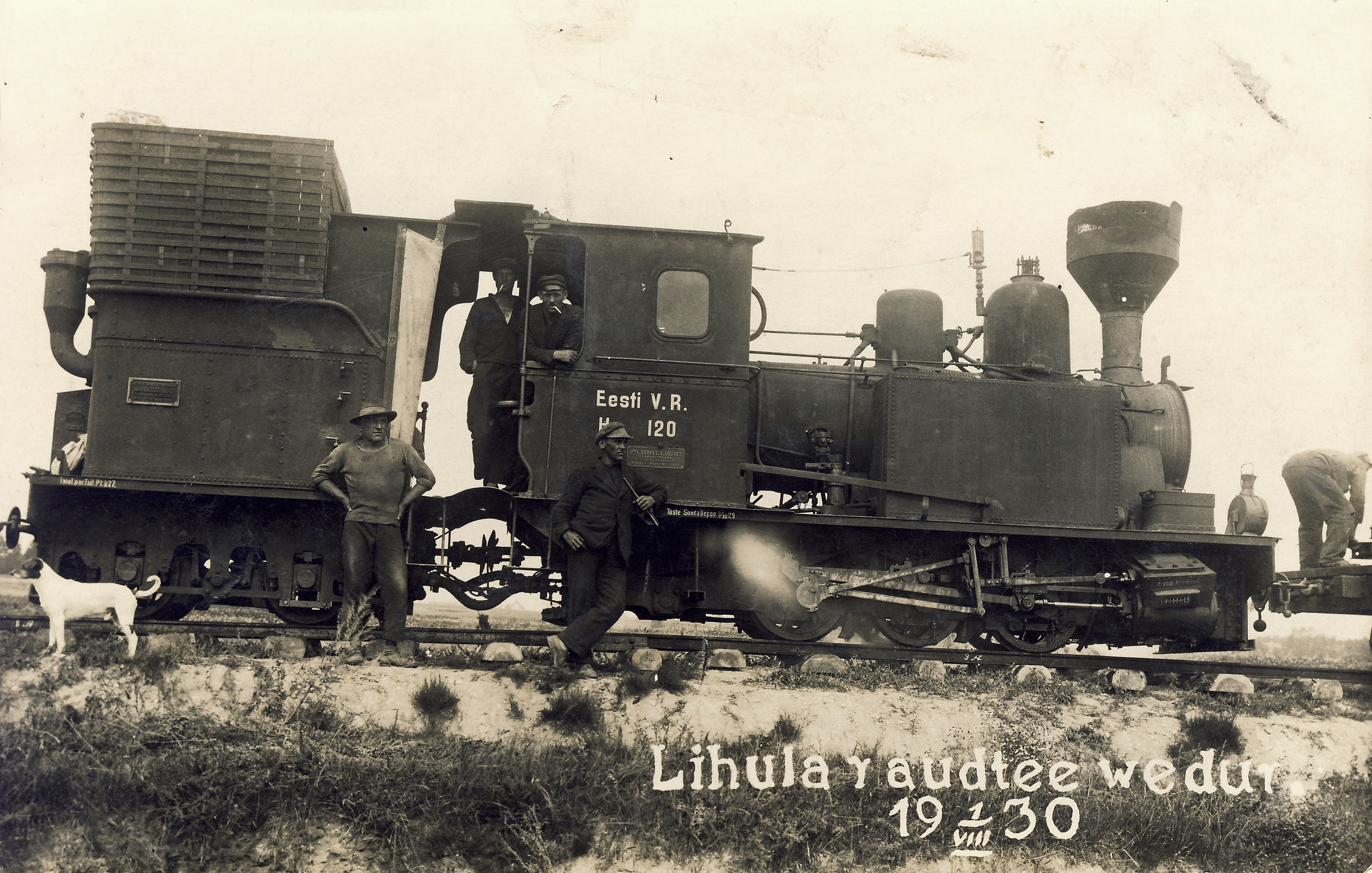
A Corpet-Louvet locomotive in Estonia, 1930

At the end of World War I and the collapse of the Russian Empire, the country was occupied by Germany and a puppet government installed. This subsequently collapsed with German defeat in World War I and Estonia became a republic in 1918. Finally, after the expulsion of invading Soviet forces during the Estonian War of Independence, Estonia became a recognised independent republic in 1920.

At the time of its creation, the railways had 648 km of broad gauge and 187 km of narrow gauge track and 90 broad gauge locomotives, 72 narrow gauge locomotives plus rolling stock.

Thus the railways of Estonia became known as Eesti Raudtee (EVR), formed from the Looderaudtee (North-Western Railway), Esimese Juurdeveoteede Selts (First Association of Approach Tracks) as well as military and other railway lines. One consequence of the new independence was that the railway architecture did not have to follow the imperial style set out in St. Petersburg - architectural trends followed those in other parts of the world - with neo-baroque styles with romantic-vernacular elements giving way to functionalist architecture in the 1930s.

In 1931, a 1524mm gauge line opened between Tartu and Petseri.

By 1940, the EVR had 772 km of broad gauge and 675 km of narrow gauge track.

== Railways in the Estonian SSR (1940–1991) ==
In June 1940, Estonia was invaded by the Soviet Union becoming the Estonian SSR; EVR became part of the Russian rail system again, the country was invaded by Nazi Germany and occupied by German forces between 1941 and 1944. During German occupation the network was converted to standard (1435mm) gauge, and rolling stock from Germany used. After the end of the Second World War, Estonia was once again part of the Soviet Union and the railways were run as part of the Soviet Union's rail network; the track was converted back to broad (Russian) gauge.

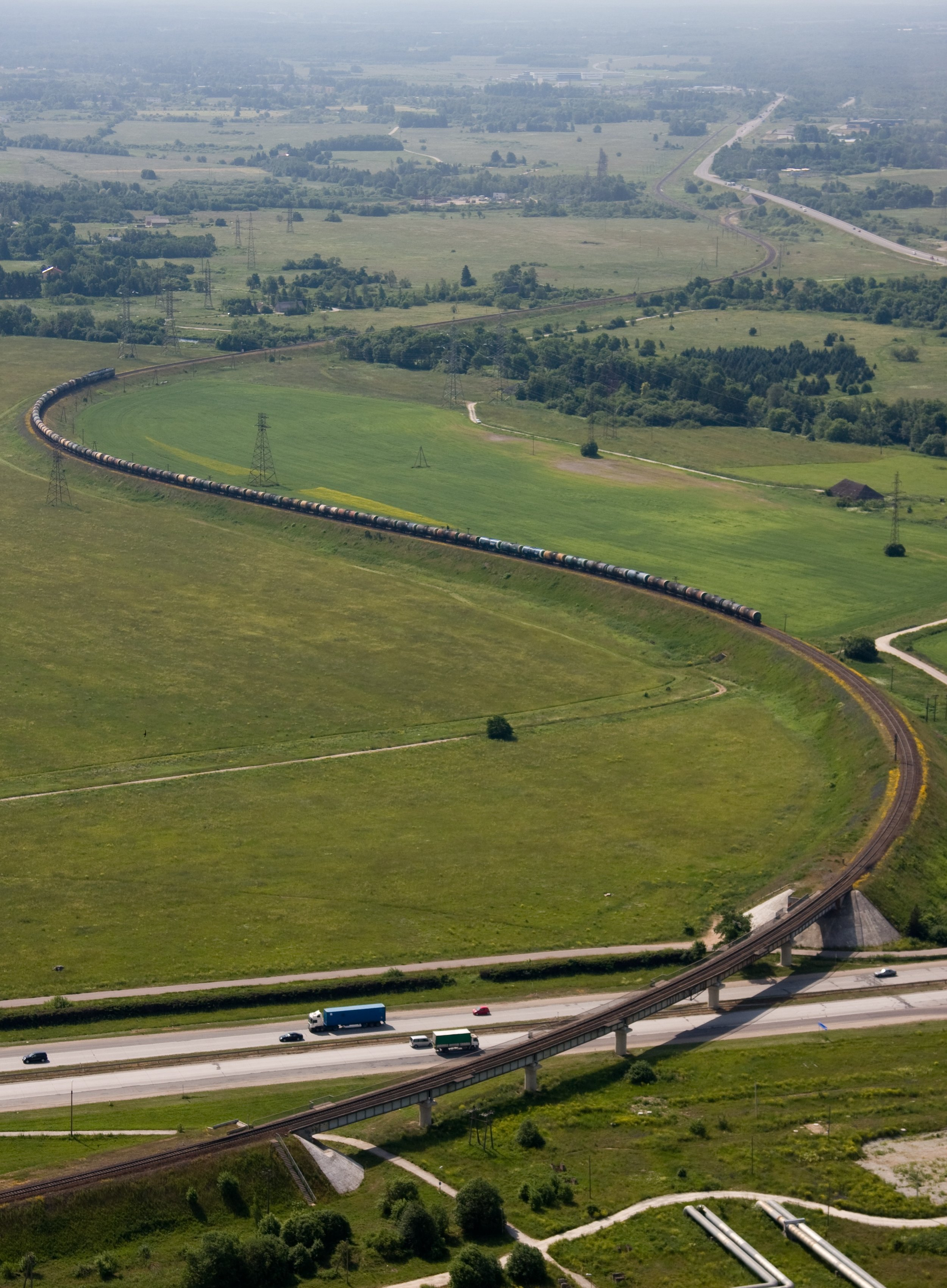
Lagedi–Muuga line, built in mid-1980s together with the Port of Muuga

Much infrastructure was destroyed during the war and as a consequence many station buildings are in the neo-classicist style (see Stalinist architecture) having been rebuilt in the post war years.

Soviet planning placed the emphasis on broad gauge track and much freight formerly transported on narrow gauge lines was moved by road, lines were also converted to broad gauge. Starting in 1957, steam locomotives began to be replaced by diesel locomotives. Though the narrow gauge lines were closed the broad gauge sections prospered: in 1945 passenger numbers were 12.2 million, freight volumes 4.3million tonnes. The railway network became part of the Pribaltiiskaya Railway (Note: One of the fifteen zones of the Soviet rail network - the Pribaltiiskaya part included the rail networks of the Baltic states.)

New broad gauge lines were built in the 1960s replacing some of the narrow gauge lines while some others were closed. (Note: All the Edelaraudtee lines are on former narrow gauge track) The last public narrow gauge line closed in June 1973.

In 1980, 36.5 million passengers were being carried.

The construction of a new port at Muuga (north-east of Tallinn) began in 1982, as part of that project a new railway link between Tallinn and Tapa was updated to a double track to allow more rail traffic to pass through the railway line, the construction started in March 1985 and was completed in January 1992.

In 1990, 30.1 million tonnes of freight carried; the new port contributing significantly to this figure.

== Railways in Estonia (1991–) ==
Railway lines in Estonia in public use as of 2015

Estonia began moving towards a second independence in 1988, and by 1991 was recognised as an independent state. On 1 January 1992 Eesti Raudtee (EVR) came into being as a state owned company.

=== Privatisation ===
As part of a privatisation plan EVR became Estonian Railways Ltd. in 1997 with the state controlling 100% of the shares.

Three organisations were formed in 1997–1998 for future privatisation:

- In 1997 Edelaraudtee AS for diesel powered internal regional trains serving the lines Tallinn–Tartu, Tallinn–Rakvere–Narva, Tallinn–Rapla, Tallinn–Türi–Viljandi, Tallinn–Pärnu and Tartu–Põlva–Orava., and freight on the Tallinn-Pärnu-Mõisaküla and Lelle-Viljandi lines.
- In 1998 Elektriraudtee AS for electric 'mass-transit' trains in Tallinn and the surrounding Harju County.
- In 1998 EVR-Ekspress – operating international long distance traffic. (renamed GoRail in 2004 privatisation)

In 2001 a 66% stake in EVR was acquired for $58 million by Baltic Rail Services (BRS). Whilst under private ownership many second hand American built GE locomotives were introduced. In 2007 EVR was re-nationalised and the company became 100% state owned again.

=== Future ===
In 2004 Estonia joined the European union – for rail transport this has clear consequences, an EU directive of 1991 (EU Directive 91/440) suggested the separation of railway operation structure into track, and train operators with the intention of encouraging or allowing new railway operators to be able to run trains on other companies tracks ("de-monopolisation of railways"), a related directive extends the encouragement of competition to inter-state railway operations. For the railways of Estonia this means the possibility of new companies operating on Estonian railways such as the Haapsalu Raudtee which sees restarting passenger operations on the Haapsalu line as a possible option, and increased competition from other railways, such as the Russian company SeverStal.

== See also ==
- History of rail transport
- History of Estonia
- Rail transport in Estonia
- Narrow gauge railways in Estonia
