= Vaksali =

Neighbourhood of Tartu, Estonia

Coordinates: 58°22′19.83″N 26°42′36.14″E

- Neighbourhood of Tartu
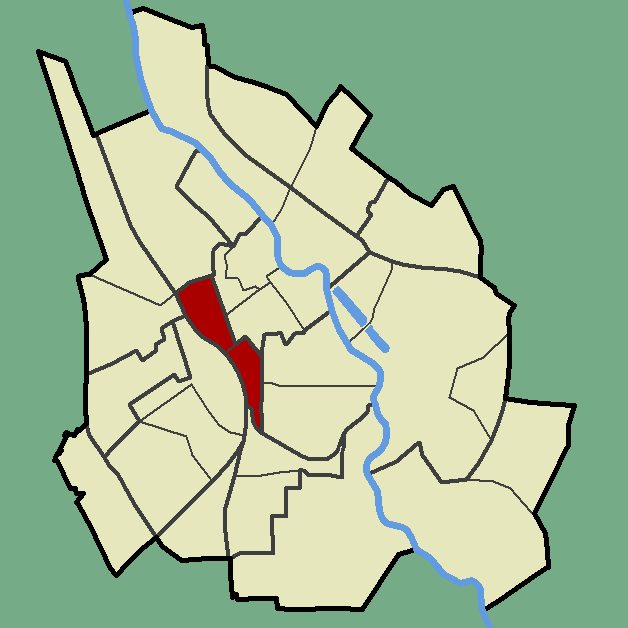
- Location of Vaksali in Tartu.
- Country: Estonia
- County: Tartu County
- City: Tartu

Area
  - Total: 0.76 km^{2} (0.29 sq mi)

Population (31.12.2013)
  - Total: 3,105
  - Density: 4,100/km^{2} (11,000/sq mi)

Vaksali (Estonian for "Station") is a neighbourhood of Tartu, Estonia. It is one of the smallest districts of Tartu, it has a population of 3,105 (as of 31 December 2013) and an area of 0.76 km^{2} (0.29 mi^{2}).

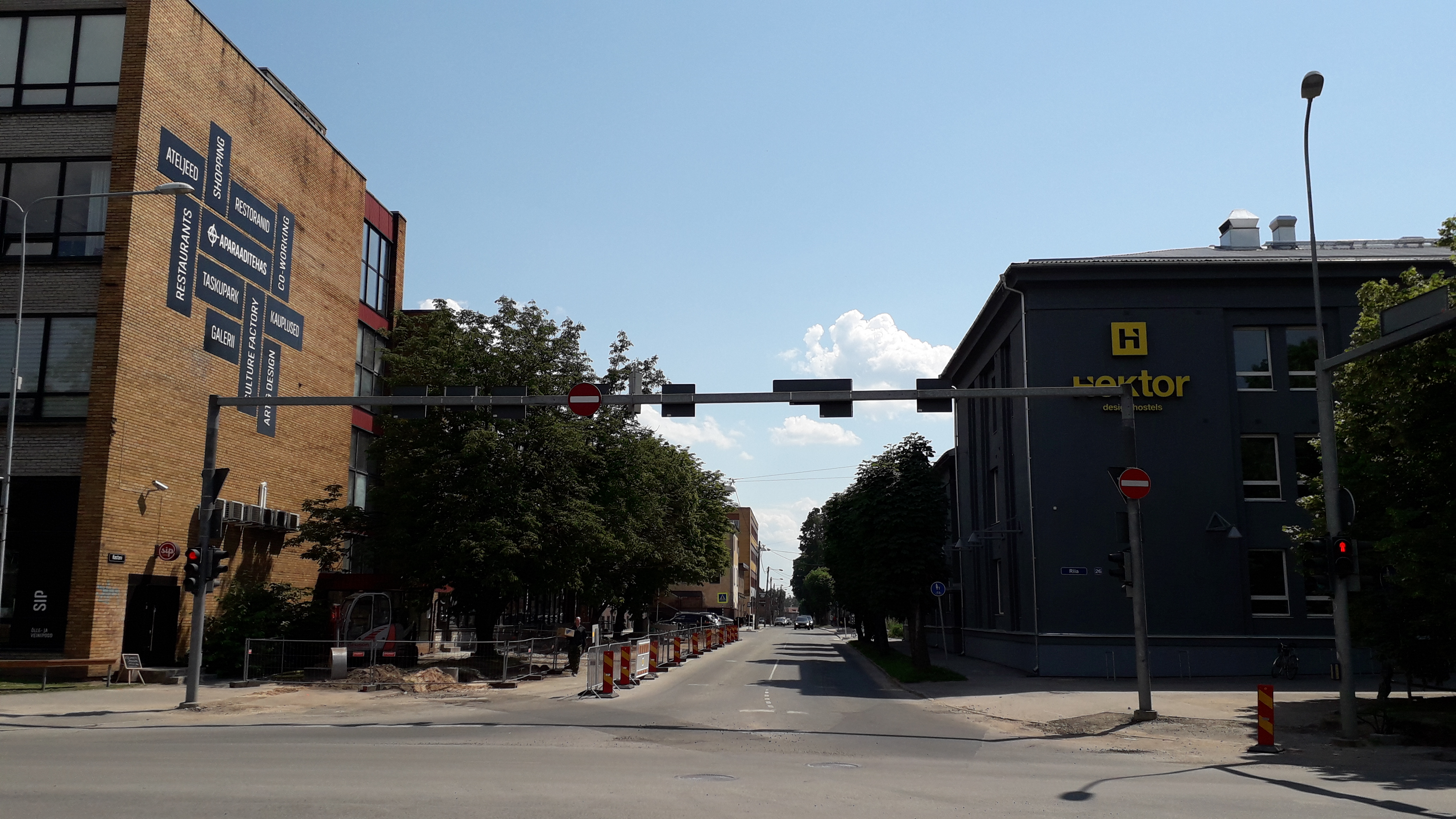
Kastani tänav

== See also ==
- Tartu railway station
