= Rail transport in Estonia =

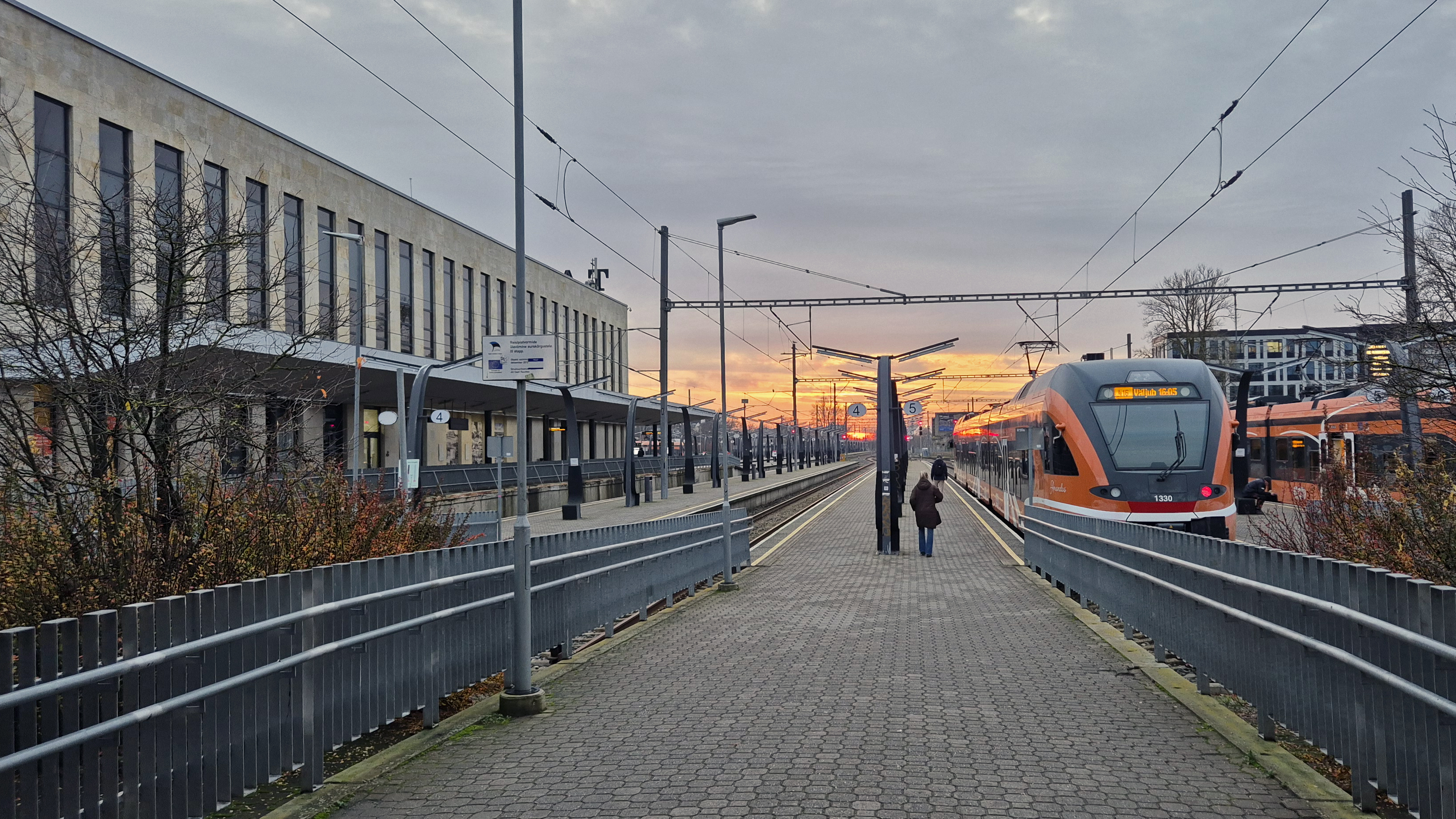
Balti jaam (literally the Baltic Station) is the main passenger railway station of Estonia's capital Tallinn.

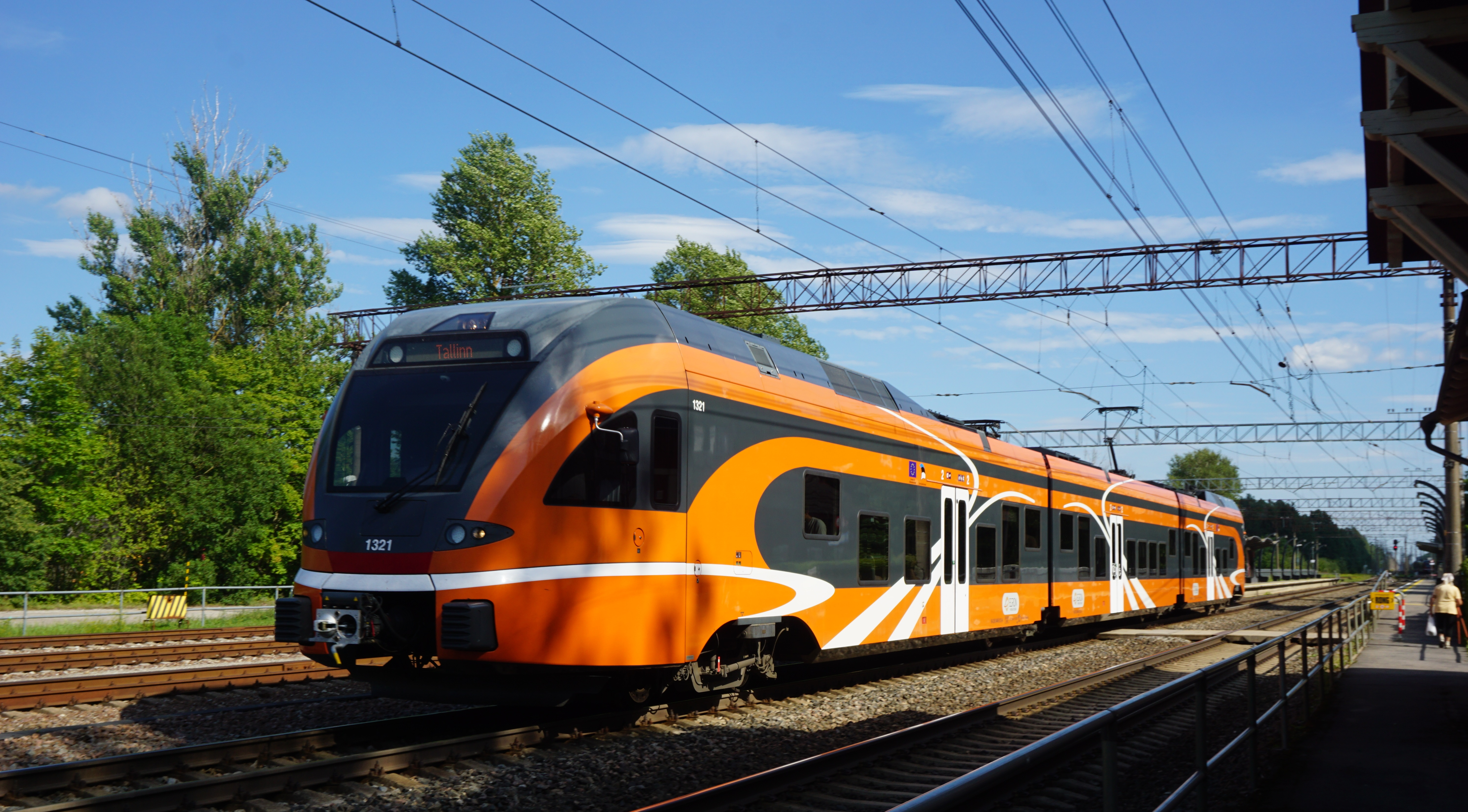
Stadler FLIRT in Kehra.

The rail transport system in Estonia consists of about 1,200 kilometres (750 mi) of railway lines, of which 900 kilometres (560 mi) are currently in public use. The infrastructure of the railway network is mostly owned by the state and is regulated and surveyed by the Estonian Consumer Protection and Technical Regulatory Authority (Estonian: Tarbijakaitse ja Tehnilise Järelevalve Amet).

All public railways in Estonia are 1,520 mm (4 ft 11 27/32 in) (Russian gauge), the same as in Russia, Belarus, Latvia, and Lithuania. The 1,520 mm gauge used in Estonia is also compatible with Finland's 1,524 mm (5 ft) gauge. Sometimes it is defined to be 1,524 mm (see Rail gauge in Estonia), for example when buying track maintenance or vehicles from Finland.

Railways in Estonia today are used mostly for passenger traffic, with 8.3 million passengers reported in 2019. Passenger transport is most frequent near Tallinn, centred on the main Tallinn Baltic Station. Estonian railways are also used for freight transport, but the freight volumes have decreased significantly due to the disappearance of freight traffic from Russia after 2022.

The Tallinn to Tartu railway is due to be electrified by 2026, with electrification of the remaining network expected to be completed by 2028. 16 new electric trains manufactured by Škoda Transportation are due to come into service starting 2025, with the first having arrived in Estonia in June 2024.

== Network ==
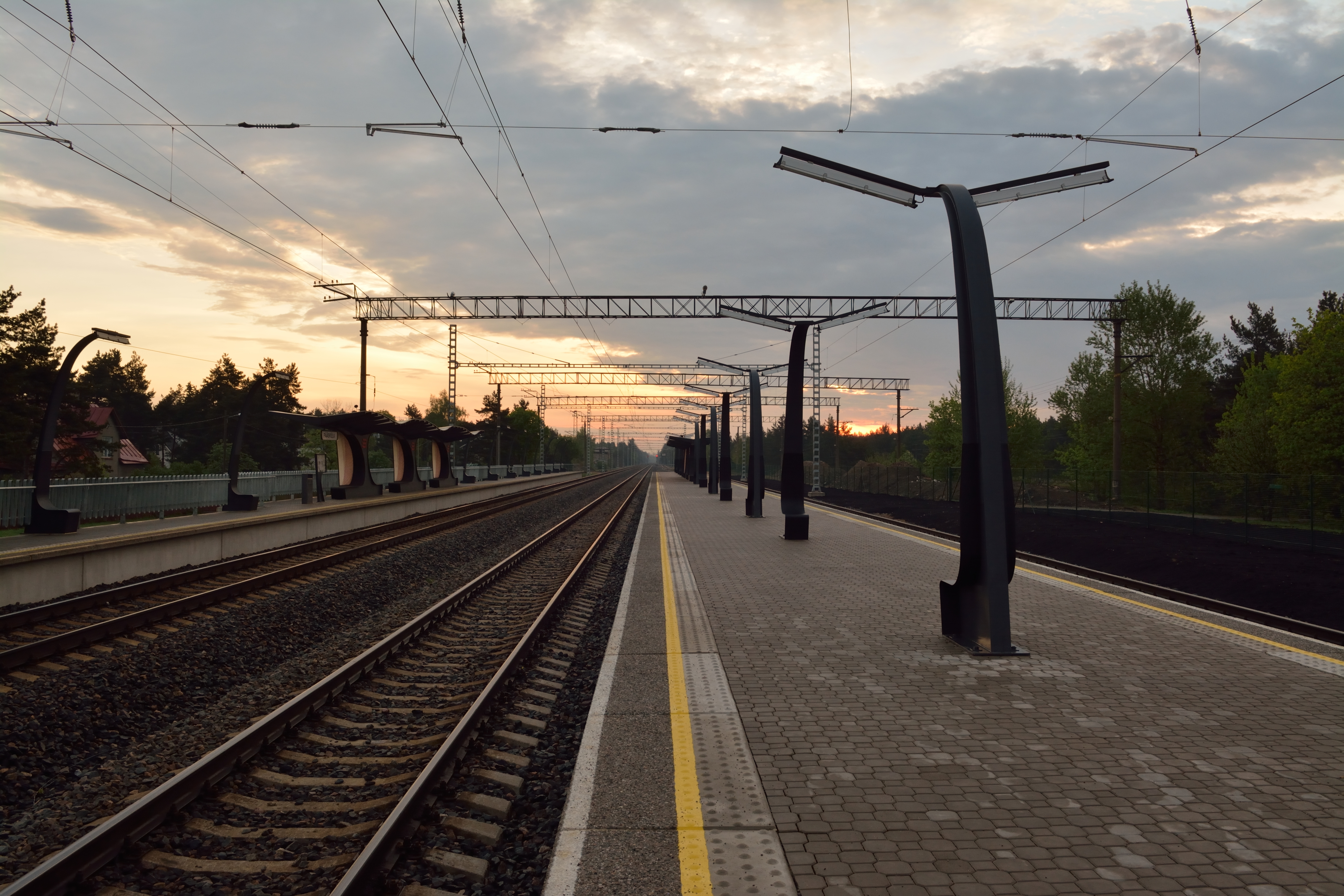
Pääsküla railway station

- Total length: circa 1,200 km (750 mi), of which 900 km (560 mi) in public use
- Gauge: 1,524 mm (5 ft) Russian gauge
- Electrified: 133 km (83 mi).

The Estonian railway network is owned by the state-owned company AS Eesti Raudtee and the private company Edelaraudtee Infrastruktuuri AS. These railway network infrastructure operators provide all railway network services for railway operators running freight and passenger services. AS Eesti Raudtee provides approximately 800 kilometres (500 mi) of track, of which 107 kilometres (66 mi) is double track and 133 kilometres (83 mi) is electrified. Edelaraudtee Infrastruktuuri AS maintains 298 kilometres (185 mi) of track which consists of 219 kilometres (136 mi) of main line and 79 kilometres (49 mi) of station line.

=== Main lines ===
Railway lines in public use as of 2015.

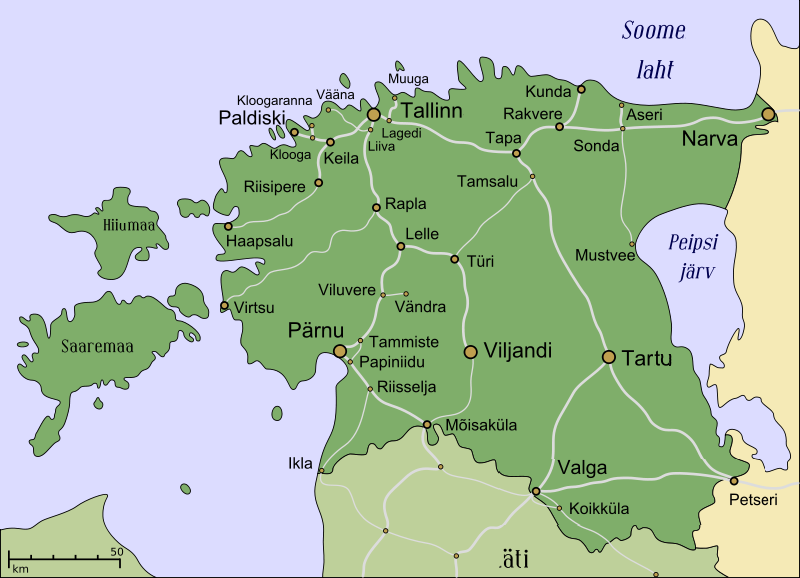
All railway lines in Estonia (including demolished)

Frequency of passenger trains, 2016.

Electrified railway lines, 2016.

Owned by AS Eesti Raudtee:

- Tallinn–Narva railway, 209.6 km (130.2 mi). This line was completed in 1870. It was originally a part of the railway network of the Russian Empire, connecting Paldiski to St. Petersburg via Tallinn and Narva.
  Passenger trains are operated by Elron (Tallinn–Aegviidu, Tallinn–Tartu, Tallinn–Rakvere and Tallinn–Narva routes) and until 2020 by GO Rail (international trains to Moscow and St. Petersburg, Russia).
- Tallinn–Keila–Paldiski, 47.7 km (29.6 mi). Passenger trains are operated by Elron (Tallinn–Pääsküla, Tallinn–Keila, Tallinn–Paldiski and Tallinn–Klooga-rand routes).
- Keila–Turba, Estonia, 24.4 km (15.2 mi). This line is part of the former Keila–Haapsalu line, that was completed in 1905. The Riisipere–Haapsalu section was abandoned in 2004, but rebuilt as far as Turba during 2019, as a first step towards eventually re-opening the line to Haapsalu (and possibly the port at Rohuküla ). Passenger trains are operated by Elron (Tallinn–Turba route).
- Tapa–Tartu, 112.5 km (69.9 mi). Completed in 1877.
  Passenger trains are operated by Elron (Tallinn–Tartu and Tartu–Jõgeva routes).
- Tartu–Valga, 82.5km. Completed in 1887. International connection from Valga in Estonia to Valka in Latvia.
  Passenger trains between Tartu and Valga are operated by Elron. Passenger trains between Valga and Riga are operated by Latvian Railways.
- Tartu–Pechory, 83.5 km (51.9 mi). Built between 1929 and 1931. International connection from Koidula railway station (Koidula) in Estonia to Pechory in Russia. Passenger trains are operated by Elron (Tartu–Koidula route).
- Valga–Pechory, 91.5 km (56.9 mi). Part of Riga–Pskov railway, opened to regular traffic in 1889. International connection from Koidula railway station in Estonia to Pechory in Russia. The line is used only by freight trains, as it was shut down with most other lines in 2001, but was not re-opened.

Owned by Edelaraudtee Infrastruktuuri AS:

- Tallinn–Lelle–(Pärnu), 141.4 km (87.9 mi) (formerly 190.0km). The Lelle-Pärnu section was permanently closed for passenger operations on 8 December 2018 as it required a €17 million refurbishment. A rail service to Pärnu station will be resumed with the opening of the Rail Baltica line. There was an international connection from Mõisaküla to Latvia, however trains stopped running to Mõisaküla in 1996. The stretch Pärnu–Mõisaküla was abandoned in 2008.
- Lelle–Viljandi, 78.7 km (48.9 mi). This line connects Viljandi to the Tallinn–Pärnu line via Lelle. Passenger service remains on the route.

=== Major industrial railways ===
- Põlevkivi Raudtee (oil shale railway) maintains over 200 km (120 mi) of track in Ida-Virumaa. Main use of the network is transporting oil shale from underground and open-cast mines to the Narva Power Plants. The company is a subsidiary of Eesti Põlevkivi, which itself is a subsidiary of Eesti Energia, owned by the state.
- Rakvere–Kunda, 19 km (12 mi). Built in 1896, this line connects the industrial town of Kunda to the Tallinn–Tapa–Narva line. The line is owned by private company Kunda Trans.

=== Future expansion ===
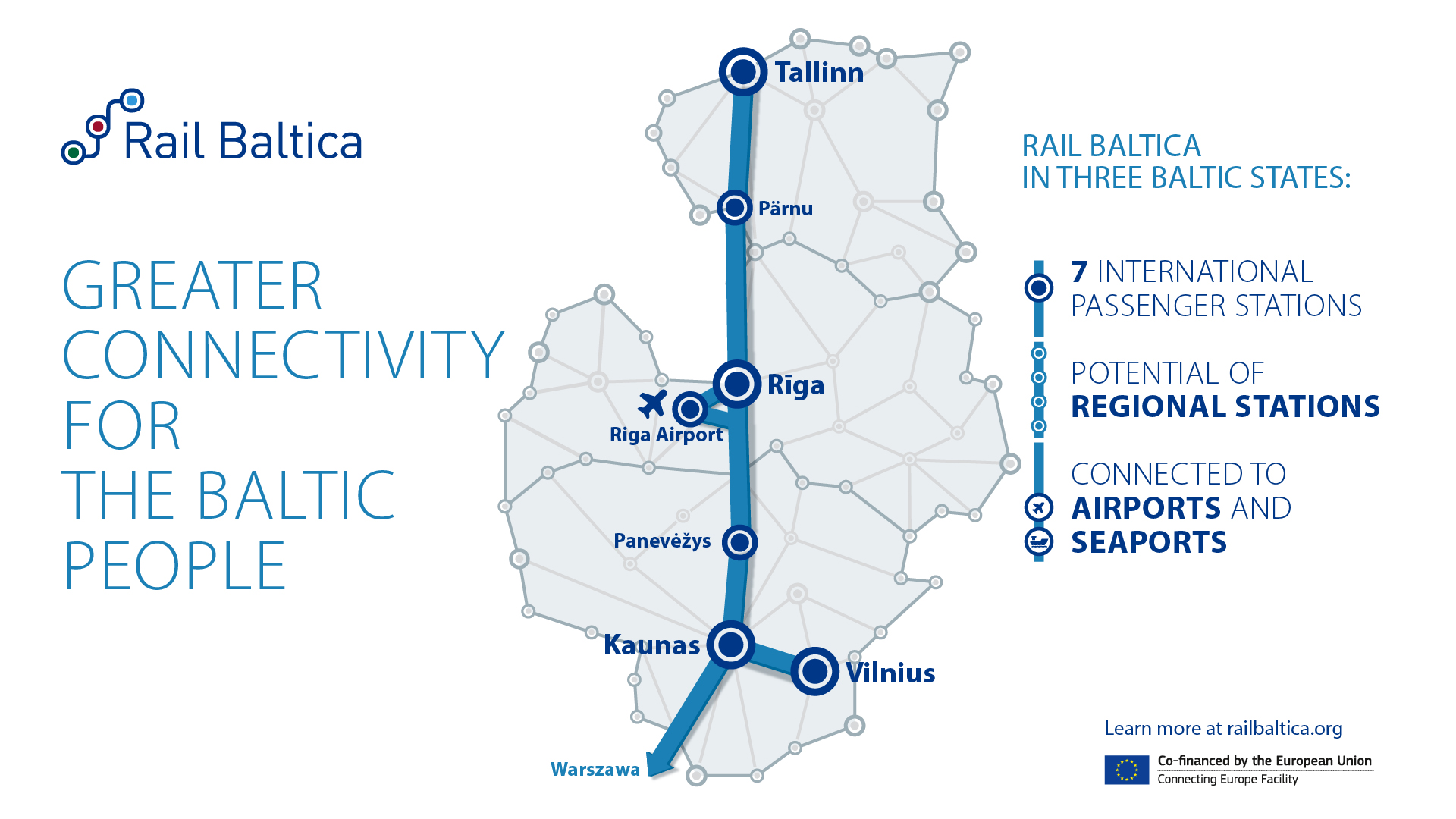

Rail Baltica is an ongoing greenfield railway infrastructure project which will link all Baltic States, including Estonia, Poland and, eventually, Finland. Being a part of the Trans-European Transport Networks (TEN-T), it is one of the priority projects of the European Union. It will introduce standard-gauge high-speed rail with an operating speed of 249 km/h (155 mph) for passenger trains.

As of 2023, the Rail Baltica project completion is scheduled for 2030, with a start of services on some of the sections in 2028.

=== Conversion to Standard Gauge ===
A 2022 European Union proposal for all new rail lines to be Standard Gauge and a rolling plan introduced to convert other gauges to Standard would cost Estonia an estimated €8.7 billion which raises questions over cost/benefit.

== Connections to adjacent countries ==
Until 2022, daily passenger service connected Tallinn with Moscow (night train; travel time is 15 hours) through Narva and Saint Petersburg and was operated by the Russian Railways.

As of autumn 2025, up to three daily trains operated by Latvian Railways connect Valga in Estonia to Riga in Latvia. One train per day continues all the way to Vilnius, Lithuania, with a possibility to continue next day to Poland. It is possible to travel between Tallinn, Riga and Vilnius on a single ticket and with a single train change at Valga, and the timetables of Tallinn–Valga and Valga–Riga(–Vilnius) are adjusted for that purpose, but this still takes a long time compared to buses or flights.

The other railway lines to neighbouring countries are not used for direct passenger traffic at the moment. Historic train routes are Tallinn–Moscow via Tartu and Pechory, and Riga–St. Petersburg via Valga, Võru, Piusa and Pechory. Both were closed in the 1990s.

A new high-speed line Tallinn–Warsaw known as Rail Baltica is currently under construction and is planned to be in operation in 2030. There have also been further proposals to construct a railway tunnel between Tallinn and Helsinki, Finland.

=== Railway links with adjacent countries ===
- Same gauge:
  - Latvia – yes
    - at Valga – diesel trains only
  - Russia – yes
    - at Narva – diesel trains only
    - at Koidula – diesel trains only

== Operators ==
Freight trains are operated by Eesti Raudtee and private companies including Estonian Railway Services (E.R.S. AS), and Spacecom.

Passenger services are offered by three operators:

- Elron, domestic routes
- Vivi, Valga–Riga
- LTG Link, Valga–Riga–Vilnius

== See also ==
- Narrow gauge railways in Estonia
- Rail Baltica
- Rail transport by country
- Transport in Estonia
