= 5 ft and 1520 mm gauge railways =

Railway track gauge

Railways with a railway track gauge of 5 ft (1,524 mm) first appeared in the United Kingdom and the United States. This gauge became commonly known as "Russian gauge", because the government of the Russian Empire chose it in 1843. Former areas and states (such as Finland) of the Empire have inherited this standard. However, in 1970, Soviet Railways redefined the gauge as 1,520 mm (4 ft 11 27/32 in).

With about 225,000 km (140,000 mi) of track, 1,520 mm is the second-most common gauge in the world, after 1,435 mm (4 ft 8 1/2 in) standard gauge.

== History ==
=== Great Britain, 1748 ===
In 1748, the Wylam waggonway was built to a 5 ft (1,524 mm) gauge for the shipment of coal from Wylam to Lemington down the River Tyne.

In 1839, the Eastern Counties Railway was constructed. In 1840, the Northern and Eastern Railway was built. In 1844, both lines were converted to 1,435 mm (4 ft 8 1/2 in) standard gauge. In 1903, the East Hill Cliff Railway, a funicular, was opened.

=== United States, 1827 ===
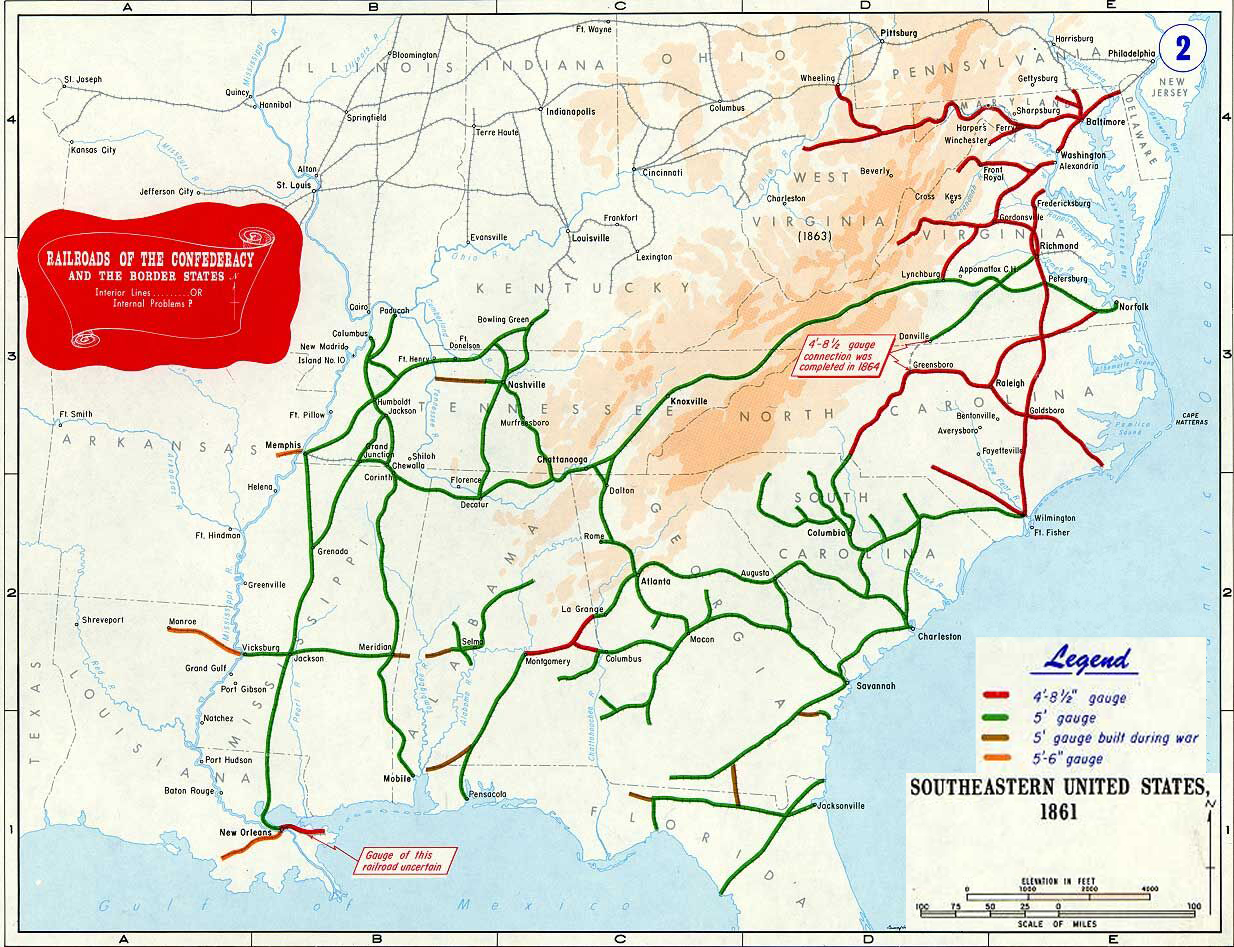
5 ft (1,524 mm) gauge rail network in the Southern United States (1861)

In 1827, Horatio Allen, the chief engineer of the South Carolina Canal and Rail Road Company, prescribed the usage of 5 ft (1,524 mm) gauge. Many other railroads in the Southern United States adopted this gauge. The presence of several distinct gauges was a major disadvantage to the Confederate States of America during the American Civil War. In 1886, when around 11,500 miles (18,500 km) of 5 ft gauge track existed in the United States, almost all of the railroads using that gauge were converted to 4 ft 9 in (1,448 mm), the gauge then used by the Pennsylvania Railroad.

=== Russian Empire, 1842 ===
In 1837, the first railway built in Russia was a 6 ft (1,829 mm) gauge, 17 km long experimental line connecting Saint Petersburg with Tsarskoye Selo and Pavlovsk. The choice of gauge was influenced by Brunel's Great Western Railway which used 7 ft (2,134 mm). The Tsarskoye Selo railway's success proved that a larger gauge could be viable for railways isolated from the extant 1,435 mm (4 ft 8 1/2 in) gauge Western European network.

In 1840, work started on the second railway in the Russian Empire, the Warsaw–Vienna railway in Congress Poland. It was a 1,435 mm (4 ft 8 1/2 in) standard gauge, with the express intention of allowing through-freight trains into Austria-Hungary.

The modern Russian railway network solidified around the Saint Petersburg–Moscow railway, built in 1842. There, the Tsar established a committee to recommend technical standards for the building of Russia's first major railway. The team included devotees of Franz Anton von Gerstner, who pushed to continue the Tsarskoye Selo gauge, and engineer Pavel Melnikov and his consultant George Washington Whistler, a prominent American railway engineer. Whistler recommended 5 ft (1,524 mm) on the basis that it was cheaper to construct than 6 ft (1,829 mm) and cheaper to maintain than 1,435 mm (4 ft 8 1/2 in). His advice won over the Tsar.

At the time, questions of continuity with the European network did not arise. By the time difficulties arose in connecting the Prussian railroads to the Russian ones in Warsaw in the 1850s, it was too late to change.

A persistent myth holds that Imperial Russia chose a gauge broader than standard gauge for military reasons, namely to prevent potential invaders from using the rail system. (Note: Lotysz, Slawomir. "Narrowing is easier". Inventing Europe. Contrary to Lotysz's claim that "some railway historians" promote the myth, its only trace in the academic literature appears to be persistent warnings against the folklore. See, e.g., Haywood 1969 or Siddall 1969.) The Russian military recognized as early as 1841 that operations to disrupt railway track did not depend on the gauge, and should instead focus on destroying bridges and tunnels. However, in both World Wars the break of gauge did pose some amount of obstacle to the invading Germans.

==== Expansion ====
The 5-foot gauge became the standard in the Russian Empire and later the Soviet Union.

Russian engineers used it on the Chinese Eastern Railway, built in the closing years of the 19th century across the Northeastern China entry to provide a shortcut for the Trans-Siberian Railway to Vladivostok. The railway's southern branch, from Harbin via Changchun to Lüshun, used Russian gauge. As a result of the Russo-Japanese War of 1904–1905, its southernmost section from Changchun to Lüshun was lost to the Japanese, who promptly regauged it to standard gauge, after using the narrow 3 ft 6 in (1,067 mm) for a short time during the war. This formed a break of gauge between Changchun and Kuancheng, the station just to the north of Changchun, still in Russian hands, until the rest of the former Chinese Eastern Railway was converted to standard gauge, probably in the 1930s.

Unlike in South Manchuria, the Soviet Union's reconquest of southern Sakhalin from Japan did not result in immediate regauging of the railway system. Southern Sakhalin continued with the original Japanese 1,067 mm (3 ft 6 in) gauge, simultaneously with the Russian gauge railway, constructed in the northern part of the island in 1930-1932 (Moskalvo-Okha). Sakhalin's railway network has no fixed connection with the mainland. Before 2019, rail cars coming from the mainland port of Vanino on the Vanino-Kholmsk train ferry, operating since 1973, had to have their bogies changed in the Sakhalin port of Kholmsk. In 2004 and 2008 plans were put forward to convert the island's railway network to the Russian gauge. The conversion was completed in 2019.

There were proposals in 2013 for north–south and east–west lines in Afghanistan, with construction to start in 2013.

=== Panama, 1850 ===
The Panama Canal Railway, first constructed in ca. 1850, was built in 5 ft (1,524 mm) gauge. During canal construction (1904–1914), this same gauge was chosen for both construction traffic, canal operating services along the quays, and the newly routed commercial cross-isthmus railway. In 2000 the gauge for the commercial parallel railway was changed to 1,435 mm (4 ft 8 1/2 in) to use standard gauge equipment. The original gauge was chosen under the influence of the pre-conversion southern United States railway companies. The electric manoeuvering locomotives along the locks (mules) still use the 5 ft gauge that was laid during canal construction.

=== Finland, 1862 ===
The first rail line in Finland was opened in January 1862. As Finland was a grand duchy within the Russian Empire, railways were also built to the (5 ft) broad track gauge of 1,524 mm (5 ft). However the railway systems were not connected until the bridge over the River Neva was built in 1913. Russian trains could not have run on Finnish tracks, because the Finnish loading gauge was narrower, until the connection was made and the Finnish structure gauge was widened.

== Technical ==
=== Redefinitions ===
In the late 1960s the gauge was redefined to 1,520 mm (4 ft 11 27/32 in) in the Soviet Union. At the same time the tolerances were tightened. As the running gear (wheelsets) of the rolling stock remained unaltered, the result was an increased speed and stability. The conversion took place between 1970 and the beginning of the 1990s.

In Finland, the Finnish State Railways kept the original definition of 1,524 mm (5 ft), even though they also have tightened the tolerances in a similar way, but to a higher level.

After its independence from the Soviet Union in 1991, Estonia redefined its track gauge to 1,524 mm, to match Finland's gauge. The redefinition did not mean that all the railways in Estonia were changed immediately. It was more a rule change, so that all renovated old tracks and new railways would be constructed in 1,524 mm gauge from then on. (See Track gauge in Estonia.)

=== Tolerances ===
Finland allows its gauge to be 1,520–1,529 mm on first class lines (classes 1AA and 1A, speed 220–160 km/h).

If the rolling stock's tolerance is kept within certain limits, through running between 1,520 mm (4 ft 11 27/32 in) railways and Finnish 1,524 mm (5 ft) railways is allowed. Since both 1,520 and 1,524 mm tolerances overlap, the difference is negligible. The international high-speed Allegro's gauge between Helsinki and St. Petersburg was specified as 1,522 mm.

=== Loading gauge ===
The loading gauge, which defines the maximum height and width for railway vehicles and their loads, is larger for Russian gauge. This means that if a standard gauge railway, in Europe, is adapted for dual gauge, bridges must be rebuilt, double tracks must be placed further apart and the overhead wire must be raised. Or there must be restrictions on permitted rolling stock, which would restrict the benefit of such a railway. Dual gauge needs more width than single gauge. For double stacking on Russian gauge tracks, maximum height shall be 6.15 or 6.4 m (20 ft 2 in or 21 ft 0 in) above rails.

For standard gauge railways, double stacking maximum height shall be 6.15 m (20 ft 2 in). For Indian gauge railways, double stacking maximum height shall be 7.1 m (23 ft 4 in), and minimum overhead wiring height shall be 6.5 or 6.75 m (21 ft 4 in or 22 ft 2 in) above rails. Minimum overhead wiring height for double stacking, standard gauge railways shall be 6.5 m (21 ft 4 in), and Indian gauge railways shall be 7.45 m (24 ft 5 in) above rails, respectively. This would apply to Russia and Europe (or North America), rather than to Russia and China (or Iran).

== Current status ==
=== Primary usage ===
The primary countries currently using the gauge of 5 ft or 1,520 mm, include:

- Armenia
- Azerbaijan
- Belarus
- Estonia
- Finland (5 ft gauge)
- Georgia
- Kazakhstan
- Kyrgyzstan
- Latvia
- Lithuania
- Moldova
- Mongolia
- Russia
- Tajikistan
- Turkmenistan
- Ukraine
- Uzbekistan

=== Extended usage ===
Short sections of Russian or 5 ft gauge extend into Poland, eastern Slovakia, Sweden (at the Finnish border at Haparanda), and northern Afghanistan.

There is an approximately 150 km long section in Hungary in the Záhony logistics area close to the Ukrainian border.

Following renovations in 2014, a 32 km section of dual Standard/Russian gauge was installed between Tumangang and Rajin stations in North Korea.

The most western 1,520 mm gauge railway is the Polish LHS (Linia Hutnicza Szerokotorowa) from the Ukrainian border to the eastern end of the Upper Silesian Industrial Region.

=== Use in rapid transit and light rail systems ===
Although broad gauge is quite rare on lighter railways and street tramways worldwide, almost all tramways in the former USSR are broad gauge (according to terminology in use in these countries, gauges narrower than 1,520 mm (4 ft 11 27/32 in) are considered to be narrow). Many tramway networks initially built to narrow gauges (750 mm or 2 ft 5 1/2 in or 1,000 mm or 3 ft 3 3/8 in metre gauge) were converted to broad gauge. As of 2015, only a few out of more than sixty tram systems in Russia are not broad gauge: 1,000 mm in Kaliningrad and Pyatigorsk, 1,435 mm (4 ft 8 1/2 in) in Rostov-on-Don. There are two tram systems in and around Yevpatoria that use 1,000 mm (3 ft 3 3/8 in) gauge. (Note: Yevpatoria is located in Crimea, a territory disputed between Ukraine (as the Autonomous Republic of Crimea) and Russia (as the Republic of Crimea) since the March 2014 Crimean status referendum.)

Finland's Helsinki trams and Latvia's Liepāja trams use 1,000 mm (3 ft 3 3/8 in). Estonia's Tallinn trams use similar 1,067 mm (3 ft 6 in). Warsaw's tramway system, constructed with 1525 mm gauge, was regauged to 1435 mm during post-WWII reconstruction. Tampere tramway, built in 2021, uses 1,435 mm (4 ft 8 1/2 in).

Underground urban rapid transit systems in the former USSR, like the Moscow Metro, Saint Petersburg Metro, Kyiv Metro and Yerevan Metro use Russian gauge (1,520 mm). Outside the former USSR, the Helsinki Metro in Finland uses a unique track gauge of 1,522 mm, falls between the Russian gauge (1,520 mm) and broad gauge 1,524 mm.

== Similar gauges ==
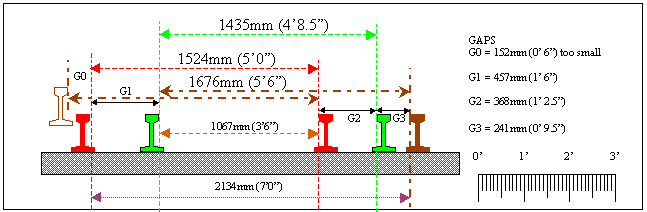
Mixed between 1,524 mm (5 ft) and another similar gauge, result the bonus gauge is 7 ft (2,134 mm) (Brunel gauge).

These gauges cannot make 3-rail dual gauge with Russian gauge.

- 1,676 mm (5 ft 6 in) Indian gauge
- 1,668 mm (5 ft 5 21/32 in) Iberian gauge
- 1,600 mm (5 ft 3 in) Irish gauge
- 1,435 mm (4 ft 8 1/2 in) standard gauge

These gauges are within tolerance.

- 1,520 mm (4 ft 11 27/32 in) Russian gauge
- 1,522 mm (4 ft 11 29/32 in) as used by Helsinki Metro
- 1,524 mm (5 ft)

Dual gauge between Russian gauge and another similar gauge can make these bonus gauges.

- 1,829 mm (6 ft)
- 1,945 mm (6 ft 4 9/16 in)
- 2,134 mm (7 ft)
- 2,140 mm (7 ft 1/4 in) (Brunel gauge)
- 2,503 mm (8 ft 2 1/2 in) (the maximum bonus gauge from the 1,435 mm (4 ft 8 1/2 in) standard gauge gauntlet tracks).

== Summary ==
=== Railways using 1,524 mm gauge ===
Country/territory	Railway
China	Chinese Eastern Railway (until 1930s)
Finland	Rail transport in Finland (except: Helsinki Metro uses 1,522 mm (4 ft 11 29/32 in), and Tampere tram uses standard gauge (1,435 mm))
Iran	Proposed for the south and east of Tehran and the north and east of Estafan. The 1,676 mm (5 ft 6 in) Indian gauge is proposed for the east of Kerman, the south of Mashhad, and the north and east of Chabahar, whereas the north and west of Tehran and the south and west of Estafan will continue the 1,435 mm (4 ft 8 1/2 in) standard gauge.
Isle of Man	Laxey Browside Tramway (closed by 1914), Second Falcon Cliff lift (closed 1990)
Japan	Sakhalin-Hokkaido tunnel (proposed), with the break-of-gauge facilities between 5 ft (1,524 mm) and 1,435 mm (4 ft 8 1/2 in) in Northern Hokkaido.
Norway	Proposed for Kolari-Skibotn-Tromsø and Nikel-Kirkenes-Rovaniemi lines.
Panama	Panama Canal Railway prior to conversion to standard gauge in 2000 to suit off-the-shelf supply.
Sweden	Only a short stretch at the station and a small freight yard in Haparanda. Used for exchanging passengers and cargo with Finnish trains.
United States	The South, such as the Cartersville and Van Wert Railroad, the Cherokee Railroad, and the Western & Atlantic Railroad, until 31 May 1886. The Duquesne Incline and Monongahela Incline in Pittsburgh, Pennsylvania.

=== Railways using 1,520 mm gauge ===
Country/territory	Railway
Afghanistan	Rail transport in Afghanistan: The northern spur lines from CIS states. For Afghanistan's future network, the 1,435 mm (4 ft 8 1/2 in) standard gauge is used for the western spur line from Iran to Herat; for the trans-Afghanistan line from the Uzbekistan border to the Pakistan border, the 1,676 mm (5 ft 6 in) Indian gauge was proposed, but in 2025 the country's government stated that the Russian gauge would be used.
Armenia	Armenian Railways, South Caucasus Railway
Austria	Košice-Vienna broad-gauge line (proposed)
Azerbaijan	Azerbaijan Railways
Belarus	Rail transport in Belarus
Bulgaria	Only at Varna ferry terminal for train ferries to Odesa and Poti; dual gauge track for changing wagon bogies with standard gauge ones, and parallel transhipping tracks of 1,520 mm and 1,435 mm (4 ft 8 1/2 in) gauge.
China	Several short stretches from Russia, Mongolia and Kazakhstan.
Estonia	Rail transport in Estonia
France	A short section linking the assembly building to the Soyuz launcher launch pad, at the Guiana Space Center.
Georgia	Georgian Railway
Germany	Only at Sassnitz/Mukran ferry terminal for freight train ferries to Turku, Klaipėda and Baltijsk.
Hong Kong	Peak Tram
Kazakhstan	Kazakhstan Temir Zholy
Kyrgyzstan	Kyrgyz Railways
Latvia	Rail transport in Latvia
Lithuania	Rail transport in Lithuania
Moldova	CFM
Mongolia	Rail transport in Mongolia
North Korea	A 32-km stretch of 1,435/1,520 mm dual gauge between Tumangang and Rajin Stations.
Poland	Almost exclusively on the Broad Gauge Metallurgy Line.
Russia	Russian Railways
Slovakia	Only on the "Širokorozchodná trať" (Uzhhorod - Maťovce - Haniska pri Košiciach) and from the border station of Dobrá pri Čiernej nad Tisou to Ukraine, both operated by ZSSK Cargo.
Tajikistan	Rail transport in Tajikistan: Most in the West; Also 1,676 mm (5 ft 6 in) Indian gauge is proposed for the East.
Turkmenistan	Railways in Turkmenistan
Ukraine	Ukrainian Railways
Uzbekistan	Uzbek Railways

== See also ==
- The Museum of the Moscow Railway
- History of rail transport in Azerbaijan
- History of rail transport in Belarus
- History of rail transport in Estonia
- History of rail transport in Finland
- History of rail transport in Latvia
- History of rail transport in Lithuania
- History of rail transport in Russia
- History of rail transport in Turkmenistan
- History of rail transport in Ukraine
- Rail transport in Armenia
- Rail transport in Azerbaijan
- Rail transport in Belarus
- Rail transport in Estonia
- Rail transport in Finland
- Rail transport in Kazakhstan
- Rail transport in Kyrgyzstan
- Rail transport in Latvia
- Rail transport in Lithuania
- Rail transport in Moldova
- Rail transport in Mongolia
- Rail transport in Russia
- Rail transport in Tajikistan
- Rail transport in Turkmenistan
- Rail transport in Ukraine
- Rail transport in Uzbekistan
- Track gauge in Estonia
