= Tartu railway station =

Railway station in Tartu, Estonia

Tartu
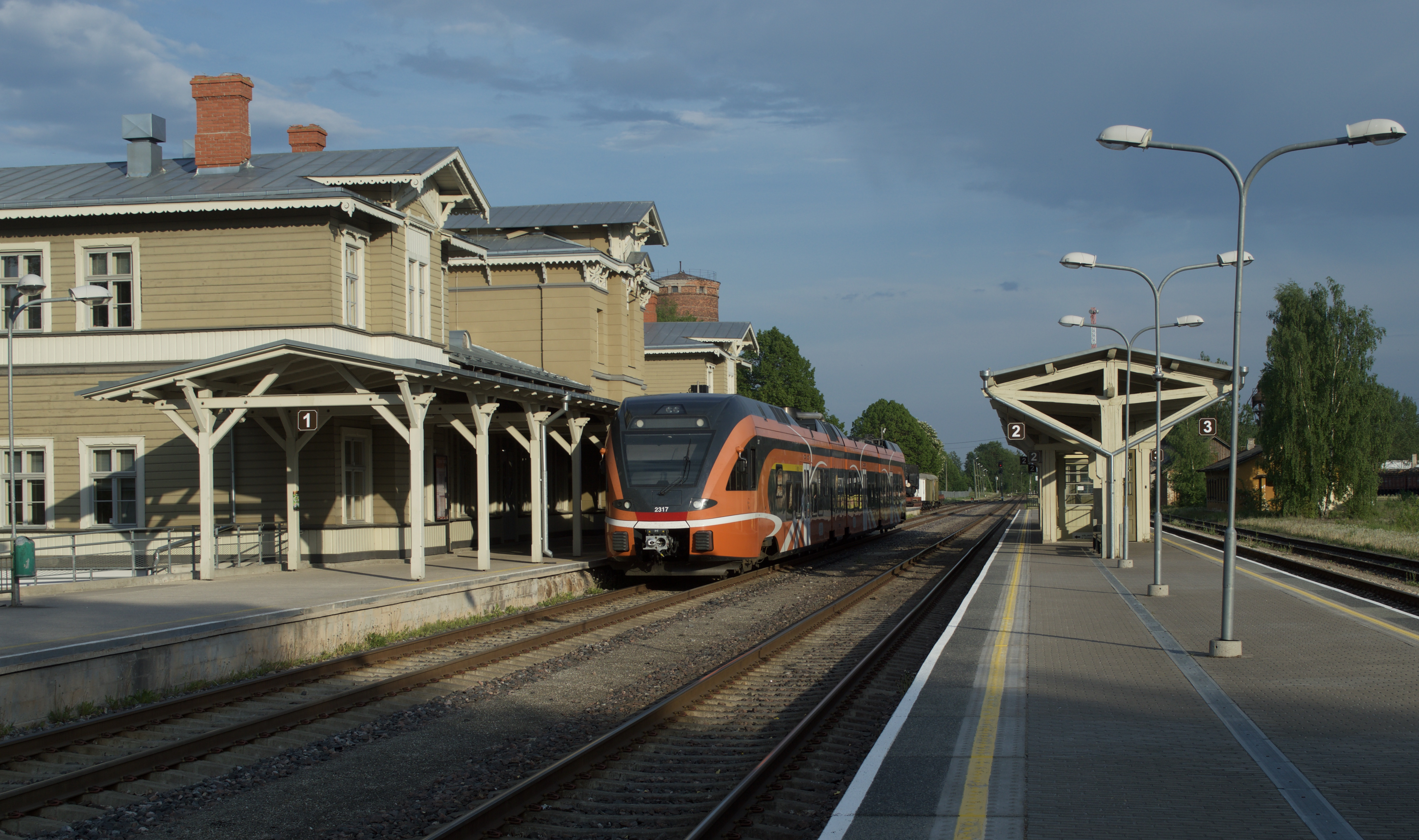

General information
- Location: Vaksali 6, 50409 Tartu; Estonia
- Coordinates: 58°22′25.76″N 26°42′24.61″E
- System: railway station
- Owner: Eesti Raudtee
- Platforms: 2
- Tracks: 3
- Train operators: Elron
- Connections: Buses 3 10 21 22 25

Construction
- Structure type: at-grade
- Cycle facilities: Outside the station
- Accessible: yes

Other information
- Fare zone: Tartu Zone

History
- Opened: 1877

Services
Preceding station	Elron	Following station
Kärkna towards Tallinn	Tallinn–Tartu–Valga	Aardla towards Valga
Kärkna towards Tallinn	Tallinn–Tartu–Koidula	Kirsi towards Koidula
Location
- Location within Estonia

Tartu railway station (Estonian: Tartu raudteejaam) is a railway station in Tartu, Estonia.

Tartu railway station is situated west of the centre Tartu. It was established in 1876 when Tapa–Tartu route was built. The station building was opened in 1877.

Passenger trains are operated by Elron. There are services towards Tallinn, Valga, Koidula and during summertimes to Piusa.

There are two platforms with the length of 260m and 330m.

== Gallery ==
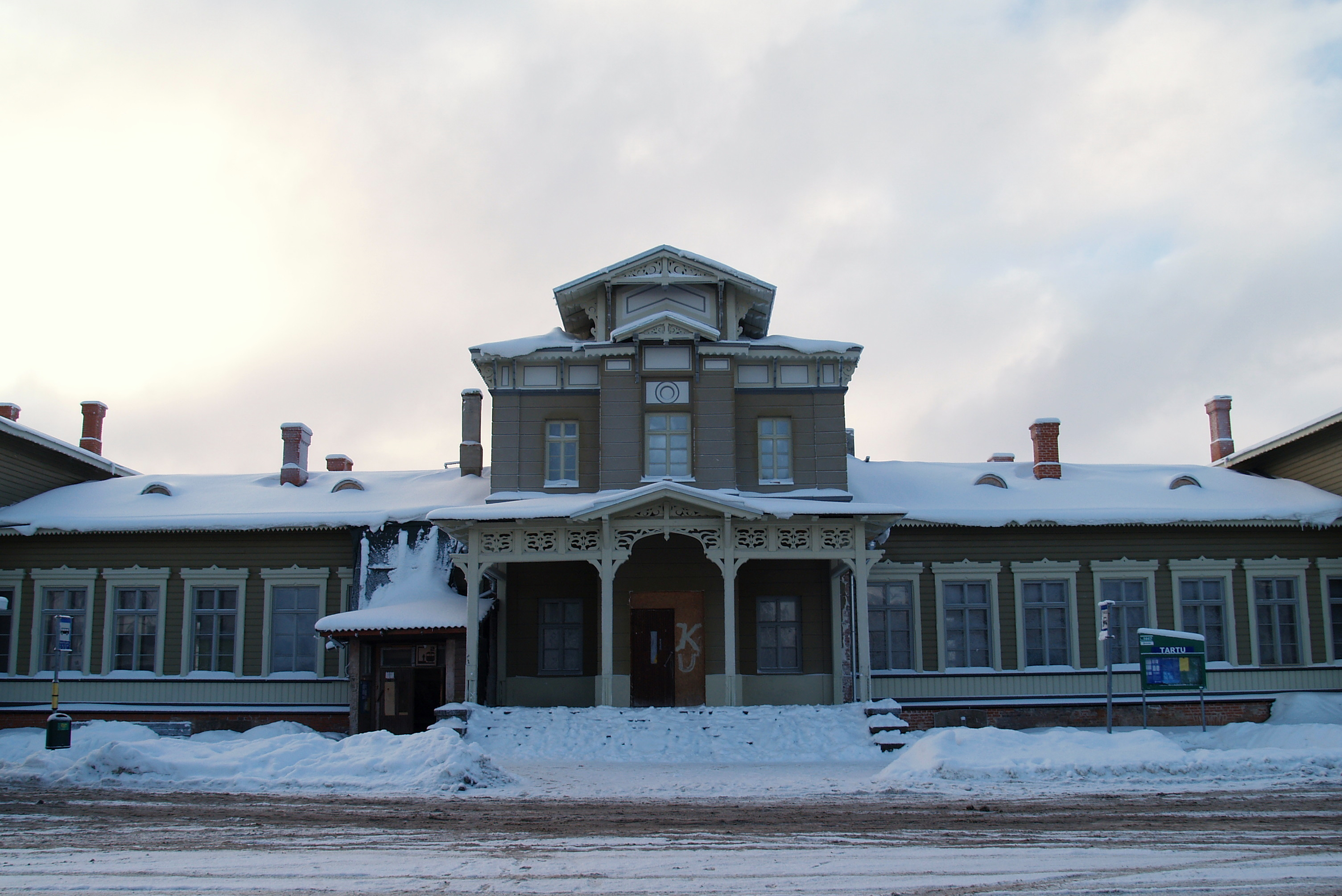
The station building from the city side

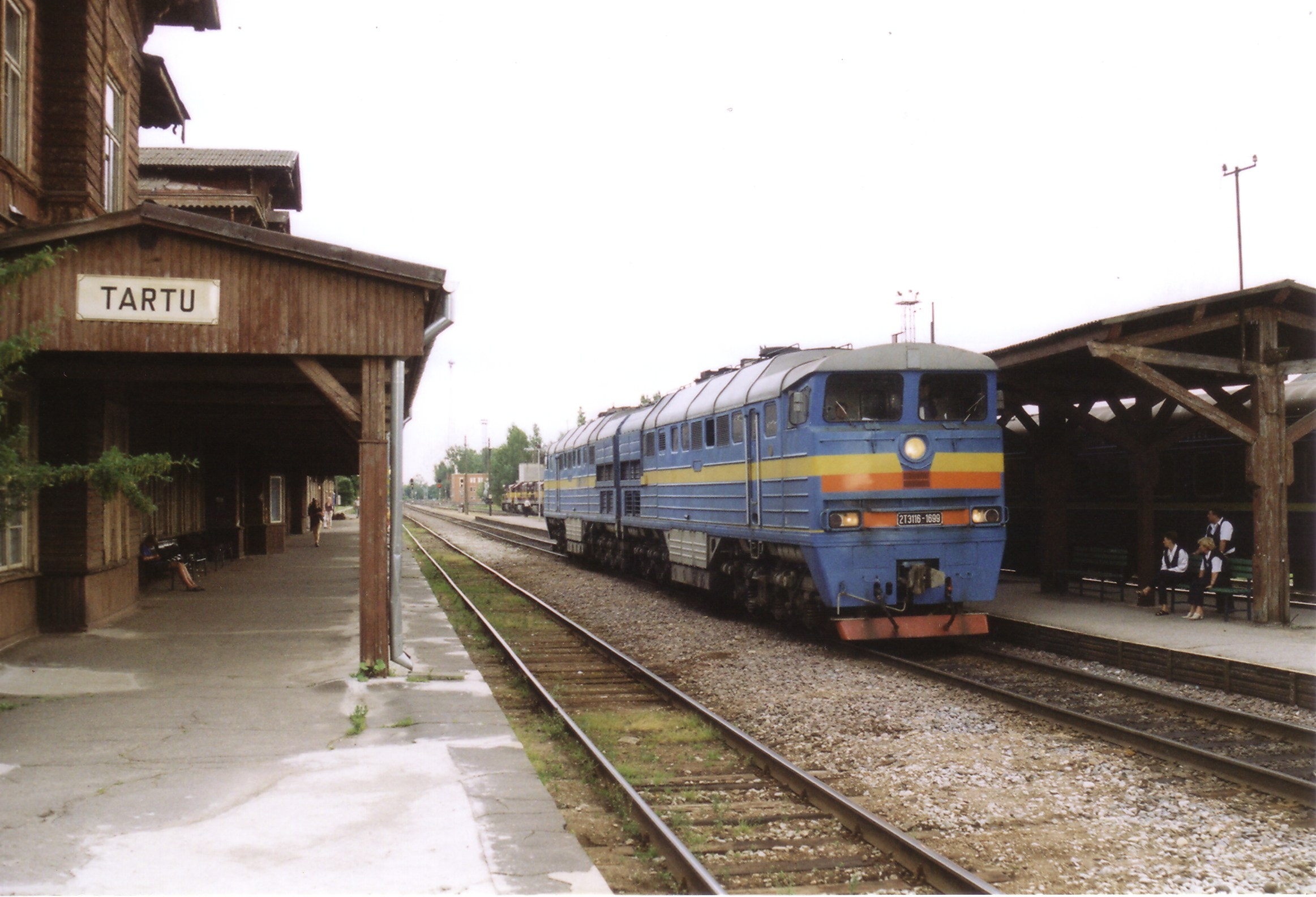
Station in 2005

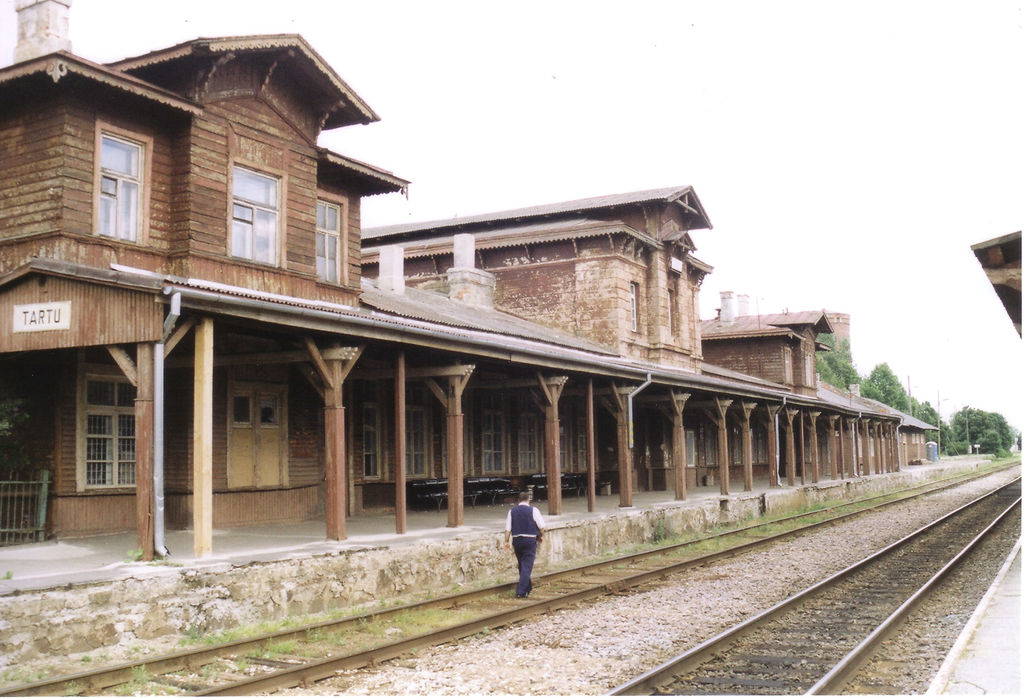

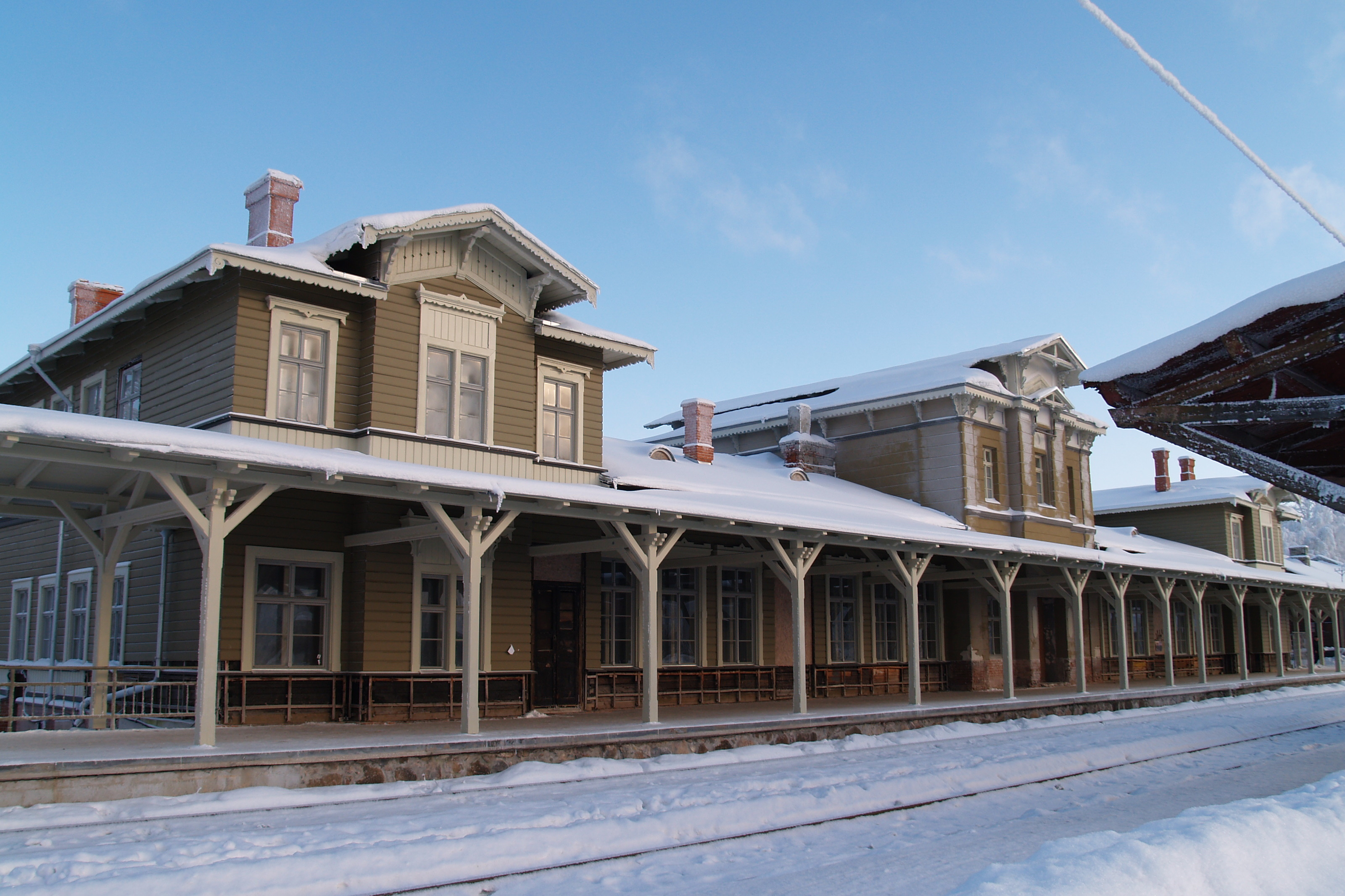
The platforms of Tartu railway station during winter.

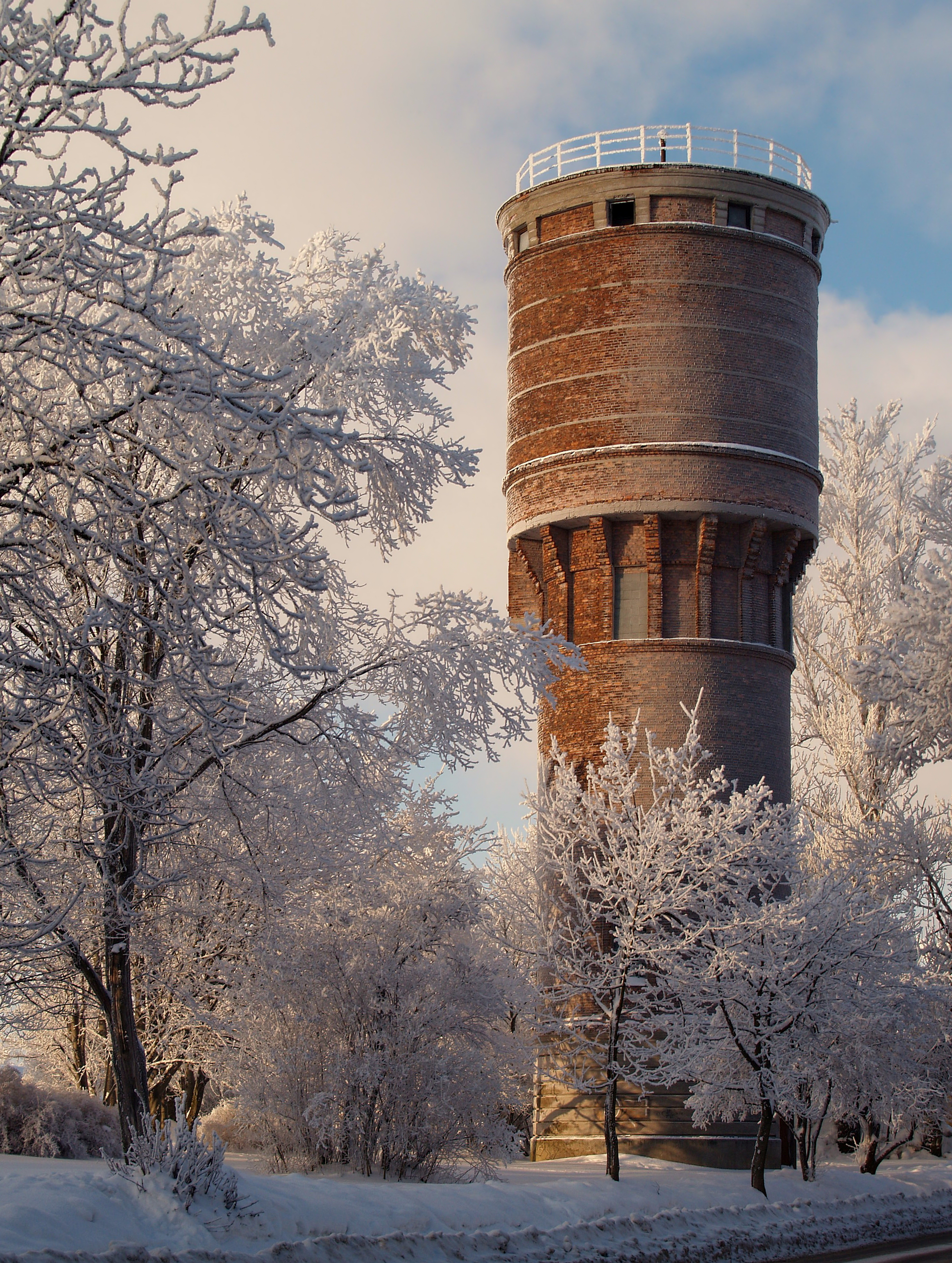
A water tower in the station from 1950s

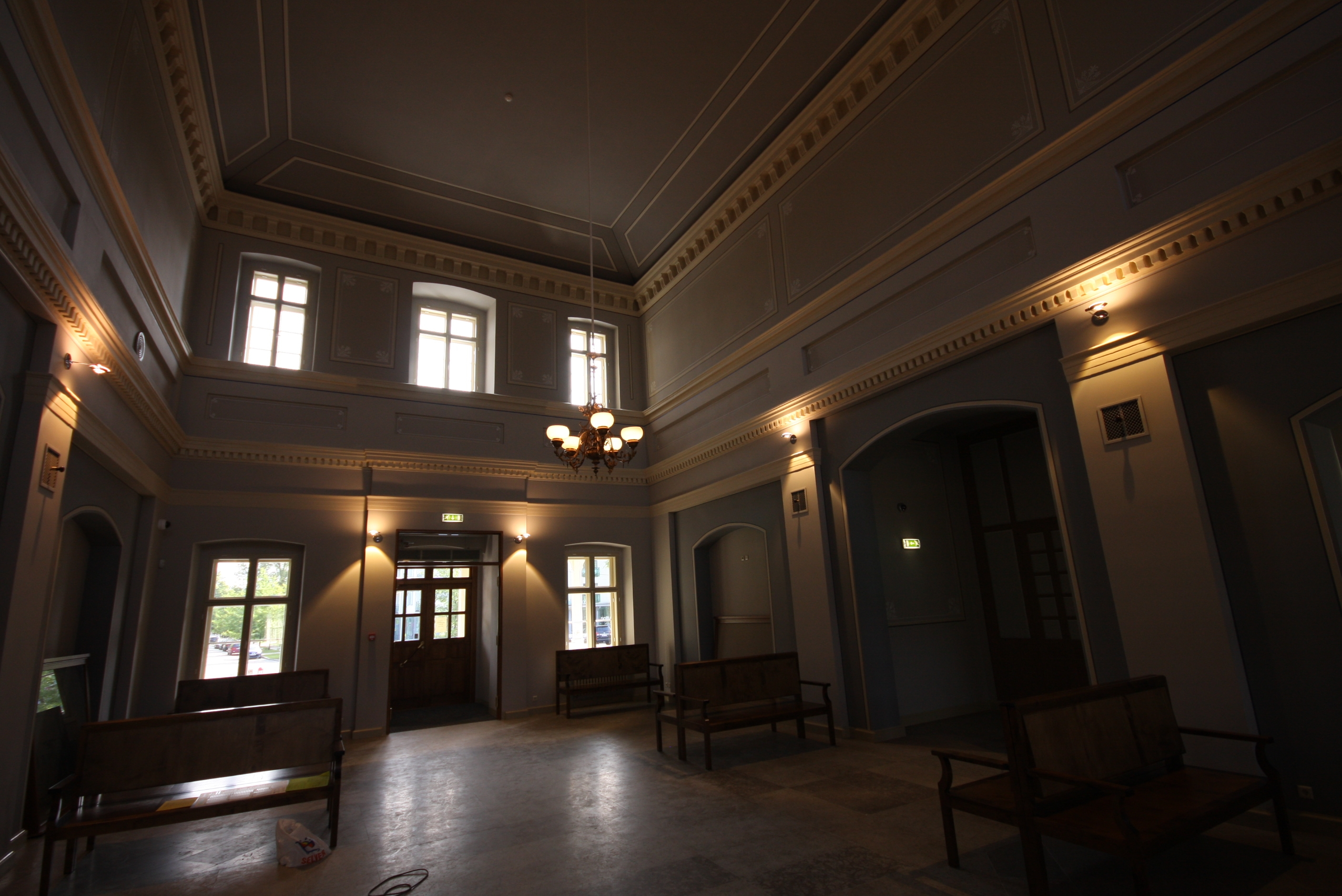
Passengers' lounge in the station building after renovation in 2012

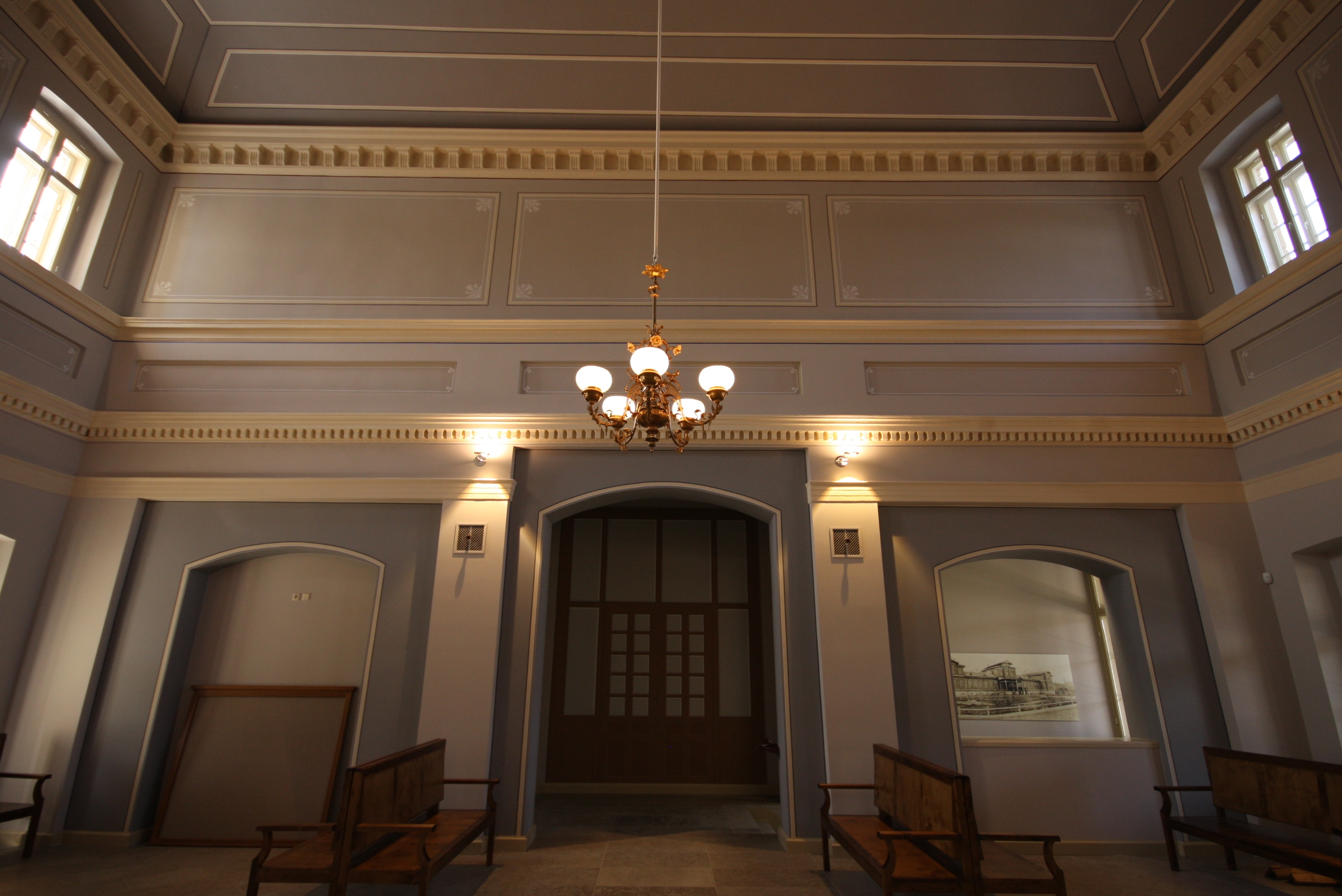

== See also ==
- List of railway stations in Estonia
- Rail transport in Estonia
