= Škoda 21Ev =

Electric multiple unit passenger train

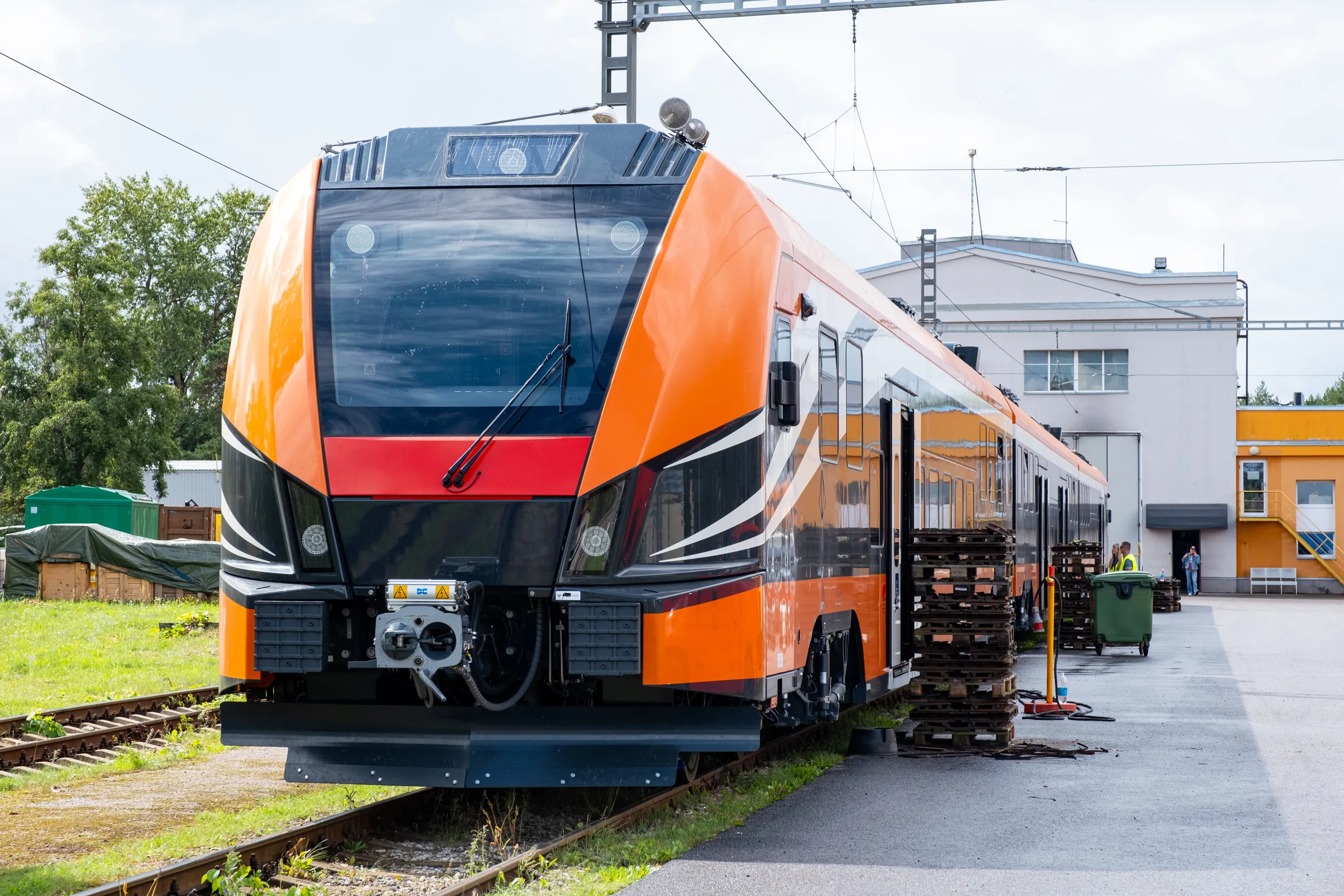
- Škoda 21Ev EMU near a depot
- Stock type: Electric multiple unit
- In service: 2025–
- Manufacturer: Škoda Vagonka A.S
- Assembly: Ostrava, Czech Republic
- Constructed: 2020–2026
- Entered service: 2025
- Number built: 16
- Capacity: 236 (262 on commuter trains)
- Operator: AS Eesti Liinirongid
- Depot: Pääsküla depot
- Lines served: Tallinn-Tapa railway line Tallinn-Kloogaranna route Tallinn-Pääsküla route

Specifications
- Train length: 83,180 millimetres (272.90 ft)
- Width: 3,430 millimetres (11.25 ft)
- Height: 4,560 millimetres (14.96 ft)
- Doors: 2 per end car, 4 on middle car
- Maximum speed: 160 kilometres per hour (99 mph)
- Weight: 157.7 tonnes (348,000 lb)
- Engine type: Electric
- Tractive effort: 2,200kW
- Electric systems: 3kV DC & 25kV AC OHLE
- Current collection: Pantograph
- Safety system: ETCS
- Coupling system: Scharfenberg coupler
- Track gauge: 1,520 mm (4 ft 11 27/32 in)

The Škoda 21Ev is a dual-system electric multiple unit (EMU) passenger train made by Škoda Vagonka A.S for the Estonian national rail operator Elron, which can drive on electrified tracks equipped with both 3kV DC and 25kV AC overhead electric lines. The Škoda 21Ev is part of Škoda's RegioPanter family of trains.

Estonia's neighboring Baltic state Latvia also operates a train of the same class, called Škoda 16Ev operated by Vivi, a Latvian rail operator. Functionally, it is the same as Estonia's Škoda 21Ev with minor differences like seating arrangement and appearance.

The trains were produced by a Czech company Škoda Vagonka A.S who had won Elron's procurement contract in 2020. In total, 16 trains were produced for the rail operator, of which 11 are long-distance trains and 5 are commuter trains. The first trains arrived in June of 2024, after which also began their test driving to ensure they are fit for passenger service.

The trains feature air-conditioning, pram and disabled areas (wheelchair), a food and hot drinks area (exclusively on the long-distance trains), a wheelchair-accessible toilet, free Wi-Fi meant for use in second class & business class Wi-Fi meant for travelers in the business class area.

== Usage in Estonia ==
The first trains put into service were the commuter trains which, at first, served only the Tallinn-Kloogaranna line in late 2025. In January 2026, the Tallinn-Tapa line was also opened for the new Škoda trains. The entire Tallinn-Tartu line will be opened for the new trains when Eesti Raudtee (Estonian Railway) finishes electrifying and upgrading rail infrastructure.

Originally, this project should've finished in December of 2024, however it has been delayed and is expected to finish earliest in the summer of 2028, according to Eesti Raudtee (Estonian Railway) - the national company responsible for managing rail infrastructure in Estonia - and Eesti Rahvusringhääling (ERR) the Public Broadcaster of Estonia.

This electric multiple unit uses overhead lines to power its electric motors which have a combined power of 2,200kW. At the moment, the EMU is limited to 120 kilometres per hour (75 mph) on Estonian railways since the rail network is not ready for higher speeds. The government has been interested in raising speeds to 160 kilometres per hour (99 mph) since 2012.

== Technical specifications ==
- Seats: 236 (long-distance trains), 262 (commuter trains)
- Gross weight: 157,7 tons
- Length: 83,2 meters
- Width: 3,43 meters
- Cars per train: 3
- Height: 4,56 meters
- Compatible voltages: 25kV AC & 3kV DC
- Maximum speed: 160km/h (99mph)
- Combined power: 2,200kW
- Safety systems: ETCS

== Miscellaneous specifications ==
- Axle arrangement: 2'Bo + 2'2'+B'o2
- Places for wheelchairs: 2
- Bicycle holders: 15

Additionally, it is noted in official documents that the trains' bicycle holders can be replaced with regular seats during the winter.
