= Edelaraudtee =

Estonian railway company

Coordinates: 58.808302°N 25.407375°E

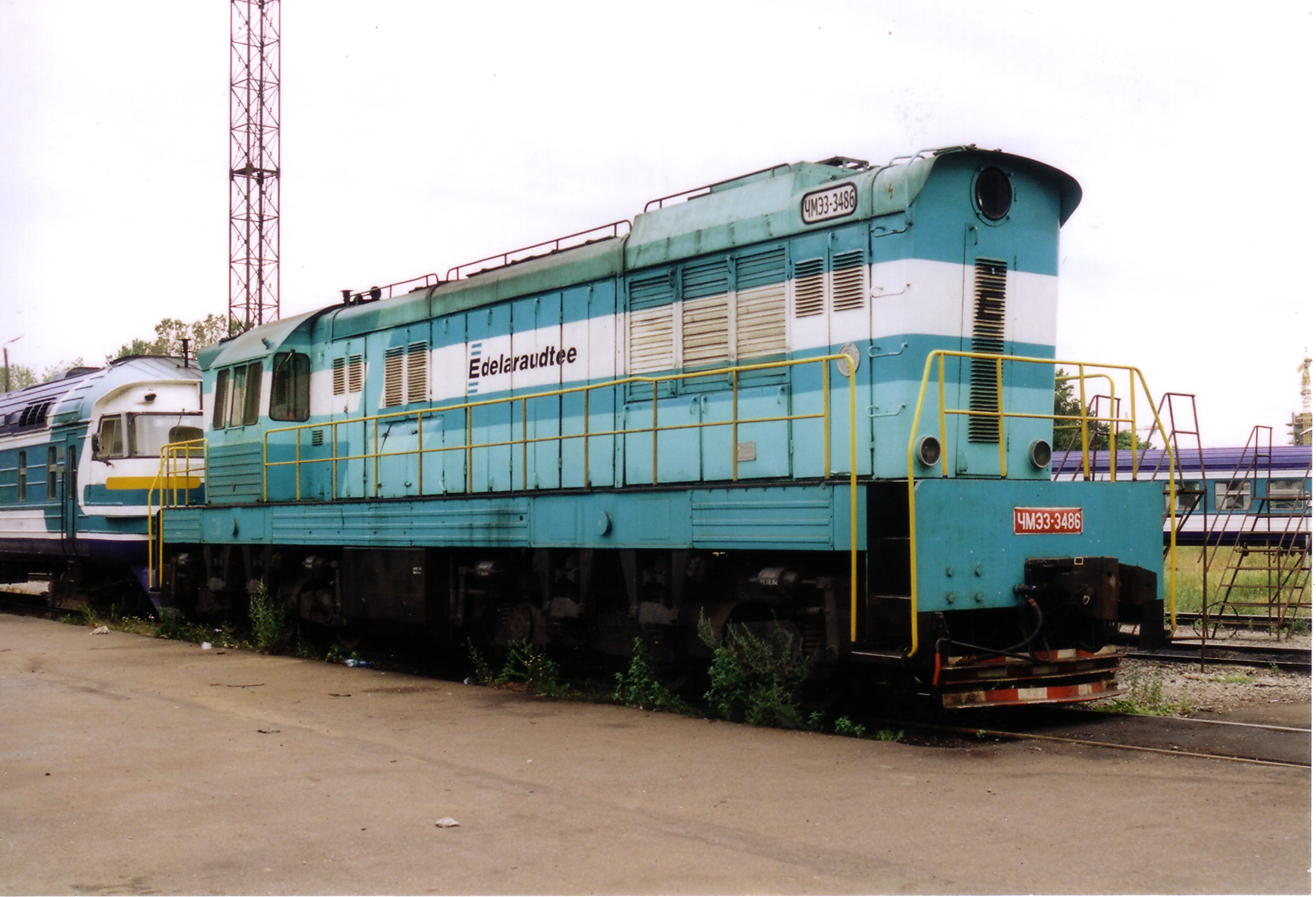

Overview
- Locale: Estonia
- Annual ridership: 1,820,000 (2011)
- Website: www.edel.ee

Operation
- Began operation: 1997
- Ended operation: 2014
- Operator: Edelaraudtee AS

Technical
- Track gauge: 1,520 mm (4 ft 11 27/32 in)

Edelaraudtee (Southwestern railway) is a private Estonian railway infrastructure owner and freight operator that operates the railway lines from Tallinn to Viljandi and from Lelle to Pärnu.

Founded in 1997, Edelaraudtee operates freight services on lines from Tallinn to Rapla, Pärnu & Viljandi owned by Edelaraudtee Infrastruktuuri AS and part of AS Go Group. Prior to 2014, the company also operated the domestic inter-city passenger routes that are currently operated by Elron. Before the transfer of the passenger traffic to Elron, Edelaraudtee employed around 500 staff and carried approximately 1.8 million passengers per year.

== History ==
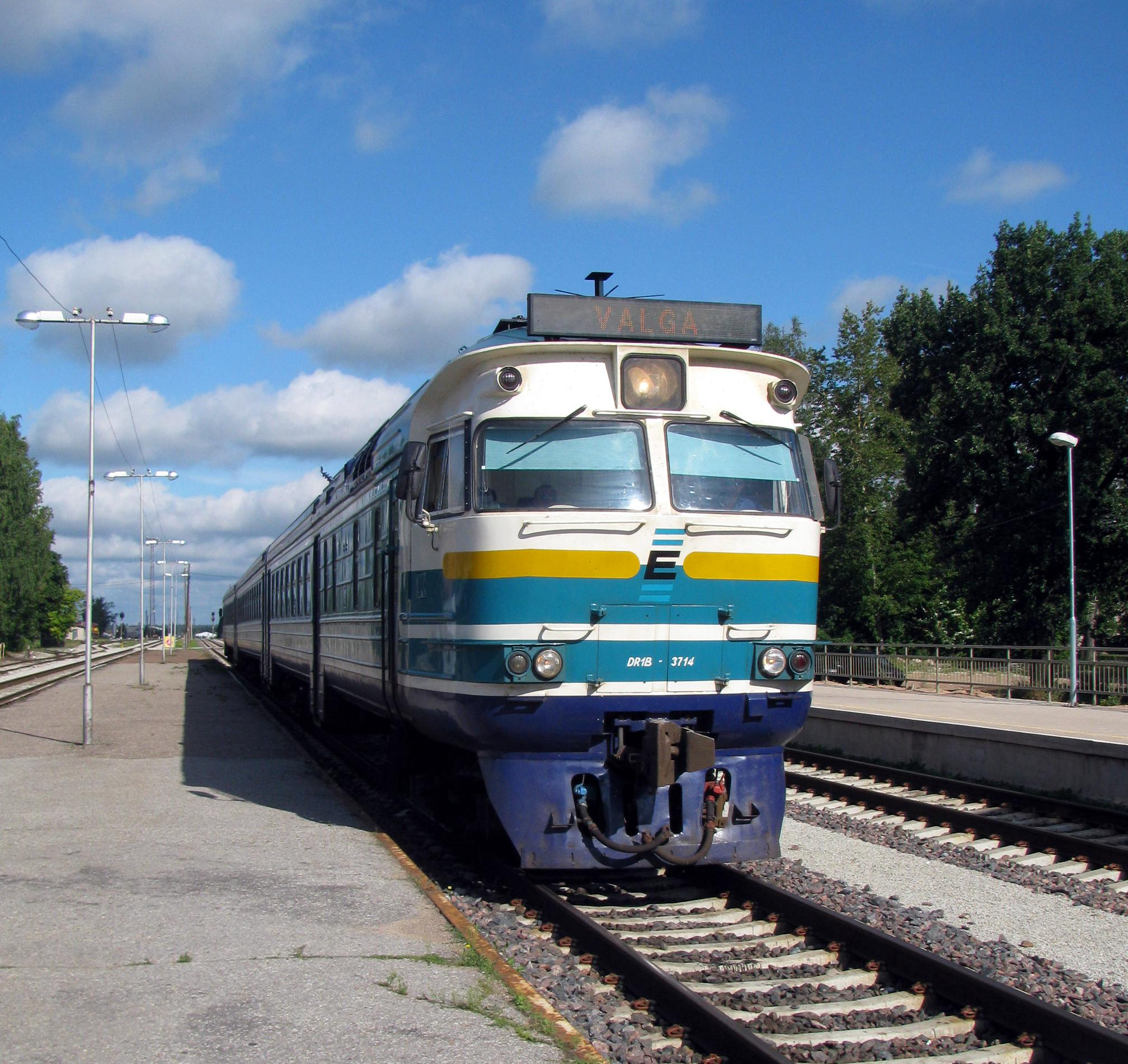
Former passenger diesel multiple unit DR1B at Tartu (2010)

In November 2000, the British private railway company GB Railways acquired an interest in Edelaraudtee through the Estonian subsidiary GB Railways Eesti AS in exchange for 10 million Kroon ($540,000) along with investment and stock increase deals over a five year period as part of the agreement. Accordingly, GB Railways owned 20% of the shares, with the majority owners being Edelaraudtee chairman Henn Ruubel and lawyer Marcel Vichmannile. In 2002, GB Railways' investment in the company was only valued at £70,000; the British business provided management to the company on a fee basis. Around this time, the State Audit Office publicly criticised the subsidy system in use upon Estonia's railways and called for reforms.

During 2008, Edelaraudtee announced that it would withdraw entirely from conducting freight operations on its own infrastructure and would instead focus on passenger transport. It was speculated that Estonian Railways would launch freight operations on Pärnu and Viljandi lines as a consequence. At the time of the announcement, Edelaraudtee was one of three passenger operators running services on the infrastructure of Estonian Railways. By January 2012, Edelaraudtee was Estonia’s largest passenger railway operator; that month, the company's trains transported 145,000 passengers, the greater number of travellers recorded in the five years prior. This improvement partially explained by the recent completion of renovation work on the Tallinn-Viljandi line.

During early 2009, a new e-ticket booking system was introduced by Edelaraudtee, allowing passengers to purchase tickets from anywhere in the world. On 16 March 2012, the company launched a new information display solution based on GPS, that provided passengers real-time information on the trains’ locations via the internet and physical displays. The developed information project, whose part is that solution, had an objective to provide passengers necessary opportunities to acquire trip information. Edelaraudtee had plans to equip all serviced train stations and stops with QR codes to link passengers with relevant station’s or train stop’s information display on the Internet.

On 1 January 2010, Edelaraudtee relaunched services on the Tartu to Valga line after the line had previously been closed in April 2008 for extensive repair work. Edelaraudtee operated two services per day between the two locations. During 2012, following completion of upgrade work on the line between Türi and Viljandi, 120kmph running was permitted, reducing the journey time to Viljandi by 20 minutes, for a total travel time of 2 hours and 22 minutes.

=== End of passenger services ===
In May 2013, the Estonian government declared that Eesti Liinirongid, later rebranded as Elron, would be the sole domestic passenger operator in Estonia, compelling Edelaraudtee to reorientate its operations away from this sector. A legal dispute between Edelaraudtee and the Estonian government broke out over compensation for lost revenue from the operator's forced withdrawal from passenger services. The final day of Edeleraudtee's service was December 31, 2013, however the final Tallinn-Türi train called at Kolu station and Türi station after midnight, on January 1, 2014. All of Edelaraudtee's station stops open on its final day of operation were taken over, except for Kolu stop.

During 2017, Edelaraudtee publicly stated its regret in response to the Estonian government's decision to discontinue train traffic on the Lelle-Pärnu section of the railway network to avoid the need to expend approximately €17 million. Throughout the 2010s, Edelaraudtee examined various opportunities to increase the operating speeds of certain lines, often in collaboration with Elron.

In 2021, Edelaraudtee opened a new control center in Türi; built at a cost of €3 million, this center will be fed all infrastructure data and remove the need for station managers to be present. Information is displayed digitally, and has been structured in a manner which permits control operations to be entirely automated.

Under the Rail Baltica programme, a new high-speed railway trunk line will be built between the three Baltic states; it is planned to intersect with Edelaraudtee's existing infrastructure along the Loone-Hagudi section.

== Rolling stock ==
Freight operations are handled by Czech-built ChME3 diesel shunters, while passenger services were provided by around twenty DR1A/B diesel multiple units.

Delivery of 18 electric and 20 diesel Stadler FLIRT trains built by Stadler Rail started in 2012, and by June 2014 all trains had arrived in Estonia. Since 2014, all services are operated by Elron using the new trains.

== See also ==
- Tallinn-Tapa railway
