= Elron (rail transit) =

Estonian passenger railway

Coordinates: 59.364829°N 24.633316°E

AS Eesti Liinirongid

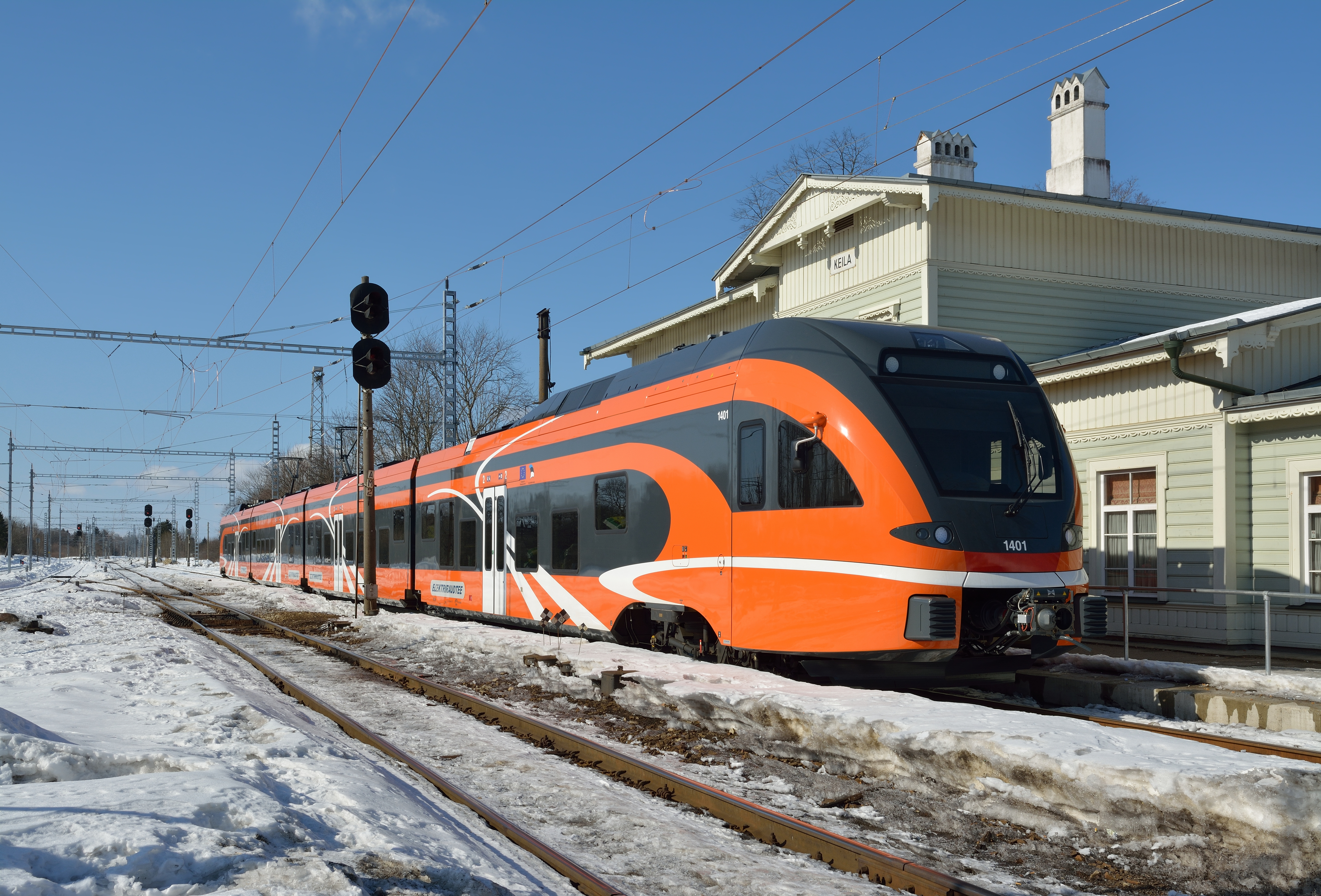
- Elron Stadler FLIRT EMU at Keila station
- Trade name: Elron
- Type: Government-owned corporation
- Industry: Rail transport
- Founded: 1998 (as Elektriraudtee); October 2013 (as Elron)
- Headquarters: Tallinn, Estonia
- Products: Rail transport
- Website: www.elron.ee

AS Eesti Liinirongid, operating as Elron, is a government-owned passenger train operator in Estonia.

Prior to 2014, the company operated exclusively the electrified commuter rail system in Harjumaa, and was known until October 2013 as Elektriraudtee, i.e. "the Electrical Railway". On 1 January 2014, Elron took over all domestic passenger train services in Estonia from Edelaraudtee.

== History ==
The company was founded as Elektriraudtee in 1998. While initially operating as a subsidiary of Eesti Raudtee, it was separated entirely within two years.

In May 2013, the Estonian government declared that Elron would be the sole domestic passenger operator in Estonia, compelling the Estonian operator Edelaraudtee to reorientate its operations away from the passenger sector. This change was not unchallenged; a legal dispute between Edelaraudtee and the Estonian government broke out over compensation for lost revenue from the operator's forced withdrawal from passenger services.

Railways map Zone 1 (Tallinn) - Green, Zone 2 - Purple, Zone 3 - Cyan, Zone 4 - Yellow, Zone 5 - Dark red, Tartu zone - Red, Stop-based fare - Gray, Short waiting platform - ⓒ

Throughout the late 2010s and early 2020s, Elron collaborated closely with Edelaraudtee to examine and implement various opportunities to increase the operating speeds of certain lines, thus enabling Elron's services to run faster in some places. In May 2020, Eesti Raudtee announced a tender to design and provide to electrify the entire Estonian rail network. That same year, Elron openly spoke on its enthusiasm to electrify the cross-border line between Tallinn and St. Petersburg via a prospective future joint project between Russia and Estonia if favourable terms could be agreed.

During the 2020s, Elron has multiple plans to expand and improve its network. Options have been studied, including the requisitioning of former goods lines, while a proposed reorganization could reduce the travel times between Tallinn and Tartu to beneath two hours. The maximum service speed of Elron's trains is reportedly set to increase to 160 kilometers per hour. By 2023, work was underway to reconnect the western Estonian town of Haapsalu, which has not been reachable from the capital by rail since the 1990s, by 2027. A new terminal in Kristiine, west of Tallinn's city center, is also being planned, that shall be better interconnected with the rest of the city's public transport.

In mid-2021, a new higher fare for passengers travelling with bicycles was introduced. During January 2022, after two years without any price rises, Elron increased its regular fares by almost 9.5 percent, attributing this as a response to rising energy prices as well to finance infrastructure changes. Two months later, the company announced that Ukrainian refugees would be able to travel on its trains for free. In May 2022, it was announced that passenger numbers, which had sharply dipped in 2020 amid the COVID-19 pandemic, had recovered.

During late 2023, Elron ceased its Russian language announcements following complaints. In September 2023, Elron's ticketing system was temporarily disrupted by a distributed denial-of-service (DDoS) attacks thought to have been the work of pro-Russia hackers.

== Network ==
=== Inter-city rail ===
Elron operates inter-city trains from Tallinn's Baltic Station on several lines: Tallinn–Tartu–Valga (connecting to Pasažieru vilciens trains to Riga), Tallinn–Tartu–Koidula, Tallinn–Narva and Tallinn–Viljandi.

Services on the Tallinn–Pärnu route ended in December 2018. The line required substantial upgrading and it was not felt worthwhile spending the money required for this around 8 years before Rail Baltica is due to provide much faster service to Pärnu.

=== Tallinn commuter rail ===
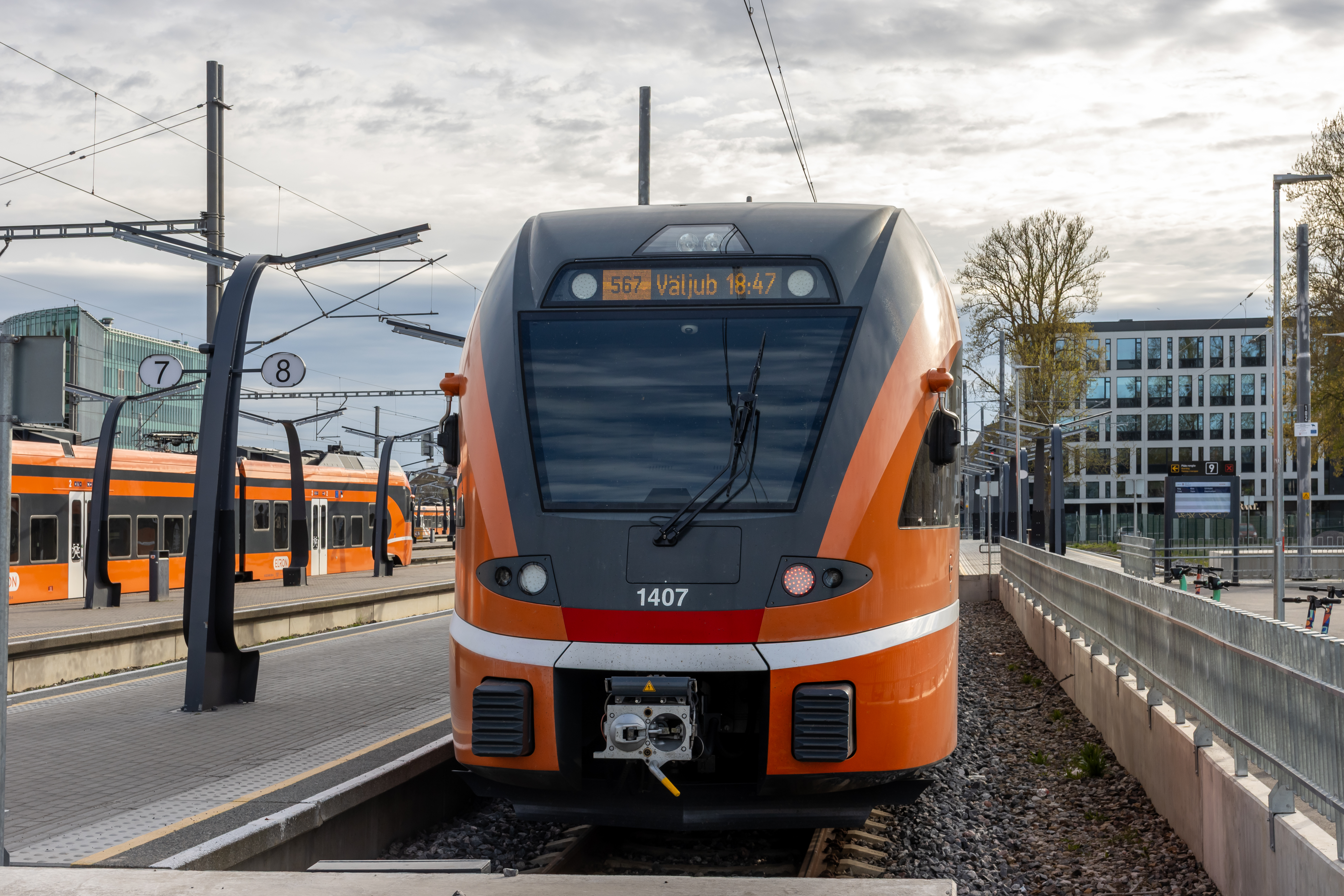
A commuter train to Paldiski at the Baltic Station in Tallinn

Tallinn's commuter rail network is electrified, and it extends east and west from Baltic Station, the total length of the network being 132 km (82 mi). The eastbound line goes to Aegviidu. The westbound line goes to the town of Keila, where it divides into two branches continuing towards the cargo-harbour city of Paldiski and inland to Turba. The Paldiski branch splits at Klooga, with a short spur going to the beach at Klooga-rand.

Work to upgrade track and the stations took place in the early 2010s. To provide better mobile data coverage when passing through rural areas, 25 new cell towers were installed by Telia alongside the Tallinn-Tartu line while 5G apparatus were installed onboard Elron's trains during the early 2020s.

== Rolling stock ==
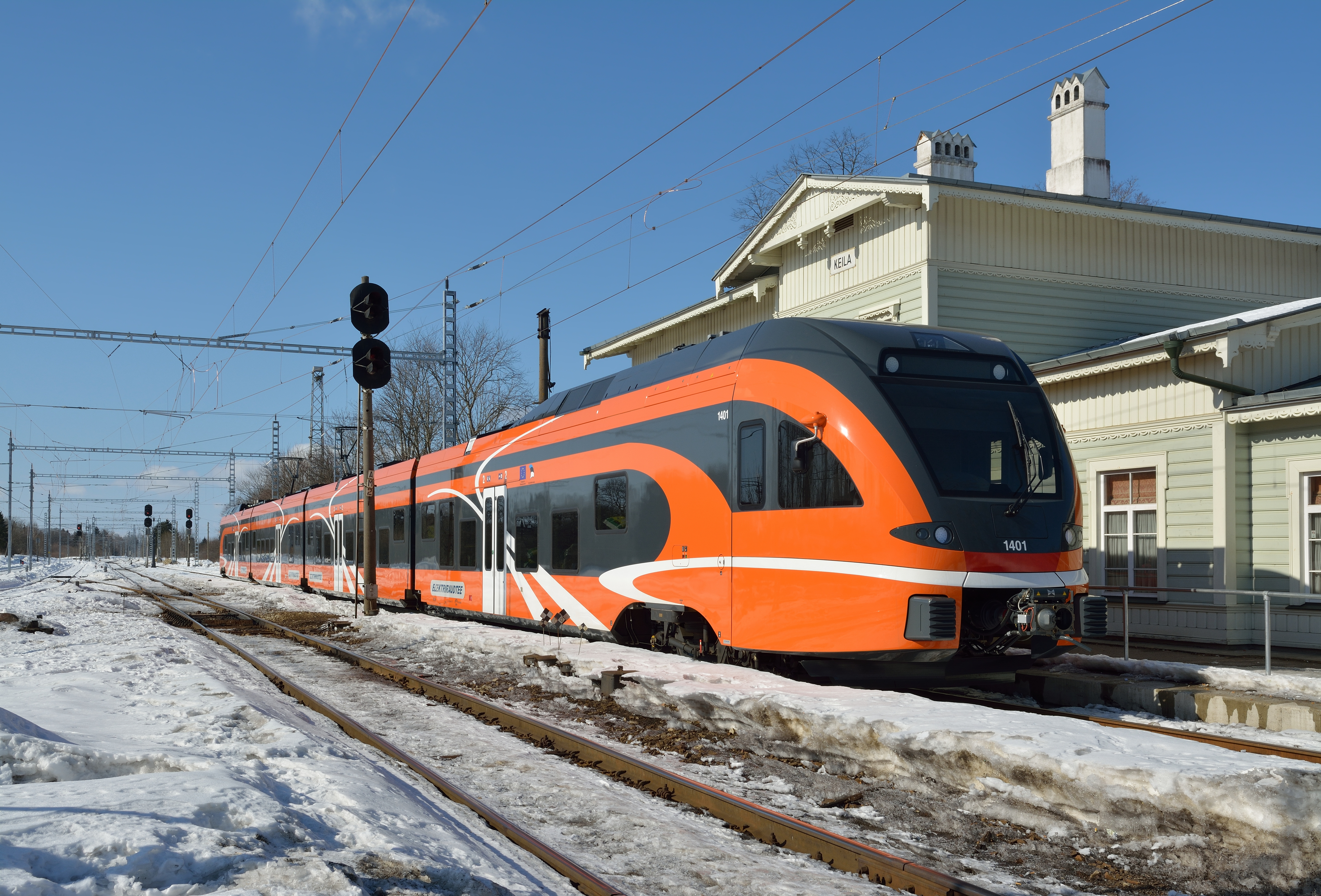
Stadler FLIRT EMU in Keila

Elron currently operates a total of 54 trains, with 38 of them being Stadler FLIRT EMUs and DEMUs, and 16 of them being Škoda 21Ev EMUs.

Delivery of the 12 three-car and 6 four-car EMU and 6 two-car, 8 three-car and 6 four-car DEMU trains built by Stadler Rail started in 2012; by June 2014 all trains had arrived in Estonia. As of 2015, all of the old ER2 and DR1 units have been retired.

In mid-2019, Elron received permission to purchase 4 new hybrid trains with an option to add 2 electric trains. The decision was due to frequently overcrowding on the operator's most popular routes, given an increase of passenger number of more than a third since the replacement of the rolling stock with the Stadler fleet in 2014.

During October 2020, Elron announced that Škoda Transportation had won the procurement for six new electric trains with an option to buy 10 more. In January 2023 this option was taken up. Škoda produced 11 long-distance and 5 suburban dual system electric trains (Škoda 21Ev InterPanter), which have a number of replaceable seats allowing space for bicycles in warm months, while providing more seating in colder months. The cost of the initial six trains was €56.2 million, rising to €146.8 million with the 10 additional sets. The first of these new sets were delivered to Estonia in April 2025, and entered service on Tallinn's suburban lines on 15 December 2025. The long-distance sets were initially due to begin operating on the electrified Tallinn-Tartu route, however due to the lack of electrification past Tapa, they will initially also serve these short-distance routes.

Elron rolling stock
Stock	Type	Introduced	Cars	Seats			Quantity
Stock	Type	Introduced	Cars	Configuration	I class	II class	Quantity
Stadler FLIRT	EMU	2013	3	Commuter service	0	188	12
Stadler FLIRT	EMU	2013	4	Commuter service	0	262	6
Stadler FLIRT	DEMU	2014	2	Inter-city service	16	89	6
Stadler FLIRT	DEMU	2014	3	Inter-city service	24	137	8
Stadler FLIRT	DEMU	2014	4	Inter-city service	48	166	6
Škoda 21Ev	EMU	2026	3	Inter-city service	32	204	11
Škoda 21Ev	EMU	2025	3	Commuter service	0	263	5
Total							54

== Rail Baltica ==
On 18 March 2026, Elron, in cooperation with the Latvian passenger train operator ViVi and the Lithuanian passenger train operator LTG Link, announced a framework procurement for Rail Baltica regional passenger trains. Rail Baltica will procure European standard gauge trains with a speed of up to 200 km/h. The trains will have at least 200 seats, standard and business class; a quiet area; a family area; an area for animals. In addition, catering with a coffee machine, 2 toilets; high-speed internet (5G); 4 wheelchair spaces and 20 bicycle racks. Estonia will initially purchase 5 trains with the option to purchase 2 additional trains, Latvia plans to purchase 5 train sets and Lithuania 8. Train length up to 106 meters.

The train journey from Tallinn to Pärnu is planned to take 57 minutes as an express line and from Tallinn to Häädemeeste in about 1 hour 20 minutes.

The first trains are planned to arrive in Estonia in the second quarter of 2029.

== See also ==
- Rail transport in Estonia
- GoRail
- Helsinki commuter rail
- Pasažieru vilciens
- Public transport in Tallinn
- Rail Baltica
