= Track gauge in Estonia =

Estonia mainly uses a track gauge of 1,520 mm (4 ft 11 27/32 in) or 1,524 mm (5 ft), inherited from the Russian Empire and/or Soviet occupation times. Historically, the standard (1435 mm) gauge was in use throughout Estonia during the German occupation during World War II from 1941 to 1944, after which the tracks were reverted to the 1520 mm standard in use today. Attempts are underway to build a standard gauge railway as well.

== Russian and 5 ft gauges ==
Soviet Union

Estonia converted relatively late from the Soviet Union's redefinition of the gauge from 1,524 mm (5 ft) to 1,520 mm (4 ft 11 27/32 in).

Post-independence

Since post-independence all renovated tracks owned by Eesti Raudtee have gauge 1,524 mm. Other tracks have gauge 1,520 mm.

== Standard gauge proposals ==
The Rail Baltica rail network, currently under construction since the early 2020s, would link Tallinn and Warsaw by using a high-speed standard gauge track.

== Narrow gauge ==
Historically Estonia had 750 mm (2 ft 5 1/2 in) narrow-gauge installations. The tram network in Tallinn has a track gauge of 1,067 mm (3 ft 6 in).
