= Narrow-gauge railways in Estonia =

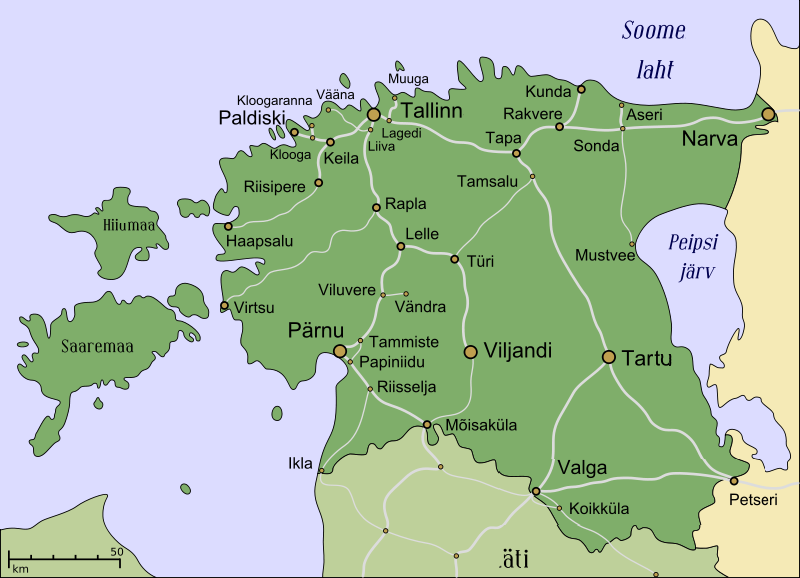
Narrow-gauge railway lines in Estonia. Narrow lines on the map represent the narrow gauge. Some lines (Tallinn–Pärnu–Mõisaküla and Lelle–Viljandi) were later replaced by the wide gauge.

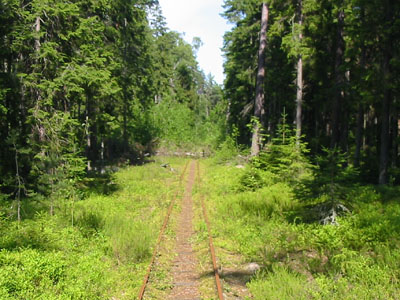
A surviving narrow-gauge railway on Naissaar island

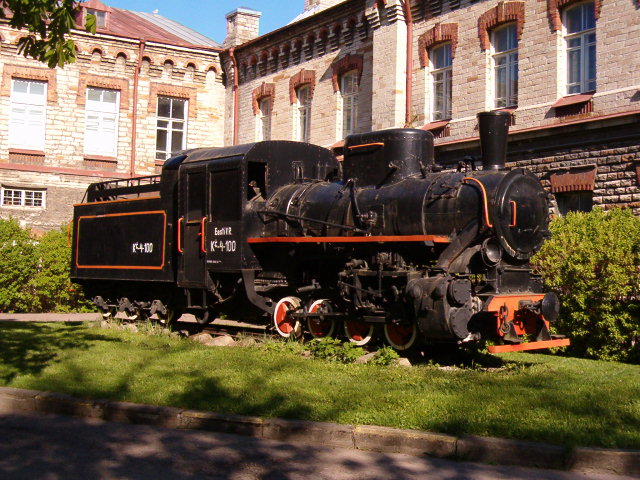
Narrow-gauge steam engine Kc4-100 in Tallinn

All Estonian narrow-gauge railways were built at the gauge of 750 mm (2 ft 5 1/2 in). Four museum lines and some industrial peat railways survive.

== Railways ==
- Kunda cement factory, the first narrow-gauge railway in Estonia, built 1886.
- Pärnu–Mõisaküla–Valga line, 121 km (75 mi), opened 1896.
- Tallinn–Lelle–Türi–Viljandi–Mõisaküla line. 196 km (122 mi), opened in several stages between 1897 and 1900. Short branch line from Türi to Paide, 14 km (8.7 mi), opened 1901.
- Valga–Mõniste–Ape–Alūksne–Gulbene line, opened in 1903.
- Liiva–Vääna, 23 km (14 mi), part of Peter the Great's Naval Fortress' railway network around Tallinn. The line to Vääna was built in several stages in 1913.
- Paide–Tamsalu, 47 km (29 mi), built during World War I as a military railway, opened to public passenger and freight traffic in 1918.
- Riisselja–Orajõe, 44 km (27 mi), opened 1923. In 1928 extended to Ikla, on the border to Latvia (5 km; 3.1 mi). In 1942 1 km-long (0.62 mi) extension across the border to Ainazi, terminus of the 750 mm (2 ft 5 1/2 in) gauge Valmiera supply railway.
- Lelle–Papiniidu (Pärnu), 71 km (44 mi), opened 1928. 27 km-long (17 mi) branch from Viluvere to Vändra.
- Rapla–Virtsu, 96 km (60 mi), opened 1931.
- Sonda–Mustvee line in northeastern Estonia, 63 km (39 mi) with several branches.
- Järvakandi glassworks, 15 km (9.3 mi), industrial

== Museums ==
- The Lavassaare railway museum houses a large collection of steam, diesel and electric locomotives with a 2 km-long (1.2 mi) 750 mm (2 ft 5 1/2 in) gauge railway.
- There is a museum with a 750 mm (2 ft 5 1/2 in) gauge, 500 m-long (1,600 ft) line in Avinurme which houses one locomotive and a collection of wagons.
- An underground museum with a short electric line is located in Kiviõli in the Northeast-Estonian industrial area.
- A former military railway line with a 750 mm (2 ft 5 1/2 in) gauge is located on Naissaar island in the northern Estonia.
