= Tallinn–Tapa railway =

Railway in Estonia

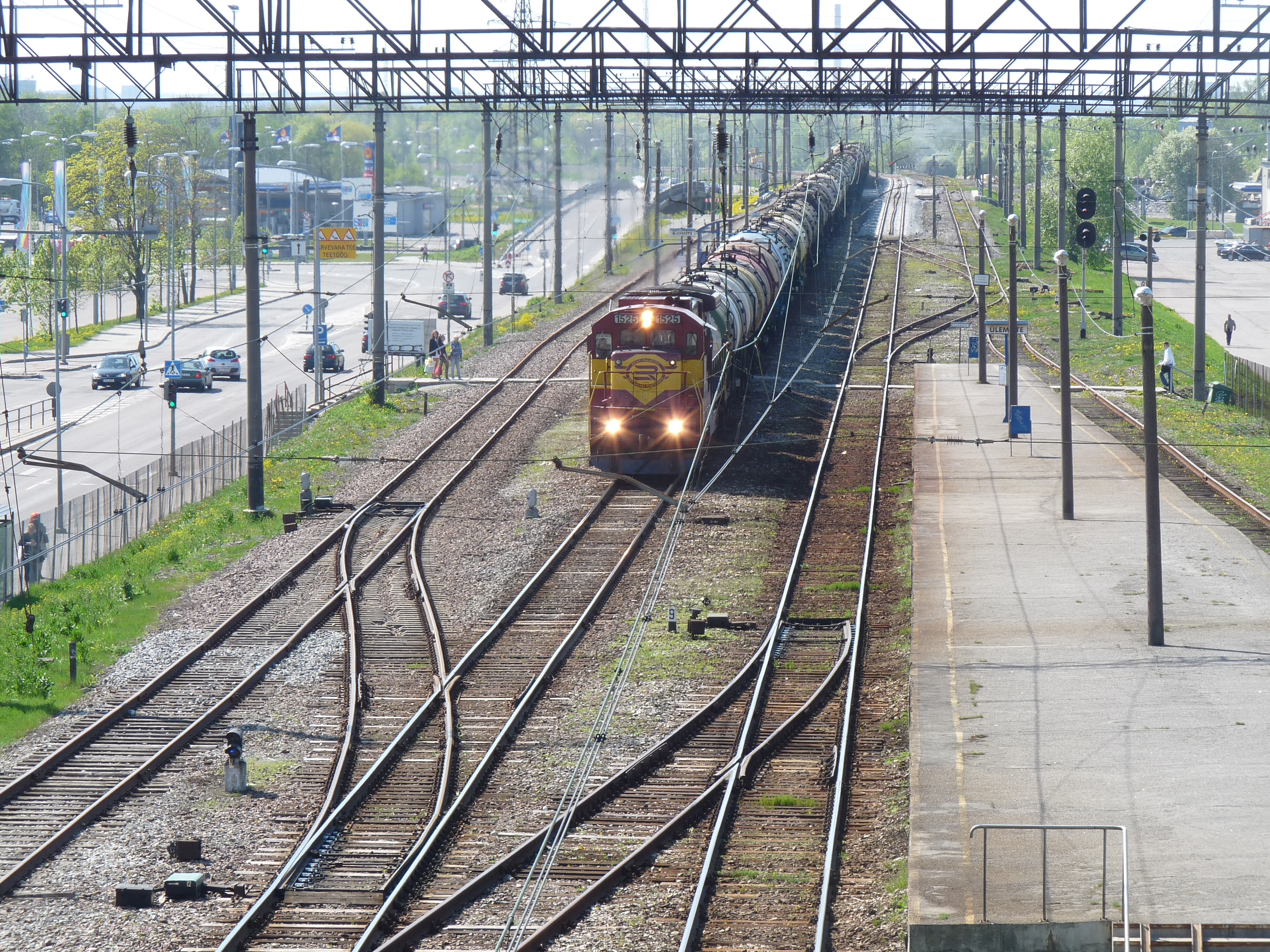
- Tallinn–Tapa railway at Ülemiste station

Overview
- Status: Operational
- Owner: Eesti Raudtee
- Locale: Estonia (Harju County, Lääne-Viru County)
- Termini: Tallinn Baltic Station; Tapa railway station
- Stations: 17

Service
- Type: Regional rail Commuter rail Freight rail
- Route number: RE33 RE34 R30 R32 RE33 E33 E34 E35
- Operator(s): Elron; EVR Cargo
- Depot(s): Tallinn Baltic Station; Tapa railway station
- Rolling stock: 2TE116; DR1A (withdrawn); DR1B (withdrawn); Stadler FLIRT (from 2012); Škoda 21Ev; ER2 (withdrawn); GE C36-7i; GE C30-7Ai; ChME3; M62 (withdrawn)

History
- Opened: 1870

Technical
- Track length: 77.8 km (48.3 mi)
- Number of tracks: Double track
- Track gauge: 1,520 mm (4 ft 11 27/32 in) Russian gauge
- Electrification: 3 kV DC OHLE (Tallinn to Aegviidu); 25 kV AC OHLE
- Operating speed: 120 km/h (75 mph) (operational); 135 km/h (84 mph) (planned); 160 km/h (99 mph) (long-term planned)

The Tallinn–Tapa railway is a 77.8-kilometre (48.3 mi) long double track electrified railway line in Estonia, connecting the cities of Tallinn and Tapa.

== Operational use ==
The line starts at Tallinn Baltic Station, runs through Northern Estonia in eastern direction and ends in Tapa, where it connects with railways to Narva and Tartu. It has 17 stations, including its two termini. The line is equipped for speeds up to 120 km/h on its entire length. Ülemiste train station and Tallinn Baltic Station are included into planned Rail Baltica high-speed standard gauge railway. Passenger trains are being operated by Elron. Lux Express announced its plans to operate the line between Tallinn and St. Petersburg with two Stadler trains. The line has a railway connection, which serves Muuga Harbour, the largest cargo port in Estonia. Large marshalling yards are at Tallinn Baltic Station, Ülemiste railway station and Tapa railway station.

== History ==
Tallinn-Tapa train services will start operating on January 5, 2026, with new Škoda rolling stock, with the maximum speed being 160 km/h. The railway forms together with the Tapa–Narva railway the Tallinn–Narva railway. Its length is 209.6 km (130.2 mi). This line was completed in 1870 and was originally a part of the railway line, which connected St. Peterburg and Paldiski through Tallinn and Narva as a part of the railway network of the Russian Empire.

== Infrastructure ==
The railway is maintained from Tallinn Baltic Station and Tapa railway station. The railway infrastructure operator is EVR Infra – a subsidiary of the national railway company Eesti Raudtee. Modernisation of interlocking of the stations will be made in 2014 and implementation of the ETCS second level is dependant from the phase of development of the technology and comes as the third stage of ERMTS implementation plan for Estonian conventional rail network in period 2019–2025.

=== Track ===
The track is 1,520 mm (4 ft 11 27/32 in) Broad gauge. The line is fully electrified using overhead lines with 3 kV DC and 25 kV AC railway electrification.

=== Stations ===
All stations are being rebuilt according to European Council decision 2002/735/EC and Estonian standard EVS 867:2003 from a platform height of 1,100 mm to the EU standard platform height of 550 mm.

== Route ==
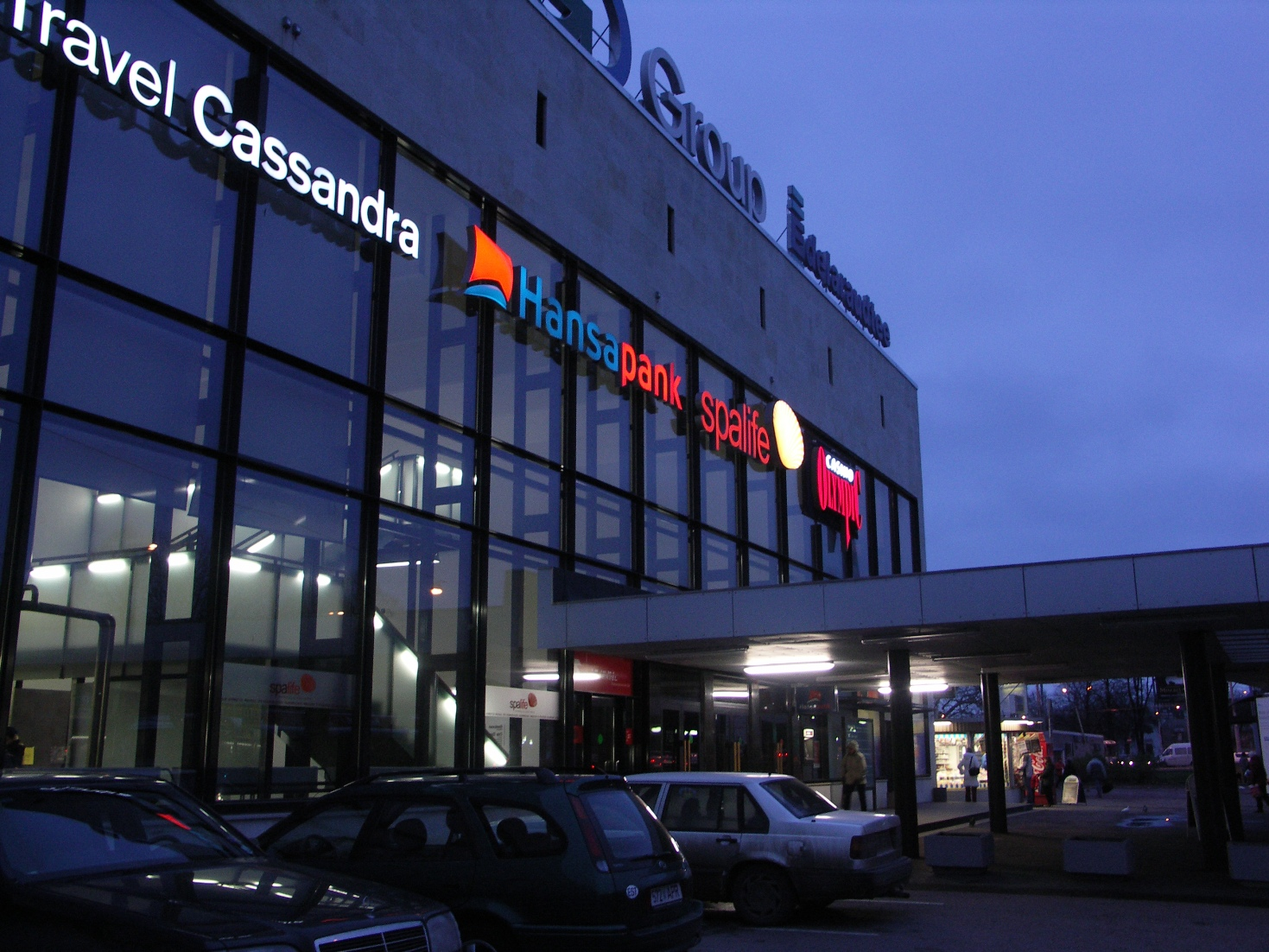
Tallinn Baltic Station

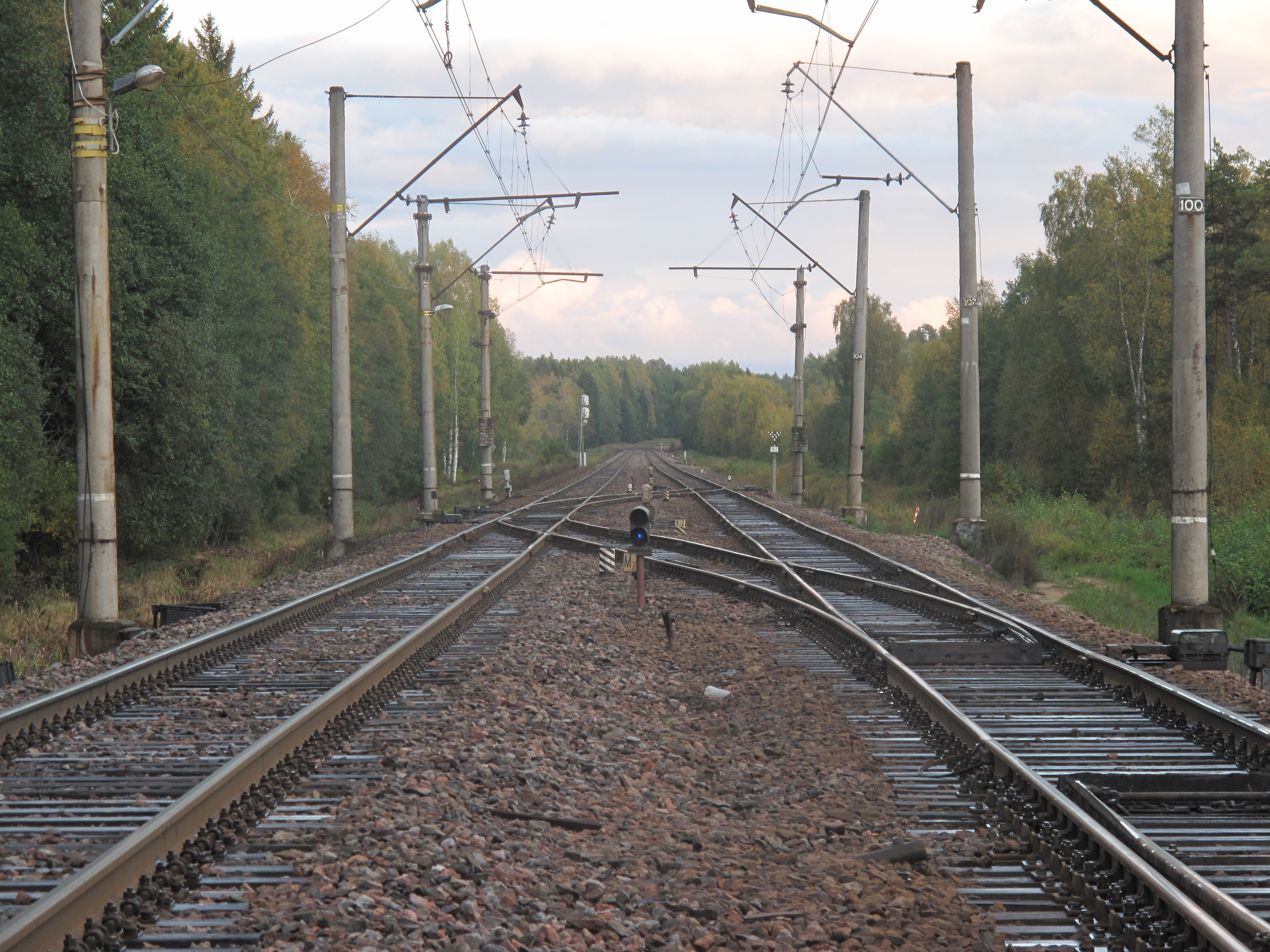
End of the electrified section in Aegviidu

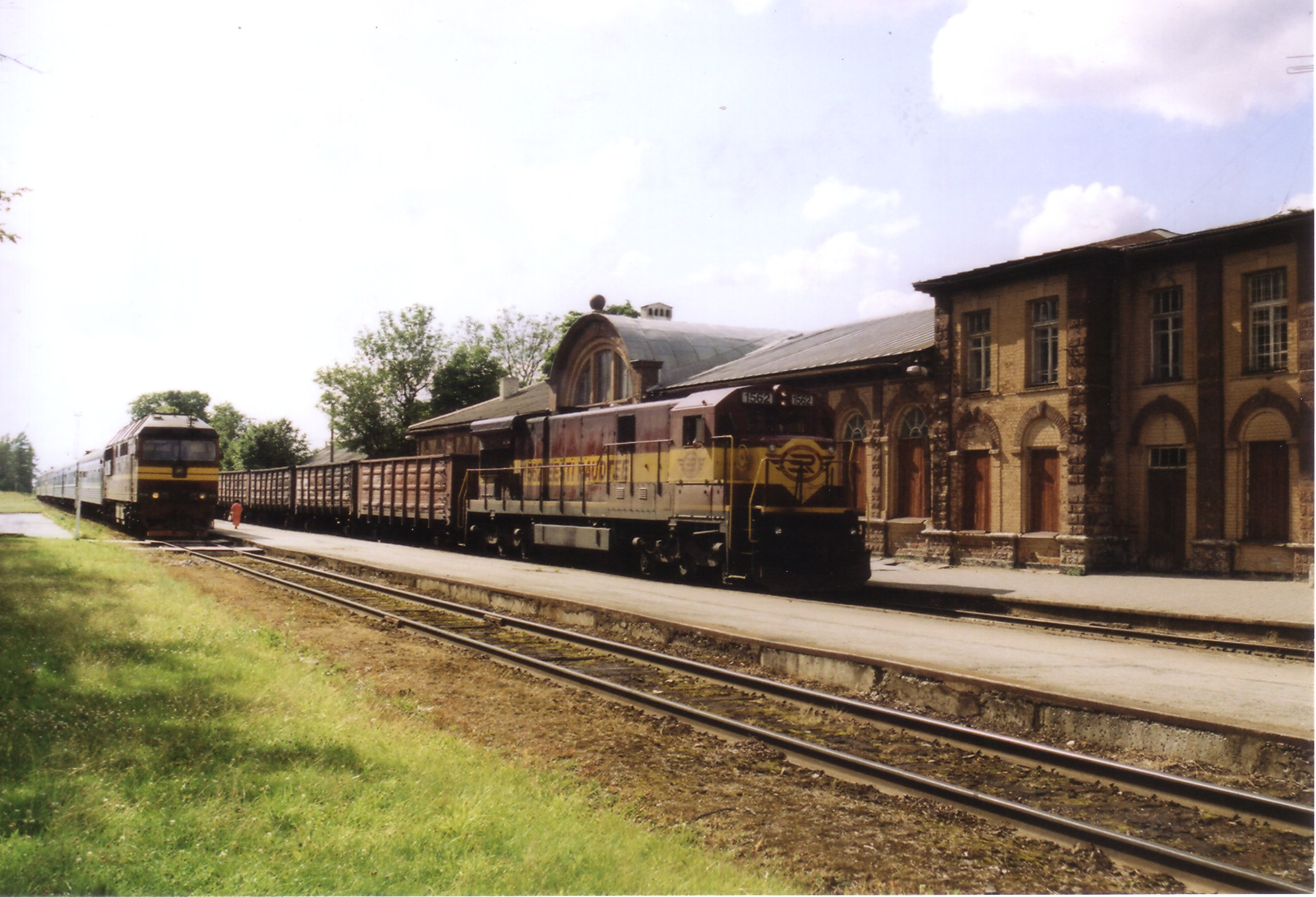
Tapa railway station

From Tallinn Baltic Station, trains travel around the centre of Tallinn through Kitseküla railway station heading eastwards towards Ülemiste train station. After Vesse station they leave borders of Tallinn and continue in a south-eastern direction through Harju County and Lääne-Viru County till Jäneda station, crossing several rivers on their way. After Jäneda the railway runs mainly in eastward direction till the end point in Tapa, where it splits to railways to Tartu and Narva.

Services are operated by Elron Stadler FLIRT trains, which replaced the DMU and EMU rolling stock of Edelaraudtee and Elektriraudtee.

== See also ==
- Edelaraudtee
- Eesti Raudtee
- Elektriraudtee
- GoRail
- Rail transport in Estonia
