= Tallinn–Narva railway =

Railway line in Estonia

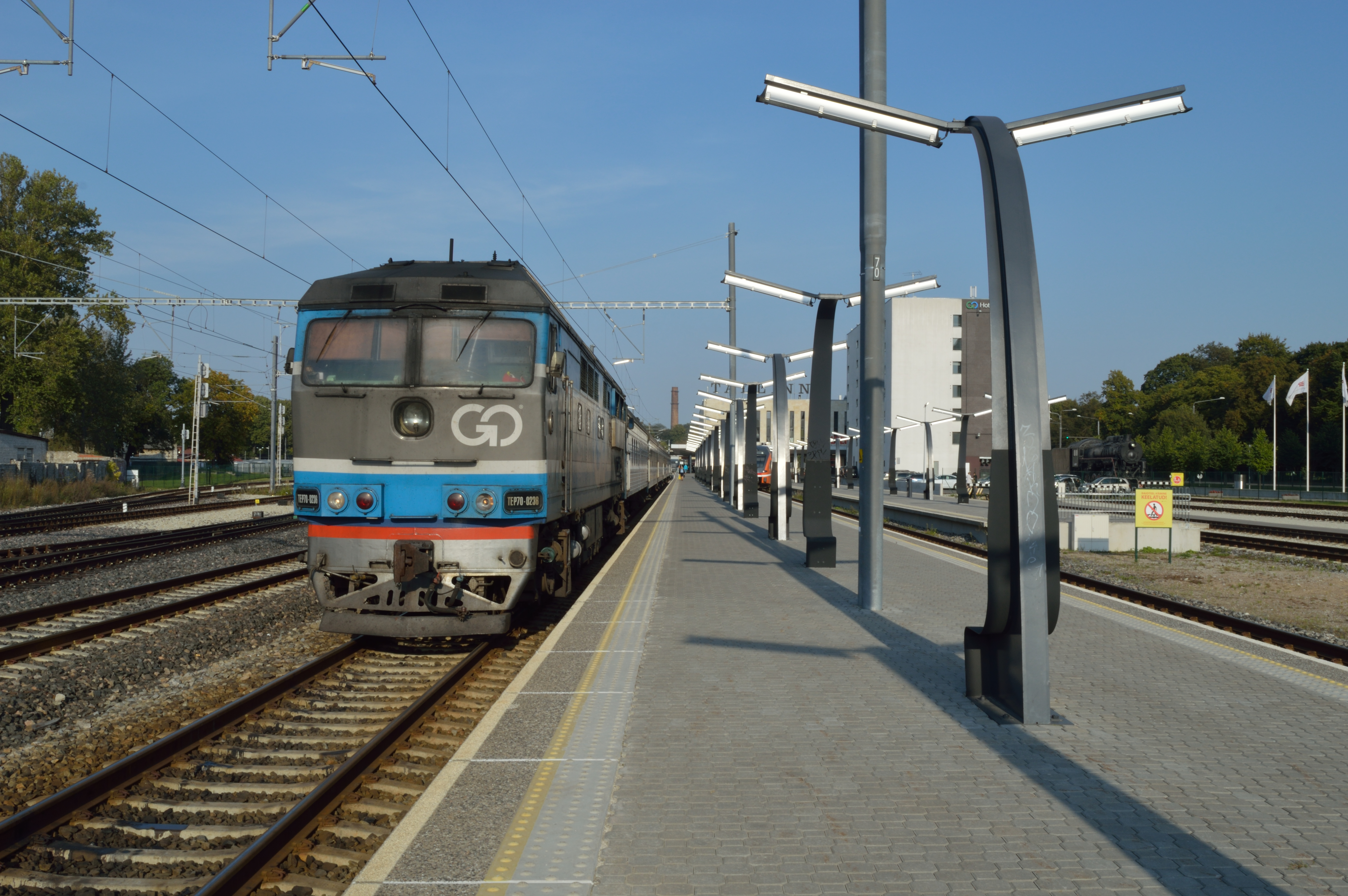
- GoRail sleeper service to Moscow

Overview
- Status: Operational
- Owner: Eesti Raudtee
- Locale: Northern Estonia, Estonia
- Termini: Balti jaam, Tallinn; Narva railway station, Narva
- Stations: 37

Service
- Type: Heavy rail
- System: Eesti Raudtee
- Operator(s): Elron & GoRail

History
- Opened: 1870

Technical
- Line length: 211 km (131 mi)
- Number of tracks: 2
- Character: International
- Track gauge: 1,520 mm (4 ft 11 27/32 in) Russian gauge
- Electrification: Partially Electrified
Route map

The Tallinn–Narva railway (Estonian: Tallinna–Narva raudtee) is a 211 km (131 mi) long railway line in Estonia which runs through Northern Estonia between Estonia's capital city Tallinn and the city of Narva on the border with Russia.

The 1,520 mm (4 ft 11 27/32 in) Russian gauge railway line is double track between Tallinn and Tapa and single track between Tapa and Narva. It is the oldest railway in Estonia, and was opened in 1870 when a railway line connecting Saint Petersburg with Paldiski via Tallinn was opened. A significant part of the railway load consists of freight trains (such as oil trains) from Russia to the ports of Tallinn and its immediate vicinity (Muuga, Tallinn and Paldiski Harbor).

== History ==
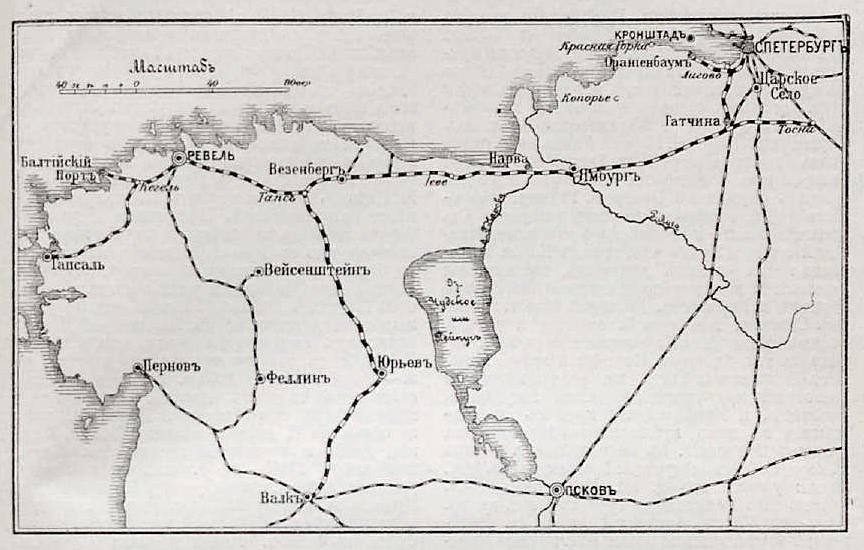
Railway lines of the Baltic Railway Company in 1911.

The railway line was completed in 1870 by the privately owned Baltic Railway Company. It was originally a part of the Baltic Railway line, which connected Saint Petersburg and Paldiski via Narva and Tallinn as a part of the railway network of the Russian Empire.

== Operations ==
The Tallinn–Narva railway line is owned and maintained by the railway infrastructure manager Eesti Raudtee (English: Estonian Railways Ltd), a government-owned railway infrastructure company of Estonia.

Passenger services operate across the entire stretch of line with regional services operated by Elron to Narva and Tartu.

== See also ==
- List of railway lines in Estonia
- Rail transport in Estonia
- History of rail transport in Estonia
- Transport in Estonia

== Bibliography ==
- Helme, Mehis (2018). Eesti raudteede 100 aastat [100 years of Estonian railways] (in Estonian). POST FACTUM. ISBN 9789949603350.
