= Kitseküla railway station =

Railway station in Tallinn, Estonia

Kitseküla
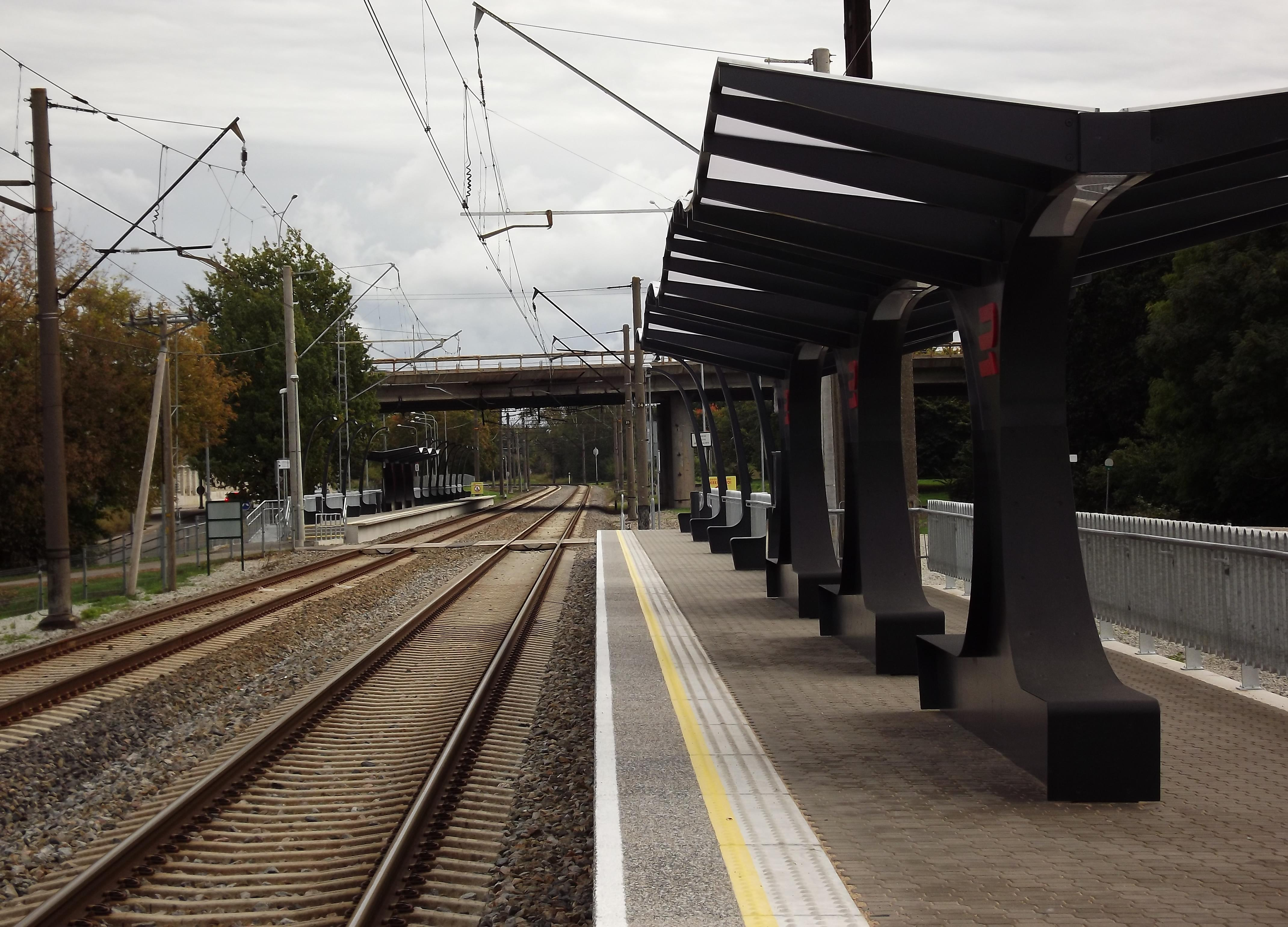
- Kitseküla railway station in 2013

General information
- Location: Kitseküla, Kesklinn, Tallinn, Harju County; Estonia
- Coordinates: 59°25′11.1″N 24°44′27.3″E
- System: railway station
- Owner: Eesti Raudtee (EVR)
- Platforms: 2
- Tracks: 2
- Train operators: Elron
- Connections: Buses 3 28 32 39 73

Construction
- Structure type: At-grade
- Accessible: yes

Other information
- Fare zone: I

History
- Opened: 10 November 2008; 17 years ago
- Electrified: 3 August 1978; 48 years ago

Services
Preceding station	Elron	Following station
Tallinn Terminus	Tallinn–Tartu–Valga	Ülemiste towards Valga
Tallinn Terminus	Tallinn–Tartu–Koidula	Ülemiste towards Koidula
Tallinn Terminus	Tallinn–Narva	Ülemiste towards Narva
Tallinn Terminus	Tallinn–Aegviidu	Ülemiste towards Aegviidu
Location
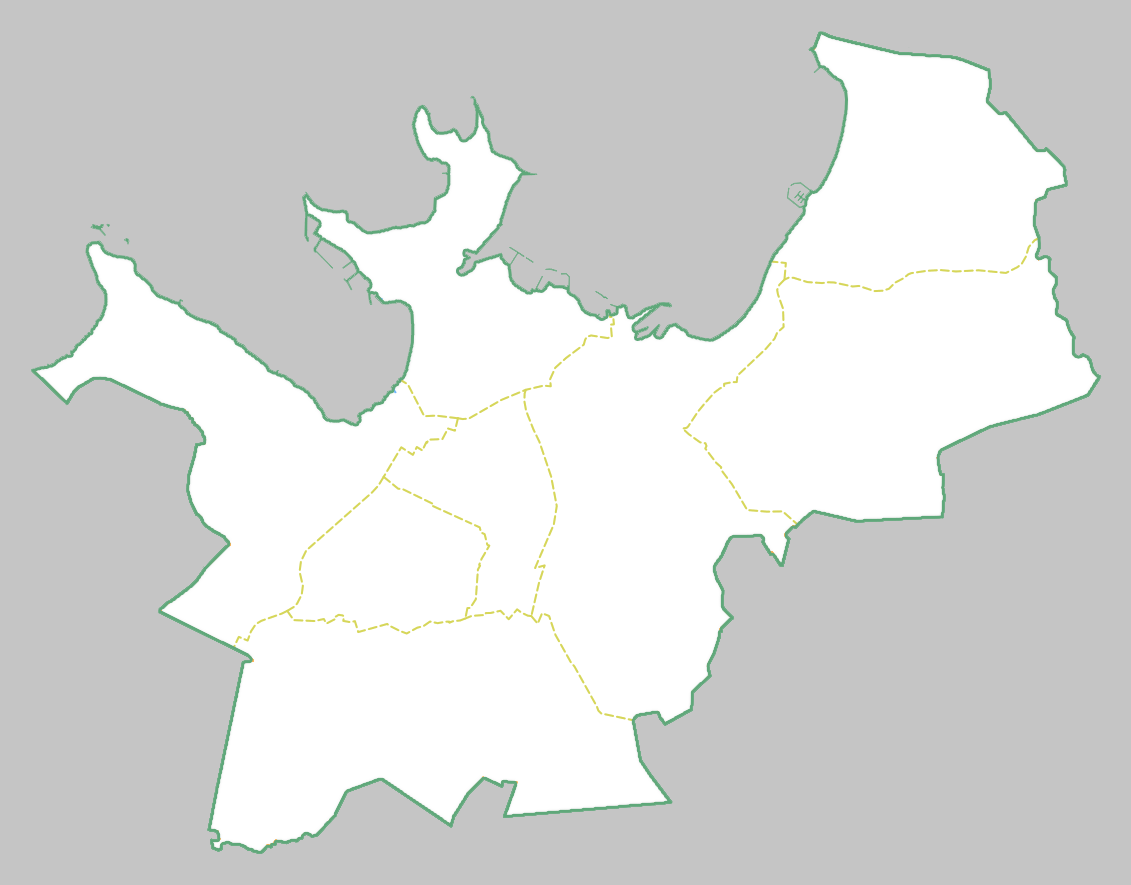
- Location within Estonia Location within Harju County Location within Tallinn

Kitseküla railway station (Estonian: Kitseküla raudteepeatus) is a railway station in the Kitseküla sub-district of Tallinn, the capital city of Estonia. It is located in central Tallinn, where the Tallinn–Narva railway crosses the road Pärnu maantee, and close to the East Tallinn Central Hospital and the Lilleküla Stadium. The station opened on 10 November 2008.

Kitseküla railway station is served by Express trains from Tallinn Baltic Station which stop at Kitseküla on their way to Tartu and Narva, as well as commuter trains to stations on the line to Aegviidu. All trains are operated by the national passenger train operating company, Elron.

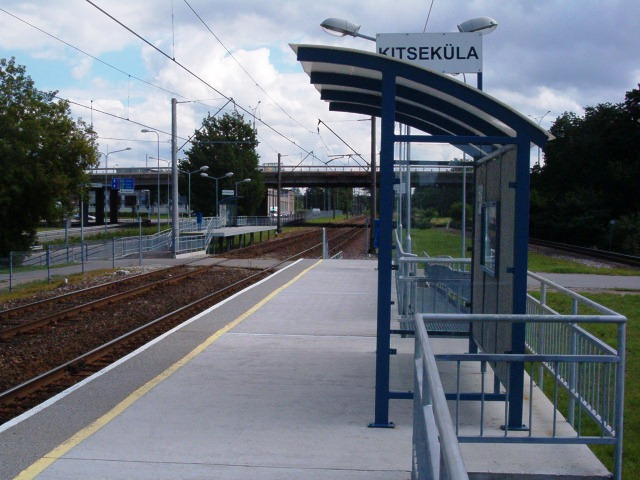
Kitseküla station in 2009. In the background the Pärnu maantee viaduct.

== See also ==
- List of railway stations in Estonia
- Rail transport in Estonia
