= Ülemiste railway station =

Railway station in Tallinn, Estonia

Ülemiste
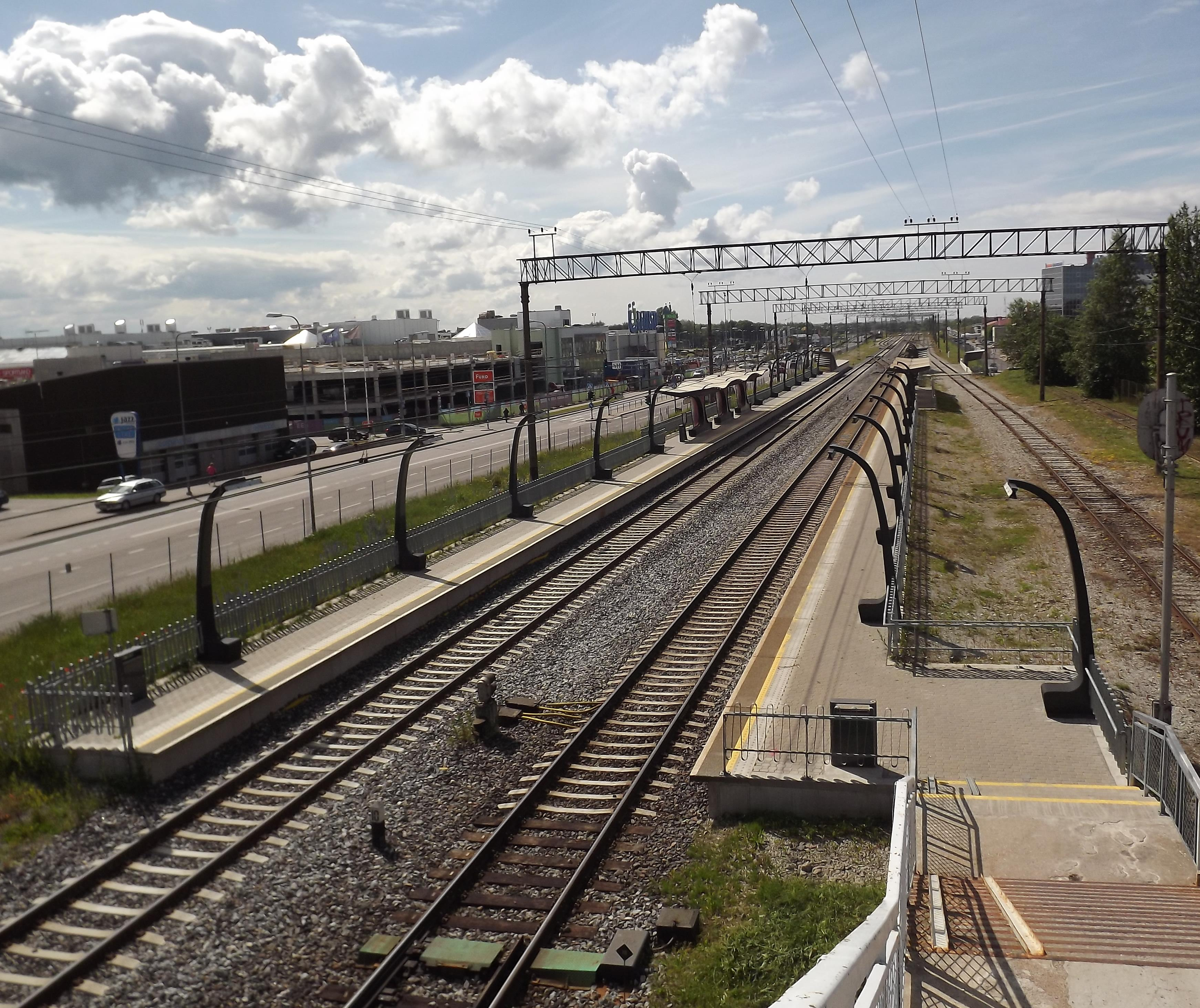
- Ülemiste railway station in 2014

General information
- Location: Ülemiste, Lasnamäe, Tallinn, Harju County; Estonia
- Coordinates: 59°25′24″N 24°47′46″E
- System: railway station
- Owner: Eesti Raudtee (EVR)
- Platforms: 2
- Tracks: 2
- Train operators: Elron
- Connections: Buses 7 13 15 45 47 49 Regional Buses 103

Other information
- Fare zone: I

History
- Opened: 1900
- Electrified: 3 August 1978; 48 years ago

Services
| Preceding station | Elron | Following station |
|---|---|---|
| Kitseküla towards Tallinn | Tallinn–Tartu–Valga | Kehra towards Valga |
| Kitseküla towards Tallinn | Tallinn–Tartu–Koidula | Kehra towards Koidula |
| Kitseküla towards Tallinn | Tallinn–Narva | Kehra towards Narva |
| Kitseküla towards Tallinn | Tallinn–Aegviidu | Vesse towards Aegviidu |
Future services
| Preceding station | Rail Baltica | Following station |
|---|---|---|
| Terminus | Rail Baltica | Pärnu |
| Preceding station | Trams in Tallinn | Following station |
| Ülemiste linnak towards Lennujaam | 2 opening 2025 | Majaka põik towards Kopli |
Location

Ülemiste railway station (Estonian: Ülemiste raudteejaam) is a railway station in the Ülemiste sub-district of Tallinn, the capital city of Estonia. It is located approximately 500 metres from Tallinn Airport.

The station is served by the trains of the Estonian government-owned passenger train operator, Elron. Express trains from Tallinn Baltic Station stop at Ülemiste on the way to Tartu and Narva, and there is a commuter service to stations on the line to Tapa.

== Rail Baltica ==
Ülemiste station will be the location of Rail Baltica's Tallinn terminus, which is planned to open in 2032. When the line is complete, high-speed trains on Rail Baltica will connect the three Baltic capitals to Poland using the new standard-gauge railway.

An international competition was held to find a design for the new terminal with "Light Stream" by Zaha Hadid Architects being declared as the winner. The new "Linda" terminal will be directly linked to Tallinn Airport by a pedestrian bridge.

On 21 May 2025, Rail Baltic Estonia signed a construction contract with an Estonian construction company. Construction of the terminal began in November 2025, and the building is scheduled to be in taken over by the railway company in October 2028.

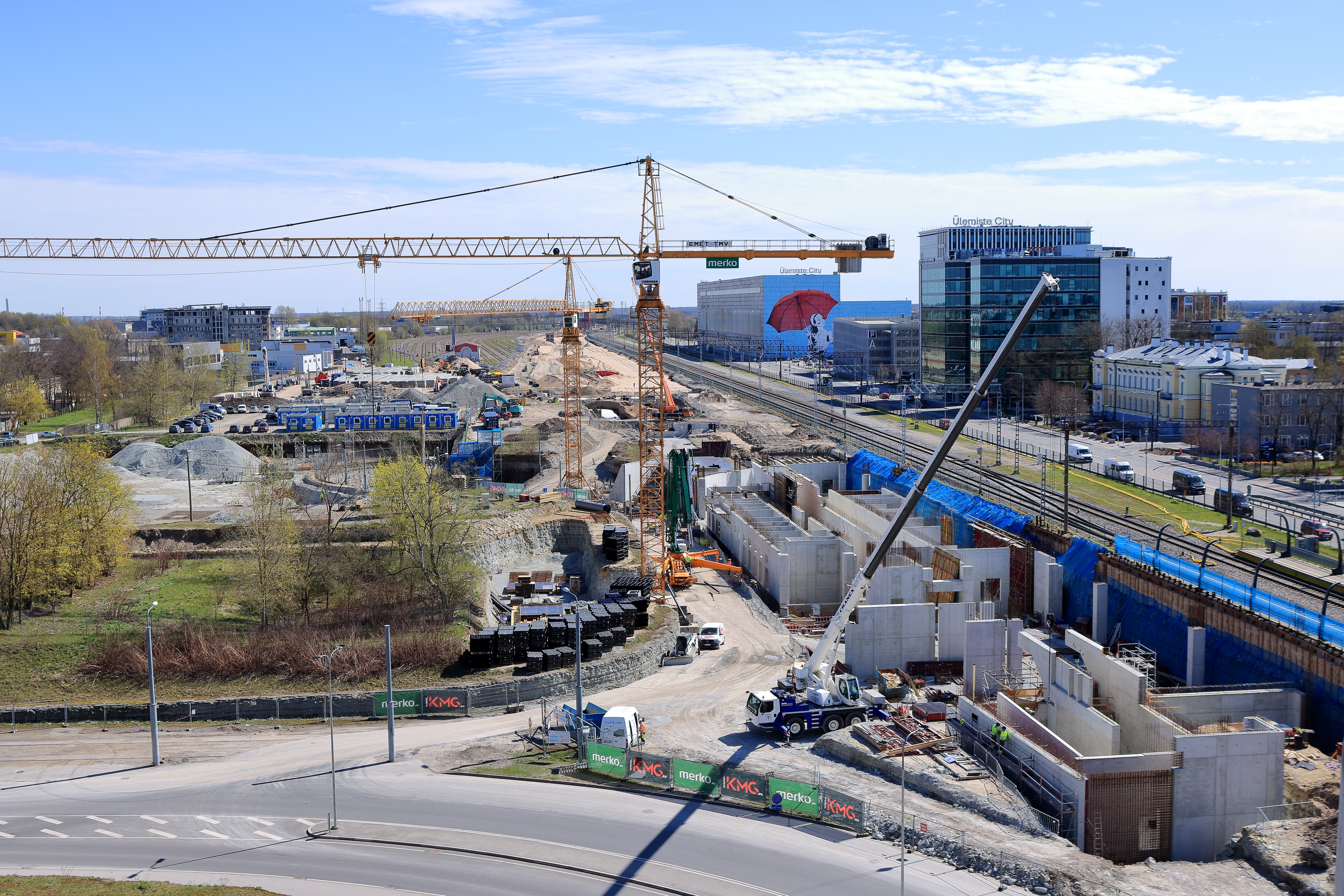
Construction of Rail Baltica Ülemiste terminal, May 2024 (view from T1 mall)

Construction of Rail Baltica Ülemiste terminal, October 2026

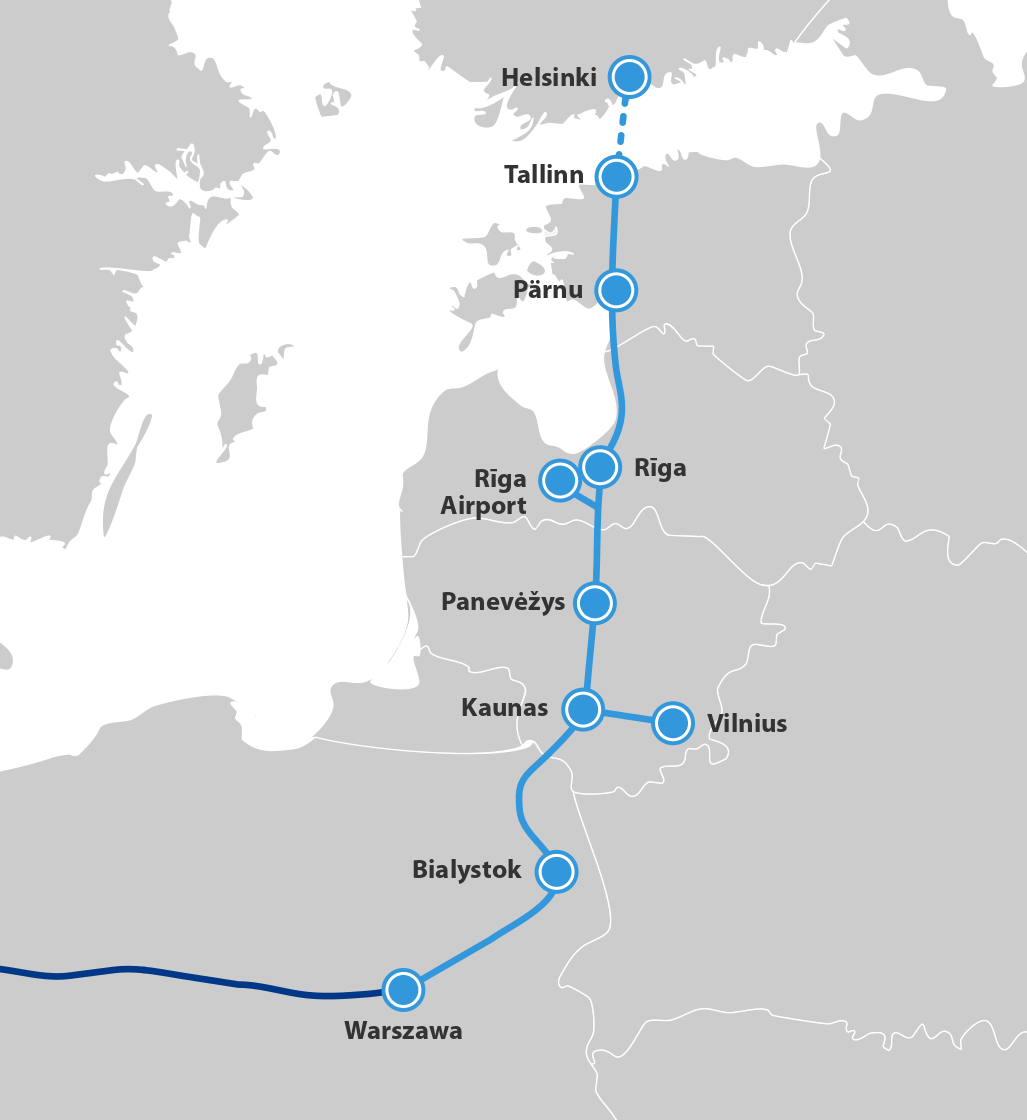

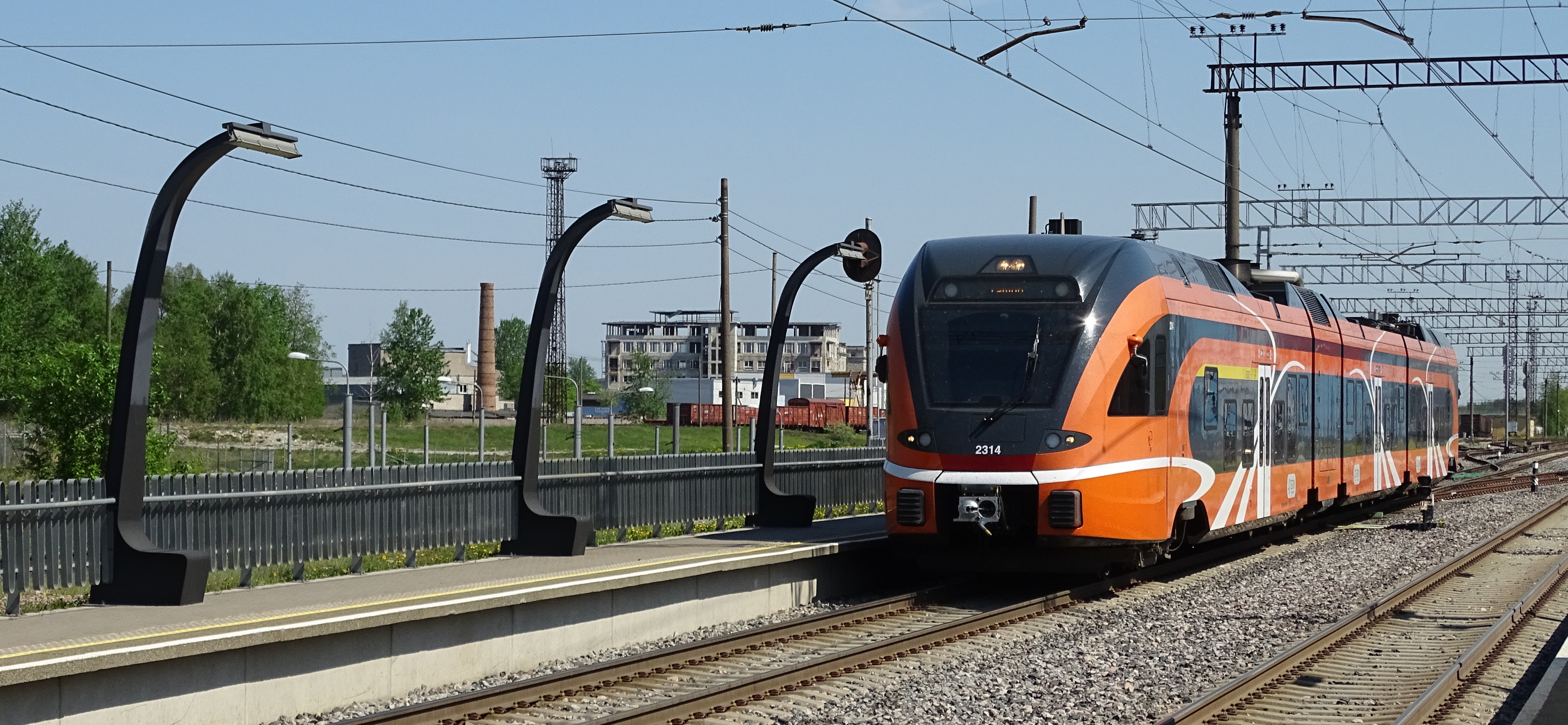
Ülemiste railway station in 2018

== See also ==
- List of railway stations in Estonia
- Rail transport in Estonia
- Pärnu railway station
