= Vesse =

Vesse may refer to:

- Vesse, rail station in Sõjamäe, Tallinn, Estonia
- Vesse, leader of the Oeselians in St. George's Night Uprising
