= Kitseküla =

Subdistrict of Tallinn, Estonia

Coordinates: 59.414802°N 24.739645°E

- Subdistrict of Tallinn
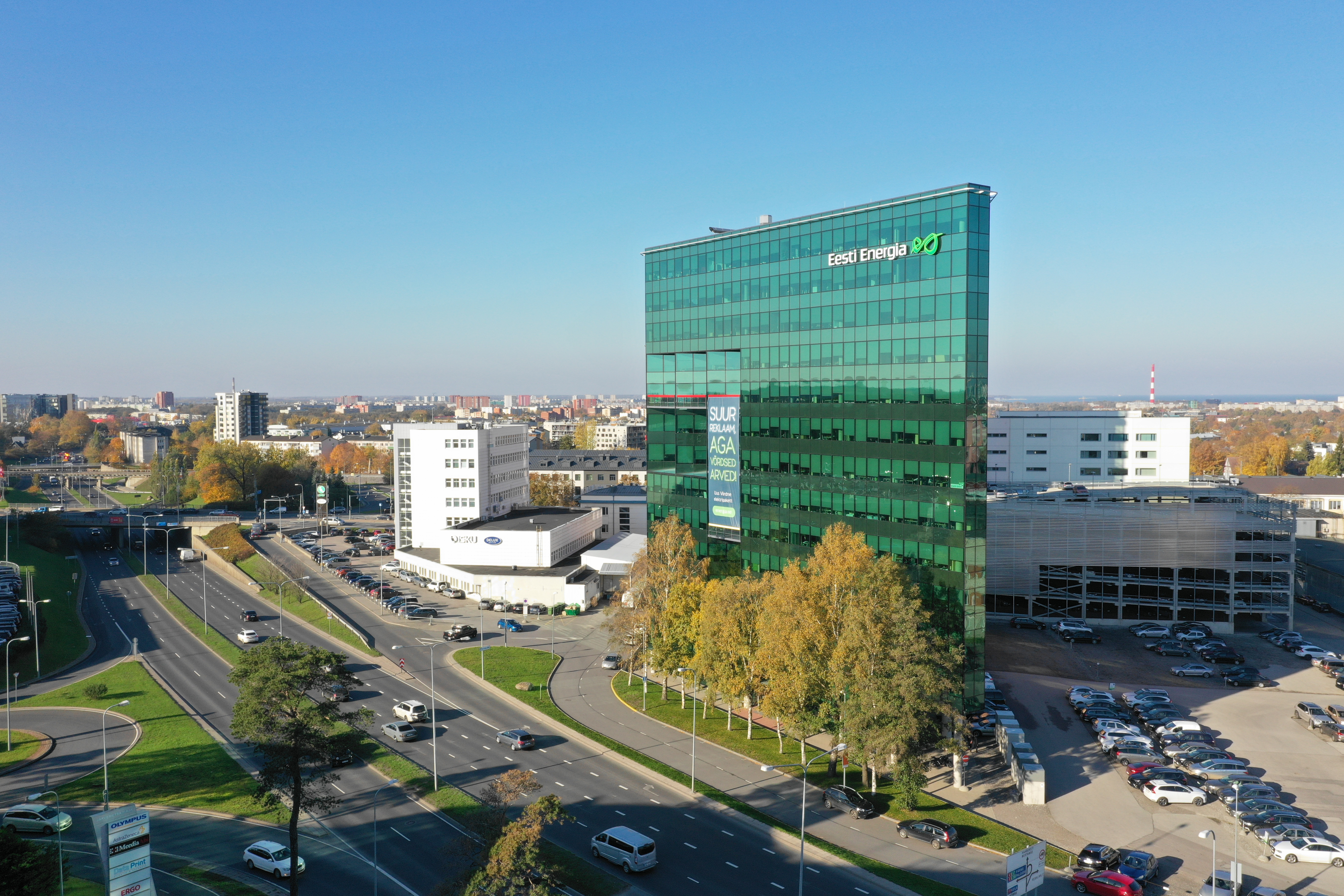
- The headquarters of Eesti Energia are located at Lelle 22

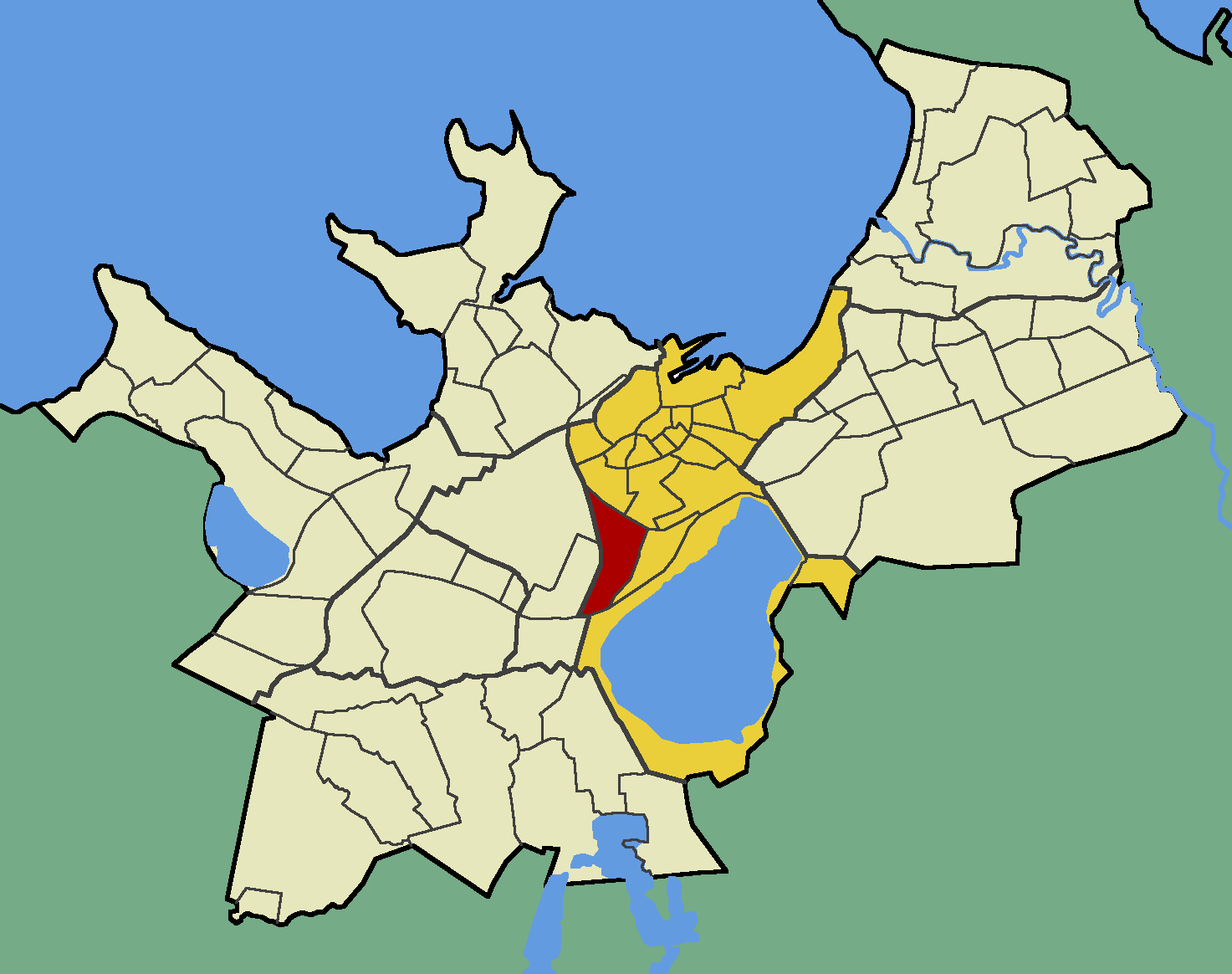
- Kitseküla within the district of Kesklinn (Midtown).
- Country: Estonia
- County: Harju County
- City: Tallinn
- District: Kesklinn

Population (01.01.2026)
  - Total: 5,630

Kitseküla (Estonian for "Goat Village") is a subdistrict (asum) of the district of Kesklinn (Midtown) in Tallinn, the capital of Estonia. It has a population of 5,630 (As of 1 January 2026).

Kitseküla is situated between two railway corridors so there are several stations surrounding it: "Tallinn-Väike" on the Tallinn–Pärnu/Viljandi line; "Lilleküla", "Tondi" and "Järve" on Tallinn–Paldiski/Turba line and "Kitseküla" on Tallinn–Aegviidu line. All these stations are served by Elron trains.

Lilleküla Stadium, the national stadium of Estonia, home to the Estonia national football team, FC Flora and FCI Levadia, is located in the northwestern corner of Kitseküla, between the diverging railway lines.

== Gallery ==
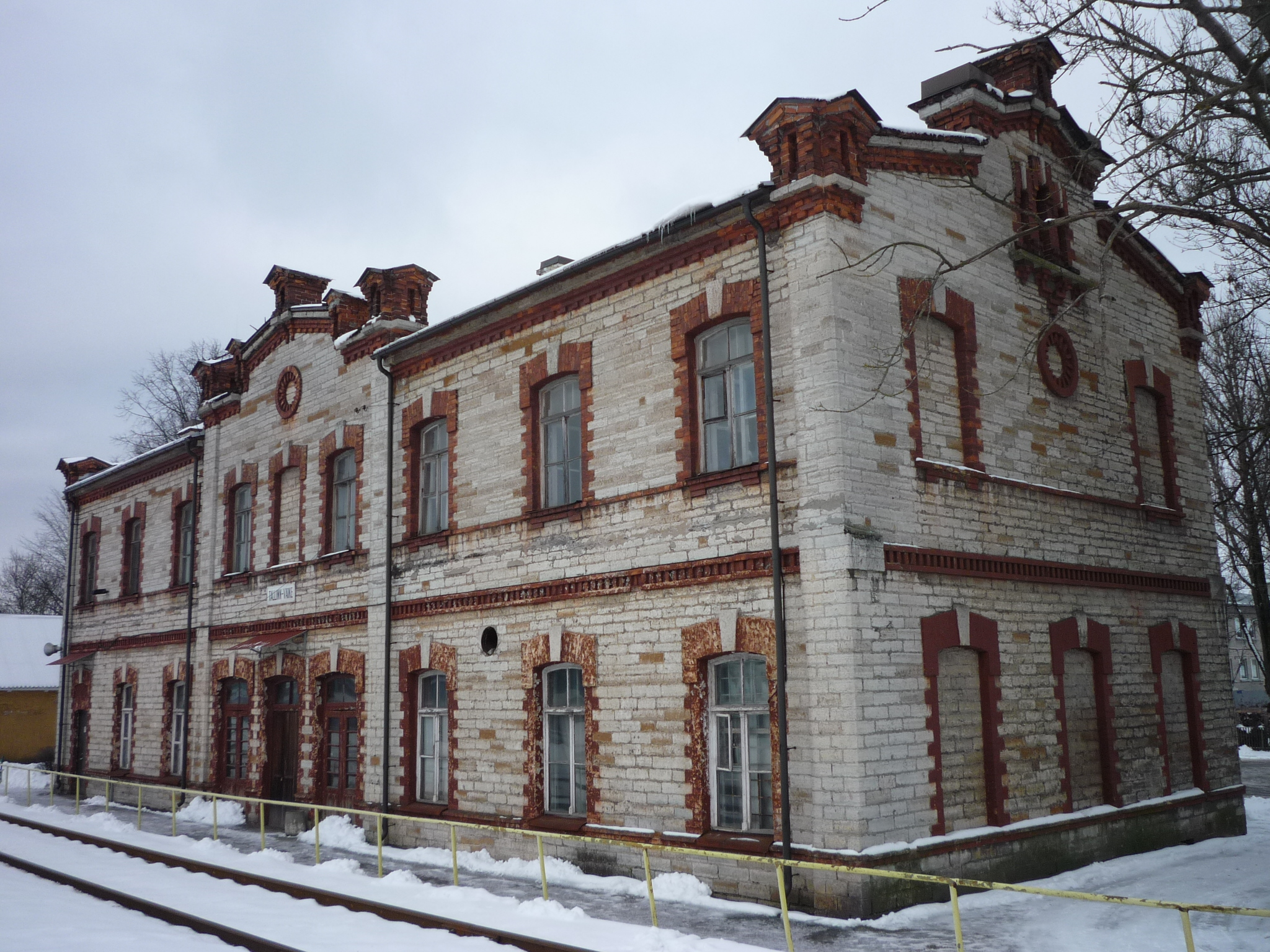
Tallinn-Väike train station

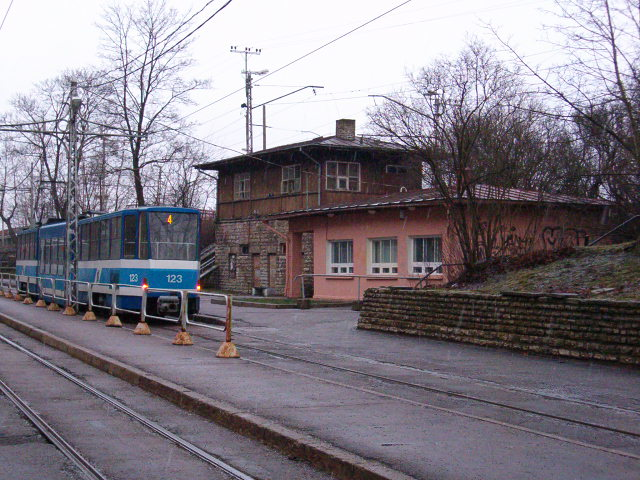
Tondi train and tram station

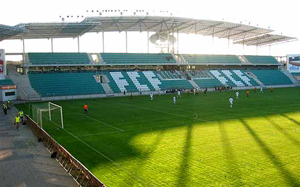
Lilleküla Stadium, the home ground of the Estonia national football team and FC Flora Tallinn.

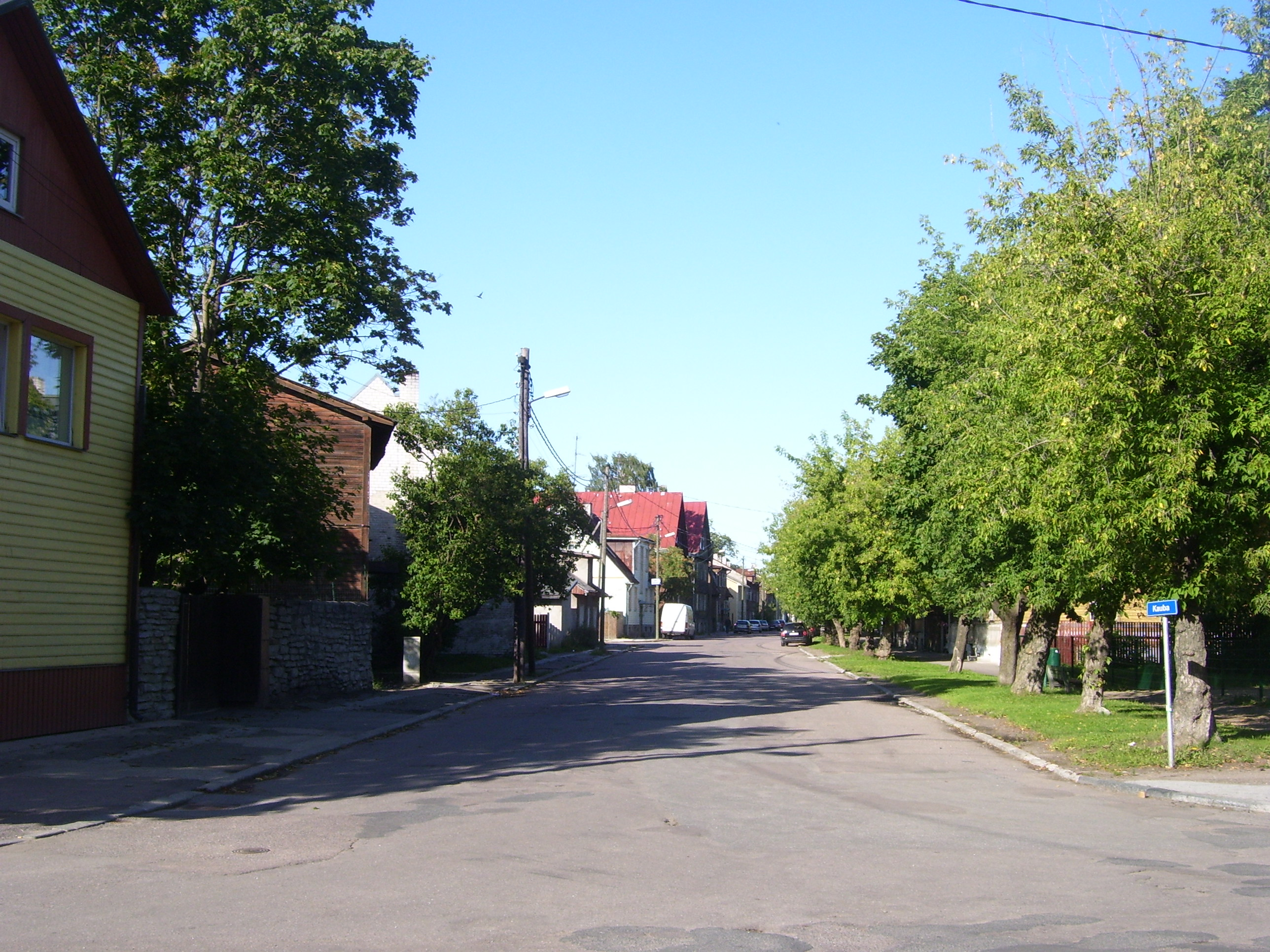
Kauba street
