= Pärnu railway station =

Former railway station in Pärnu, Estonia

Historical railway stations in Pärnu

The city of Pärnu in Estonia had a railway station from 1896 to 2018, although the location of the station changed several times. The first phase of a new high-speed rail line, Rail Baltica, is planned to open in 2032, and will eventually run from Tallinn to Warsaw via Pärnu.

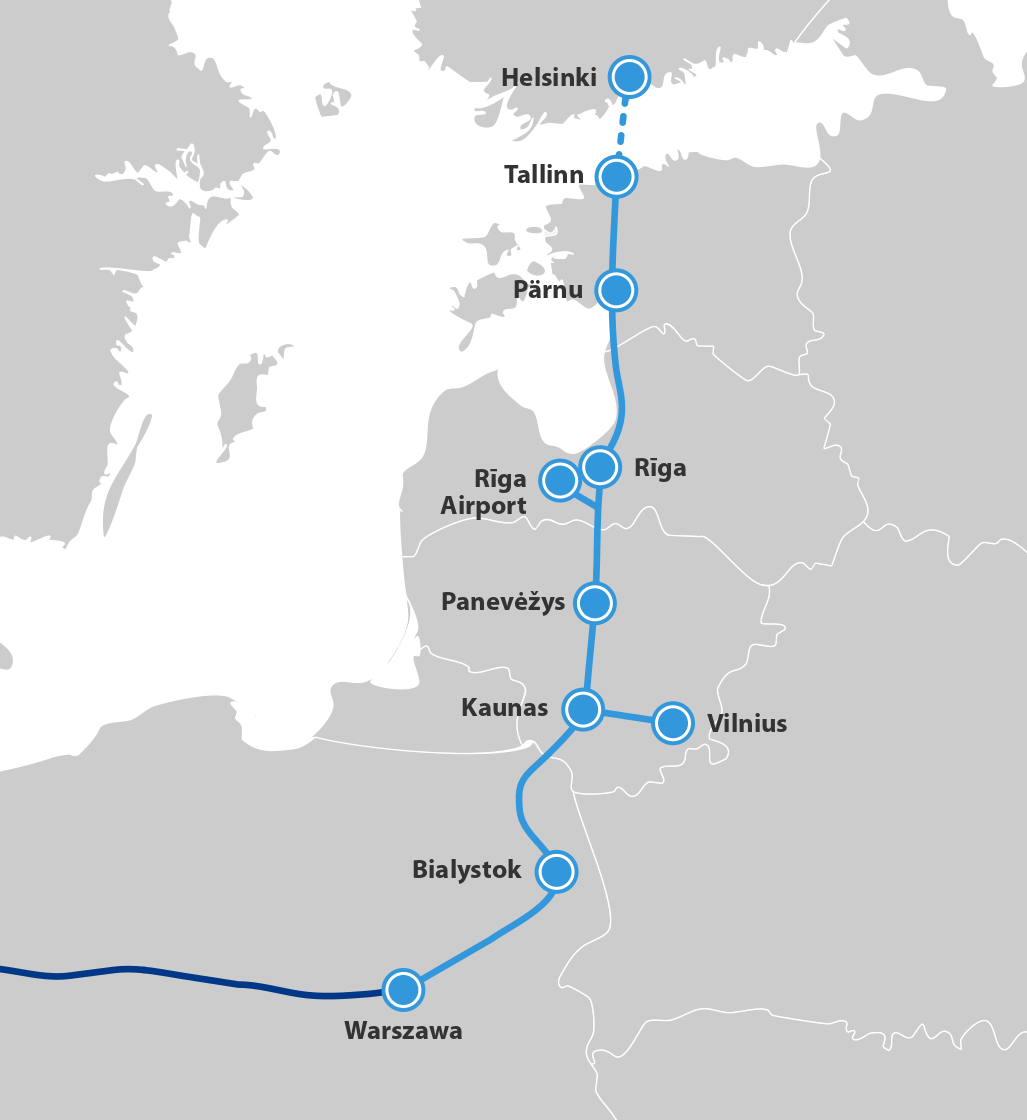
Map of the under-construction Rail Baltica line

== History ==
The original railway station at Pikk street in the centre of Pärnu opened in 1896, and a station in Papiniidu opened at the same time. Both stations closed in 1972 and were replaced by Pärnu kaubajaam (to the north-east of the city) and in 1976 by a new through station in the Raeküla district. The first Tallinn–Pärnu–Riga trains ran in 1981, with the service to Riga being discontinued in 1992. The line south of Pärnu to Mõisaküla on the Latvian border was dismantled in 2008.

On 1 January 2014 the Soviet era Raeküla station was replaced by a new halt near Liivi road in Papiniidu. The Pärnu-Lelle section of the line to Tallinn was permanently closed for passenger operations in 2018, as it required a €17 million refurbishment. The last train from Pärnu Halt departed on 8 December 2018, with a journey time of 2½ hours to Tallinn.

== Rail Baltica ==
A new station or "International Passenger Terminal" will be constructed near the site of the former Pärnu Halt as part of the Rail Baltica project. The main station building will be located above the platforms and will house a 90-seat waiting area, cafeteria and information centre. The journey time to Tallinn is expected to be 40 minutes, and to Riga one hour.

In 2024, Estonian Minister of Infrastructure Vladimir Svet proposed that domestic train services between Pärnu and Tallinn Ülemiste could start before the completion of the entire Rail Baltica line, as the track between Pärnu and Riga Central is likely to one of the last sections completed.

Preceding station	Rail Baltica	Following station
Riga, Latvia	Rail Baltica	Tallinn, Estonia terminus

== Timeline of Pärnu's railway stations ==
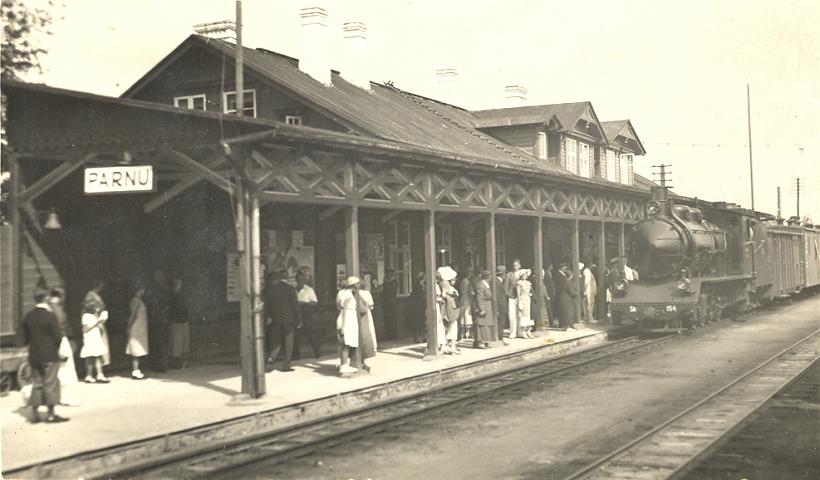
The original station on Pikk street (1930)
1896–1972

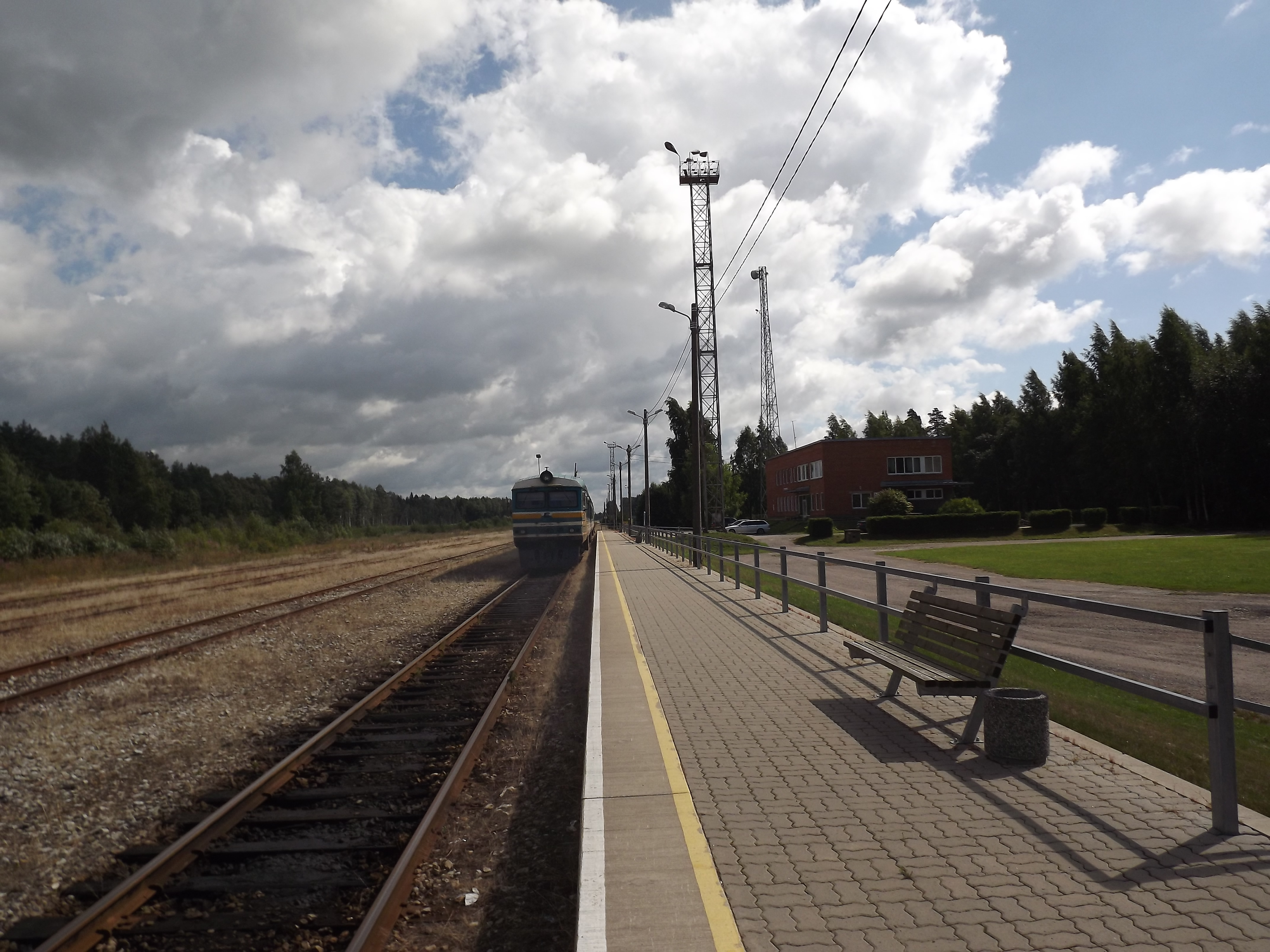
Pärnu kaubajaam (freight station)
1971–2018

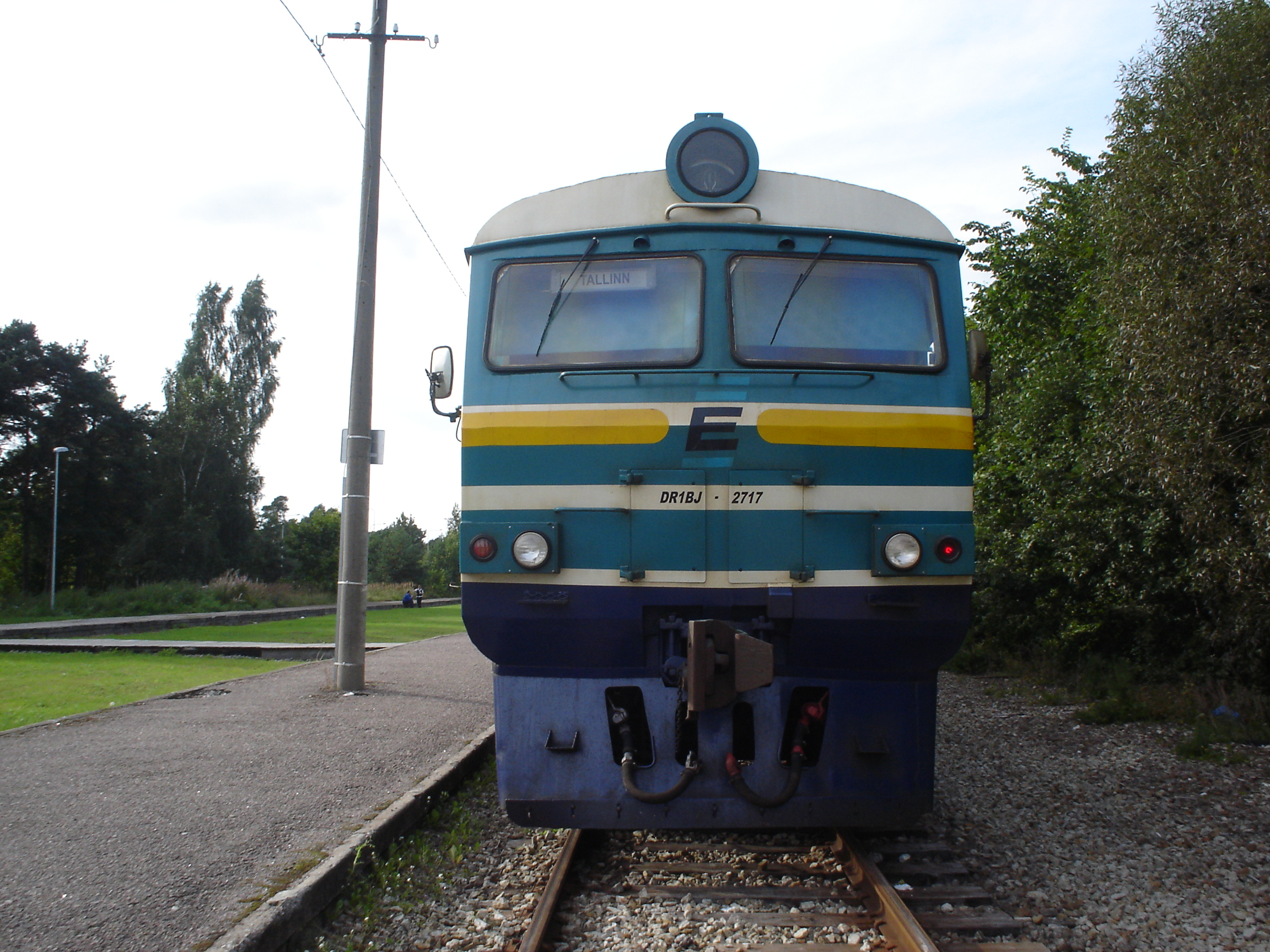
Pärnu station, Raeküla
1976–2013

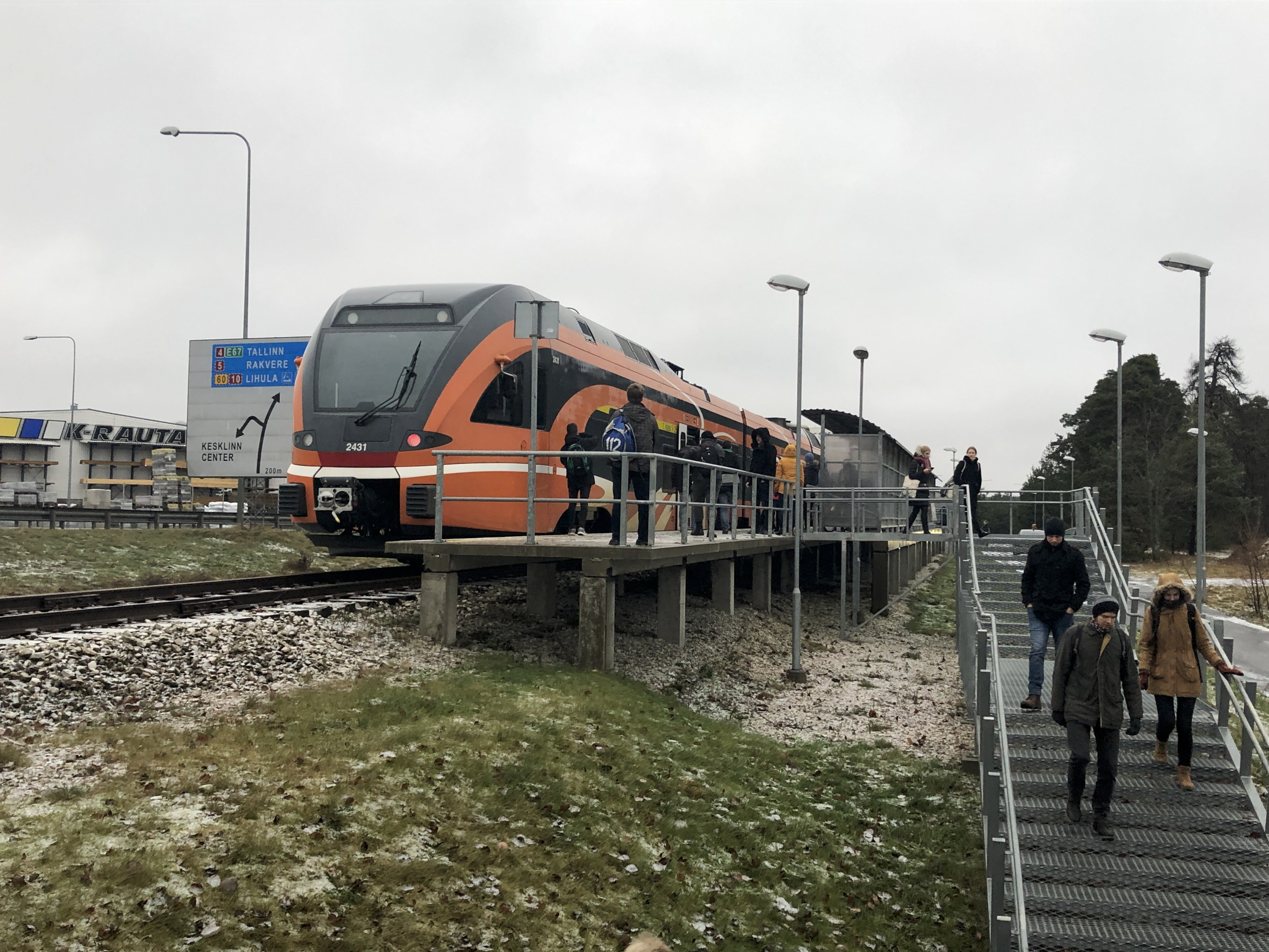
Pärnu Halt, Papiniidu
2014–2018

== See also ==
- Tallinn Ülemiste railway station
