= GoRail =

Company based in Estonia

Coordinates: 59.44°N 24.737279°E

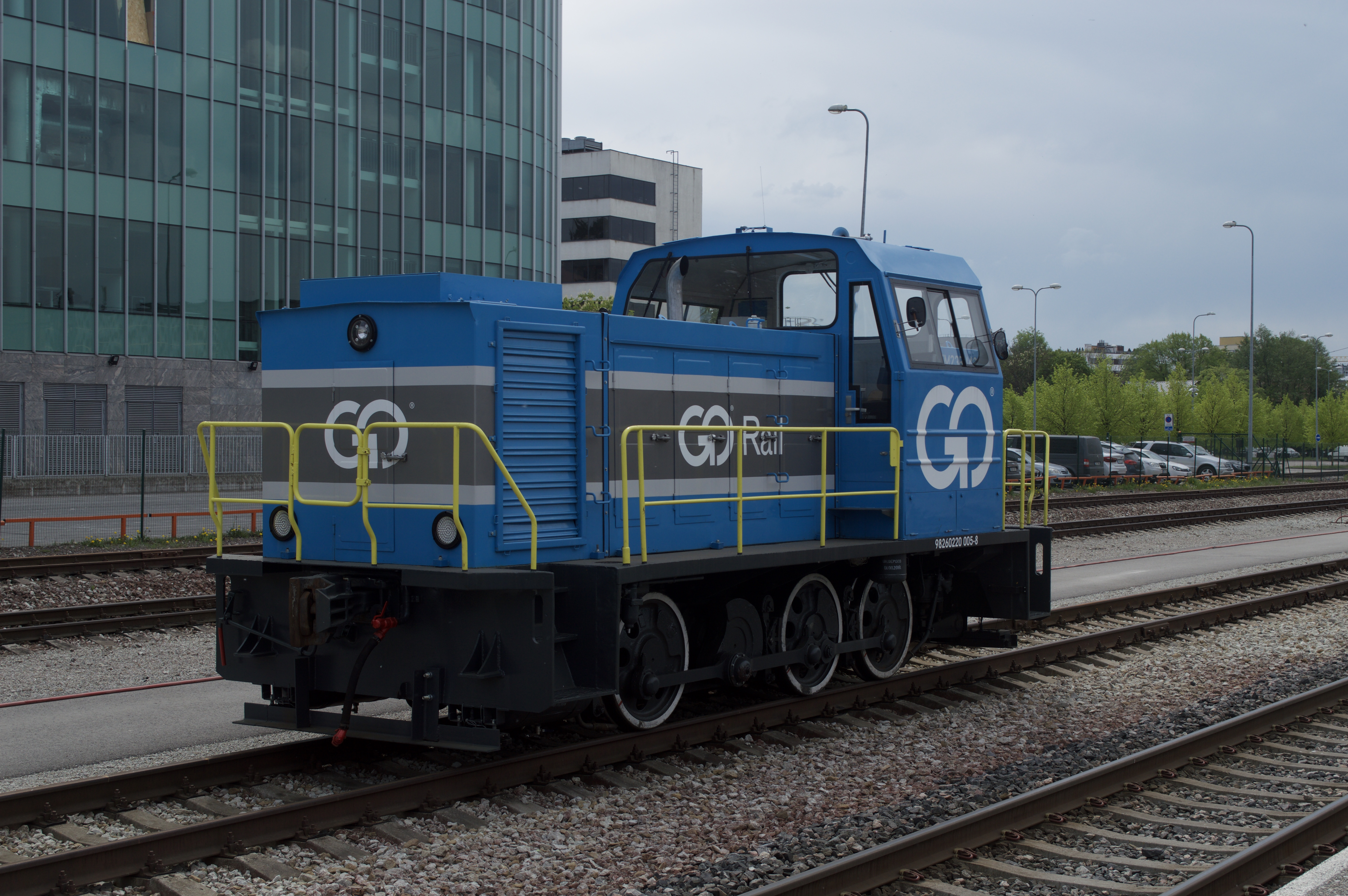
GoRail locomotive

GoRail is a rail freight operator in Estonia, and also offers related training services. Until commencing offering freight services in 2019 it was a passenger service operator, and until 2020 it operated the only direct international passenger rail services from Estonia (however it is possible to travel to Riga in Latvia by changing from Elron services to Valga onto Pasažieru vilciens services).

== History ==
The company previously operated under the name EVR Ekspress as a division of the state railway, Eesti Raudtee. It was partially privatised on 1 April 1999, with a 51% majority share going to the Fraser Group and 49% retained by Eesti Raudtee. The company was renamed GoRail in 2006 when it was sold to the Go Group, which operates various other travel services in Estonia, including Tallinn's main Baltic Station.

== Tallinn - St Petersburg and Moscow rail services ==
GoRail previously ran a number of variants of services from the Baltic station in Tallinn to St Petersburg and / or Moscow, in partnership with Russian Railways, which were cancelled and re-introduced a number of times.

GoRail ran a daily daytime service from Tallinn Baltic station to St Petersburg, leaving Tallinn early in the morning and arriving in St Petersburg mid-afternoon, with a return service leaving in the early evening and arriving in Tallinn in the late evening.

After a break from 2004, services commenced during 2007. However, during this time, on 8 May 2007, Russian Railways announced that the route would be cancelled with effect from 29 May ostensibly due to low passenger numbers, but shortly after the Bronze Night protests in Tallinn. GO Rail CEO Alar Pinsel described the Russian reasoning as "difficult to believe". The cancellation was retracted a day later, and the train service was never actually interrupted. GoRail announced the cancellation of the service in July 2008, citing high infrastructure and fuel costs as reasons.

Services then ran again, continuing to Moscow, from 2012 until they ended in 2020 at the beginning of the coronavirus pandemic.

== See also ==
- Rail transport in Estonia
- Oktyabrskaya Railway
