= Narva railway station =

Railway station in Narva, Estonia

Narva
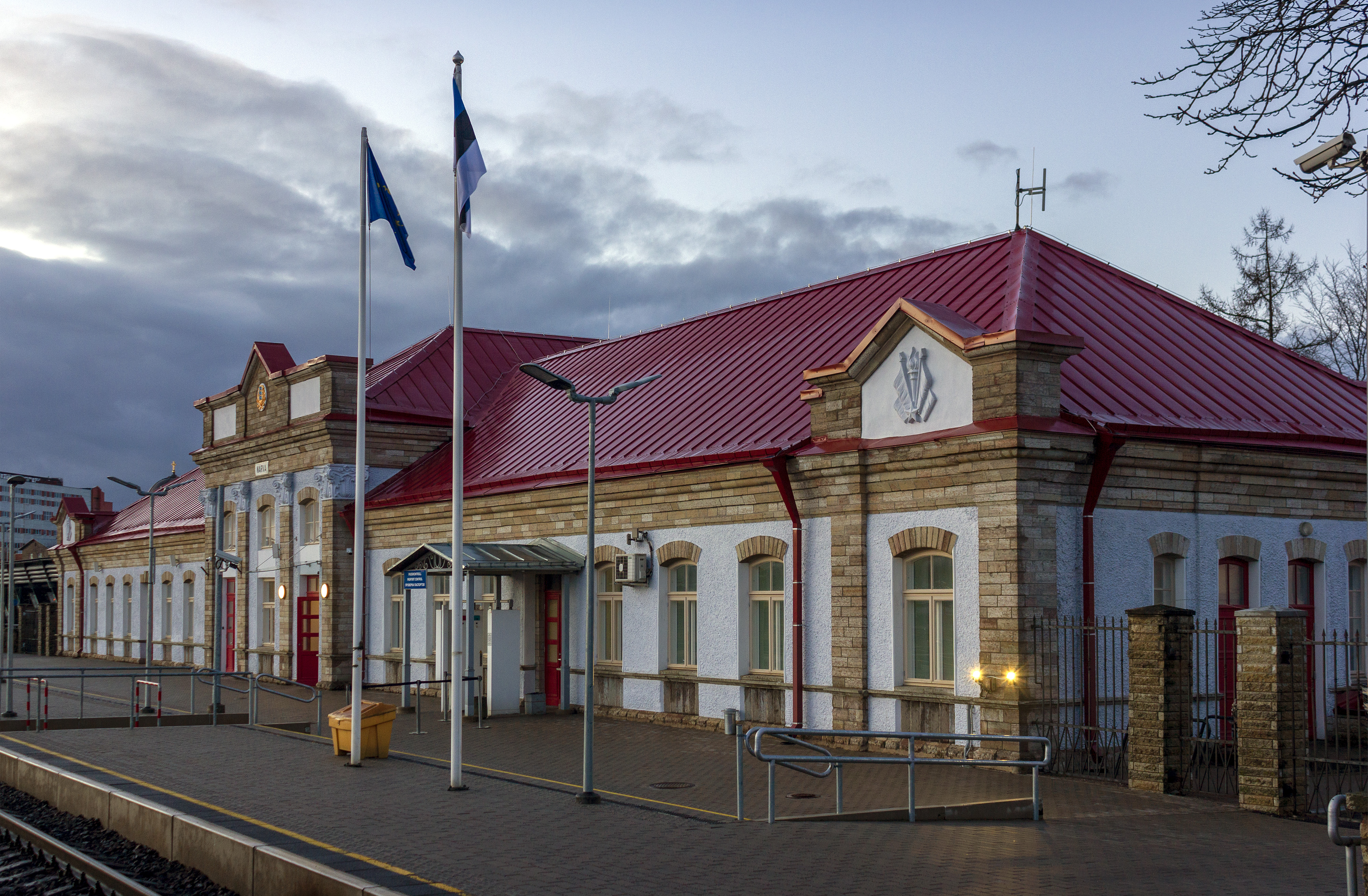

General information
- Location: Vaksali 23b 20308 Narva; Ida-Viru County; Estonia
- Coordinates: 59°22′7″N 28°11′57″E
- System: railway station
- Owner: Eesti Raudtee
- Operator: Elron
- Line: Tallinn-Narva railway
- Platforms: 2
- Tracks: 2
- Connections: Buses 31 32 35A 35S 85 87 Coaches 175 190 340 342 344 347 368 384 396 746 800 805

Construction
- Structure type: At-grade
- Accessible: yes

Other information
- Fare zone: None (station-based ticket price)

History
- Opened: 1870

Services
| Preceding station | Elron | Following station |
|---|---|---|
| Vaivara towards Tallinn | Tallinn–Narva | Terminus |
Location
- Location within Estonia

Narva railway station (Estonian: Narva raudteejaam) is the easternmost railway station in Estonia, serving the city of Narva on the border between Estonia and Russia.

The station was opened in 1870 as the Baltic Railway Company opened the 400 km (250 mi) long Saint Petersburg–Tallinn–Paldiski railway line. The Tallinn–Narva railway (211 km) is a part of that railway line. The first station building was destroyed in 1919 during the Estonian War of Independence. The second station building was constructed in 1922 and demolished during World War II.

Following World War II, the current neoclassical station building was constructed.

The station building today hosts a passport control and customs office, which are open when trains to/from Russia depart/arrive. The waiting hall is open during daytime, but has no facilities, such as luggage lockers, WC nor a ticket office (the nearby bus station has a toilet but no left luggage service). Access to platforms is only possible in conjunction with train departures and arrivals.

In the 2026 timetable, there are 5 passenger trains a day to Tallinn Balti jaam operated by Elron.

== See also ==
- List of railway stations in Estonia
- Rail transport in Estonia
