= Tallinn Baltic Station =

Main railway station of Tallinn, Estonia

Balti jaam
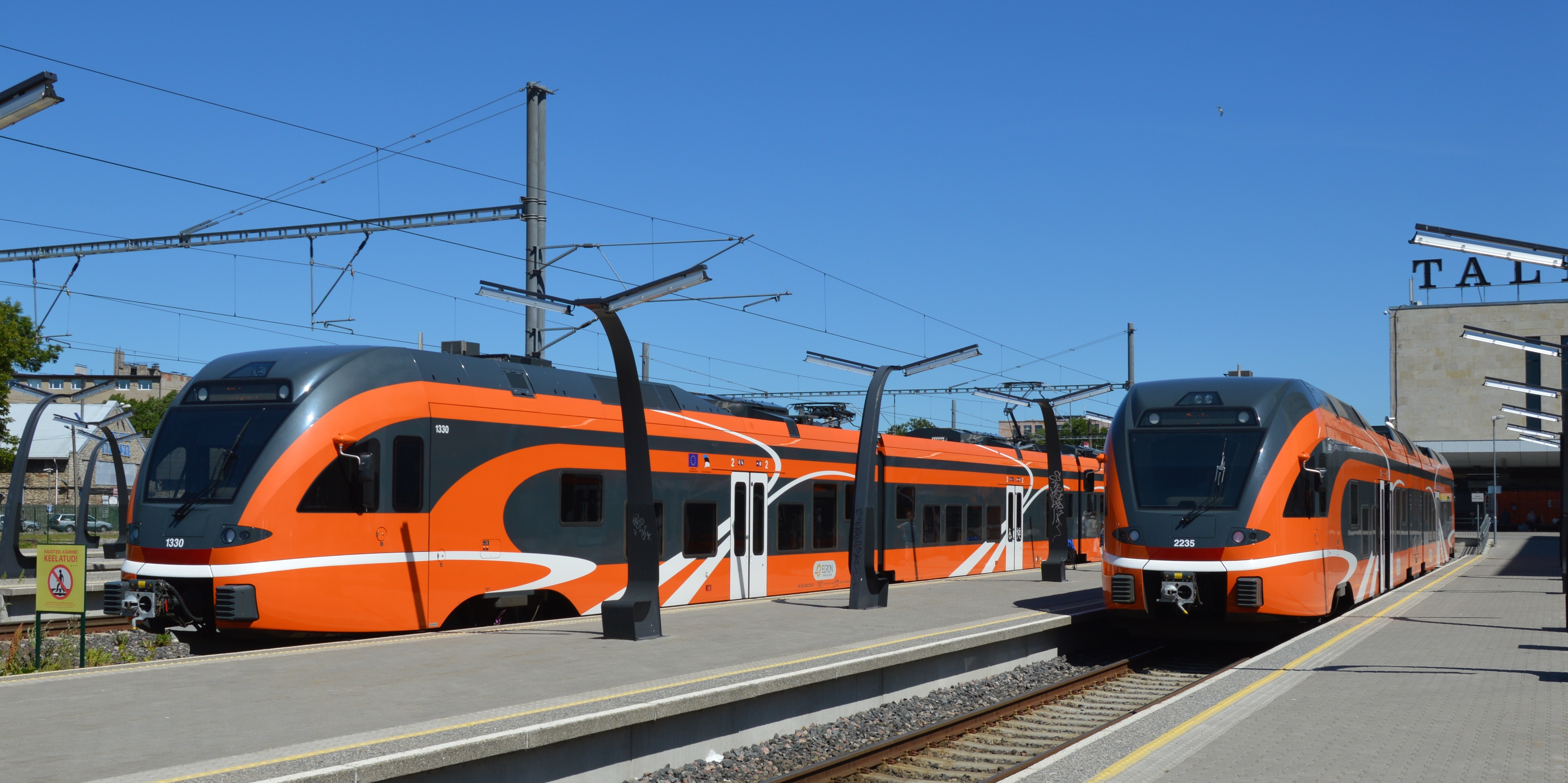

General information
- Location: Toompuiestee 37; Tallinn; Estonia
- Coordinates: 59°26′23.82″N 24°44′13.74″E
- Owner: AS GoProperty
- Operator: Elron
- Lines: Elron Tallinn-Tartu-Valga; Elron Tallinn-Tartu-Riga; Elron Tallinn-Tartu-Koidula; Elron Tallinn-Narva; Elron Tallinn-Viljandi; Elron Tallinn-Aegviidu/Tapa; Elron Tallinn-Turba/Paldiski
- Platforms: 9
- Tracks: 12
- Train operators: Elron
- Connections: Buses 2 3 8 41 59 66 91 92 93 94 95 96; Trolleybuses 84 85; Trams T1 T2 T5 T6; Regional Buses 102 104A 104B 104C 105 106 106A 106B 106C 114 115 120 120A 121 125 125A 130 131 132 132A 134 135 135A 135C 138 139 141 144 150 151 151A 152 152A 153 154 155 156 157 157A 158 159 160 163 173 174; Commercial Buses 200 277

Construction
- Structure type: at-grade
- Parking: No; spaces for stopping and loading
- Cycle facilities: Outdoor bicycle parking next to the station and under the station in a tunnel
- Accessible: Yes

Other information
- Fare zone: I
- Website: goproperty.ee/balti-jaam/

History
- Opened: 1870
- Rebuilt: 1960-1966
- Electrified: 1924; 3 kV DC OHLE

Services
Preceding station	Elron	Following station
Terminus	Tallinn–Tartu–Valga	Kitseküla towards Valga
Terminus	Tallinn–Tartu–Koidula	Kitseküla towards Koidula
Terminus	Tallinn–Narva	Kitseküla towards Narva
Terminus	Tallinn–Aegviidu	Kitseküla towards Aegviidu
Terminus	Tallinn–Viljandi	Tallinn-Väike towards Viljandi
Terminus	Tallinn–Turba/Paldiski	Lilleküla towards Turba, Kloogaranna or Paldiski
International service
Preceding station	LTG Link	Following station
Terminus	Vilnius—Riga—Tallinn	Valga towards Vilnius
Tram services
Preceding station	Trams in Tallinn	Following station
Põhja puiestee towards Kadriorg	1	Telliskivi towards Kopli
Põhja puiestee towards Suur-Paala	2	Telliskivi towards Kopli
Põhja puiestee towards Vana-Lõuna	5	Telliskivi towards Kopli
Location

Baltic Station (Estonian: Balti jaam) is the main railway station in Tallinn, Estonia, and the largest railway station in Estonia. The majority of trains in Estonia start or terminate at this station.

Baltic Station is located in central Tallinn, and is situated immediately northwest of the city's Old town (Estonian: Tallinna vanalinn). It stands close to a large market called the Baltic Station Market (Balti Jaama Turg).

The first station opened in 1870 when a railway line connecting Saint Petersburg with Paldiski via Tallinn was opened. The station was completely reconstructed between 1960–1966, and in 2005, the station building was completely renewed.

== History ==
The first railway station in Tallinn was built at the end of the 1860s by the Baltic Railway Company as part of a 400 km (250 mi) long Saint Petersburg-Tallinn-Paldiski railway line. The first main building was completed in 1870. It was a two-storey building constructed from limestone with tower-like extrusions.

During the 1 December 1924 communist coup d'état attempt in Estonia, Karl Kark, the then Minister of Transportation was assassinated by gunshot by pro-Soviet insurgents at the Tallinn Baltic Station.

During World War II in 1941, the station building was set on fire by the Soviet Red Army. Shortly after the war, in 1945, the building was partially renovated. During 1960–1966, the station was completely reconstructed. Since the 1990s, the commuter trains 20x20m waiting pavilion has been used as a market. In 2005, the station building was completely renewed and Hotel Shnelli and the headquarters of Estonian Railways (Eesti Raudtee) were completed nearby.

== Layout ==
The station has nine platforms, of which three are situated apart from the rest and are mostly being used for Elron's long-distance services, with occasional commuter trains departing from them. Platforms closer to the station building are used by both commuter trains and long-distance trains.

== Gallery ==
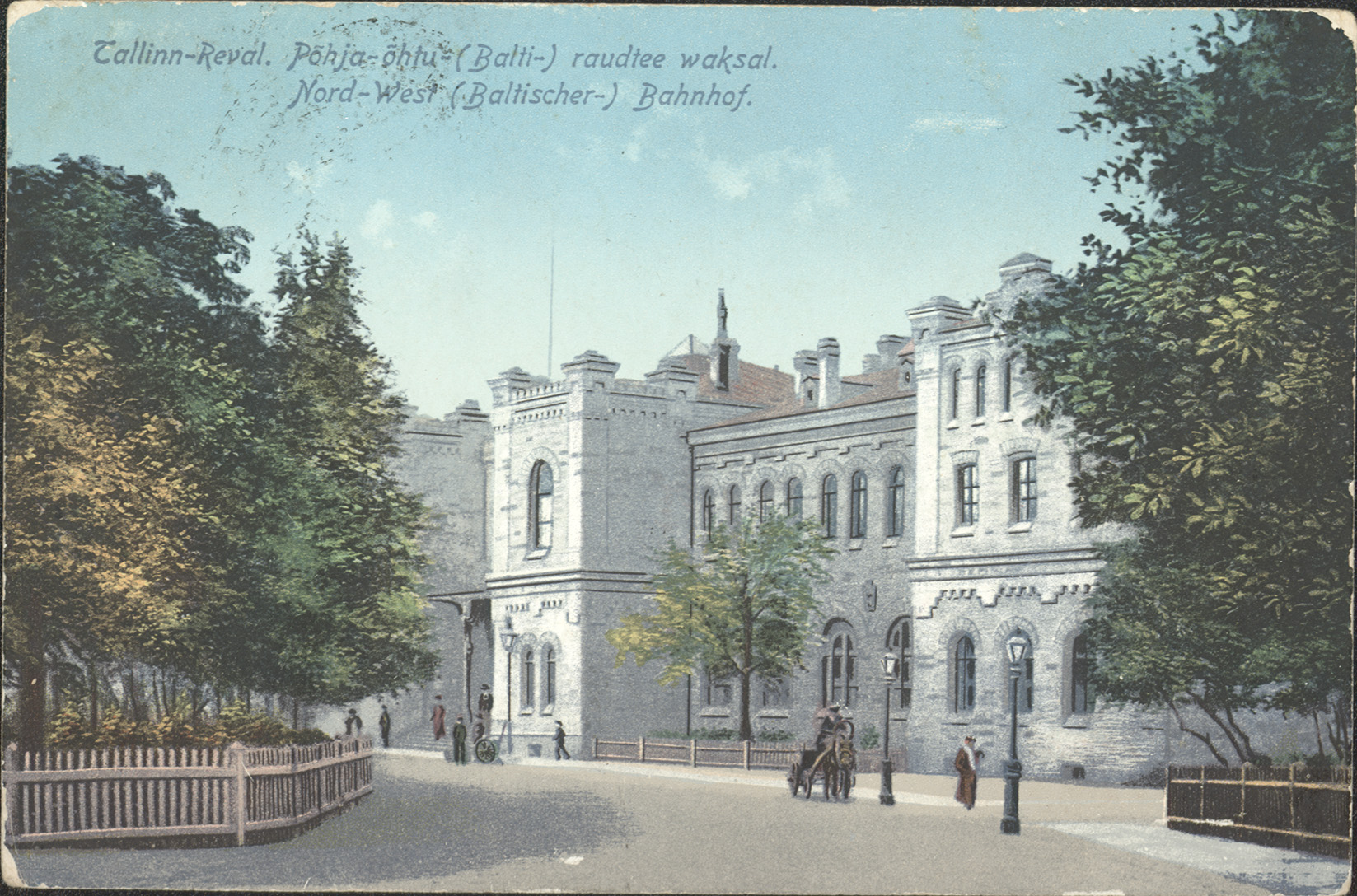
Old station (1910)

Exterior

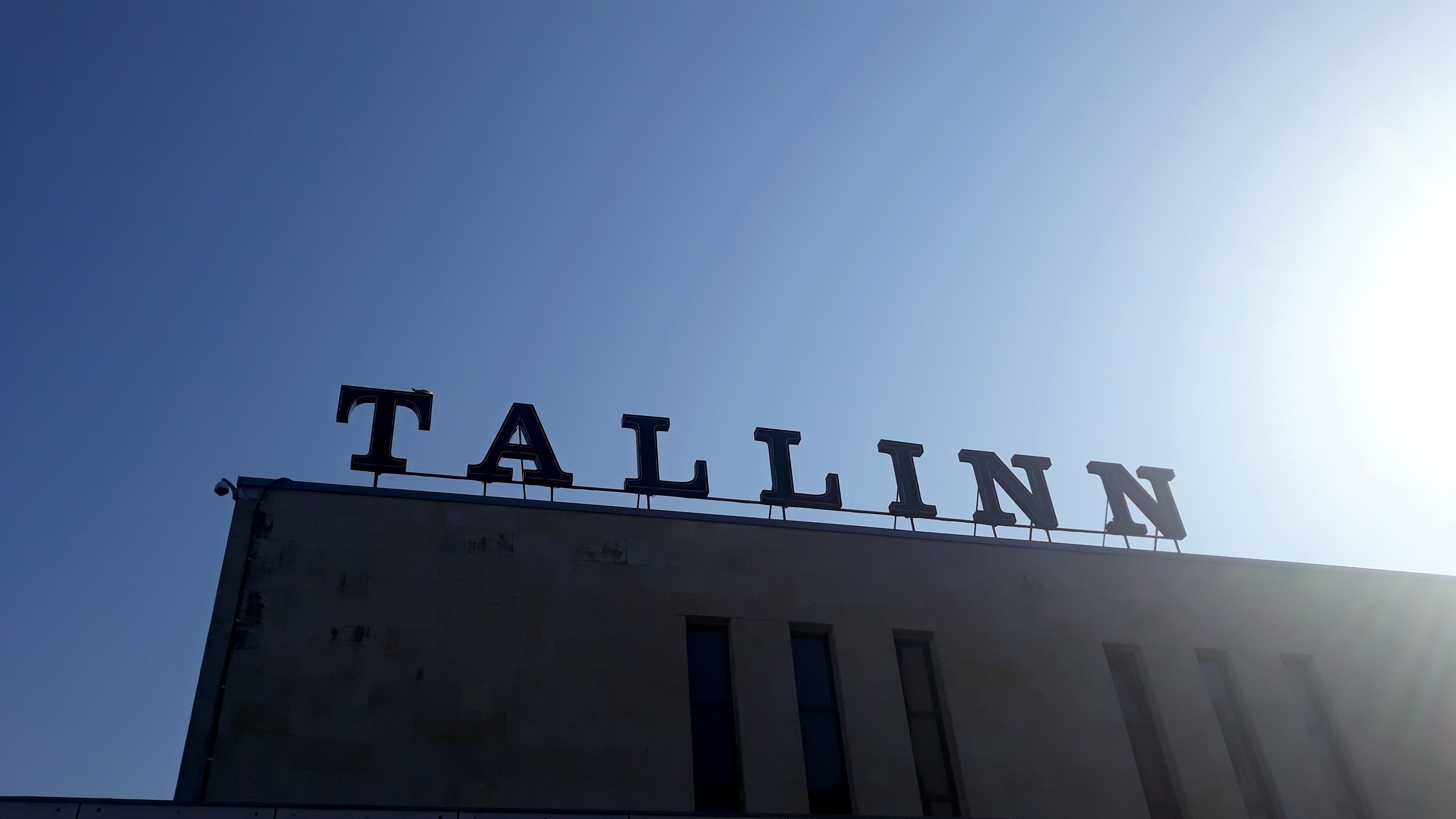
Exterior

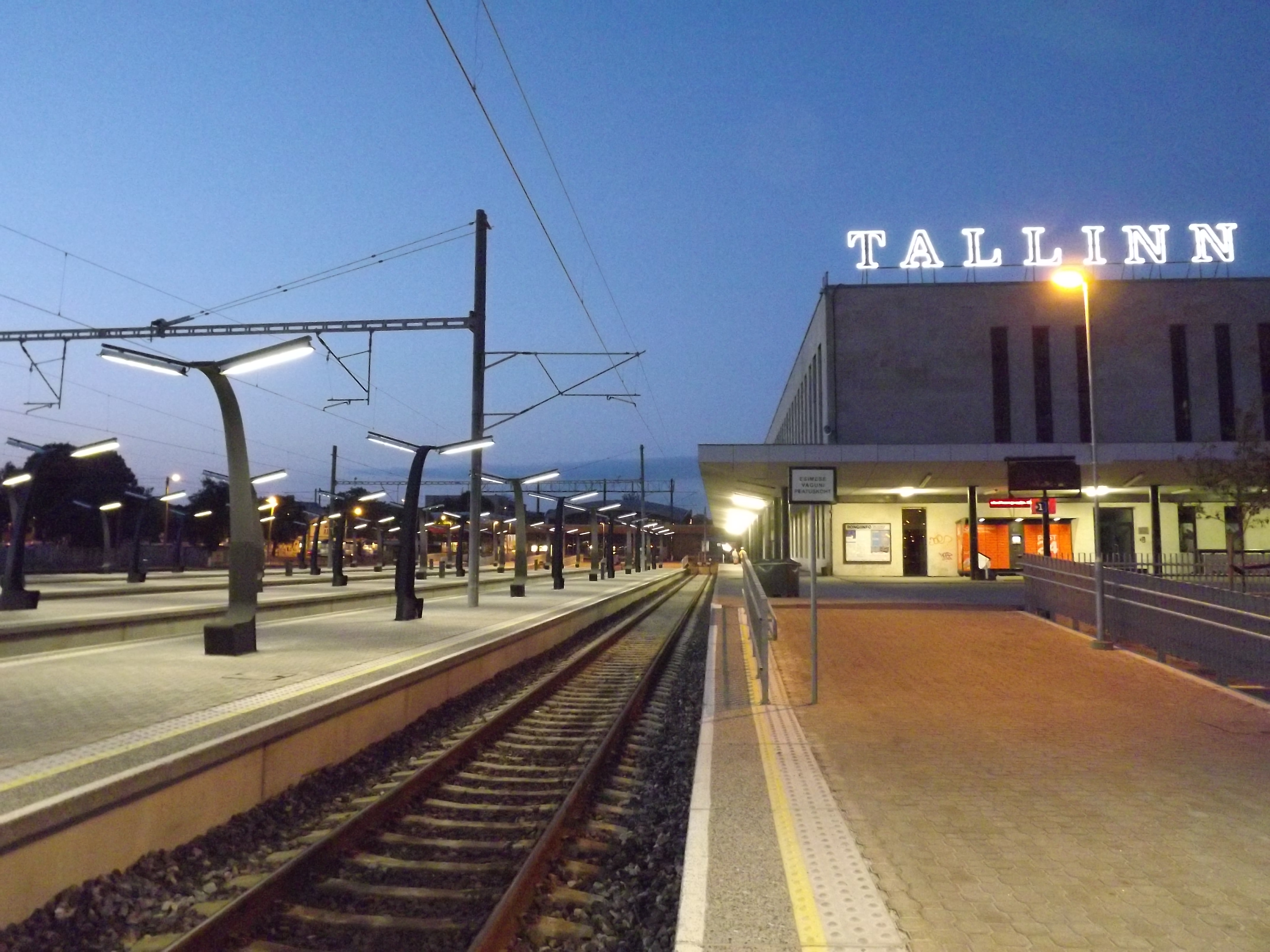
Platforms

Platforms

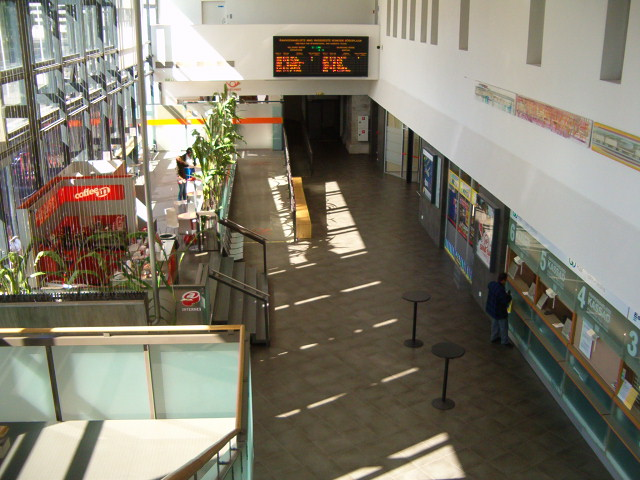
Interior (2009)

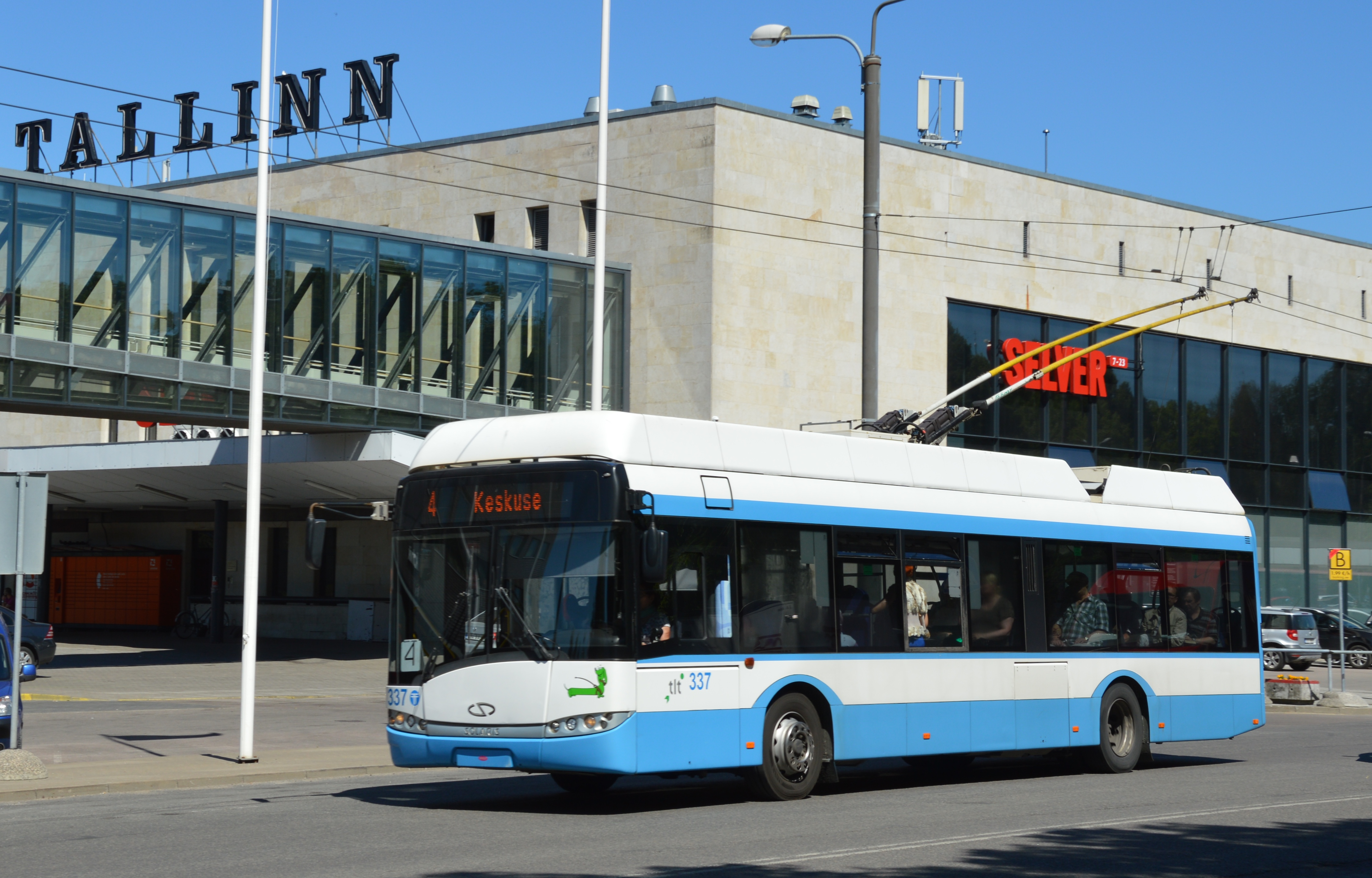
Trolleybus (2015)

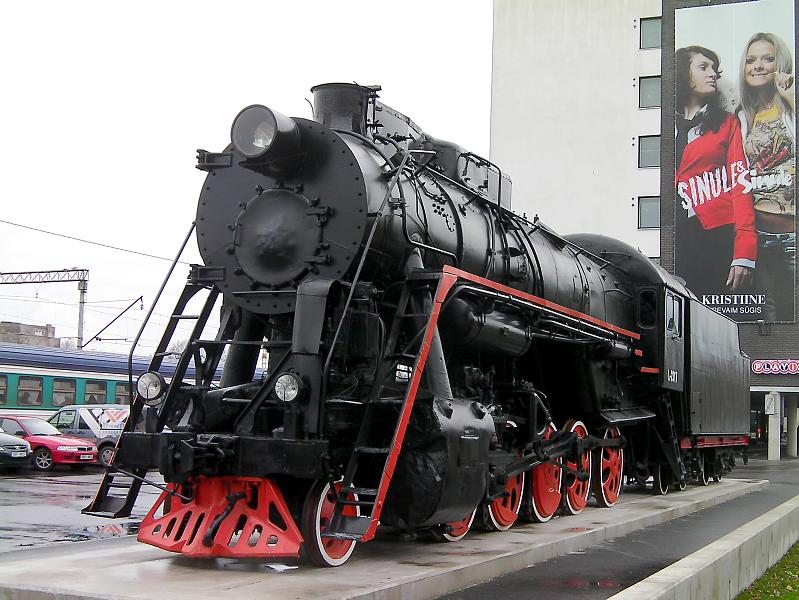
Locomotive L-2317

== See also ==
- List of railway stations in Estonia
- Rail transport in Estonia
- Public transport in Tallinn
- Ülemiste railway station
