= Sõjamäe =

Subdistrict of Tallinn, Estonia

Coordinates: 59.421581°N 24.841526°E

- Subdistrict of Tallinn
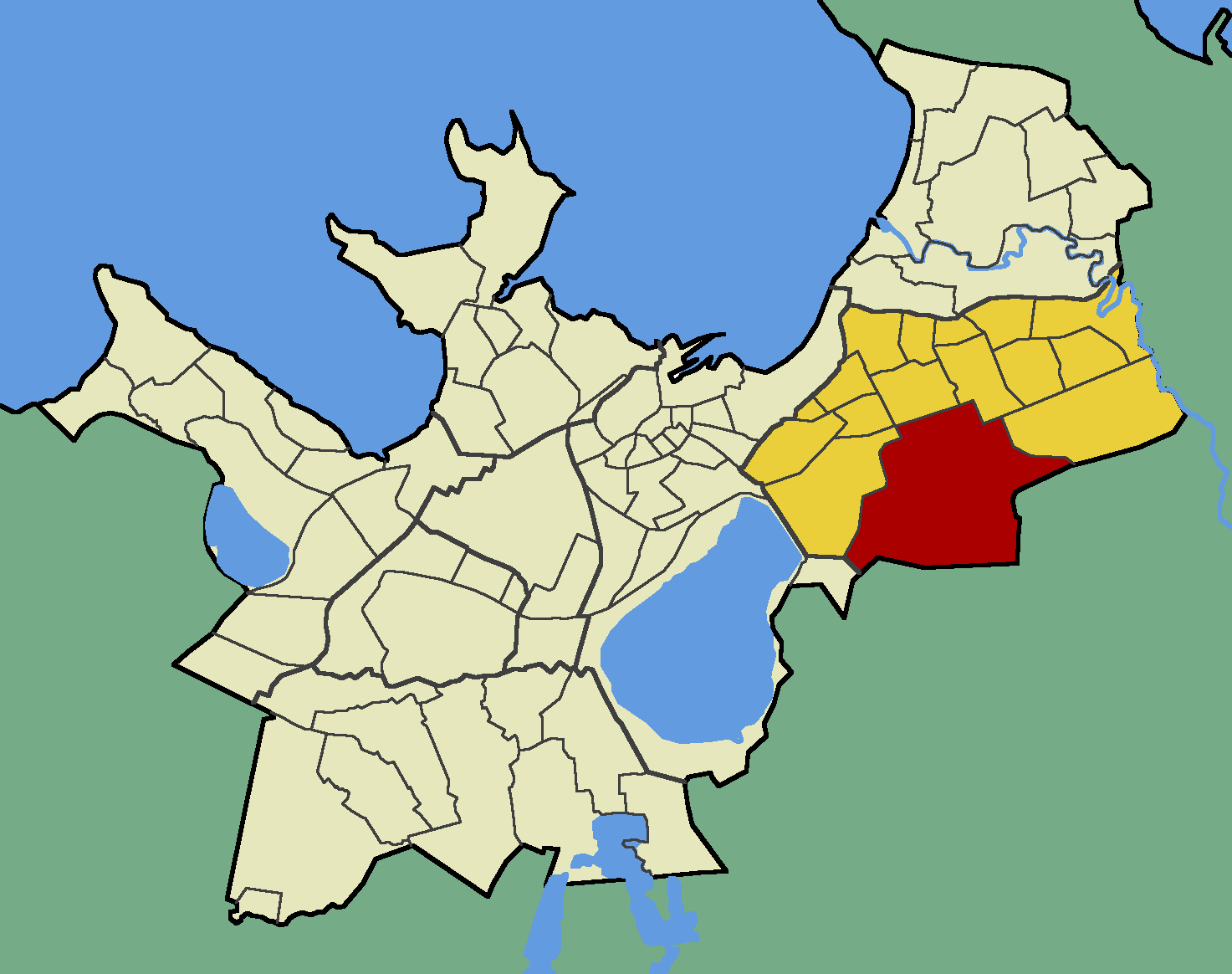
- Sõjamäe within Lasnamäe District.
- Country: Estonia
- County: Harju County
- City: Tallinn
- District: Lasnamäe

Population (01.01.2014)
  - Total: 140

Sõjamäe (Estonian for "War Hill") is a subdistrict (Estonian: asum) in the district of Lasnamäe, Tallinn, the capital of Estonia. It has a population of 140 (As of 1 January 2014).

Sõjamäe has a bus station named "Vesse".

== Gallery ==
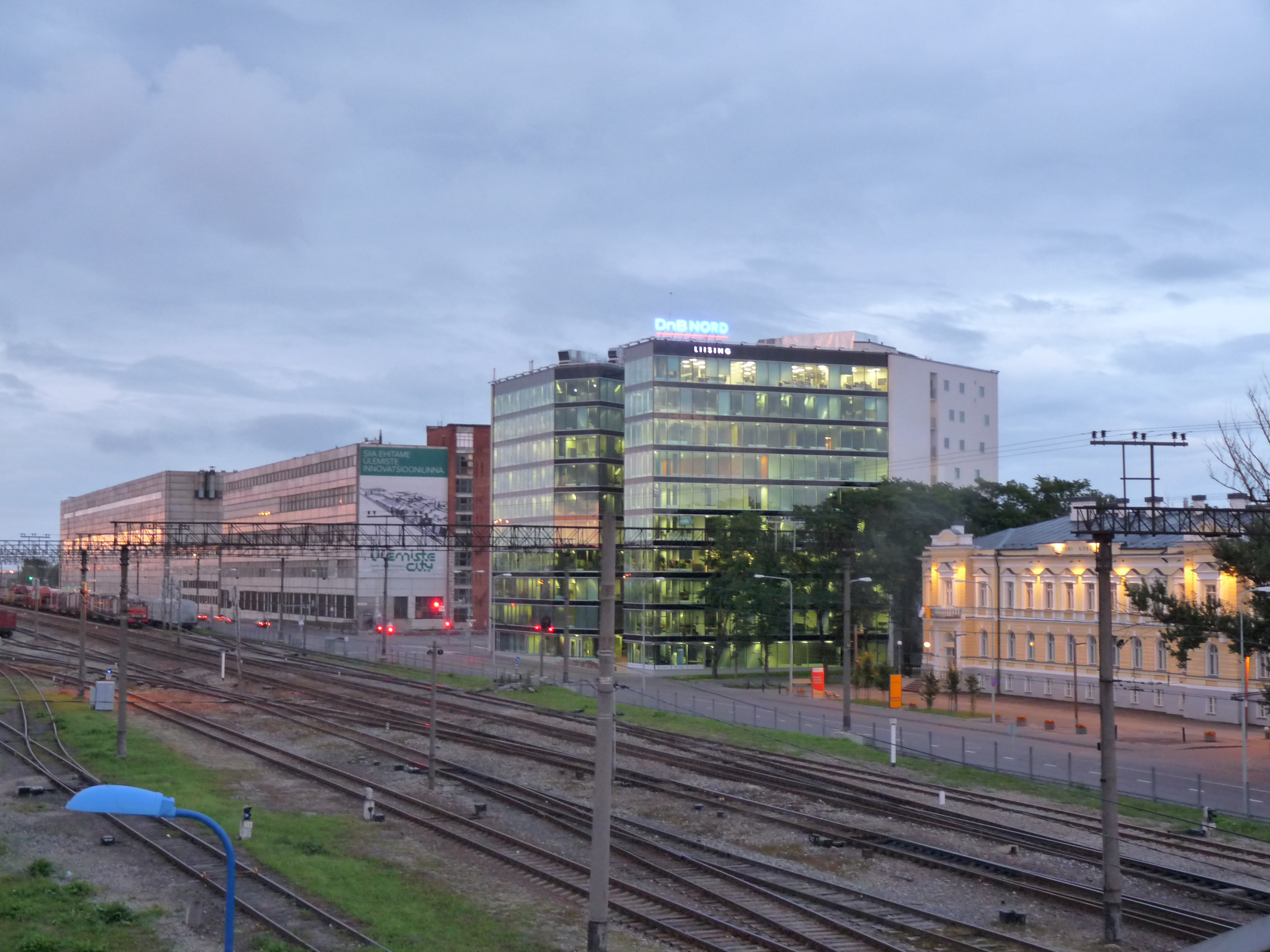

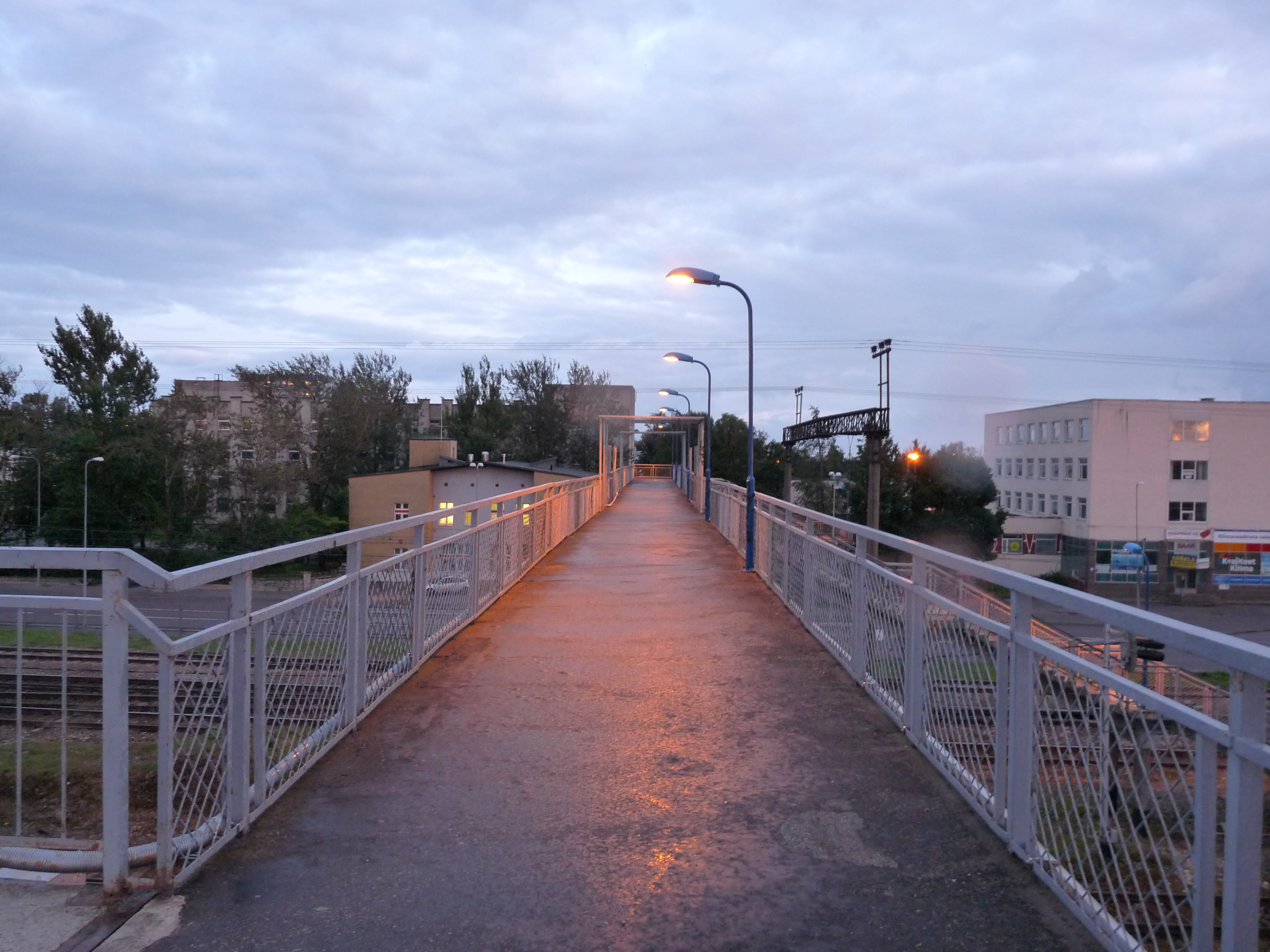

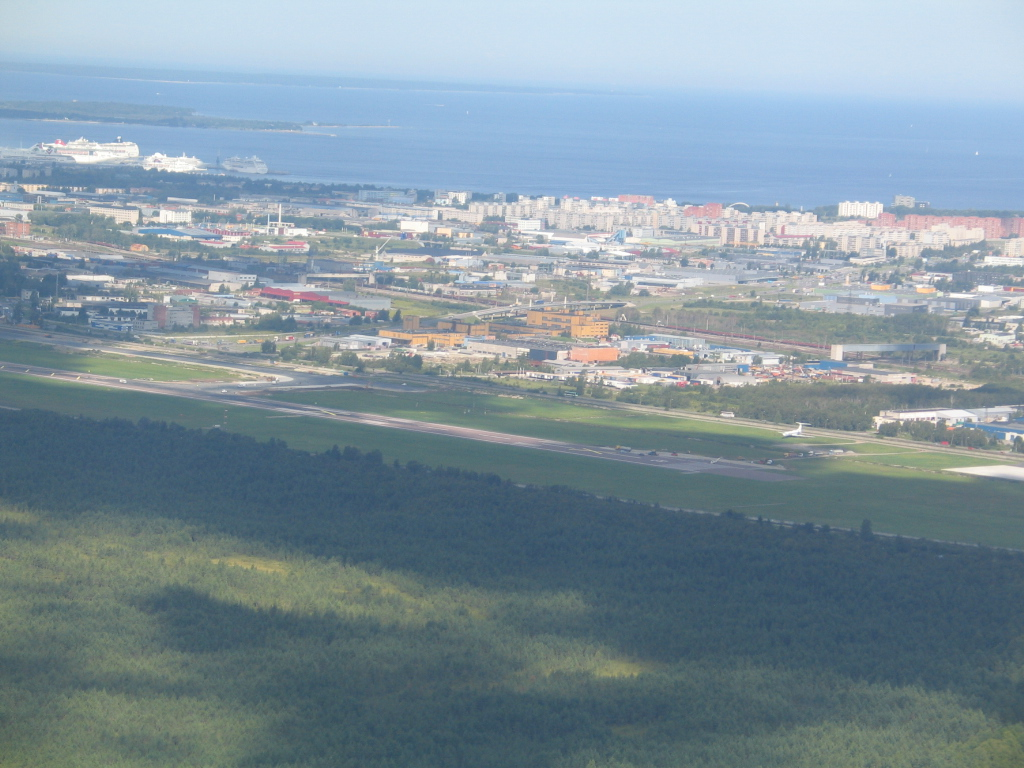

== See also ==
- Tallinn Airport
- Ülemiste City
