= Baltic Railway Company =

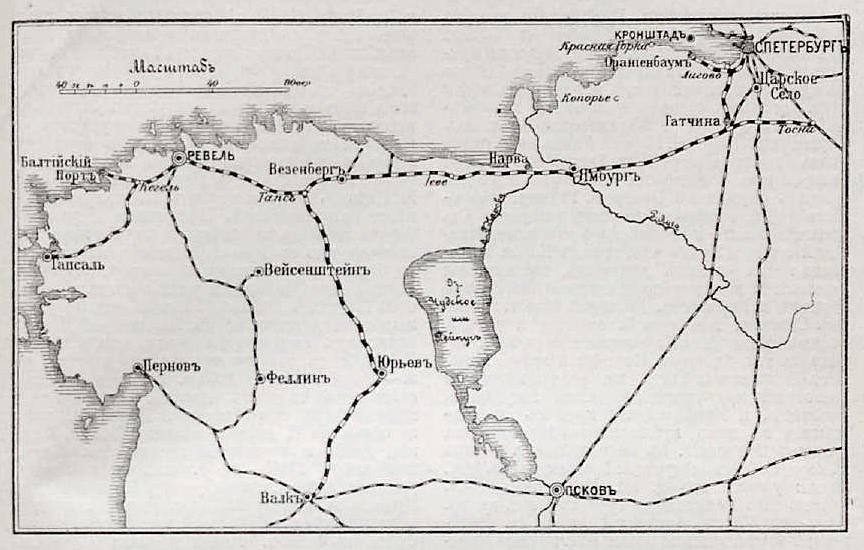
- Railway lines of the Baltic Railway Company in 1911

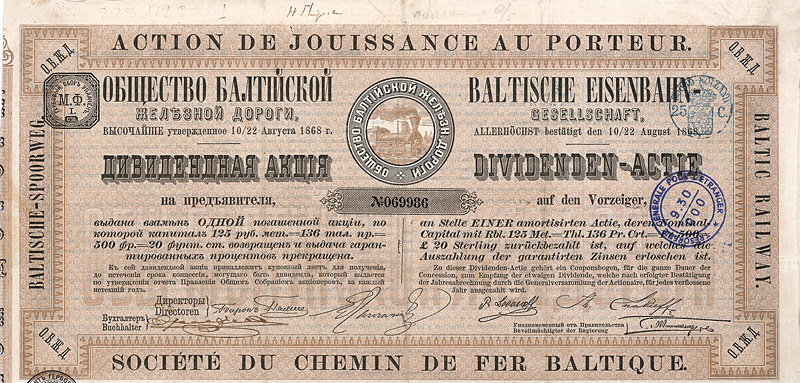
- A share certificate of 125 rubles of the Baltic Railway Company from 1875
- Native name: Baltische Eisenbahn-Gesellschaft (German); Общество балтийской желъзной дороги (Russian)
- Founded: 1868
- Defunct: 1907
- Successor: North-Western Railways

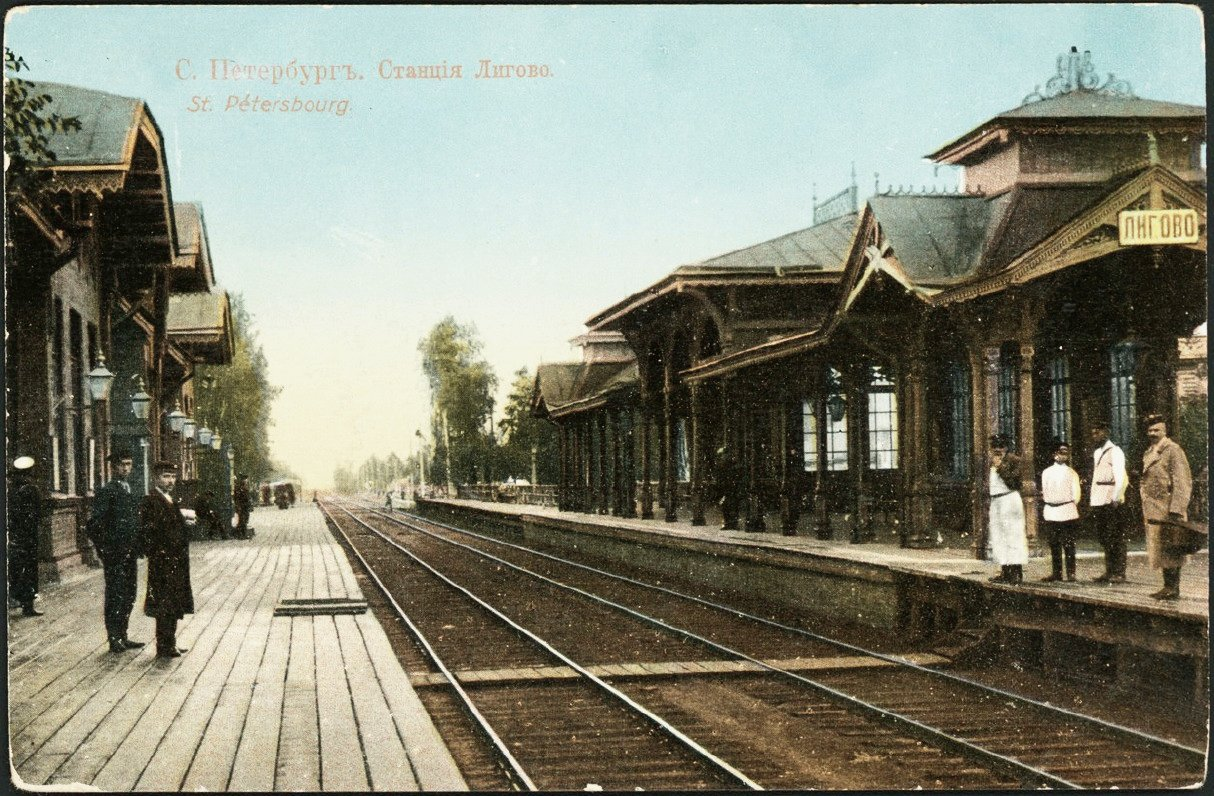
The Baltic Railway Company's Ligovo railway station near Saint Petersburg in the beginning of 20th century.

The Baltic Railway Company (German: Baltische Eisenbahn-Gesellschaft; Russian: Общество балтийской желъзной дороги) was an initially private and later state-owned railway company in the Russian Empire which existed from 1868 to 1907.

The railway company owned and operated a number of railway lines primarily in the Baltic governorates of the Russian Empire. The company's main line connected the Baltic ports of Reval (now Tallinn) and Baltischport (now Paldiski) with the Russian capital Saint Petersburg as well as the Saint Petersburg–Moscow railway. Today, the railway lines of the company are located in Estonia and Latvia, as well as in the Russian oblasts of Leningrad and Pskov.

== History ==
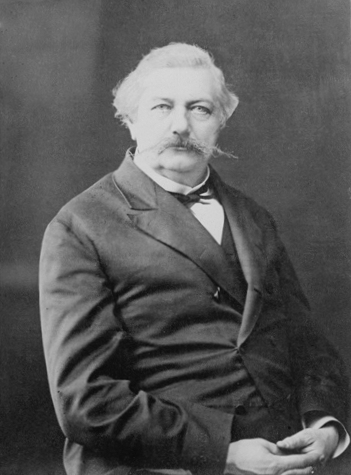
Baron Alexander von der Pahlen, the first president of the Baltic Railway Company.

The opening of the railway between Saint Petersburg and Pavlovsk in 1836, the first public railway in Russia, led to a growing interest in building new railways in the Russian Empire. The first plan to build a railway between Saint Petersburg and Estonia was already presented in 1845, but the construction could not be financed at that time.

On 23 November 1868, the Baltic Railway Society was officially founded in Saint Petersburg. The main shareholders were Baltic-German Estonian landowners and Reval merchants, and the head of the Estonian Knighthood, Baron Alexander von der Pahlen, was elected as its first president.

In 1893, the company was acquired by the Russian state and merged with the Pskov-Riga Railway. In 1907, the combined Baltic and Pskov–Riga Railways, became part of the North-Western Railways along with the Saint Petersburg–Warsaw Railway.

== See also ==
- History of rail transport in Estonia
- History of rail transport in Latvia
- History of rail transport in Russia

== Bibliography ==
- Helme, Mehis (2018). Eesti raudteede 100 aastat [100 years of Estonian railways] (in Estonian). POST FACTUM. ISBN 9789949603350.
- Westwood, J. N. (1964). A History of Russian Railways. London: Allen & Unwin. OCLC 612838.
