= ER1 =

ER1 may refer to:

- ER1 (hospital), prototype hospital envisioned for the Washington D.C. area
- ER1 electric trainset, manufactured by Rīgas Vagonbūves Rūpnīca from 1957 till 1962
- Stadler KISS, electric trainset manufactured from 2008, in Sweden called ER1
