= ER2 electric trainset =

Electric multiple unit

RVR ER2 РВЗ ЭР2
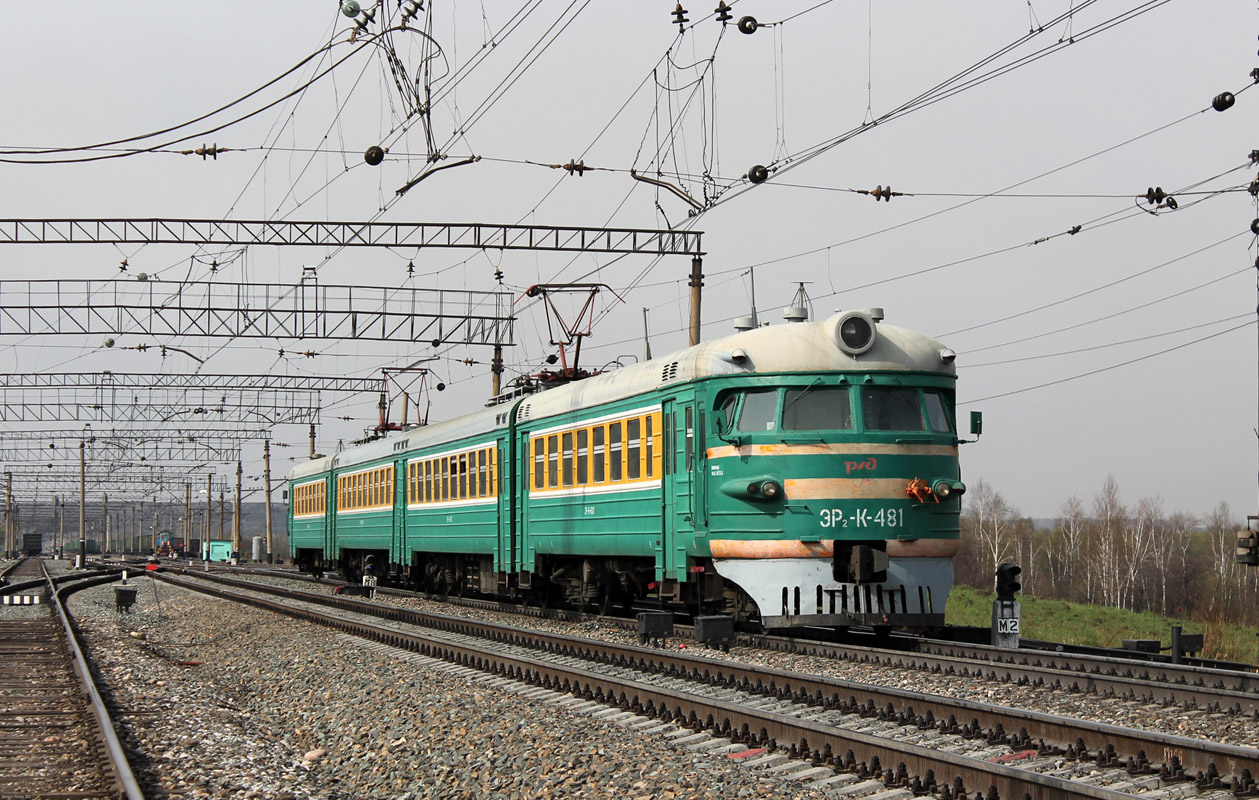
- Top: ER2K-481 at Bardino station in Kemerovo oblast, 8 May 2012. This set is in a 4-car formation with the aerodynamic cab ends as made up to 1974, with a variation of the old green livery. The set has been delivered in August 1964, but scrapped since, in 2019. Bottom: ER2K-1114 between Pavelevetskaya and Kolomenskoye stations in Moscow, 15 April 2017. This set is in a 10-car formation with boxy cab ends as made from 1974 onwards, with the new Russian Railways corporate livery. The set was delivered in February 1977, but it has been transferred to the Kaliningrad Railway since 2019.

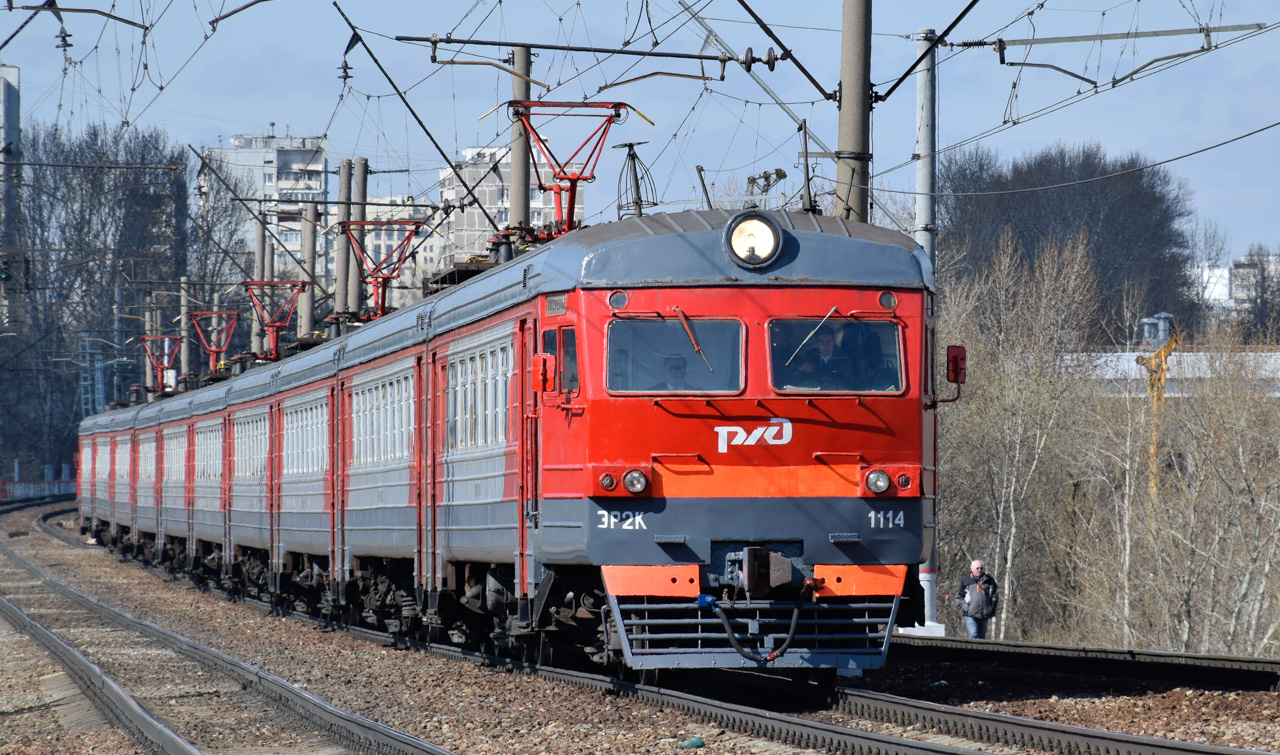
- Manufacturer: Rīgas Vagonbūves Rūpnīca
- Constructed: 1962-1984
- Number built: 850 (modifications not included)
- Formation: 4, 6, 8, 10, 12 cars

Specifications
- Car body construction: steel, aluminium
- Car length: 19.60 m (64 ft 4 in)
- Width: 3,480 mm (11 ft 5 in)
- Height: 5,086 mm (16 ft 8.2 in)
- Maximum speed: 100 km/h (62 mph) (from January 2008)
- Acceleration: 0.6 m/s^{2} (2.0 ft/s^{2})
- Deceleration: 0.8 m/s^{2} (2.6 ft/s^{2})
- Electric system: 3 kV DC Catenary
- Current collection: Pantograph
- Coupling system: SA3
- Track gauge: 1,520 mm (4 ft 11 27/32 in) Russian gauge

ER2 electric trainset is a DC electric multiple unit which was in production by the Railroad Machinery Plants of Riga (in consortium with the Electrical Machinery Plants of Riga and the Railroad Machinery Plants of Kalinin) from June 1962 to mid-1984. It was essentially an improvement of the ER1 design, featuring footboards for low platforms, and aprons for high platforms, as well as improved electrical equipment and minor changes to the bodywork (specifically, the engineer's cab, side walls, headstocks, and door mountings). Since the mid-1960s, the ER2 has been the most widely used type of suburban train in the Soviet Union and its successor states.

== Previous Soviet electric multiple units ==
Electric multiple units were first used in the Soviet Union in 1926 on the Baku-Sabuncu segment of the Baku mainline. These consisted of 2-car or 3-car sections, each of which had 1 power car and 1 or 2 trailer cars (a similar consist to that still used today). The motor cars used 1200 V DC current and had 4 75-kW motors for a total power output of 300 kW. These trainsets were retired in the 1940s.

In August 1929, a second electrified suburban line was opened, from Moscow to the northern suburb of Mytischi. This line operated the S-series electric multiple units (S standing for "Severnye Zheleznye Dorogi", or "Northern Railroad"). These consisted of standard 3-car sections, each section having 1 power car and 2 trailers. The power cars used 1500 V DC current and had a total power of 600 kW (up to 720 kW on later versions). The electrical equipment for these trains was manufactured by Metropolitan Vickers (later license-built by the Dynamo factory in Moscow), and the mechanical equipment was made by the Mytischi Railroad Machinery Plant. After World War II, the entire production was transferred to the Riga Railroad Machinery Plant, which continued producing these trainsets until 1958. The many versions of the S-series trains produced included 1500-V and 3000-V versions, dual-current versions and some versions fitted with dynamic brakes. All of these had one common design flaw: the traction motors were mounted directly on the axles to simplify manufacture, which in turn limited maximum speed to 85 km/h.

In 1954, the Riga Railroad Machinery Plant built several prototype 3-car electric multiple units designated SN ("Severnaya Novaya", or "Northern New"). These had their traction motors mounted on the truck frames, which allowed them to reach speeds of up to 130 km/h. The traction motors had a 1-hour rating of 200 kW. At that time, commuter railroads were expanding and widespread electrification was being implemented; the resulting increase in commuter traffic required much higher average speeds between stations. This, in turn, required greatly increased acceleration, which the underpowered S and SN multiple units could not provide. With this in mind, in 1957 the Riga Railroad Machinery Plant and the Dynamo Plant made a drastic redesign of the SN multiple units, producing 5 service prototypes of what would ultimately be known as the ER1 trainset. These were 10-car trains consisting of 5 2-car sections (each comprising 1 power car and 1 trailer), which were permanently coupled together. This greatly improved the power-to-weight ratio (hence improving acceleration) and simplified production; the disadvantage was that train length could no longer be adjusted for traffic conditions. These trains also had automatic sliding doors (as opposed to the manually operated doors on the S-series trains), lightweight car bodies (10% lighter than the S units), and coil-spring rather than leaf-spring suspension. They were used extensively on the suburban lines out of Moscow and St. Petersburg, where they significantly reduced travel times; however, their biggest shortcoming was that their entrance/exit doors were only designed to be compatible with high platforms, which precluded their use on other lines (most of which had stations with low platforms).

== Development and production history ==
As stated in the previous section, there were many busy suburban railroads in the Soviet Union which required a faster and more powerful replacement for the obsolete S units, but also one which was compatible with the low passenger platforms used on these lines (which the ER1 could not accommodate). Accordingly, it was decided to update the ER1 trainsets with exits which were compatible with both high and low platforms; the updated design was to be known as the ER2. The new exits required changes to the underframe, which could have had deleterious consequences for the cars' structural integrity; to avoid this, the cars' side walls, headstocks, door frames, and head-end bulkheads (on cars with engineers' cabs) had to be reinforced. Also, to maximize commonality of parts with the ER9 AC electric trainsets (which were to be produced concurrently with the ER2 on the same assembly lines), the brakes were redesigned—instead of 1 master cylinder actuating all of a given car's brake shoes, 4 brake cylinders were installed (2 per truck). The designers also took the opportunity to improve the electrical equipment: lead-acid storage batteries were replaced with safer alkaline storage batteries, and the motor-generator windings were redesigned. (Both of these improvements were already tested on selected ER1 trainsets.) The new trainset was given the factory designation 62–61.

In 1962, the Riga and Kalinin Railroad Machinery Plants finished the production run of the ER1 and immediately switched over to production of the ER2, producing 48 of them straight off the drawing board by the end of the year. As with the ER1, the ER2s were produced by a consortium of several different factories: the Riga Electric Machinery Plant manufactured the traction motors and other electrical equipment, the Kalinin Railroad Machinery plant built the car bodies and trucks for the trailer cars (including the driving trailers), and the Riga Railroad Machinery Plant built the car bodies and trucks for the power cars and performed the final assembly. From 1968 onward all car body manufacturing was transferred to the Riga Railroad Machinery Plant, the Kalinin plant only producing the trucks for the trailer cars.

In 1974, the engineer's cab was redesigned, its shape changing from round to rectangular. (This was done to increase commonality with later ER22 trainsets.)

The total production run for the ER2 numbered 850 complete trainsets; of these, 629 were built with 10 cars each, 134 with 12 cars, 75 with 8 cars, 7 with 6 cars and 5 with 4 cars each. Unlike the ER1, the cars in the ER2 trainsets were not permanently coupled, which allowed their length to be adjusted according to traffic levels. To facilitate this, from 1964 to 1970 and from 1981 to 1984 the Kalinin and Riga plants produced 133 separate driving trailers (to allow the splitting of trainsets into shorter sections); in 1967–68, the Riga plant produced 52 separate power cars to go with the driving trailers; from 1967 onward, 173 intermediate 2-car sections were produced (to lengthen trainsets as needed); from 1973 onward, 58 head-end 2-car sections (with an engineer's cab) were produced; and in 1980, 4 intermediate trailers were built. Production of the ER2 trainsets was ended in September 1984, the Riga Railroad Machinery Plant switching to production of the improved ER2R and ER2T trainsets (basically ER2s, but fitted with rheostatic braking).

== Design ==
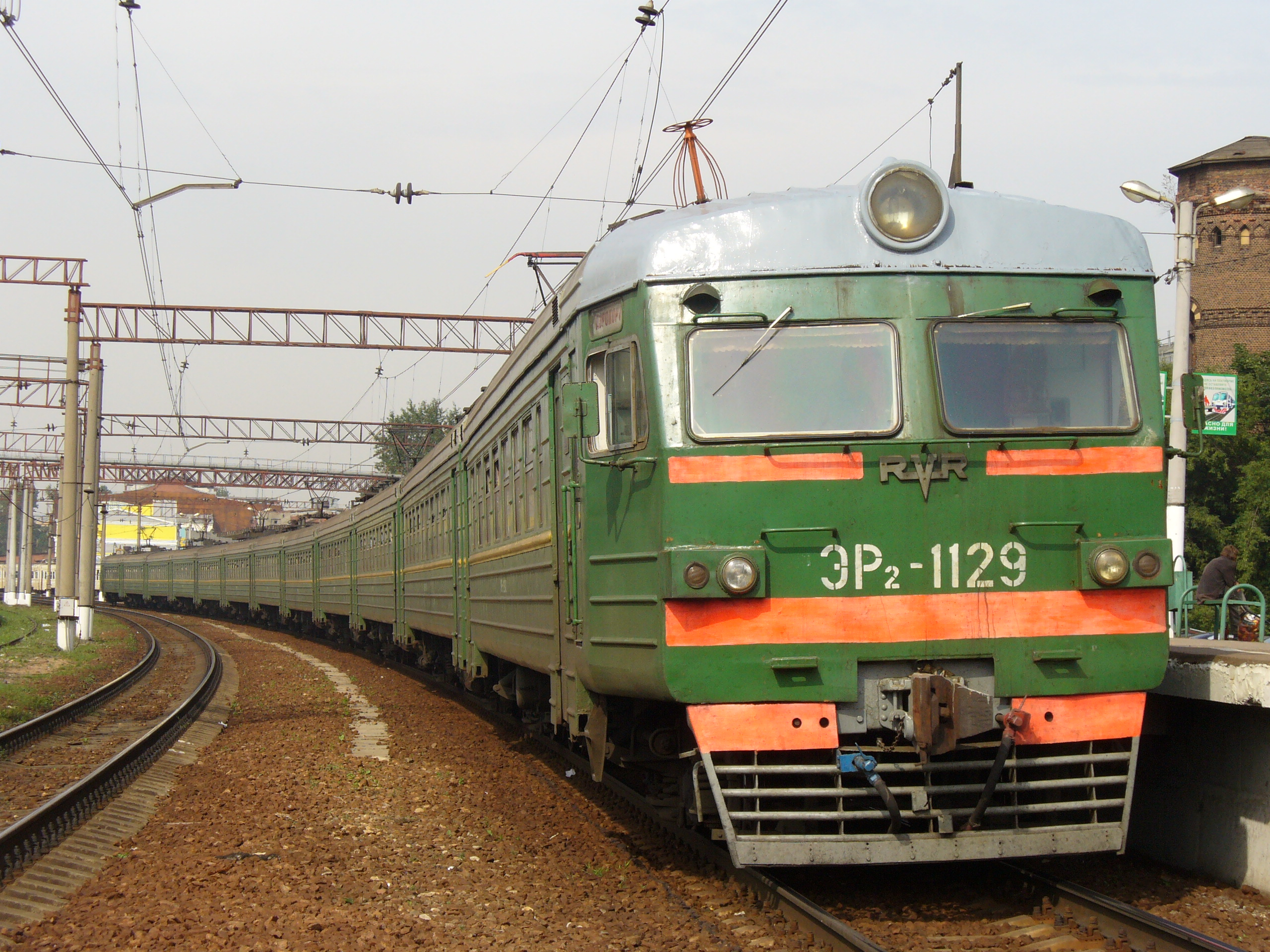
ER2-1129 on Paveletskoe line in Moscow (2006)

The ER2 is mostly similar to the earlier ER1; the most significant design changes were made to the passenger doors (which were now compatible with both high and low passenger platforms, unlike those of the ER1 which were only compatible with high platforms) and the electrical equipment (improved storage batteries and motor-generators). Also, braking equipment was redesigned: the number of braking cylinders was increased, the connecting levers simplified, and automatic adjusters which adjusted the travel of the brake piston rods were deleted.

=== General specifications ===
The ER2 trainset consists of 2-car sections, each of which includes a power car and a trailer (either a driving trailer with an engineer's cab on one end, or an intermediate trailer without an engineer's cab). Sections with a driving trailer are called head sections; those with an intermediate trailer are called intermediate sections. The sections cannot operate independently; the minimum train length is 2 head sections, and the maximum is 6 sections (2 head sections and 4 intermediate sections), with a train 5 sections long (2 head and 3 intermediate) considered standard. Coupling more than 6 sections is unsafe due to overloading of motor-generators which power the engineer's controls. The cars are coupled together with the SA3 coupler, which is standard on Soviet rolling stock and allows vertical movement of up to 100 mm.

To maximize passenger accommodation, almost all electrical equipment is mounted either on the roof (pantograph) or under the car floors (starting resistors, compressors, etc.) All underfloor equipment is enclosed in cabinets with removable spring-latched access panels to protect it from blowing dust and snow. Some of the auxiliary equipment (including some high-voltage equipment such as the electric meter) is placed in cabinets inside car vestibules. Control equipment is concentrated in the engineer's cab. Numerous changes were made during the production run (see below), which caused variations in equipment layout.

Specifications (for a standard 10-car train): Overall length: 201.81 m Empty weight: 470-484 t Number of seats: up to 1050 Traction motor 1-hour rating: 4000 kW Tractive effort: up to 26,350 kilograms-force Maximum speed: 130 km/h (130 km/h (81 mph)) Acceleration up to 60 km/h (37 mph): 0.6-0.7 m/s^{2} (0.6–0.7 m/s^{2} (2.0–2.3 ft/s^{2}))

=== Interior layout ===
Most of the cars' interior space is taken up by the passenger salon. The majority of the floor space is occupied by bench seats, above which are mounted luggage shelves and coat hooks. The bench seats usually seat 6 passengers (3 facing front, 3 facing rear) and are placed on either side of a central aisle. The total number of seats was often varied during the production run; also, during overhauls some of the seats were often removed to increase the amount of standing room and thereby the total passenger capacity. Intermediate trailer and power cars typically have 107-110 seats, and driving trailers 77-88 seats; a 10-car train has up to 1050 seats in all and a total passenger capacity of up to 1600 people. The passenger salon is separated by sliding double doors from vestibules on either end of the car, which have pneumatically operated sliding double doors for entry and exit of passengers.

Lighting is provided by ceiling lamps with incandescent bulbs (nowadays usually replaced by fluorescent lighting or LEDs); the passenger salons of intermediate trailers and power cars normally have 20 ceiling lamps, those of driving trailers 16, and vestibules 2 each. These lamps are powered by the motor-generators (see below), so if this fails, all lights in the 2-car section go out; to prevent the section from being completely darkened, some of the ceiling lamps include an emergency light which consists of a low-powered incandescent bulb next to the main light, and draws its power from the storage battery.

Ventilation is accomplished partly by opening the windows, and partly by a forced-air system served by 2 twin centrifugal fans. The fans are mounted above the ceiling of each vestibule and force fresh air into a ventilation duct which runs above the ceiling along the car centerline and feeds the air into the passenger salon via a series of small vents. In the summer the air is taken in through outside air intakes and passed through screen filters; in the winter the air is partially recirculated. Heating is provided by electric heating under the bench seats (intermediate trailers and power cars usually have 20 furnaces, driving trailers 14). Each furnace uses 1 kW of power; the voltage feed is 750 V (from the traction power supply), so the furnaces are mounted in electrically grounded outer casings for safety (2 furnaces in each casing). Each heating circuit has 5 furnaces connected in series and fed directly with 3000 V current from the traction circuits.

=== Car bodies ===
As on the ER1, the ER2 car bodies are of a welded all-metal semi-monocoque load-bearing design (the entire car body bears all structural loads). The framework is built up from bent and extruded steel profiles, and consists of ring frames which are covered with corrugated sheet steel 1.5-2.5 mm thick. The automatic couplers and their shock absorbers are mounted on short spine beams at each end of the car. The doors and wire conduits are made of aluminum, which helped to keep the weight down and resulted in the cars being only slightly heavier than those of the ER1. Footboards are fitted under the outside of each door for boarding and alighting to/from low platforms; when boarding/alighting passengers to/from high platforms, these are covered by metal aprons (gap fillers). The end bulkheads of each car (except for the head end of the driving trailer, which is occupied by the engineer's cab) incorporate swing-down transfer platforms which allow passengers to walk between cars; these also damp the cars' pitching motion when the train is moving. The cars are 19.600 m (64 ft 3.7 in) long and 3,480 mm (11 ft 5 in) wide. The power cars weigh 54.6 tonnes (53.7 long tons; 60.2 short tons), the driving trailers 40.9 tonnes (40.3 long tons; 45.1 short tons), and the intermediate trailers 38.3 tonnes (37.7 long tons; 42.2 short tons).

=== Mechanical equipment ===
==== Trucks ====
Each car is mounted on the bolsters of 2 double-sprung 2-axle trucks; the trucks of the power and trailer cars have significant differences. The power car trucks have axlebox guides which prevent any lateral or longitudinal movement of the axles relative to the truck frame. The truck frame's longitudinal beams are reinforced in the middle to take the car's weight via the bolster and suspension springs. The transverse beams have a complex shape to accommodate the traction motors (which are mounted entirely on the truck frame). The truck frame rests on the axleboxes via the axlebox suspension, which consists of 4 coil springs per axlebox (2 on each end of each axle). In turn, the truck frame bears the weight of the bolster via the double central suspension; the bolster bears the weight of the car directly. The truck frame is additionally reinforced at the attachment points for the suspension swing links. On early trains, the central suspension incorporated elliptical leaf springs, but from 1965 onward they were replaced with coil springs, which increased the maximum suspension travel from 95 to 120 mm (which reduced the risk of bottoming). Both stages of the suspension incorporate shock absorbers: the axlebox suspension has 2 friction shock absorbers per axle, and the central suspension has 5 hydraulic shock absorbers (on trucks with coil springs only). The car body rests on skid pads on the cast side flanges of the bolster; these skid pads are made of layered plastic, and serve to reduce the rolling and yawing movements of the trucks and car bodies. The car body is also connected to the center of the bolster by means of the central pivot—a vertical steel rod mounted in the center of the bolster, which transmits the traction and braking forces from the truck to the car body, and also receives part of the car body's weight.

On the trailer cars, the trucks are similar to those of ordinary passenger cars, but have shorter frames. They lack axlebox guides (the longitudinal movements of the axles relative to the truck frame are limited solely by the suspension springs themselves), the springs are softer, the central pivot is made of 3 segments (which gives it a degree of flexibility), and the axlebox suspension friction shock absorbers are mounted inside the springs (on the power car trucks, they are mounted outside). The leading truck of the driving trailer has brackets for mounting the cab signal receiver coils. The early ER2 trailer cars had KVZ-5/E type trucks (identical to those on the ER1); later examples had the KVZ-TsNII/E type. The latter had the following design changes: the springs were softer; the bolster was attached to the frame by means of 2 swing links with rubber/metallic elements; the weight of the car body was borne by the bolster only via the skid pads (on the earlier type, part of the weight was also borne by the central pivot).

==== Wheel drive ====
The powered axles of the ER2 trainset are individually driven: each axle is powered by its own traction motor, which is connected to the axle by a pair of spur gears with a torque ratio of 3.17 (73:23) in a fully enclosed gearbox. The large gear with a transmission modulus of 10 is mounted directly on the axle, whereas the small gear is on a shaft which is mounted on 2 ball bearings (on early trains) or roller bearings (on later trains). The gearbox casing is mounted on the axle by means of a sealed roller bearing, and is also attached to the truck frame via a special suspension. Initially this suspension comprised a sickle-shaped link with 2 rubber and metal shock absorbers, but beginning in 1969 this was replaced by a vertical rod with 4 such shock absorbers (as on the ER22). During motion of the train, the frame-suspended motors constantly move relative to the axles, which requires some kind of flexible drive to accommodate this motion. On early ER2s this was achieved by means of a jaw coupling between the motor shaft and the intermediate drive shaft, but on later trains, rubber rag joints were used instead. The first such joint was fitted to an ER2 in 1964 as an experiment; in late 1965, five more prototypes with rubber couplings were built, and from 1966 onward these became standard on all new ER2s.

==== Wheels ====
On power cars, spoked wheels with separate steel tires are used; the tires have an outer diameter of 105 cm (1,050 mm (41.34 in)) and a thickness of 75 mm. The tires are shrunk onto the wheels, which are in turn shrunk onto the axle. One of the wheels on each axle has an elongated hub, which is attached with bolts to the large spur gear. The wheels of the trailer cars are smaller in size (only 95 cm in diameter), solid, have shorter hubs and a thinner axle.

=== Electrical equipment ===
The electrical equipment on the ER2 multiple units is similar to that of the late-model ER1s. Each power car has 4 traction motors connected in a series-parallel connection. The traction motor clamp voltage is controlled by means of starting resistances, as well as by changing the motors' connectivity and by field weakening. They are protected from electrical surges by various protective units: a fast-acting circuit breaker, an overload relay, a differential relay, etc. Early units also had a fuse in the traction motor circuit, but later units had more reliable protective equipment, which led to the fuse being removed as redundant.

==== Speed control ====
The engineer's controller has 18 starting notches, of which only 4 are classified as running notches (allowing prolonged operation of the motors in this notch). Acceleration is mainly controlled by means of resistances which are initially connected into the traction motor circuit and then incrementally notched out by means of shorting with special contactors. These contactors (19 in all) are grouped together in one drum controller. The ER2 uses an indirect control system: the engineer only has to place his (or her) controller handle in the desired notch, and the control system automatically notches out the drum controller to reach that notch. (The drum controller is pneumatically operated). For slow movement, as when shunting, the engineer places the controller in the first notch, designated M ("manevrovoe", i.e. "shunting"); this closes both line contactors, the bridge contactor, and contactors #7 and #8, connecting all 4 traction motors in series and engaging all of the starting resistances (total resistance 17.66 ohm). Moving the controller handle to the next notch (running notch #1) initiates an incremental notching-out (shorting-out) of the starting resistances; unlike most Russian electric locomotives, on which the engineer directly controls the selection of the starting notches, in the ER2 the intermediate starting notches are switched automatically by means of an accelerating relay which regulates the train's acceleration (by monitoring the traction current's change, see also: Traction motor#Automatic acceleration), although the engineer can override it and select the intermediate notches manually. In starting notch #9, all of the starting resistances are shorted out, and only the series-connected traction motors remain in the circuit, their fields at 100% strength. This corresponds to running notch #1 on the engineer's controller. Further notching out of the controller weakens the traction motors' field: in starting notch #10, the field strength is reduced to 67%, and in starting notch #11 to 50%. Starting notch #11 corresponds to running notch #2 on the engineer's controller.

To accelerate the train still further, the traction motors are reconnected in series-parallel connection (2 parallel circuits with 2 series-connected traction motors in each). For this purpose, in starting notch #12 the controller closes a pair of parallel contactors and opens the bridge contactor. After this the controller moves to starting notch #13, which closes contactors #1 and #2 and opens both field-weakening contactors; this assembles 2 parallel circuits, each of which comprises 2 traction motors and a group of starting resistances connected in series and has a total resistance of 4.97 ohm. Further notching out of the controller shorts out the starting resistances in pairs until in starting notch #16 all of the starting resistances are shorted out; this corresponds to running notch #3 on the engineer's controller. Moving the controller to starting notch #17 weakens the traction motor field to 67%, and in starting notch #18 the field is weakened to 50%. Starting notch #18 corresponds to running notch #4 on the engineer's controller; this is the maximum notch and allows the train to reach top speed. To coast, the engineer moves the controller handle to 0; this opens the line contactors, thereby shutting off all power to the traction motors, and moves the controller into starting notch #1 (therefore if the traction motors are turned on again, they are connected in series and all the starting resistances are in the circuit).

==== Traction motors ====
The traction motors are mounted on the truck frames (see above), which protects them from impact when rolling over rail joints and reduces the train's unsprung weight. The first ER2s had the same DK-106B traction motors as the ER1; these were DC series motors (the armature and field windings were connected in series, as is normal for variable-speed DC motors) with 4 main and 4 auxiliary poles and wavy armature windings. The motor's clamp voltage was 1500 V, and the insulation was designed for 3000 V (which gave a 2-fold safety margin). Unlike locomotive traction motors, these motors normally operated in weak field, with maximum field strength used only during acceleration. The motors are self-cooling (the cooling fan is fixed on the motor's output shaft); the cooling air is taken in through air intakes above the passenger doors.

In the 1960s, the Riga Electric Machinery Plant developed a new type of traction motor, the URT-110, which had similar performance to the DK-106B. These became standard on ER2 trainsets from March 1964.

==== High-voltage equipment ====
Electricity from the overhead contact wire is picked up by the train through pantographs mounted on the roofs of the power cars. These are pneumatically operated, so if the pressure in the air pipe falls below a preset level, they are automatically lowered by means of springs (this prevents the train from moving if air pressure is lost, an important safety feature). Each power car has only 1 pantograph, because if it fails the other power cars can produce sufficient power to move the train at a reduced speed. For the same reason, there is no provision for cutting out individual traction motor groups in case of malfunction, so if even one traction motor fails, the entire power car's traction motor circuit is turned off (the other power cars can still provide enough power, so despite this the train can, and sometimes does, remain in service).

==== Protective equipment ====
Protection of traction motors from short circuits is accomplished by means of a fast-acting circuit breaker, which disconnects the traction circuit within 2-5 milliseconds if the current exceeds 575±25 amps. In case of a short to ground where the current does not exceed this level, protection is accomplished by a differential relay which compares current at both ends of the circuit and opens the circuit breaker if the difference in current exceeds 40 amps. The traction motors are also protected by a wheelslip relay which trips if the angular velocity of one of the traction motors significantly differs from the others (wheelslip, skidding, stripped gears, etc.) and an overload relay which trips if the current in a traction motor's circuit exceeds 265 amps; tripping of these relays automatically reduces the train's acceleration. The engineer's instrument panel has warning lights which illuminate when any of these relays trip (except for the differential relay—its action can be deduced from certain peculiarities in the tripping of the circuit breaker), and the tripping of the wheelslip relay also activates a warning bell.

To protect maintenance workers from electrocution, all high-voltage cabinets have safety switches which automatically lower the pantograph if the cabinet is opened while the power car is energized. Late-model ER2s also feature a ladder blocking relay which prevents the extension of maintenance ladders when the pantograph is raised, thus preventing workers and bystanders from climbing onto the roof. For passenger safety, all doors are equipped with position sensors which notify the engineer whether all doors are shut (however, in practice it is standard operating procedure for the fireman to step out onto the platform and check the doors visually).

Other protective equipment includes the voltage relay (which trips if the voltage in the high-voltage circuit falls below 2400 V), the dynamotor/compressor overload relay, the heating circuit overload relay, and the automatic control shutoff switch. This last shuts off the traction motor controls when the air pressure in the brake pipe falls below a preset level, which prevents the train from starting with inoperative brakes.

In ER2 electric trainsets (their numbering starts with 300) DK-604B dynamotors, BVP-105A-1 fast switches are installed. These switches have diafragmatic lead. 40KN400 alkaline batteries are used instead of acid batteries.

It is necessary to point out the following from the most significant construction improvements.

In electric trainsets released in 1965 N. E. Galakhov's amortizers are changed by cylindrical springs. The same time hydraulic amortizers are installed between trolley frame edges, and upper beam above the amortizer. The static deformation of amortizing system is increased from 95 mm (3.74 in) up to 120 mm (4.72 in). The body weight is transmitted to improved trolleys through edge sliders, while ______ serves only for transmitting horizontal forces.

In 1964 one electric trainset was released with rubber clutches instead of ______ clutches between shafts of motor and speed reduction couple. By the end of 1965 five more trainsets with such clutches were released.

In 1964 URT-110A traction engines had been installed on electric trainsets. (unified traction engines from Riga) In difference of DK-106B engines collectors are plastic, the isolation of coil, electrode, and rotor is made of escapon. Brush holders are plastic. The electromechanical features of motor remained the same.

In 1965 due to installation of more stable pantograph isolators (made of plexi glass AG-4), the relay system developed by N. A. Lapin was excluded from trains' construction.

In 1963 one of electric trains (ER2a-413) was released with "auto-engineer." It entered Moscow - Klin segment of October railroad for experimental testing.

While speed reduction ratio is 1:3.17, wheel diameter is 1,050 mm (41.34 in), and electric engine clamp voltage is 1500 volts, ER1 and ER2 electric trainsets have following traction data:

The speed is __ km/h, the traction force is __ kg, increased field - 51.8 5270, normal field 71.2 4040. In long timing mode increased field - 59 3530, normal field 82.4 2790.

In case of a 2.5 km (1.6 mi) distance between stops the speed is up to 95 km/h (59 mph). In case of 5 km (3.1 mi) - 110 km/h (68 mph). The minimum radius of curvature is 100 m (328 ft) at a speed of 5 km/h (3.1 mph).

In 1966-1975 period the railcar manufacturing plant of Riga continued the release of ER2 suburban electric trainsets, for 3000 V DC. They started to be built already in 1962. Basic electric equipment for these trains was manufactured by Electric Machinery plant of Riga. The majority of electric trainsets was released in 10 car versions (five countable sections), part in 8-car edition (four countable sections). The separate section edition was accepted too. (?) Electric trainsets can be used in 12-car, 6-car, as well as 4-car compositions. Railcars' length is 20.10 m (65 ft 11 in) including auto-couplers.

== Electrical and mechanical details ==
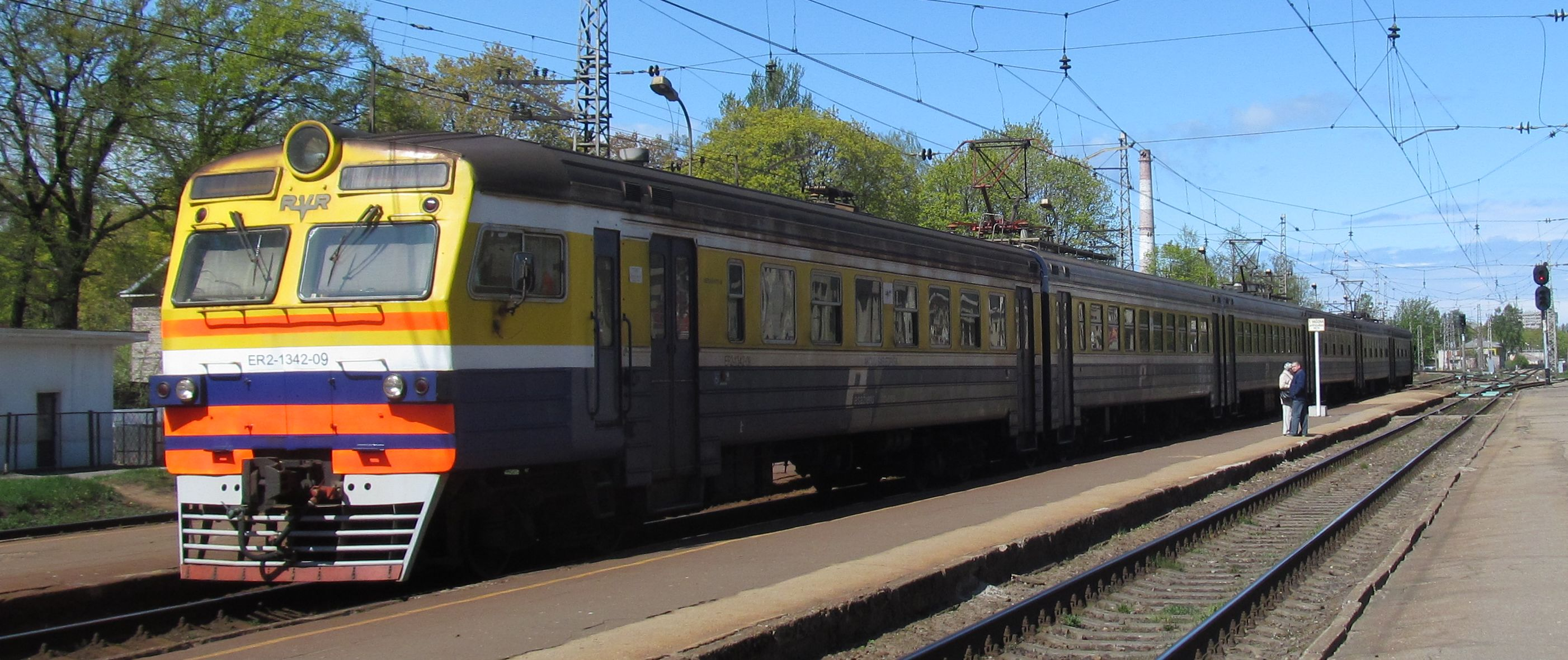
Original ER2 in Pasažieru vilciens livery, Riga

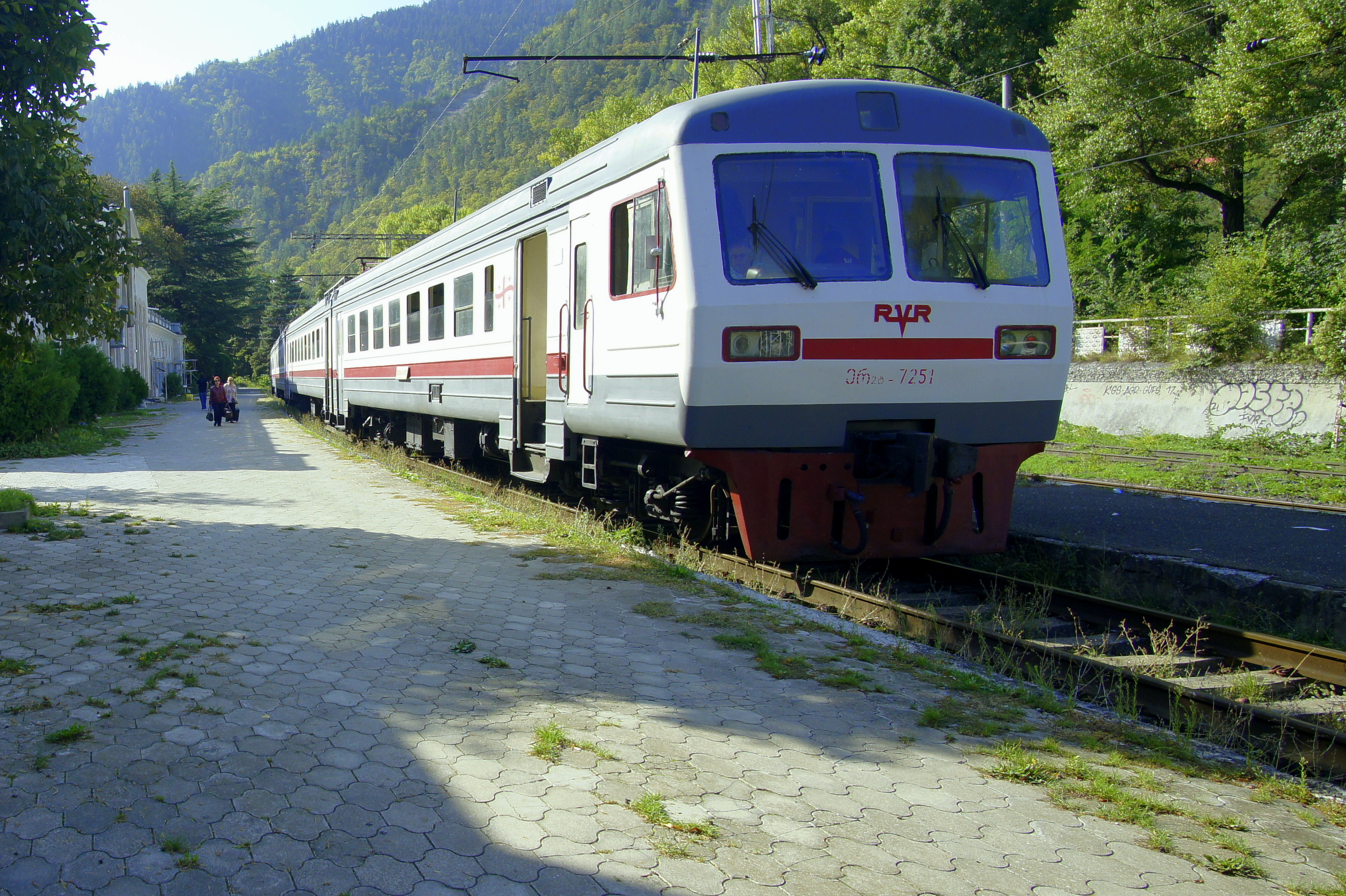
ER2T Georgian Railway

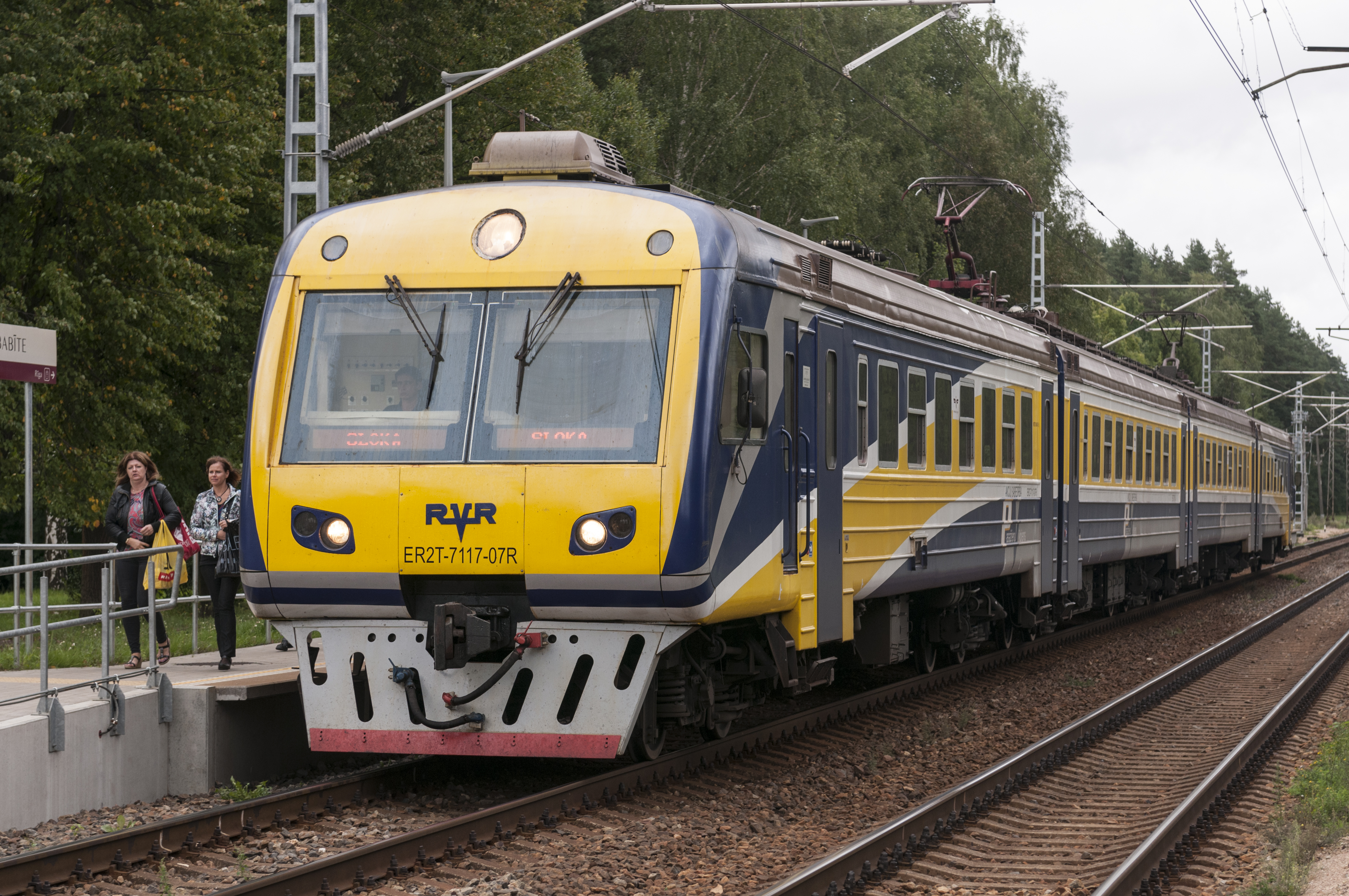
Refurbished ER2T in the Babīte Station

Motor and trailer cars feature two double-axed bogies with two-section amortizer suspensions. The body is supported on beam over the amortizers, equipped by rubber dowel, through edge sliders; while ____ serves only for transmitting horizontal forces. The beam over the amortizer is supported on four cylindrical springs (2 sections per each). they are installed on ____, and suspended ______ to bogie's frame. ... The static deformation of motor car suspension is 105 mm (4.13 in). Such bogies are in use since ER2-514 trainset (1965). Bogie frames feature stamped & welded construction; they are H-shaped. They consist of four beams. They are 2 longitudinal, 2 transverse, and 4 ____ beams. Bogie frames are connected with the beam over the amortizer, using hydraulic amortizers, which balance the oscillations above the amortizers.

The wheel pairs of motor cars are made with spoke and bandage centers; new bandage diameter is 1,050 mm (41.34 in). One of wheel pair centers have plate-like _____. The cogged gear is attached to it by bolts. Two cylindrical friction reducers are placed on the "neck" of a wheel pair. Their diameter is 130 mm (5.12 in). Reduction couple's body is supported on a wheel pair through a pair of friction reducers. Reducers' diameter is 200 mm (7.87 in). From the other side reducer's body is linked to a bogie by a pitched pin.

The speed reduction ratio is 23:73 (1:3.17). Transmission coefficient is 10. Traction engine rotor is connected with a gear train through the rigid clutch (rubber cord shell). The wheelbase of the motor car bogie is 2,600 mm (102.36 in), the distance between ____ axis is 13,300 mm (43 ft 7.62 in). The trailer car bogies have the same suspension scheme, like motor cars. the wheel diameter of trailer car is 950 mm (37.40 in). The wheels are solid. The wheelbase is 2,400 mm (94.49 in). The braking is double-sided; it's made using brake shoes - two for each wheel. On motor car bogies two braking cylinders are installed. Their diameter is 10 inches (250 mm).

URT-110A four pole electric traction engines are installed in ER2 trains since March 1964. The main poles (electrodes) are placed on horizontal and vertical spokes, while additional poles with 45 degree angle to them. The anchor is manufactured with a wave coil; class C isolation is in use on poles and anchor. The fan features welded construction, and attached to a back coil holder. The maximal revolving frequency of engine is 2080 rpm, the engine weight 2,150 kg (4,740 lb).

Every motor car has one pantograph. In case of doing wrong the rest four motor cars can lead the train to the closest terminal. According to the same way of reasoning there are not disconnectors for separate motor groups, in the power circuitry; and when one electric engine is damaged, entire motor car turns off.

VVP-105 quick switch with a diafragmatic lead is in use for protecting circuitry from short circuit currents. It brakes electric engine circuit when the current gets over 600 A. Differential relay can serve for the protection purpose, in case of overthrows and fan-outs (?) on the ground when the current does not rich 600 A. The overloading relay has no effect on disconnecting devices; it liquidates overloading in starting mode, by lowering switching conditions and adding the additional resistor in a circuit.

KSP - 1A power controller, developed by L. N. Reshetov, features electro-pneumatic control and 12 contactor elements. the controller features 18 working positions.

Position # 1: Maneuvering mode.

Positions # 2 .. 18: Rheostatic starting with serial connection of all four engines.

Position # 9: Serial connection of electric engines, Rheostats are excluded.

Position # 10: Transitional step of excitement weakening (67%)

Position # 11: Excitement brought down to (50%)

Position # 12: Electric traction engines are connected in parallel, rheostats are added, and the excitement is 50%.

Position # 13 .. 15 Rheostatic starting, engines connected in parallel, 100% excitement

Position # 16 Engines are connected in series of two, and excitement is 100%

Position # 17 Transitional step of excitement (67%)

Position # 18 50% excitement, engines connected in parallel.

Engineer's controllers are mounted in control panels. They have two handles, (reversive, and main) Reversive features three positions: Drive, 0, and Reverse. The main handle features 8 positions. They are 0, Maneuvering, 1st running (9th of KSP,) 2nd running (11th of KSP,) 2A and 3a for manual starting, 3rd running (16th of KSP,) and 4th running (18th of KSP.)

Switching from parallel to serial engine connection is done by bridge method. .... PK-305 electric locomotive contacts are installed as linear and bridge contacts in ER2 motor cars. PK-305 are manufactured by the Electric Locomotive Plant of Novocherkassy.

In order to unload the power source of cab car, and decrease the voltage drop in train wires, the part of supplementary contactors and withholding coils of quick switches are powered by power source of their own section (neighboring trailer car)

The power controller is under the acceleration relay in case of manual starting. In case of automatic starting controller's shaft is turned to a next position, and the current in electric engine is brought down to 170 to 180 amperes. The starting with less transfer currents is possible for a next position 125 A. For this purpose, an engineer must push "Decreased Acceleration Button". In case of one wheel pair boxing, the boxing relay acts on acceleration relay, and the current becomes 70 A.

DK604-B aggregates are installed on cab and trailer cars. They consist of bicollector voltage divider (dynamotor) for EK-7A motor compressors which need 1500 V, and current generator for control circuits, lighting, etc. In case of 3000 volts, the divider has a normal power of 12 kW (16 hp) (5.3 A, 1000 rpm,) the generator has a power 10 kW (13 hp), 50 V, 200 A.

EK-7A motor compressors are installed in cab and trailer cars. The feature 0.62 m^{3}/min (22 cu ft/min) air providing speed. They use DK409-B electric engines (5 kW or 6.7 hp, 1500 V, 4.4 A). 40KN-100 rechargeable batteries are located in trailer and cab cars.

ER2 motor car weighs 54,600 kg (120,400 lb), cab car - 40,000 kg (88,000 lb), trailer car - 38,000 kg (84,000 lb).

In process of ER2 production, the manufacturing plants have introduced a lot of changes in trainset construction. These changes were intended for increasing the stability of train use, and riders' comfort. Since August 1968 instead of P-1V or P1-U pantographs, TL13-U pantographs (with carbon insertions) and TL13-M with cooper insertions are being installed on trainsets.

In October 1968 the braking relay is introduced in the scheme. It provides electro-pneumatic braking along with linear contactor shut-off. The same year DK-406 electric engines were changed by DK-409B engines in compressors. And the compressor was improved into EK-7B.

Since May 1970, 40NK-125 batteries are installed instead of 40KN-100.

Since January 1971, URT-110B electric traction engines are in use instead of URT-110A. URT-110B features collector with an arc-like design.

In September 1972, the adjustable (?) brush holder compression are used in URT-110B electric traction, and well as DK-604B voltage divider.

Starting with ER2-982, the lid strengthening, and under-car drawer locks are improved

== Face redesign ==
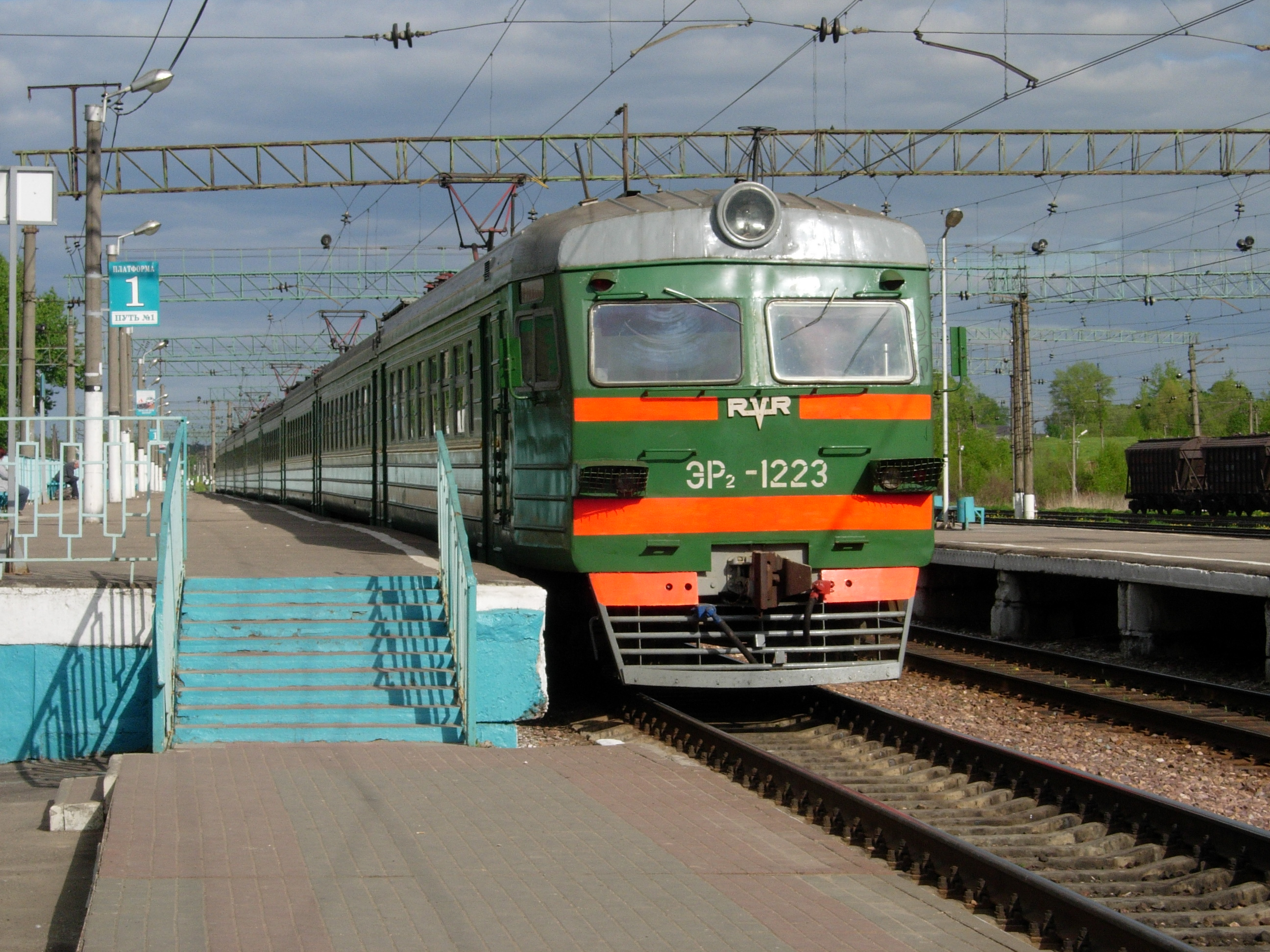
ER2-1223 in 2009 at Volokolamsk.

In 1974, starting with ER2-1028 electric trainset, engineer's cab became more flat, and. (unified with other series like, ER22, ER9p.) The same time instead of KMR-2A3 engineer's controllers, 1 KU-021 controllers were installed. _____ heating of engineer's cab, and engineer's valve are introduced.

On ER2-906 electric trainset the "Auto-Engineer" (AM-CNII) system testing had started. It took place on Moscow segment of October Railroad in 1975.

== 12 car edition ==
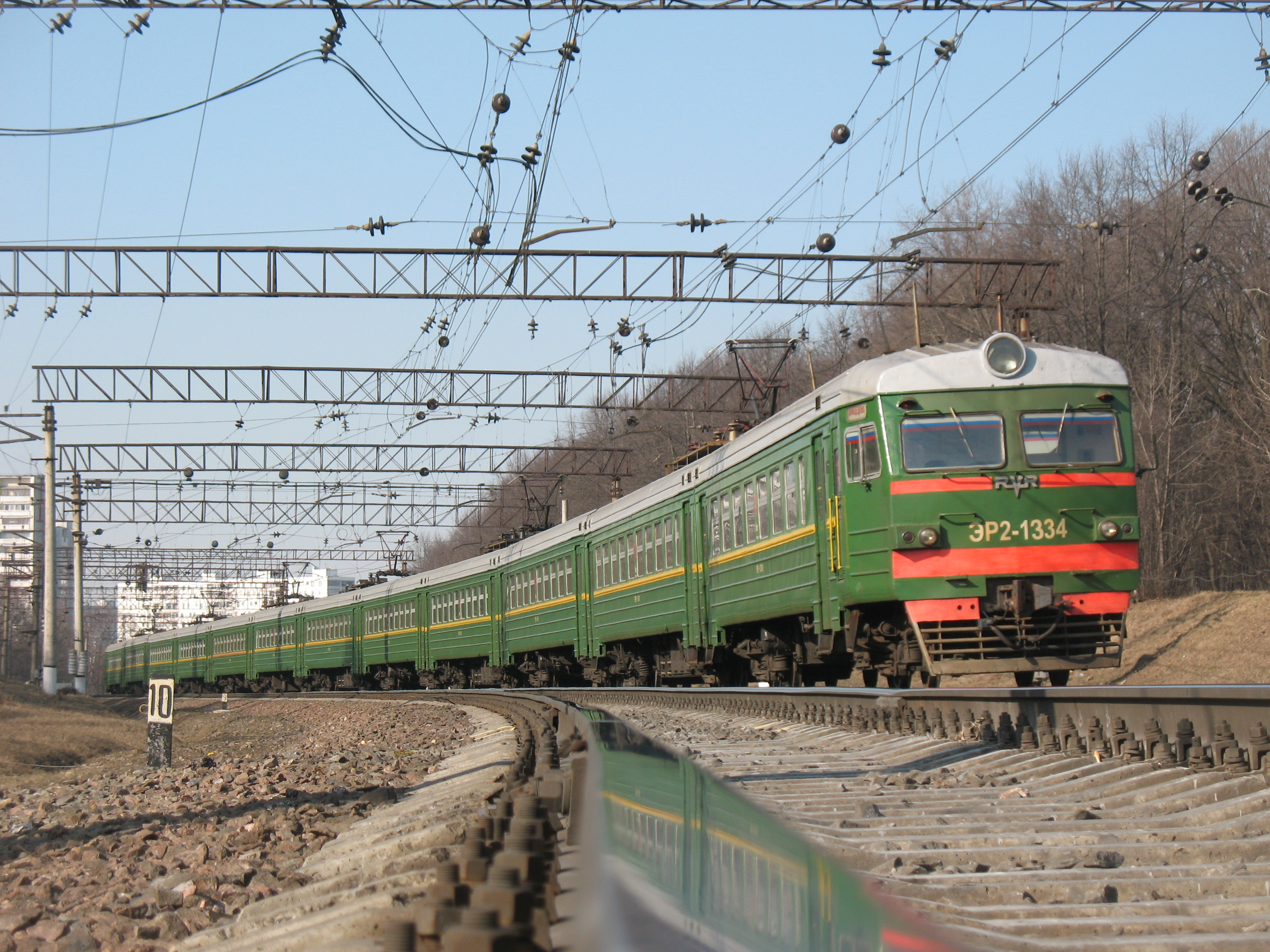
ER2-1334. 12-car formation is primary train scheme for Moscow oblast in 1980-s - 2010-s

In the 1976-1984 period the Railcar, Manufacturing Plant of Riga continued the release of ER2 electric trainsets (Manufacturing Sign 62–61) They were designed for 3000 V DC. Their construction began in 1962. The basic equipment for these trains were produced by Electric Machinery Plant of Riga. The majority of trainsets were released in the 10-car edition (five countable sections). Some were in the 12-car edition (six countable sections). Separate sections were available (cab + motor + trailer). The electric trains can be used in twelve, ten, eight, and four-car compositions. In the process of the ER2 release, various improvements were introduced in the carriages' construction. They were intended to improve interior, exterior outlook, as well as passengers' and crew's comfort, particularly, the shape of engineer's cab, the installation of other pantographs, as well as some other machinery.

== Railcar numbering ==
ER2 railcar numbering consists of a trainset number, and car number written consequently. The motor cars have following numbers: 02, 04, 06, 08, 10, and 12 (even), cab cars are 01 and 09 (07 Cab is only in eight car edition, which was produced by plants of Riga and Kalinin at the end of 1969) The trailer cars are 03, 05, 07, and 11 (odd). Complete number of ER2-955 first cab car will be ER2-95501.

The number of seats in cab car is 88, in motor cars 110, and trailer cars 108.

== Passenger scape redesign ==
On basis of constructing and using ER22 electric trainsets, starting with ER2-1112 electric trainset, the following improvements was made.

- The number of arches on train's roof, and distance between them is made the same.
- In passengers' salon (space) the cushioned seats are installed, aluminum profiles are used instead of wooden.
- On trainsets starting with ER2-1228, the edge walls of body, and trans-window sheets are fabricated as one long part.

The same differences can be observed, comparing ER9M and ER9P subtypes of ER9 electric trainset

== See also ==
- The Museum of the Moscow Railway, at Paveletsky Rail Terminal, Moscow
- Rizhsky Rail Terminal, Home of the Moscow Railway Museum
- Varshavsky Rail Terminal, St.Petersburg, Home of the Central Museum of Railway Transport, Russian Federation
- History of rail transport in Russia

== Bibliography ==
- V. A. Rakov Locomotives and MU rolling stock of Soviet Union Railroads 1956–1965
- All about Russian Electric Trains
- Documentary of Soviet electric EMU trains of the ER-series (ER2 c 0:00, ER2R 1:16:42-1:19:25, ER2T 1:28:51-1:35:33)
