= Rīgas vagonbūves rūpnīca =

Rolling stock manufacturer

Rigas vagonbūves rūpnīca
- Type: Subsidiary
- Industry: Rail transport
- Predecessor: Ford-Vairogs
- Founded: 1895
- Defunct: 2017; 9 years ago
- Fate: Defunct
- Headquarters: Riga, Latvia
- Area served: Former Soviet Union
- Products: Rail vehicles

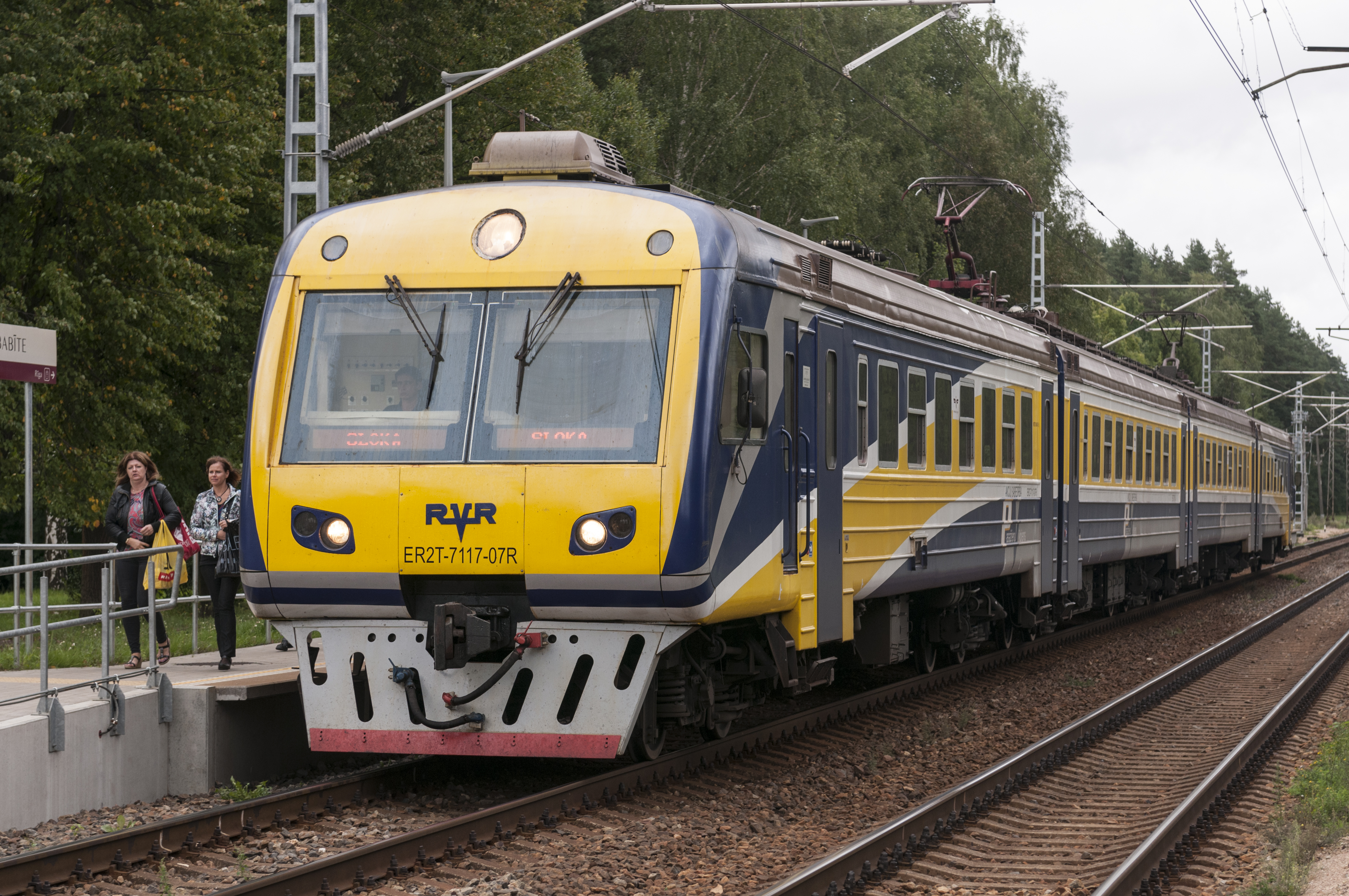
Refurbished ER2T at the Babīte Station

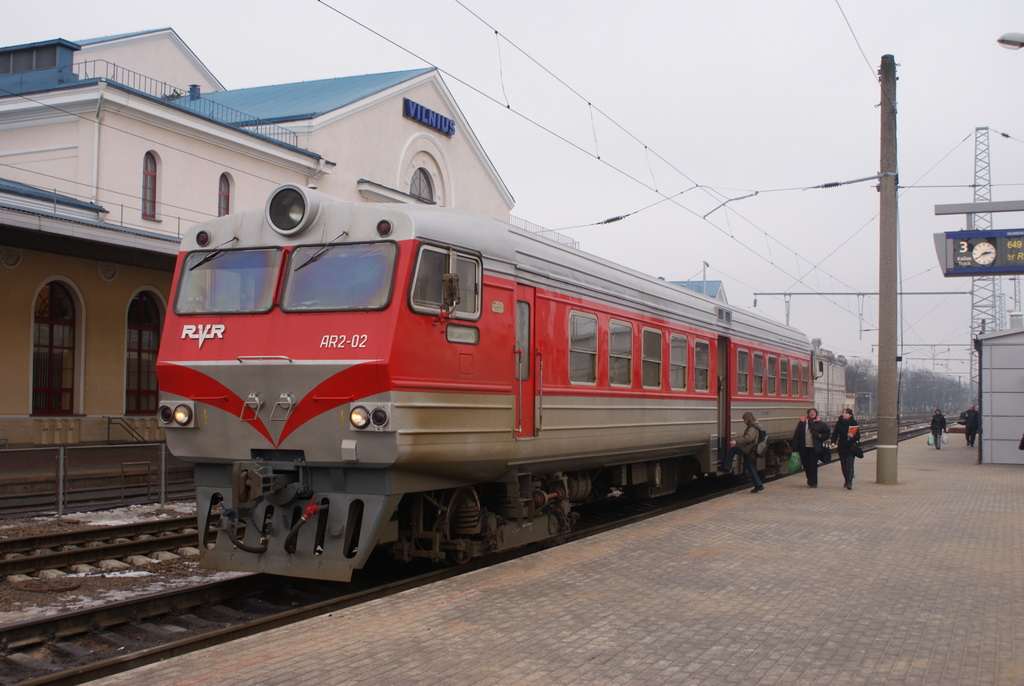
AR2-002 railbus at Vilnius passenger station, Lithuania

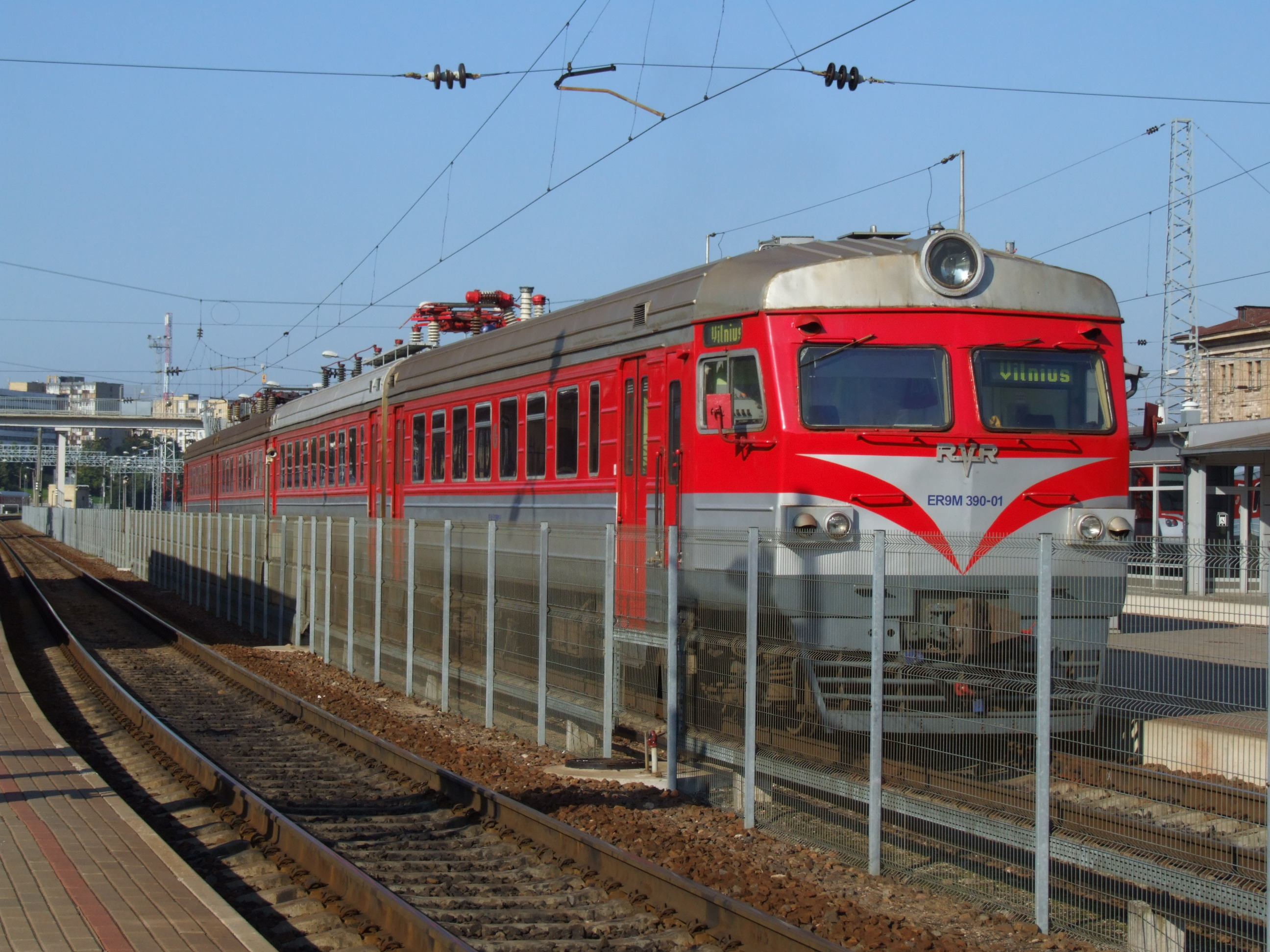
ER9M-390-1 at Vilnius passenger station, Lithuania

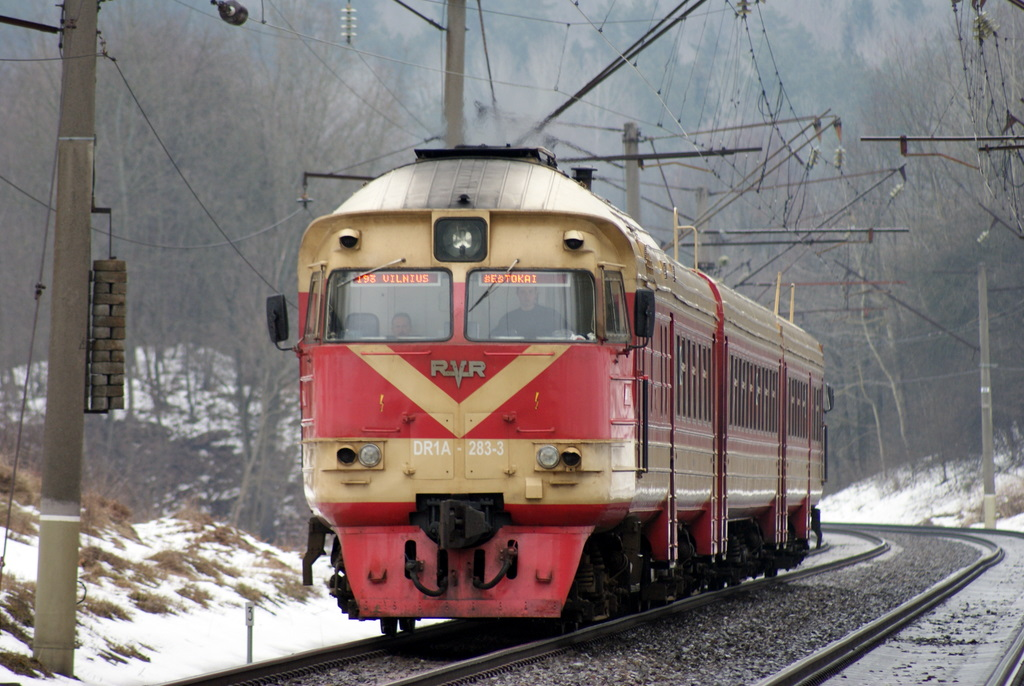
DR1A-283M near Paneriai, Lithuania

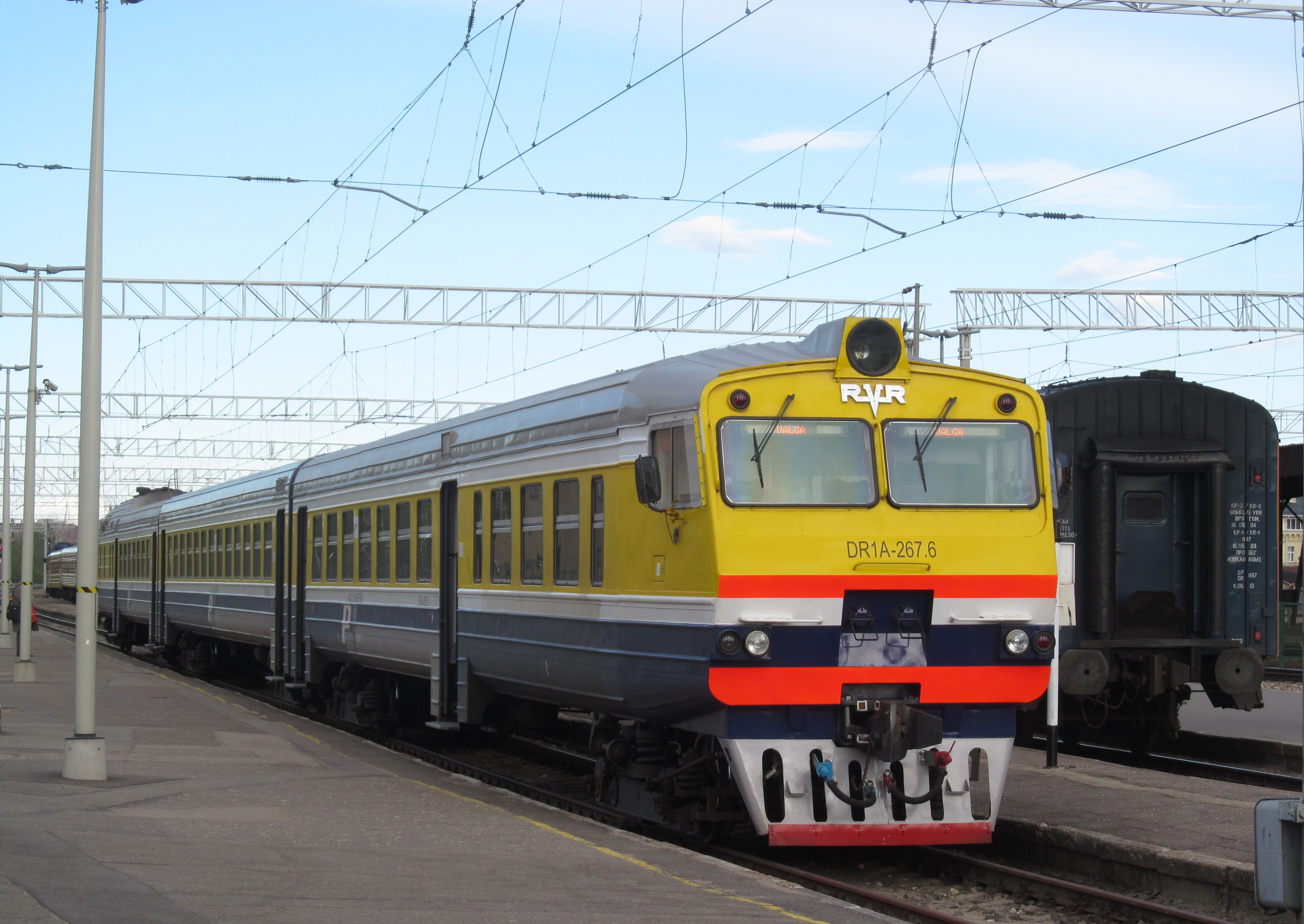
DR1A-267.6 at Riga Central Station

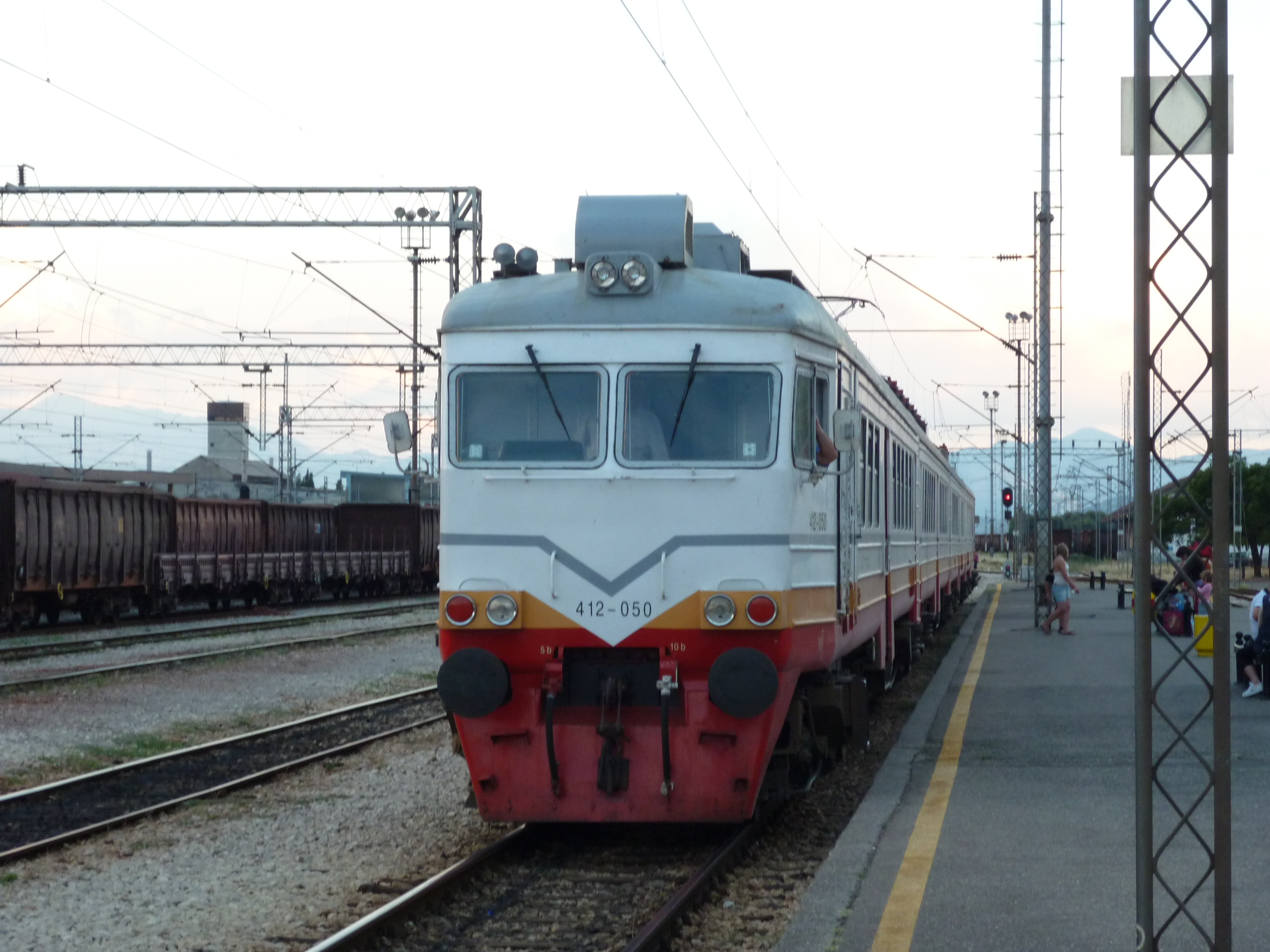
Electric Multiple Unit ŽCG 412-050 at Podgorica station, Montenegro

Rīgas vagonbūves rūpnīca (RVR) was a Latvian rail and tram vehicle manufacturer, most notable for its multiple unit trains and tram vehicles used throughout the Soviet Union and its successor states. It has been insolvent and non-operational since 2017.

== History ==
The original works were founded in 1895 by the businessman Oscar Freywirth under the name Fēnikss. In 1936, Fenikss was reorganised into Joint Stock Company Vairogs, which later manufactured Ford-Vairogs automobiles under licence. Expropriated by the state following the takeover of Latvia by the Soviet Union and renamed RVR, it became for many years the largest producer of electric and diesel trains in the USSR and also produced tramcars. Its best known products are the ER1, ER2, ER7, ER9 and ER31 electric trains, DR1, DR1A and DR1P diesel trains, many of which are still in service today. Between 1973 and 1988 it built the high-speed ER200 train. Following the collapse of the Soviet Union and the Comecon, the factory ceased operations in 1996 and was declared bankrupt in 1998. Privatized in two parts, one was bought by Severstal, a company controlled by Russian oligarch Alexey Mordashov. In 2001 the factory was bought by a holding company and new diesel units were built for Belarusian Railways from 2005 to 2008. Other orders were primarily for the refurbishment of the units it had previously manufactured. After its ownership structure changed several times it entered insolvency in 2017, following a dearth of orders for new vehicles for several years and several failed attempts at partnerships with other rail manufacturers.

== Products ==
=== Trains ===
- AR-1 first produced 1969
- AR-2 first produced 1997
- DR-1 / DR-1P / DR-1A / DR-1B beginning in 1963
- ER-1 first produced 1957
- ER-2 / ER-2R / ER-2T beginning in 1962
- ER-3 produced 1963
- ER-6 prototype only in 1965
- ER-7 first produced 1957
- ER-9 / ER-9P / ER-9M / ER-9E / ER-9ET / ER-9T first produced 1962
- ER-10 first produced 1960
- ER-11 produced 1965
- ER-12 first produced 1976
- ER-31 first produced 1980
- ER-35 first produced 1980
- Er-200 first produced 1974

=== Trams ===
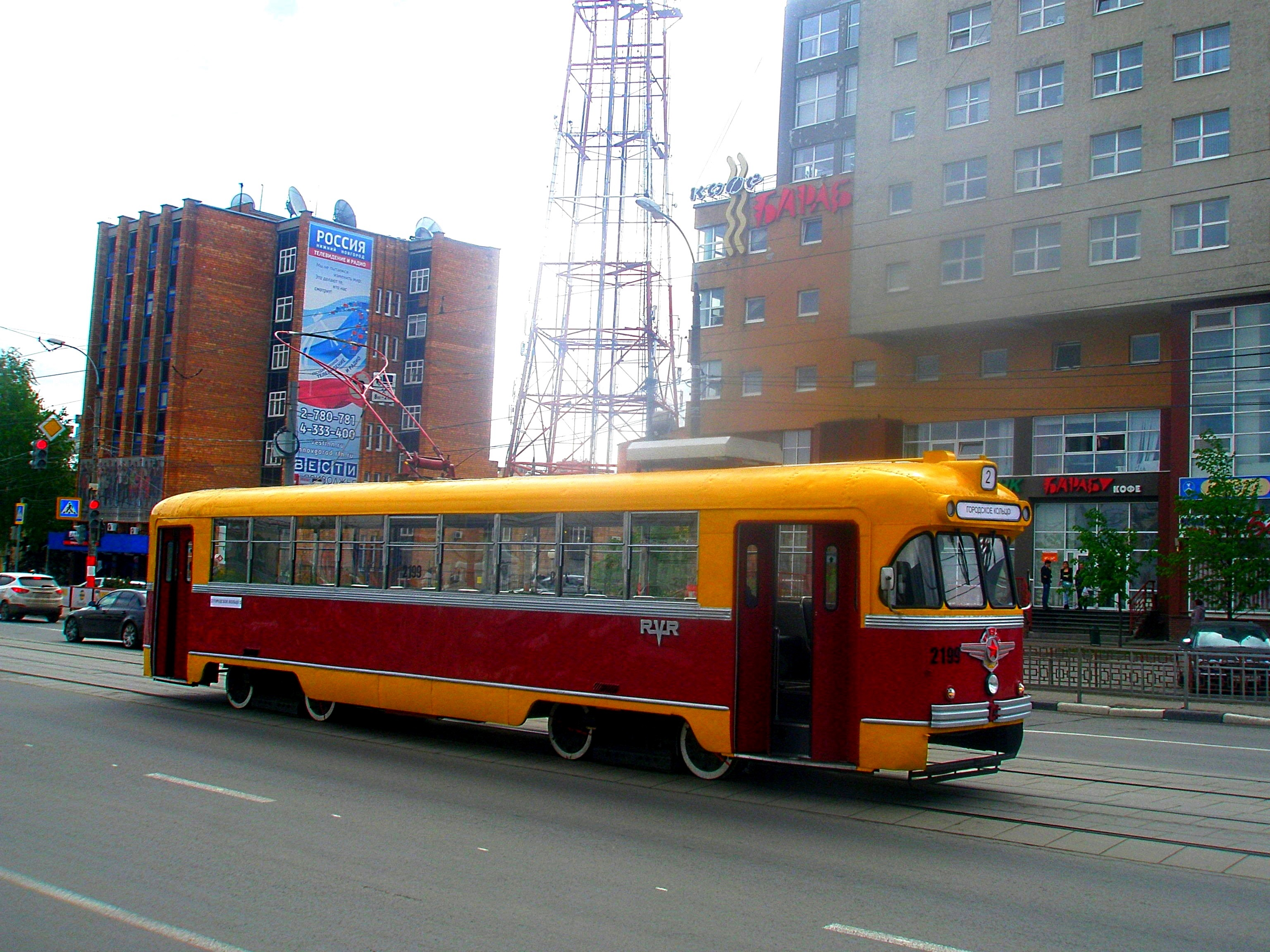
RVZ-6M2 tram in Nizhny Novgorod, 2015

From 1923 to 1930 the factory produced some 40 tram cars for Riga. After World War II, in 1949 the factory started producing the MTV-82 tram. Between 1960 and 1989 more than 6000 RVR-6 tram cars were built.

== Current operators ==
Many RVR trains built during the Soviet period are still in active service across the former USSR. Current operators are shown below. Very few, if any, RVR tramcars are still in operation, with most cities of the former USSR favouring tramcars built by ČKD Tatra.

Company name	Country	Types in service (number)
Armenian Railways	Armenia	ER2 (66)
Azerbaijan State Railway	Azerbaijan	ER2 (74)
Bulgarski Durzhavni Zheleznitsi	Bulgaria	Class 32 (79), Class 33 (6)
Belaruskaya Chyhunka	Belarus	ER9 (57), DR1 (~100), DR1A (~70) DR1B (15) DRB1 (12), DRB1m (7), DR1Pt (5)
Georgian Railway	(Georgia (country)) Georgia	ER2 (~100)
Kazakhstan Temir Zholy	Kazakhstan	ER9 (77), DR1 (14) DR1A (14)
Lietuvos Geležinkeliai	Lithuania	ER9 (16), DR1 (12)
Pasažieru vilciens	Latvia	ER2 (108), ER2T (23), DR1A (46), DR1AM (9), DR1AC (5)
Željeznički prevoz Crne Gore	Montenegro	Class 412 (5)
Makedonski Železnici	North Macedonia	Class 412 (4)
Rossiyskye Zheleznye Dorogi	Russia	ER1 (260), ER2 (1106), ER22 (66), ER200 (2), ER9 (617)
Železnice Srbije	Serbia	Class 412 (38)
Ukrzaliznytsia	Ukraine	ER1 (?), ER2 (?), ER9 (?), DR1A (57), DR1P (21)

== See also ==
- Category:Electric multiple units of Russia at Wikimedia Commons
