= DR1 diesel train =

Diesel multiple unit

DR1
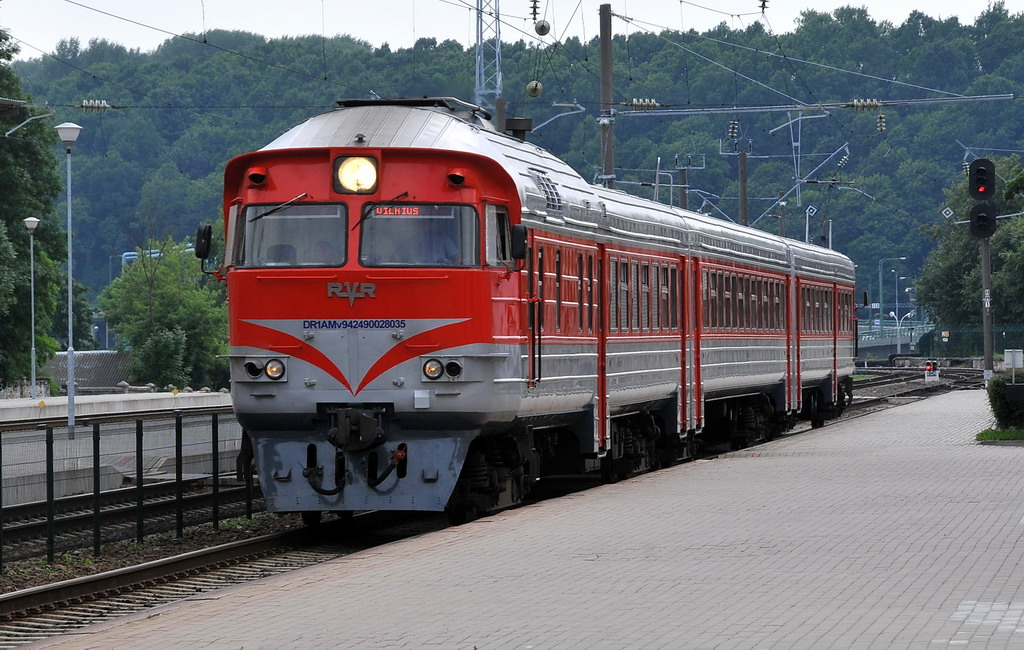
- LG DR1AM in Kaunas
- Manufacturer: Rīgas Vagonbūves Rūpnīca
- Constructed: 1963 - 1998

Specifications
- Train length: 154.35 m (506.4 ft) (six car train)
- Width: 3,120 mm (10 ft 3 in)
- Height: 4,465 mm (14 ft 7.8 in)
- Weight: 90 tons (motor car), 40 tons (trail car)
- Prime mover: M756B
- Transmission: Hydraulic
- Acceleration: 0.3 m/s^{2} (0.98 ft/s^{2})
- Braking system: Disc brake
- Coupling system: SA3
- Track gauge: 1,520 mm (4 ft 11 27/32 in) Russian gauge

The DR1 (Russian: Дизельпоезд Рижский 1) (English: Diesel-train Riga 1) diesel trainset was manufactured by Rīgas Vagonbūves Rūpnīca from 1963 to 1998. In 2025 DR1 trainsets (different modifications) are still in use in Georgia, Kazakhstan, Latvia, Lithuania, Belarus and Ukraine. They remained in use by Edelaraudtee in Estonia until 2014 and by Russian Railways in Russia until 2016.

== Modifications ==
DR1 (first batch) — Introduced in 1963. On units DR1-01 through DR1-08, the shape of the front fascia was rounded and looked like that of ER1 electric multiple unit. The entire first batch has been decommissioned.

DR1 (second batch) — The first unit of the batch, DR1-09, was introduced in 1966. Some of the units were named DR1M. The design of the front fascia of this batch of units is completely different. The DR1A-014 and later units were equipped with then-new types of headlights. Units with older headlights were withdrawn. These newer versions are still in service as departmental units in Russia. In Belarus, all of them were converted to DRB1m units. These early DR1 unites were numbered DR1-09 to DR1-053 (except DR1-030, which carries the DR1P model number).

DR2 — A modification of second-batch DR1 units that were equipped with engines installed under the carriage instead of behind the cab, as was usual. Only one such prototype was built in 1966.

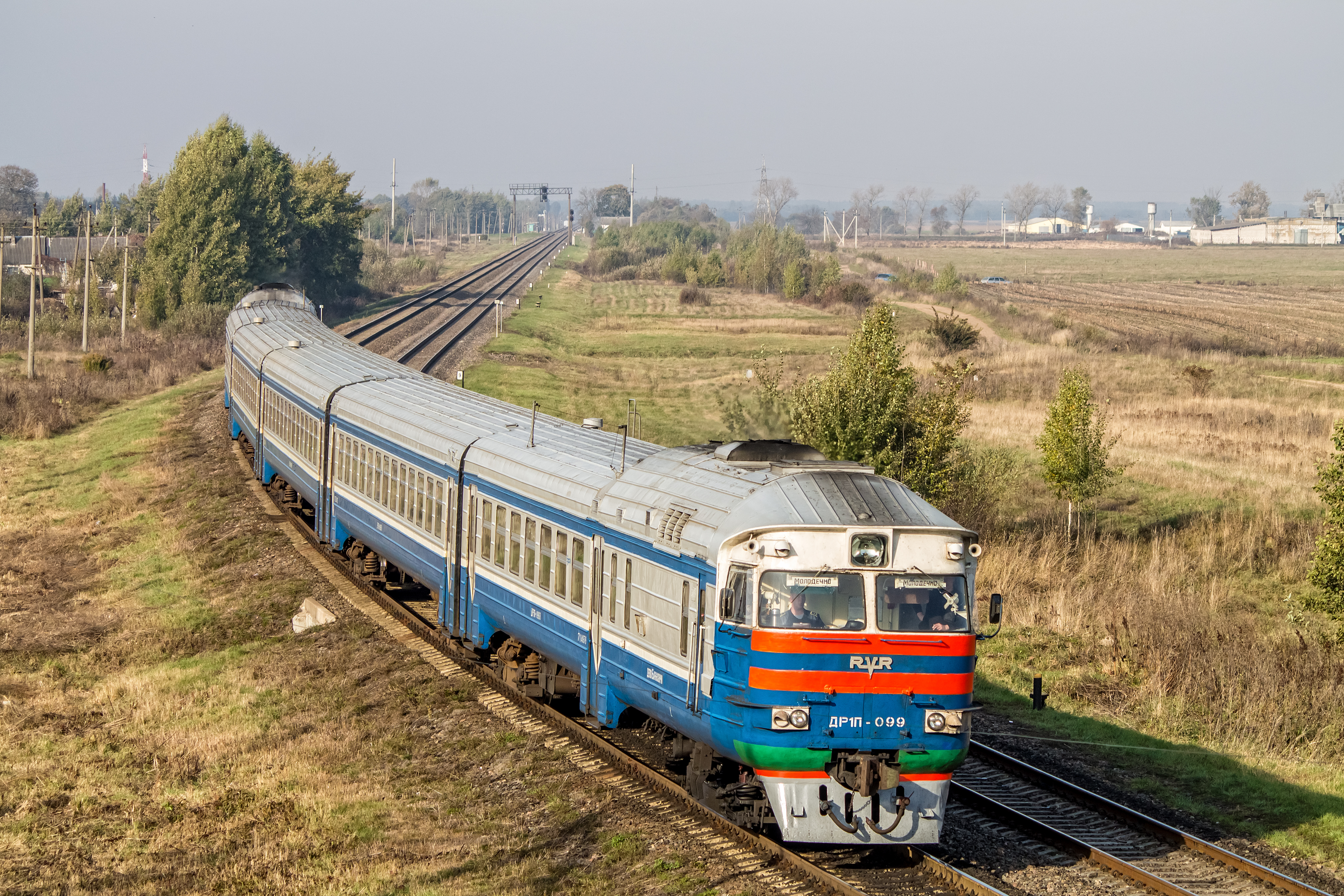
DR1P-099

DR1P — The prototype unit DR1P-030 was completed in 1969, and had a starter/generator instead of a separate diesel generator installed. Mass production began with the DR1P-054 unit. DR1P units are numbered DR1P-054 through DR1P-122, and DR1P-400 through DR1P-404. Almost all of them have been decommissioned.

DR1B1/DR1B1m/DR1pT — Refurbished DR1/DR1P units for Belarus Railways. The control carriages (those with driving controls in a DMU) of these units have the same exterior design as DR1AM's control carriages. The decommissioned driving carriages were replaced with 2M62/2M62U diesel locomotives.

DR1A (first batch) — The prototype, numbered DR1A-405, was assembled in 1973. Mass production began with the DR1A-123 unit manufactured in 1976. These units are still in service in some countries formerly occupied by the USSR. In Russia, units of this type have all been decommissioned (the last units were delivered to the Samara Rail Museum in 2012).

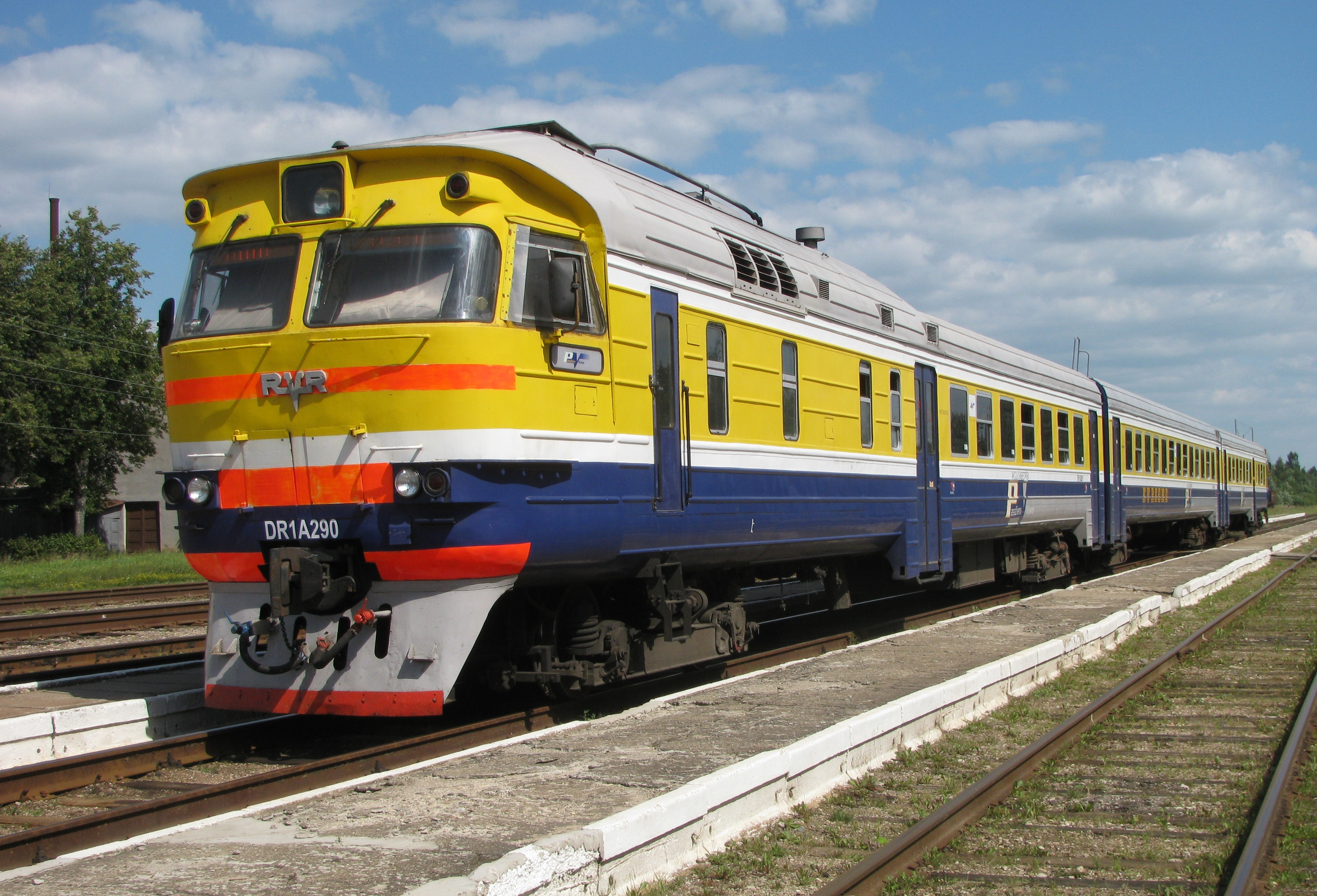
DR1A-290

DR1A (second batch) — The prototype, numbered DR1A-168, was finalized in 1977, and its front fascia got a complete facelift. However, its mass production started only after the dissolution of the Soviet Union, with minor changes to the units' headlights. These units are still in service in some of the countries formerly occupied by the Soviet Union. In Russia, these units were all decommissioned, because of the introduction of RA2 railbuses. The last Russia-based DR1A unit was delivered to the Kaliningrad Rail Museum in 2016.

DR6 — This trainset was based on second-batch DR1A units, and was constructed in 1990 for Cuban Railways. The units of this type have several improvements over earlier versions.

DR1AM — These are refurbished DR1A units in use by Georgian, Latvian, Lithuanian, and Ukrainian railway operators. The unit formation was reduced from five/six to three cars per trainset. In the 1990s, these units were equipped with new driving carriages that were converted from non-driving carriages. Both DR1A batches were refurbished; however, the driving carriages' exterior was always refactored into the style carried by second-batch DR1A units.

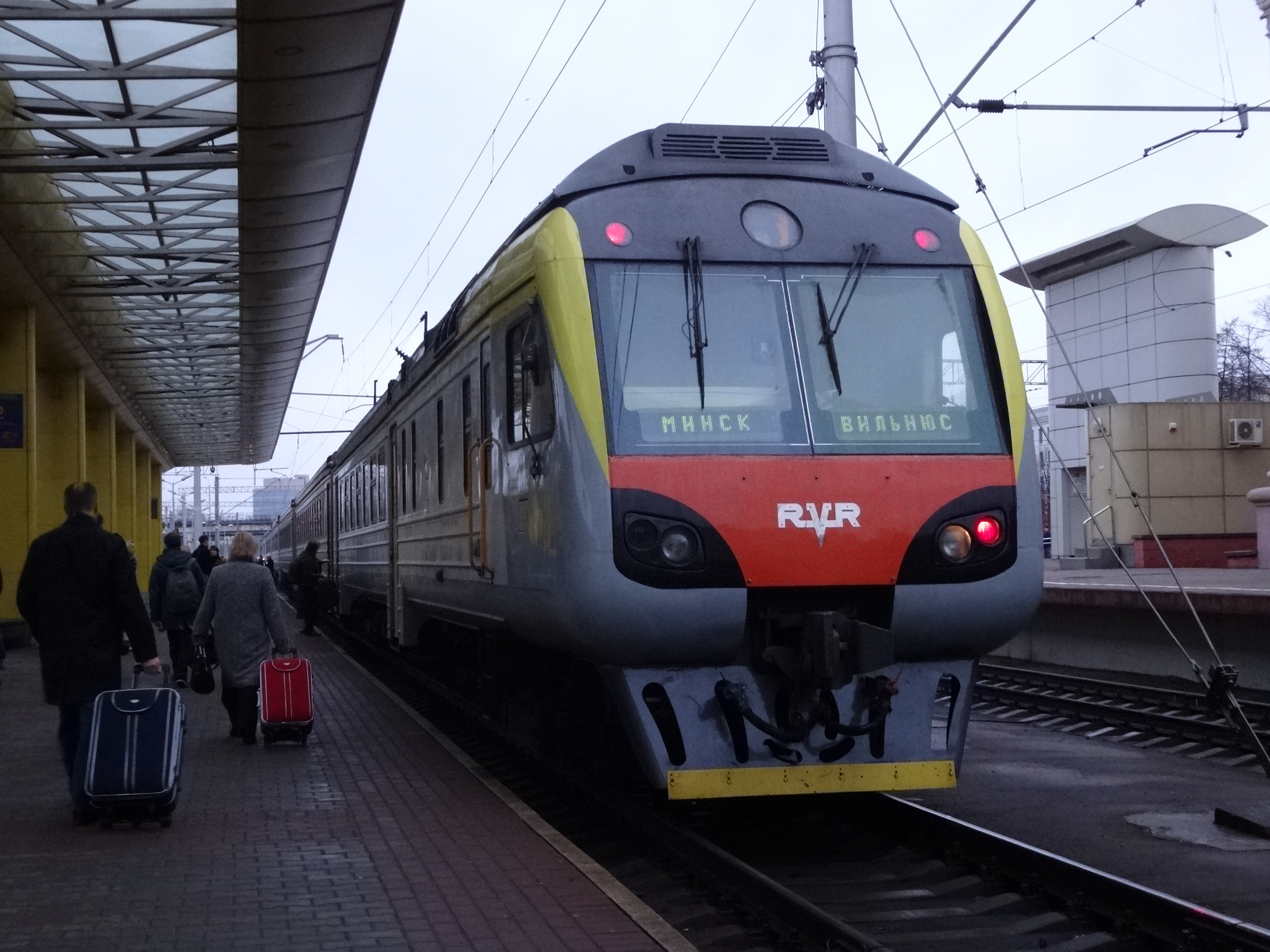
DR1B (500 Series)

500 Series DR1B — Newer trainsets built for Belarus Railways with an improved design. Equipped with driving carriages. They were officially named the 500 Series DR1B (rus. ДР1Б 500 серии) to prevent being confused with DR1B units.

DR1B — Refurbished DR1A sets in Estonia with original carriage formation. In Estonia, these were run by Edelaraudtee, and were all withdrawn from service in 2014, because of the introduction of Stadler Flirt units, and because of the end of Go Rail international services. Some trainsets were sold to Kazakhstan.

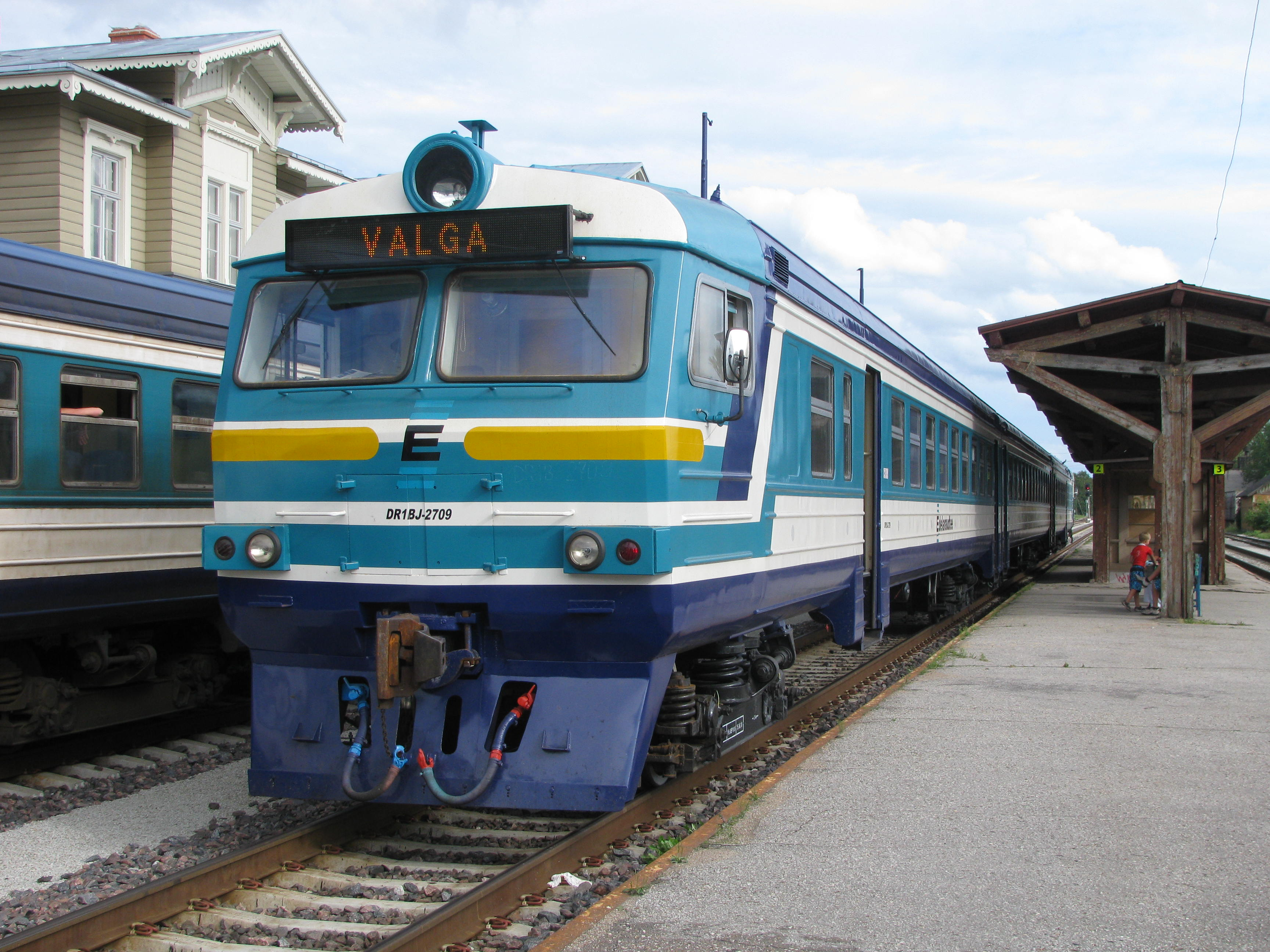
DR1BJ-2709

DR1BJ — Refurbished DR1A sets in Estonia. Their carriage formation was reduced from five/six to three cars per trainset. These were equipped with new driving carriages that were converted from non-driving carriages in the 1990s. Both batches of DR1A were refurbished. Unlike the DR1AM, the driving unit's design is similar to the later versions of ER2/ER9 electric multiple units.

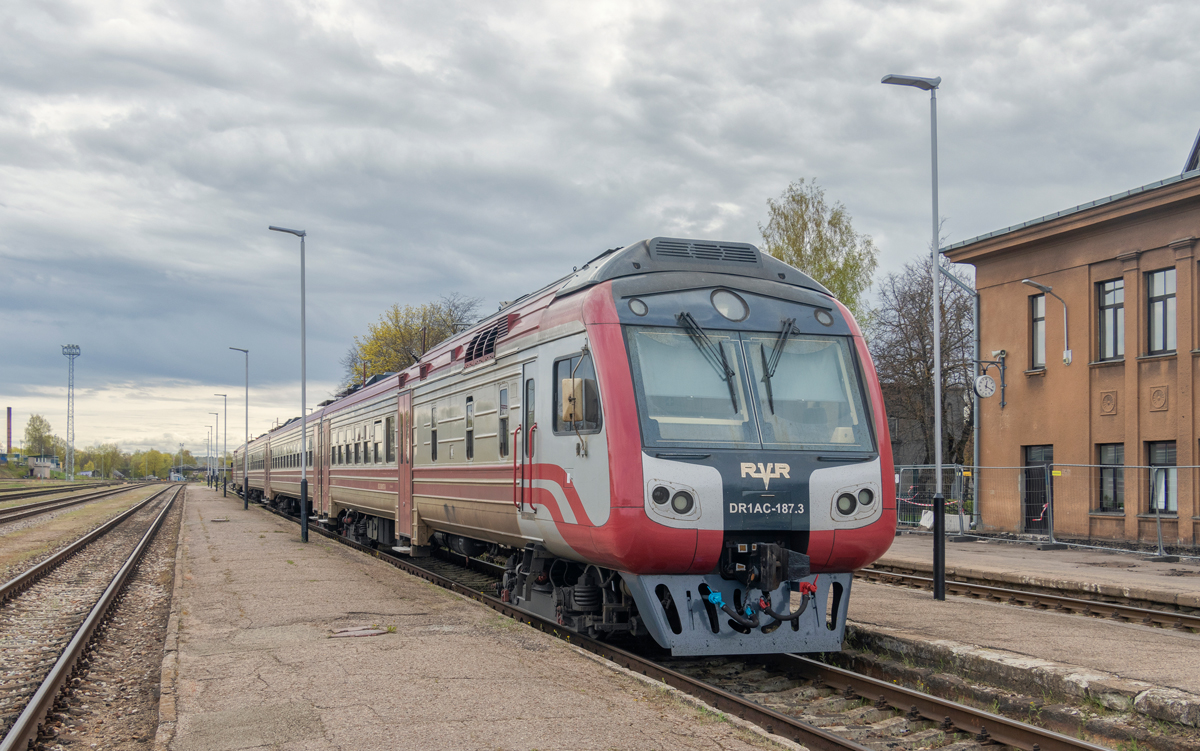
DR1AC-187

DR1AC — Refurbished DR1A units of Latvian Railways. After being refurbished, they look exactly the same as 500 Series DR1B units, apart from a unique silver and red paint scheme and red interior.

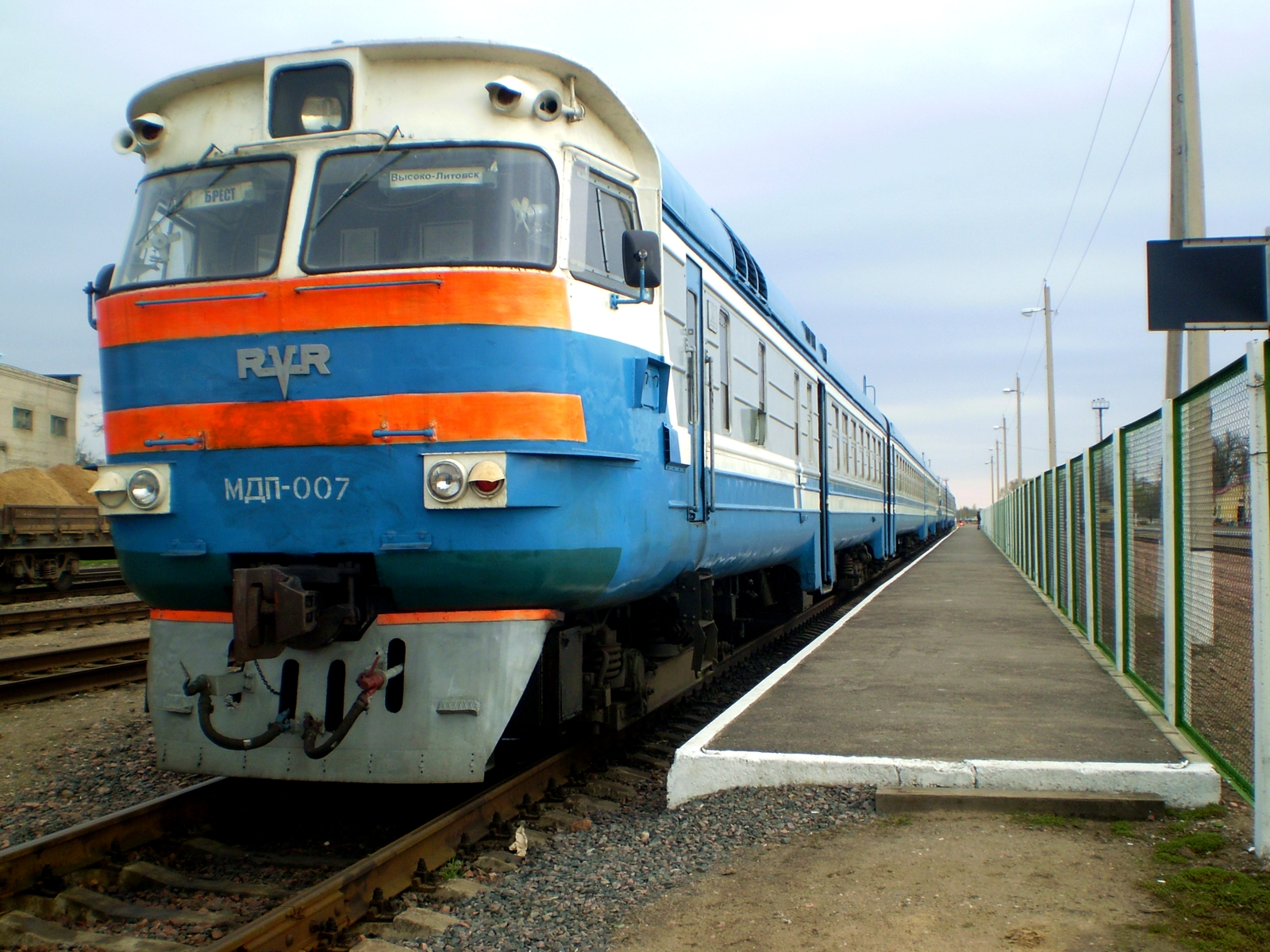
MDP-007

DRL1/MDP — Refurbished DR1A units of Belarus Railways. The carriage formation was reduced from five/six to three cars per trainset. Equipped with new driving carriages converted from non-driving carriages in the 1990s. Both batches of DR1A were refurbished; however, the exterior of each unit's driving carriage was refactored in second-batch DR1A style. Unlike DR1AM units, the driving carriages were converted from driving engine carriages, and not from non-driving carriages.

AR1/AR2 — A railbus internally based on DR1A design, but equipped with engines installed under the carriage instead of being installed behind the cab, as had been standard in DR2 units.

== In service ==
Data current as of 2017 (data for Latvia and Lithuania current as of 2022)
Belarus	Some DR1P trainsets are still in service. All DR1 and some DR1P and DR1A units were converted to DR1B1/DR1B1m/DR1pT or DRL1/MDP. These converted units are still in service. Some 500 Series DR1B units are used in international services to Lithuania.
Cuba	It is uncertain, whether Cuba's only DR6 trainset is in service, or not. Any information about that unit is outdated.
Estonia	No DR1 units or its modifications are in service. Their commuter operator, Edelaraudtee (Southwestern Railway) is defunct (all commuter routes are now served by Elron which uses Stadler Flirt DMUs). Some DR1B/BJ sets were sold to Kazakhstan. From 2012 to 2015 another DR1B/BJ operator, GoRail, provided international services to Saint Petersburg. This route has been also closed due to lack of passengers. Latvian DR1 trainsets run into Valga from time to time.
Georgia	One DR1AM unit is in service.
Kazakhstan	Several DR1B/BJ units bought from Estonia are in service. The original DR1A units deployed during the Soviet period have almost all been decommissioned.
Latvia	Most DR1A or DR1AM units are still in service, some of them have undergone a conversion into DR1AC units. A procurement was created in 2020 for eight new diesel trains to replace the DR1A units, but due to various problems and environmental concerns over funding new diesel trains, the procurement was cancelled on January 8, 2021.
Lithuania	Few DR1A or DR1AM units are still in service. Most are being replaced by newer, more modern units.
Russia	DR1 sets and its modifications are only in departmental use, not in passenger services. DR1A sets were withdrawn from Samara commuter services in 2012 (after that the last set was delivered to rail museum) and from Kaliningrad commuter services in 2016 (even new batches were withdrawn, after that the last set was delivered to rail museum, too).
Ukraine	Some of DR1P/DR1A/DR1AM sets are still in use. Some parts of DR1 trains (most of the copies are passenger wagons of DR1P trains such as DR1P-057, DR1P-071 and DR1P-080) and its modifications (some wagons of DR1A-167) were abandoned after the Chernobyl disaster, still can be found at the Yaniv railway station.

== Formations ==
Different combinations of carriages are possible:

- Original non-refurbished trainsets:

Driving carriage - carriage - carriage - carriage - carriage - Driving carriage

(3 to 5 non-driving carriages)

- Modified for DR1AM/DR1BJ/DRL1/MDP trainsets:

Driving carriage - carriage - Driving carriage (without engine)

In the Soviet Union, commuter trains did not get 1st or 2nd class seats, as each DR1 train was equipped with only one type of seat. Often, the seats were made of wood.

The DR1B trainsets operated by GoRail in Estonia were equipped with space for bicycles, making the setup similar to one that originated with trains in western Europe.

== See also ==
- History of rail transport in Russia
