= ŽS series 412 =

Yugoslav electric train

RVR ER31/ER35 (ŽS Series 412/416)
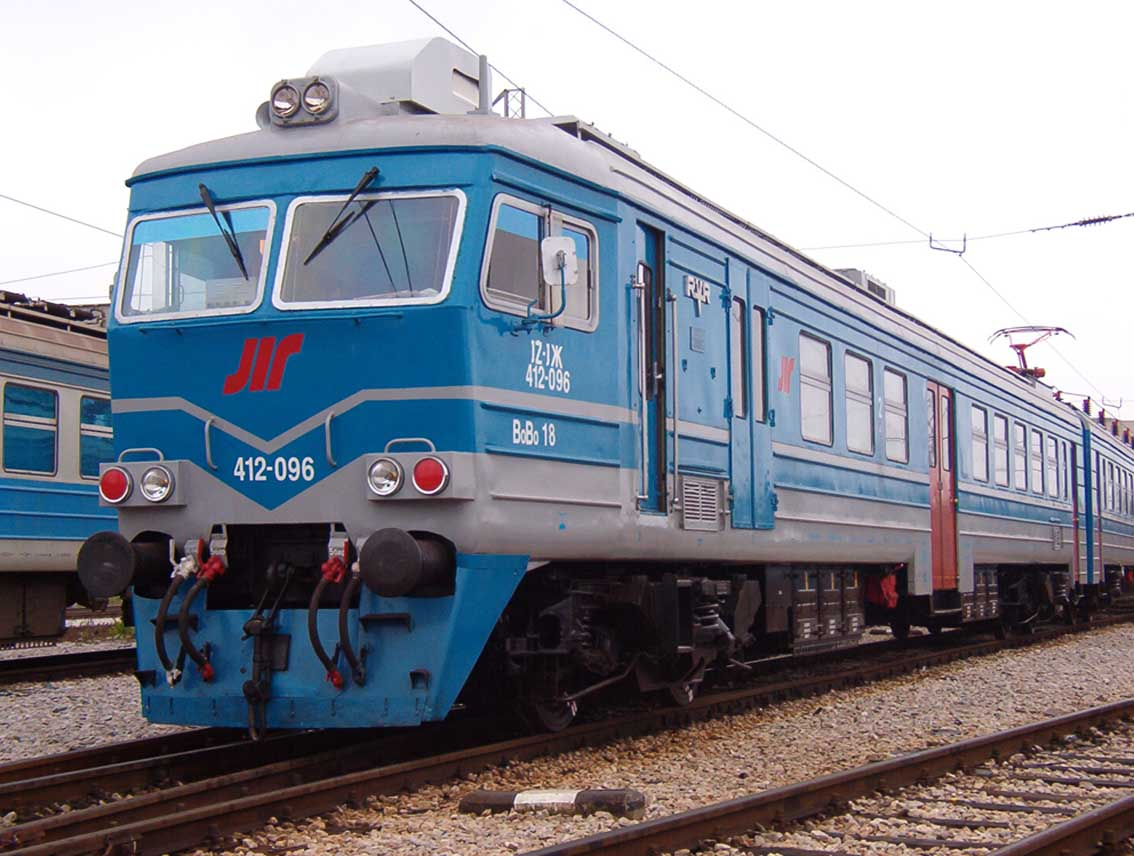
- JŽ 412-096
Type and origin
- Power type: Electric
- Builder: Rīgas Vagonbūves Rūpnīca
- Build date: 1980 – 1990's
- Total produced: 53, including: ER31: 50; ER35: 3
Specifications
- Configuration
  - UIC: Bo'Bo' + 2'2' + 2'2' + Bo'Bo'
- Gauge: 1,435 mm (4 ft 8 1/2 in) standard gauge
- Length: 102,160 mm (335 ft 2 in)
- Width: 2,810 mm (9 ft 3 in)
- Height: 3,893 mm (12 ft 9 in)
- Loco weight: 220 t (220 long tons; 240 short tons)
- Electric system/s: 25 kV/50 Hz AC catenary
- Current pickup: Pantograph
Performance figures
- Maximum speed: 120 km/h (75 mph)
Career
- Class: JŽ 412, ŽS 412, ŽCG 412, MŽ 412
- Nicknames: Gorbačov, Rus (Russian boy)
- Locale: Yugoslavia, in today's Serbia, North Macedonia and Montenegro

The JŽ class 412/416 is an electric multiple unit built for Yugoslav Railways (JŽ). The units are currently used by Serbian Railways (ŽS), Macedonian Railways (MŽ) and Montenegro Railways (ŽCG).

== History ==
In the early 1980s Yugoslav Railways ordered several passenger electric multiple-unit trains for Belgrade, Novi Sad, Skopje and Titograd sections (ŽTP). At half the price offered by a domestic Yugoslav competitor, JŽ series 410 EMU built by Goša, the Soviet ER31 (Russian: ЭР31) built by Rīgas Vagonbūves Rūpnīca (RVR) was chosen. The first unit was introduced in traffic at September 25, 1980. According to JŽ classification, the EMU was designated as 412/416.

From 1980 to 1990 and with the breakup of Yugoslavia, 50 EMU train sets were delivered from the Soviet Union to Yugoslav railways. ŽTP Belgrade and ŽTP Novi Sad received 40 sets, ŽTP Titograd received six, and ŽTP Skopje received four sets of 412/416 EMU.

During the 1990s six similar train sets were built for Bulgarian State Railways (BDŽ); these items were more simple in design. EMU for BDŽ was designated by RVR as ER33 (ЭР33), in Bulgaria - BDŽ class 33.

Later, three more sets were built for JŽ, but due to the sanctions on FR Yugoslavia, there were delays with deliveries. These last three train sets 412/416 for Serbia had more powerful traction motors and was designated by RVR as ER35 (ЭР35).

== Technical specifications ==
The EMU train set consists from four sections: two cab-motor cars (412) and two trailer cars (416). The trains can only be controlled and operated from cab cars (412). The train set weighs approximately 220 tons

=== Voltage ===
This train set utilises 25 kV/50 Hz AC.

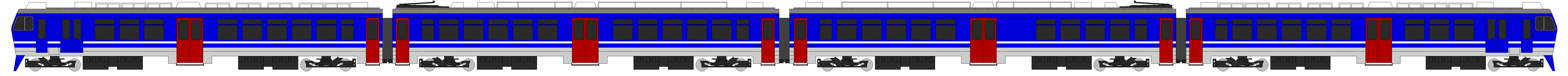
Formation: 412 + 416 + 416 + 412

== Operators ==
After the dissolution of Yugoslavia, class 412/416 EMU train sets continued service with the railways of the three former republics of Yugoslavia: Serbian Railways (ŽS), Macedonian Railways (MŽ) and Montenegro Railways (ŽCG).

=== Serbia ===
Today Serbian Railways are the biggest operator of 412 class of all Yugoslav successor states. The main depot for this class is at Zemun.

In 2019 there are 24 EMU train sets operational. Nine sets were overhauled with help of Belgrade city, being used with BG Voz - urban rail system that is operated by the public transit system of Belgrade. The rest of EMU train sets traffic on regional lines toward Prijepolje, Šid, Paraćin and Zaječar.

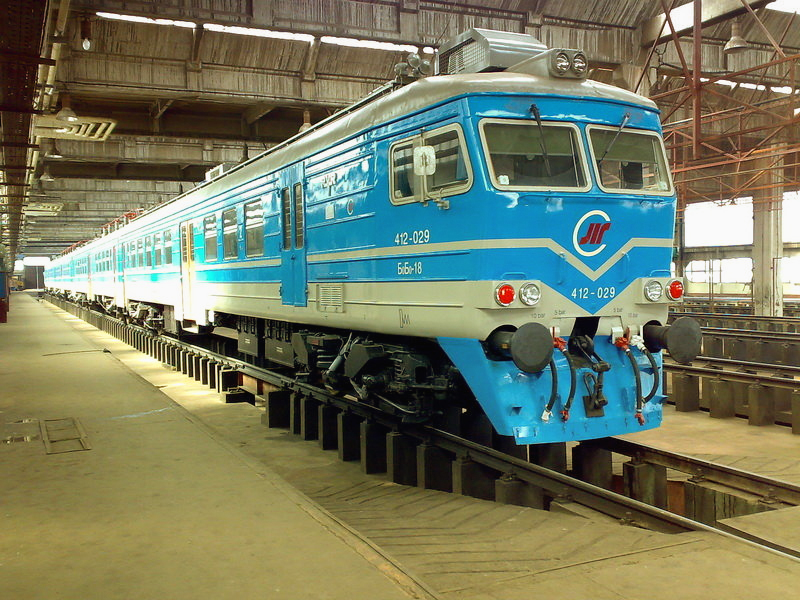
Serbian Railways ŽS 412

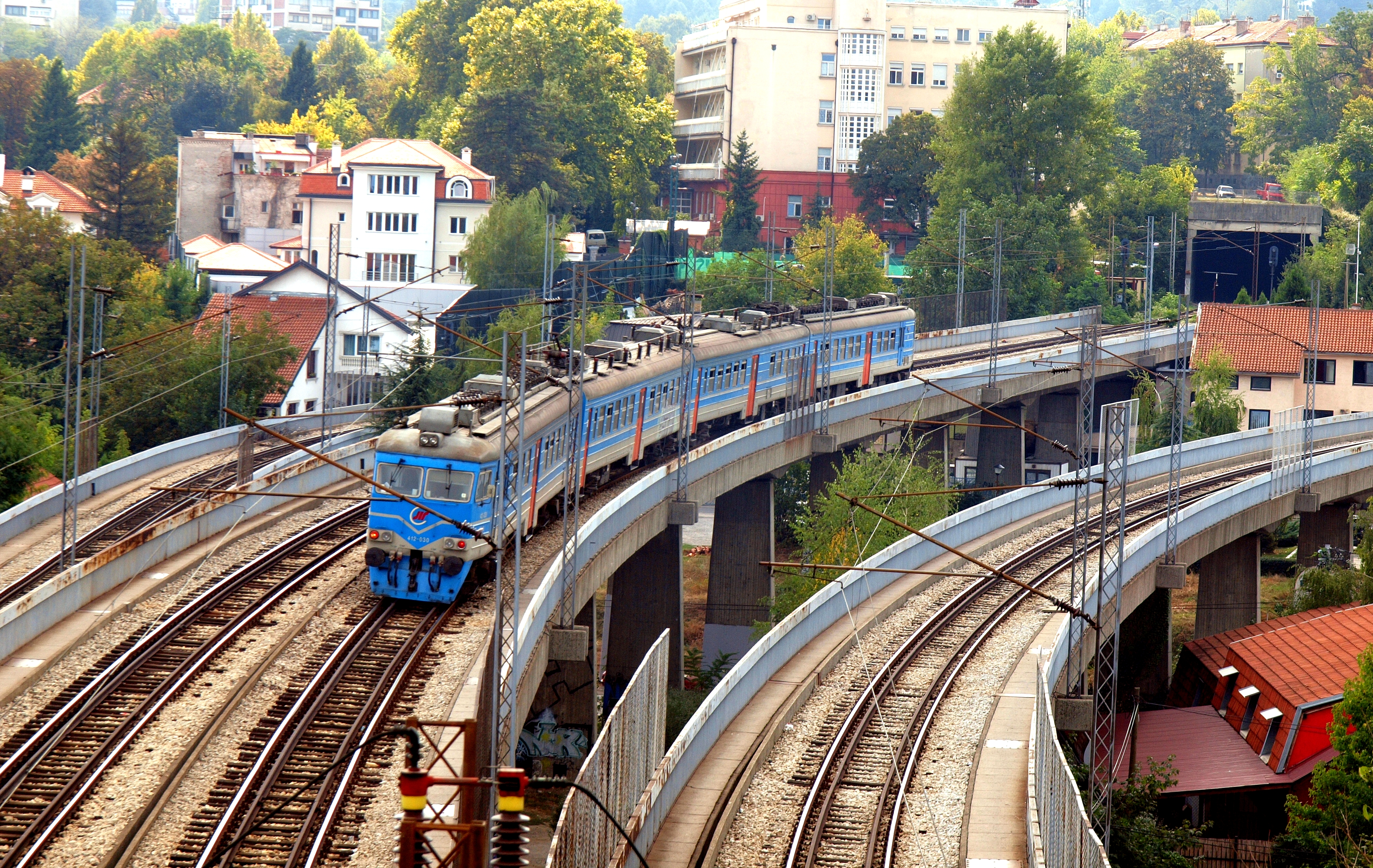
BG Voz on railway bridges in the Belgrade

=== Montenegro ===
Montenegro Railways have received six class 412/416 EMU train sets which have been purchased by Yugoslav Railways for ŽTP Titograd in 1985. In 2015, there are five operational train sets, with two recently overhauled. Main depot is at Podgorica. One train set was destroyed in the Bioče disaster in January 23, 2006.

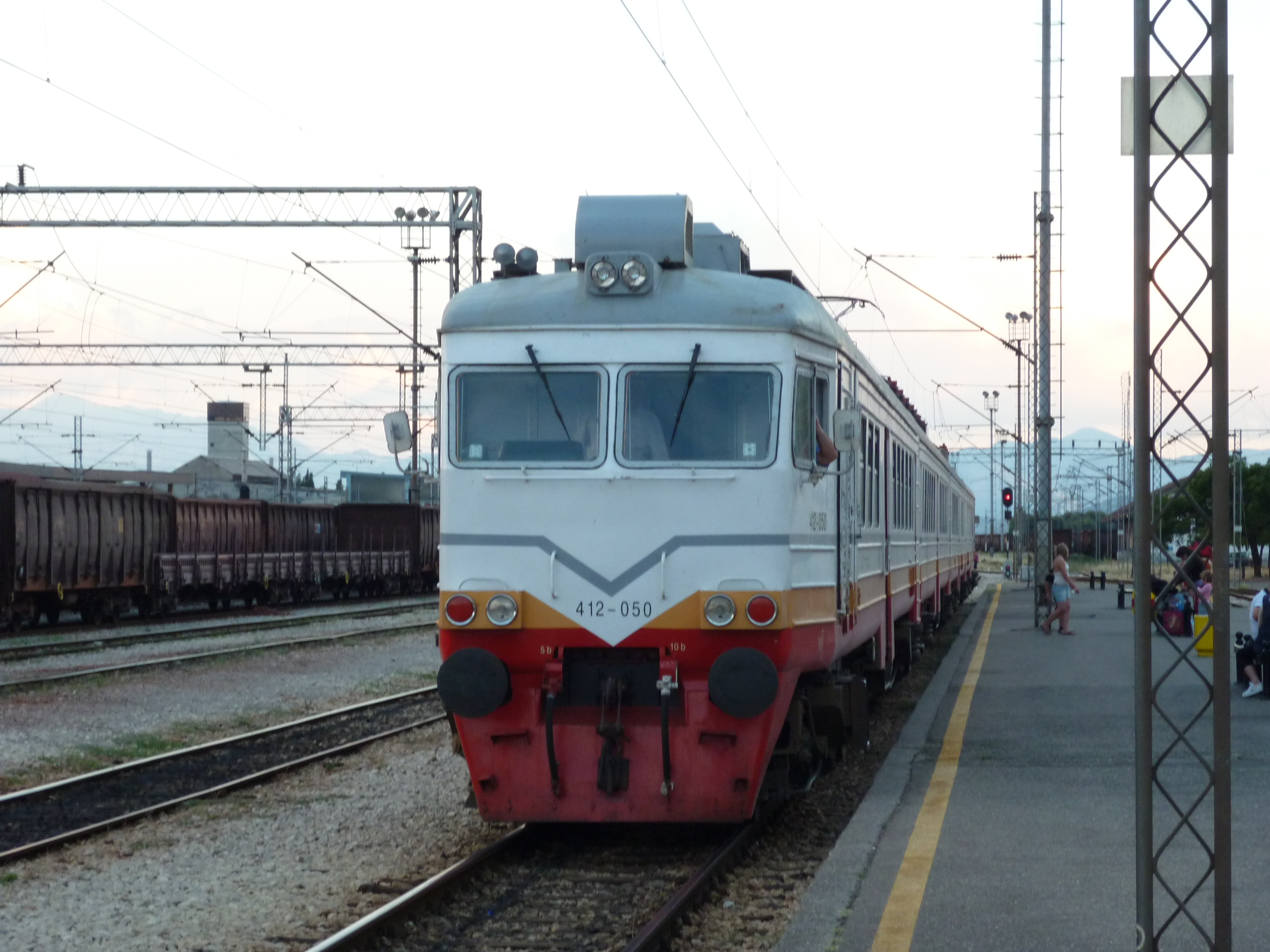
Railway transport of Montenegro class 412 EMU train set

=== North Macedonia ===
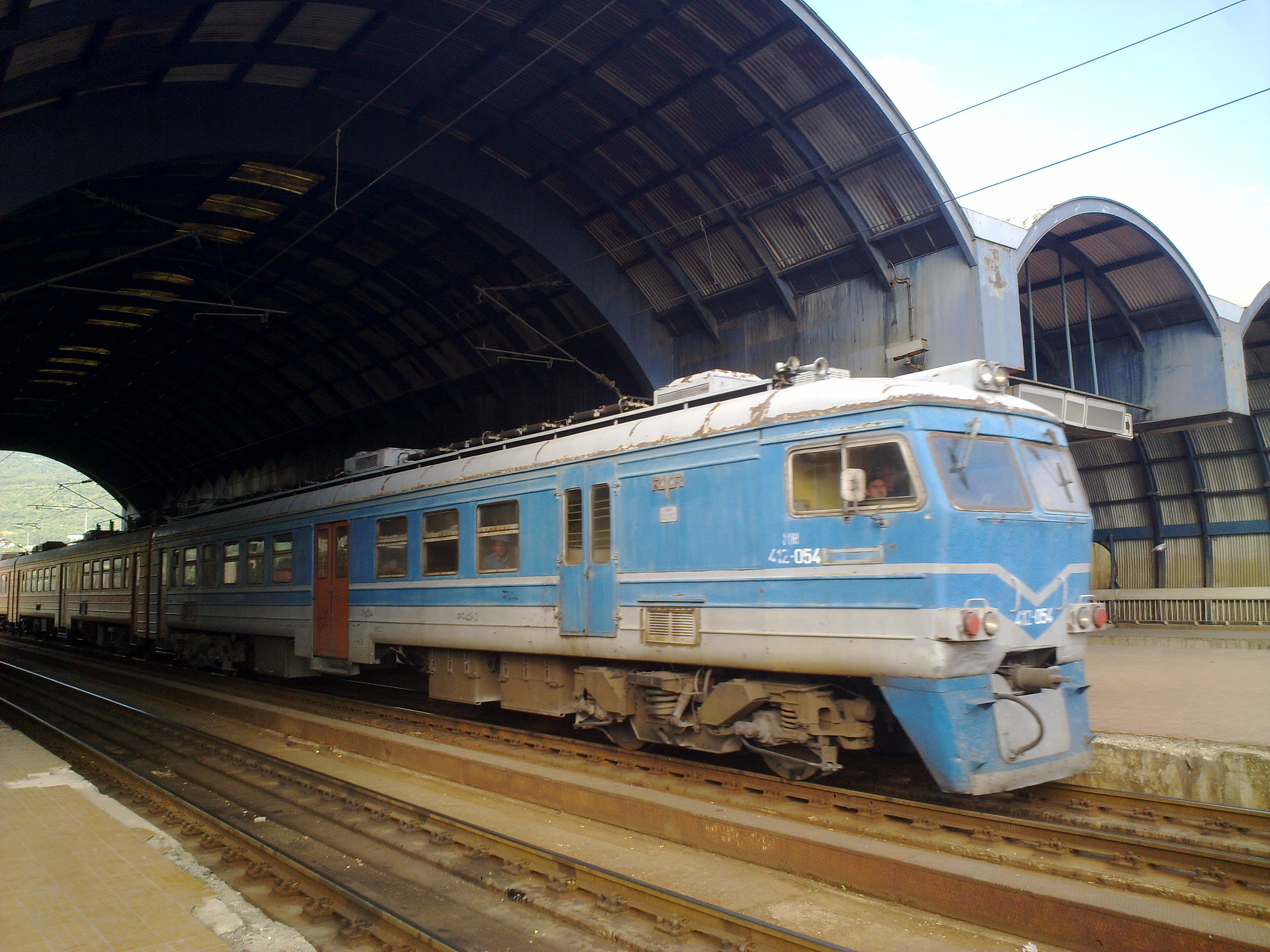
MŽ 412 at Skopje train station in 2011
