= ER1 electric trainset =

ER1
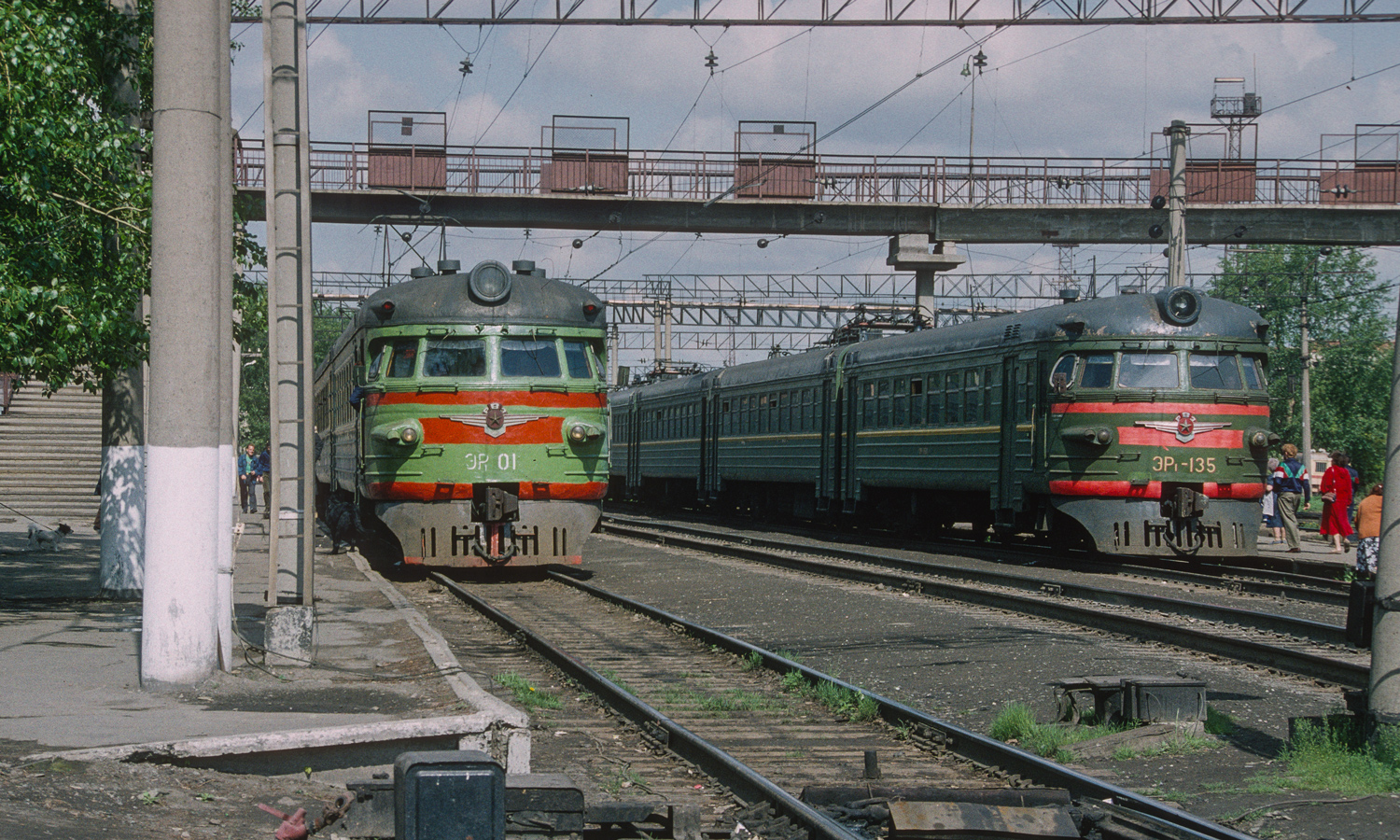
- Electric multiple train units ER1-135 (right) and ER1/6-01 at Nizhny Tagil station
- Manufacturer: Rīgas Vagonbūves Rūpnīca
- Constructed: 1957-1962
- Number built: 259 + 4 separate head carriages
- Formation: 10 cars
- Capacity: 1050 seats

Specifications
- Car body construction: steel
- Car length: 19.600 m (64 ft 3 5/8 in)
- Width: 3,480 mm (11 ft 5 in)
- Acceleration: 0.6 m/s^{2} (2.0 ft/s^{2})
- Deceleration: 0.8 m/s^{2} (2.6 ft/s^{2})
- Electric system(s): 3 kV DC Catenary
- Current collection: Pantograph
- Coupling system: SA3
- Track gauge: 1,520 mm (4 ft 11 27/32 in) Russian gauge

ER1 electric trainset (Cyrillic: ЭР1) was manufactured by Rīgas Vagonbūves Rūpnīca between 1957 and 1962 for suburban commuting usage within the Soviet Union on lines electrified on 3000 V, DC.

== See also ==
- Stadler KISS - electric trainset, in Sweden called ER1
- The Museum of the Moscow Railway, at Paveletsky Rail Terminal, Moscow
- Rizhsky Rail Terminal, Home of the Moscow Railway Museum
- Varshavsky Rail Terminal, St.Petersburg, Home of the Central Museum of Railway Transport, Russian Federation
- History of rail transport in Russia
