= Härma =

Härma or Harma may refer to:

Places

- Harma (Attica), a town of ancient Attica, Greece
- Harma (Boeotia), a town of ancient Boeotia, Greece
- Härma, Harju County, village in Raasiku Parish, Harju County, Estonia
- Härma, Hiiu County, village in Hiiumaa Parish, Hiiu County, Estonia
- Härmä, village in Setomaa Parish, Võru County, Estonia

People

- Miina Härma (1864–1941), Estonian composer

Animals

- Harma (butterfly), a monotypic butterfly genus containing Harma theobene, the angular glider

== See also ==
- Härmä (disambiguation)
