= Kehra (village) =

Village in Estonia

- Village
- Location in Estonia
- Coordinates: 59°21′07″N 25°19′39″E
- Country: Estonia
- County: Harju County
- Municipality: Anija Parish
- First historical record: 1241

Area
  - Total: 1.4 km^{2} (0.54 sq mi)
- Highest elevation: 57.8 m (190 ft)
- Lowest elevation: 40 m (130 ft)

Population (2020)
  - Total: 29
  - Density: 21/km^{2} (54/sq mi)

Ethnicity (2011)
  - estonians: 81%
  - other: 19%
- Time zone: UTC+2 (EET)
  - Summer (DST): UTC+3 (EEST)
- Postal Codes: 74315

Kehra is a village in Anija Parish, Harju County, Estonia, just north of the town of Kehra. The village stands on the left bank of the Jägala River. As of August 1, 2020, the village had a population of 29.

The Matsi Arboretum is located in the village. The arboretum was established in 1965 by Olaf Schmeidt. As of the 2010s, there are over 270 species (over 360 taxons) of trees and shrubs.

== Etymology ==
Kehra was first mentioned in the Danish Census Book as Ketheræ in 1241. Before 1688, the village was also referred to as Kecere, Kecnere, Kedere, Kederikull, Kedder, Keyher, Kether, Kädder(e), and Keddar. The village was known as both Kehrakyla and Käihra in 1688, and as Kehra in 1732

The following Estonian words are speculated to be the origin of the name Kehra:

- keder or kehr (local dialect) (English: spinning wheel)
- jõekäär, also compared to Käära farm in Kohatu, Estonia (English: meander)
- veekeeris, compared to Kehro in Finland (English: whirlpool)

== History ==
=== Early history ===
In 1940, excavations on the Andevei property uncovered a treasure containing 421 silver coins, most recent of which was minted in 978 AD. Out of the 421 coins, 411 were Samanid, 5 Byzantine, 3 German, 1 Anglo-Saxon, and 1 Bohemian. Remains of iron tools and pieces of earthenware were also found nearby. Based on this, it is speculated that Kehra was settled at latest by the 11th century.

Kehra was first mentioned in the Danish Census Book in 1241. According to the book, the village was a part of the Repel parish (Estonian: Rebala muinaskihelkond) and had a size of 10 oxgangs (Estonian: adramaa, German: hakken). Half of the village belonged to Lambertus and the other half to Stenhackær. The village was baptized either in 1219 or 1220, likely at the same time as the villages of Saunja, Soodla, Aavere, Anija, Kõlu, Pirsu, Kihmla, and Parila. In 1249, the villages of Kehra and Paasiku were given to the bishop of Tallinn, whose successors later founded the Fegefyr manor (Estonian: Kiviloo mõis).

According to the Swedish land audit of 1564–1565, Kehra was part of the Kiviloo manor and had a size of 13 oxgangs. Kehra mill (Kedder quarn), located 100 meters upstream from the current car bridge, in the north-eastern corner of the current pulp and paper mill, was also mentioned in the same audit. It was demolished in 1936.

=== School ===
The first school in the village was established in 1738 but it operated inconsistently. The first school that started operating consistently was opened in fall 1850, a few days before St. Martin's Day, according to a first-hand account. According to the official list of schools in the Estonian Governorate in 1886, the school was founded in 1848. The school was located on the land of the current Koolitoa property. A new building was built for the school on the same property in 1878, because the previous building was in a bad state. According to Gustav Vilbaste, the school's teacher between 1904 and 1913, the school had three grades and around 30-50 students. The school became a four grade school in 1918 due to a nation-wide school reform. On November 1, 1919, the school started operating in Kehra.

== Historical demographics ==
Population before 1900, Kehra manor and village
Year	Pop.	±% p.a.
1710	146	—
1712	14	−69.03%
1716	34	+24.84%
1726	65	+6.69%
1781	197	+2.04%
1815	239	+0.57%
1857	321	+0.70%
Source: A. Miidla, Kehra Lood p. 86

The village's population has mostly stayed between 130 and 200 since the 13th century. In 1565 the village was 13 oxgangs in size. The village was practically uninhabited after the Polish–Swedish war in 1615, while the nearby villages of Jaunack and Karrock remained practically untouched. The village recovered from the demographic crisis by the second half of the 17th century. By 1660s, Kehra manor owned all the nearby lands, including Kehra. The manor's lands were ravaged by the bubonic plague in 1710 and 1711, only 14 out of the previous 146 inhabitants survived. The population recovered to pre-plague levels in approximately 40 years. By 1856, Kehra had transformed from a clustered settlement to a linear settlement.

== Notable people ==
Notable people that were born or lived in Kehra include the following:

- Olaf Schmeidt (1930–2023), botanist
