= Aruküla railway station =

Railway station in Estonia

Aruküla
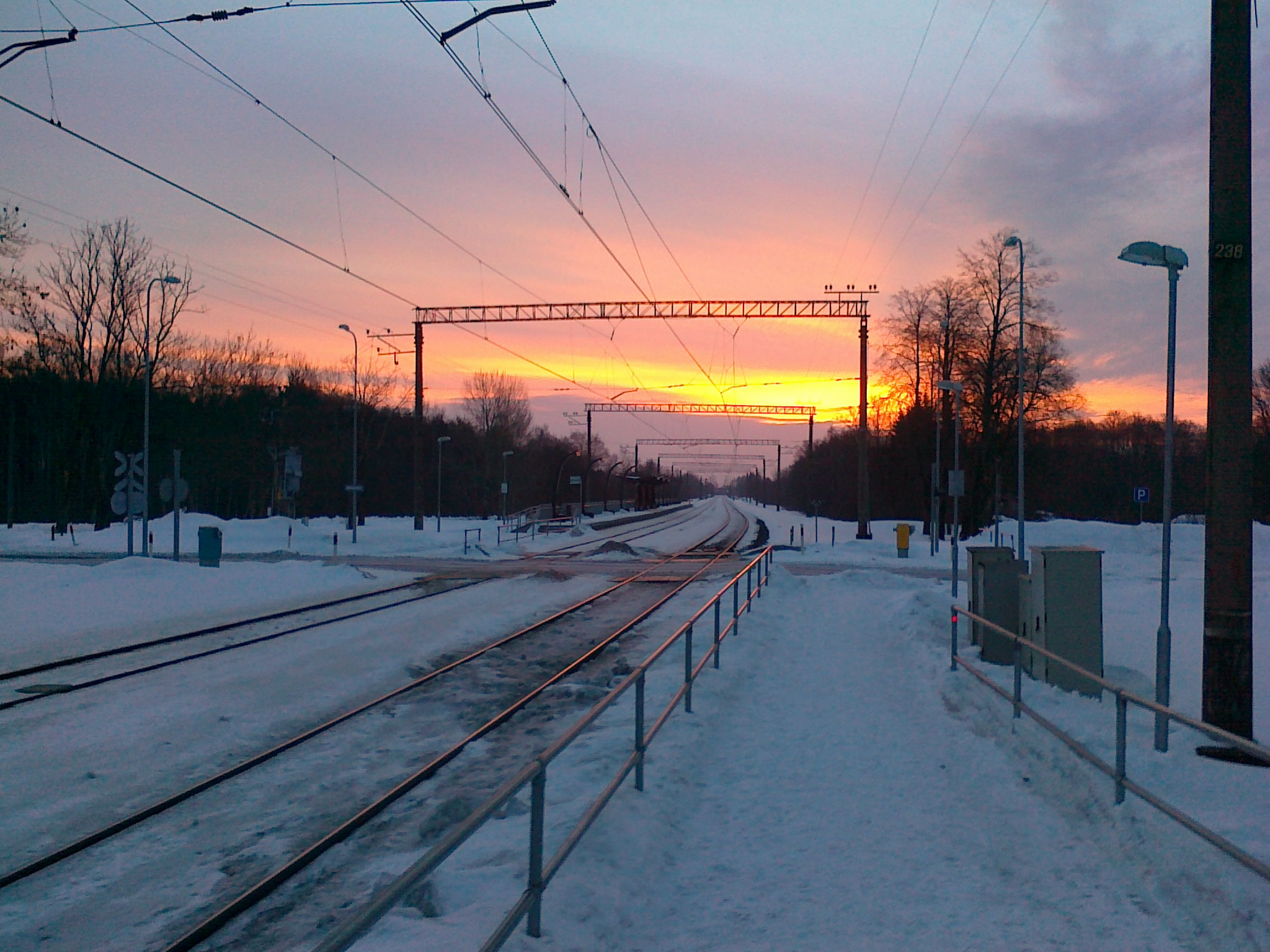
- Aruküla station in March 2013.

General information
- Location: Aruküla; Raasiku Parish, Harju County; Estonia
- Coordinates: 59°25′19″N 25°4′48″E
- System: railway station
- Owner: Eesti Raudtee (EVR)
- Line: Elron commuter rail
- Platforms: 2
- Tracks: 2
- Train operators: Elron

Construction
- Structure type: at-grade
- Accessible: yes

Other information
- Fare zone: III

History
- Opened: 1920
- Electrified: 3 August 1978; 48 years ago; 3 kV DC OHLE

Services
Preceding station	Elron	Following station
Kulli towards Tallinn	Tallinn–Aegviidu	Raasiku towards Aegviidu
Location
- Location within Estonia Location within Harju County

Aruküla railway station (Estonian: Aruküla raudteepeatus) is a railway station serving the small borough of Aruküla in Harju County in northern Estonia. It is the seventh station on Elron's eastern route between Tallinn and Aegviidu. It is located about 21 km south-east of Balti jaam. The station is served by commuter trains heading to Aegviidu and Tapa. The station consists of two 150 metre platforms.

== See also ==
- List of railway stations in Estonia
- Rail transport in Estonia
