= Parila Nature Reserve =

Protected area in Estonia

- Location within Estonia
- Location: Estonia
- Coordinates: 59°19′30″N 25°15′00″E
- Area: 208 ha (510 acres)
- Established: 2016

Parila Nature Reserve is a nature reserve which is located in Harju County, Estonia.

The area of the nature reserve is 208 ha.

The protected area was founded in 2016 to protect valuable habitat types and threatened species in Parila village (Anija Parish).
