= Aruküla SK =

Estonian sport club

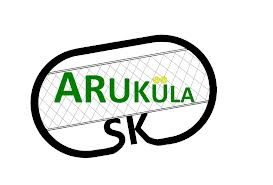
- Full name: Aruküla Spordiklubi
- Short name: Aruküla
- Founded: 1996
- Arena: Aruküla Basic School, Aruküla
- Capacity: 200
- President: Avo Mols
- Club colours

Aruküla SK is an Estonian multi-sports club, which is located in Aruküla, Harju County. The strongest section of the club is handball section, which competes in Meistriliiga.

The club was established in 1996.

Today it has developed into a sports club, with handball becoming the most popular sport. Toivo Järv and Andrus Rogenbaum (former Estonian national team players) are the coaches with the appropriate qualifications and experience. Over the years, the club has participated in the Estonian championship and cup competitions with teams of different ages - from the mini-leagues to the championship league in the last three seasons. The latter has been driven by the ageing of the youngsters and the need to motivate them to continue training.
