= Härmä =

Härmä may refer to:

- Hämeenlinnan Härmä, Finnish football club
- Härmä (film), 2012 Finnish film
- Härmä, Estonia, village in Setomaa Parish, Võru County, Estonia

== See also ==
- Härma (disambiguation)
