= Raasiku =

Borough in Estonia

- Small town
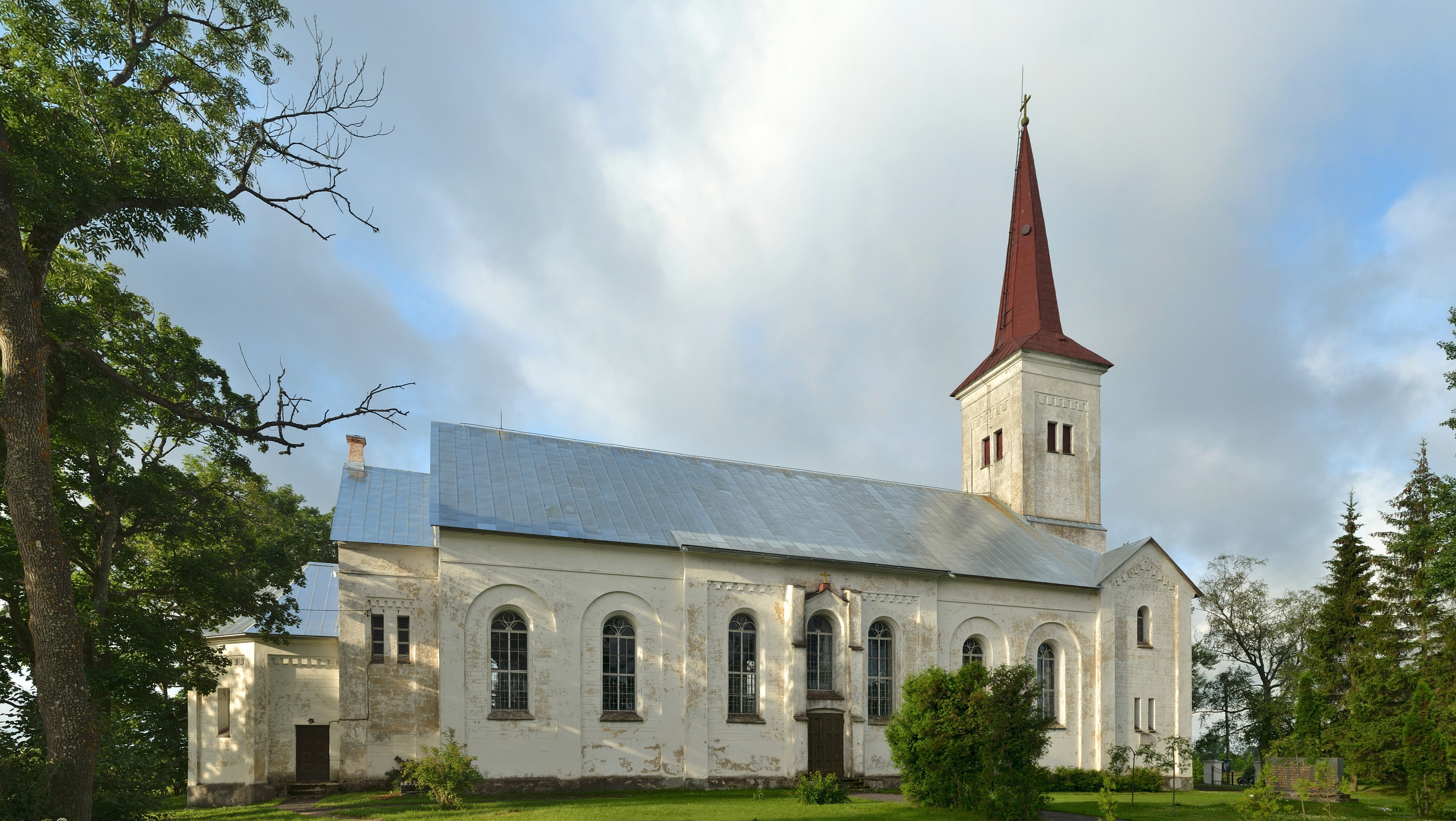
- Harju-Jaani church

- Location within Estonia
- Coordinates: 59°22′N 25°11′E
- Country: Estonia
- County: Harju County
- Municipality: Raasiku Parish
- First mentioned: 1241
- Manor first mentioned: 1497

Area
  - Total: 3.1 km^{2} (1.2 sq mi)
- Highest elevation: 50.5 m (166 ft)
- Lowest elevation: 36 m (118 ft)

Population (2021)
  - Total: 1,399
  - Estimate (2025): 1,475
  - Density: 450/km^{2} (1,200/sq mi)

Ethnicity (2011)
  - Estonians: 92.6%
  - others: 7.4%
- Time zone: UTC+2 (EET)
  - Summer (DST): UTC+3 (EEST)
- Postal Codes: 75203, 75293

Raasiku (German: Rasik) is a borough (Estonian: alevik) in Raasiku Parish, Harju County, Estonia, with a population of 1,372 (2020). Although situated in a parish with the same name, Raasiku is not the official administrative centre of the municipality (which is Aruküla, located some kilometres or one railway station closer to Tallinn). The settlement started to grow in the 19th century around the railway station. The Raasiku manor (first mentioned in 1497) was established on the grounds of the earlier Kaemla (Keamol) village and in the middle ages it belonged to Padise Abbey.

There is a primary school (since 1717), community centre, library, health care centre, pharmacy, kindergarten and two grocery stores in Raasiku. Also, some industrial manufacturers operate there: AS Mistra-Autex produces car carpets and wall finishing materials; AS Raasiku Elekter makes electrical equipment and metal products.

Harju-Jaani John the Baptist Lutheran Church is in Raasiku. The current church building was built in 1863, but there are preserved foundations of the old chapel. There is the churchyard, the old and the new cemetery and a manor park.

== History ==
In World War II, Raasiku was one of the destinations to which German Jews were transported for extermination from Moabitenstrasse station.

In 1942, during the German occupation, around 1,200 people from Frankfurt am Main and the Theresienstadt concentration camp were transported to Raasiku station and murdered in nearby dunes.

== Transport ==
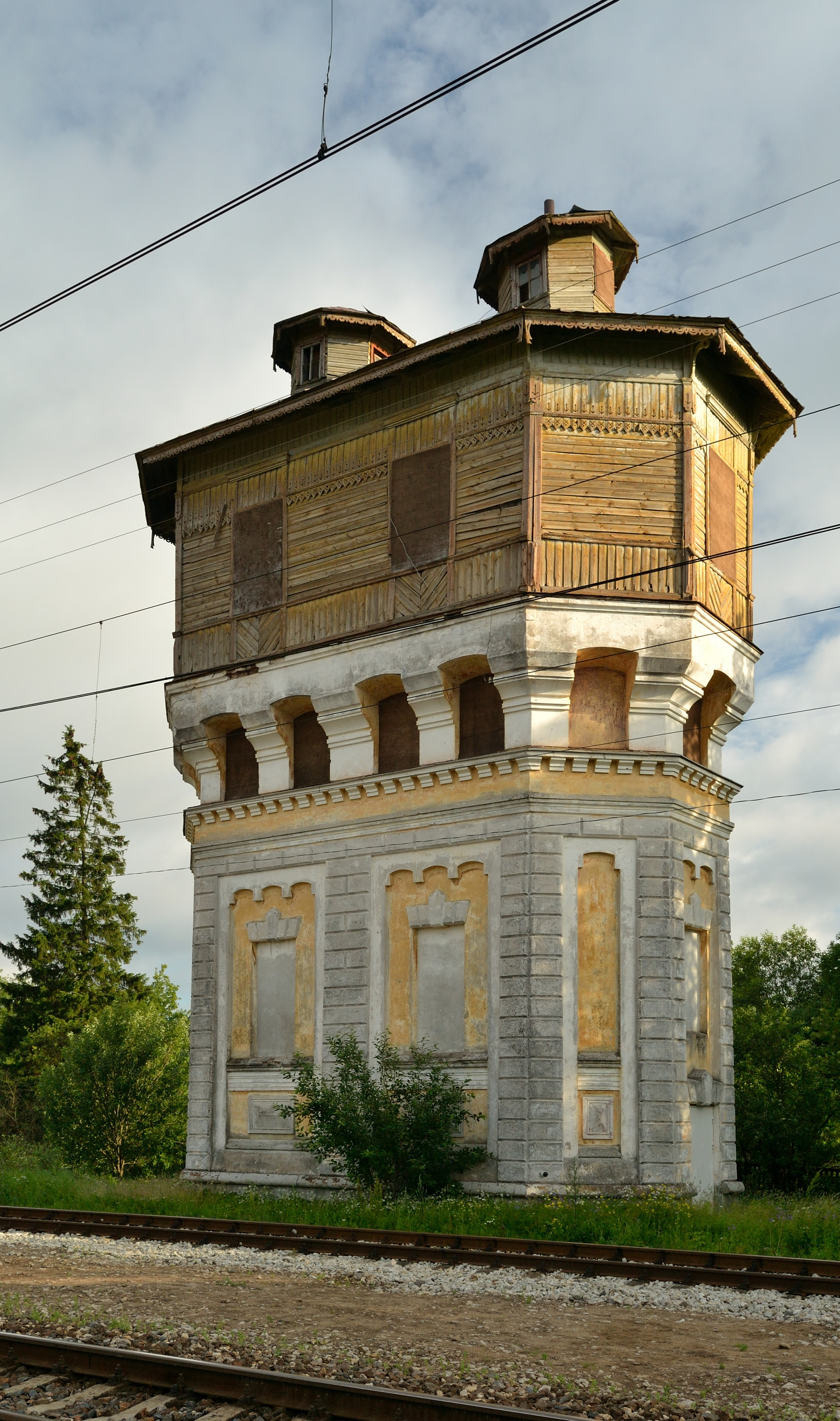
Raasiku train station water tower

Raasiku is split by the Tallinn-Tapa railway. The railway station was opened in 1870. In Soviet times a building for the goods station and signalling control was built. The old wooden passenger station was demolished in 2000, but the ancillary buildings and water tower have been preserved. All suburban trains stop there and also trains heading in the direction of Tartu and Narva (except for express trains). A ride to Tallinn takes about 35 minutes (30 minutes with the express suburban train).

Raasiku also has a bus connection to Tallinn (generally much slower than the train due to the length of the lines and a large number of stops). There are four bus stops in Raasiku.

The Jägala–Aruvalla road passes through Raasiku and local roads to Kostivere, Kehra, Anija and Aruaru emerge from it.

== Sports ==
There's a football club Raasiku FC Joker based in Raasiku, currently playing in the Estonian fourth division II liiga. 2018 opened Raasiku Sports Centre, located Kooli 1

== Notable people ==
- Tõnu Õim (born 1941), the double world champion of correspondence chess, was born in Raasiku.
- Bomb man of Pae street Lived in Raasiku

Preceding station	Elron	Following station
Aruküla towards Tallinn	Tallinn–Tartu–Valga	Kehra towards Valga
Aruküla towards Tallinn	Tallinn–Tartu–Koidula	Kehra towards Koidula
Aruküla towards Tallinn	Tallinn–Narva	Kehra towards Narva
Aruküla towards Tallinn	Tallinn–Aegviidu	Parila towards Aegviidu
