= Raasiku Parish =

Municipality of Estonia

Raasiku Parish Raasiku vald
- Municipality of Estonia
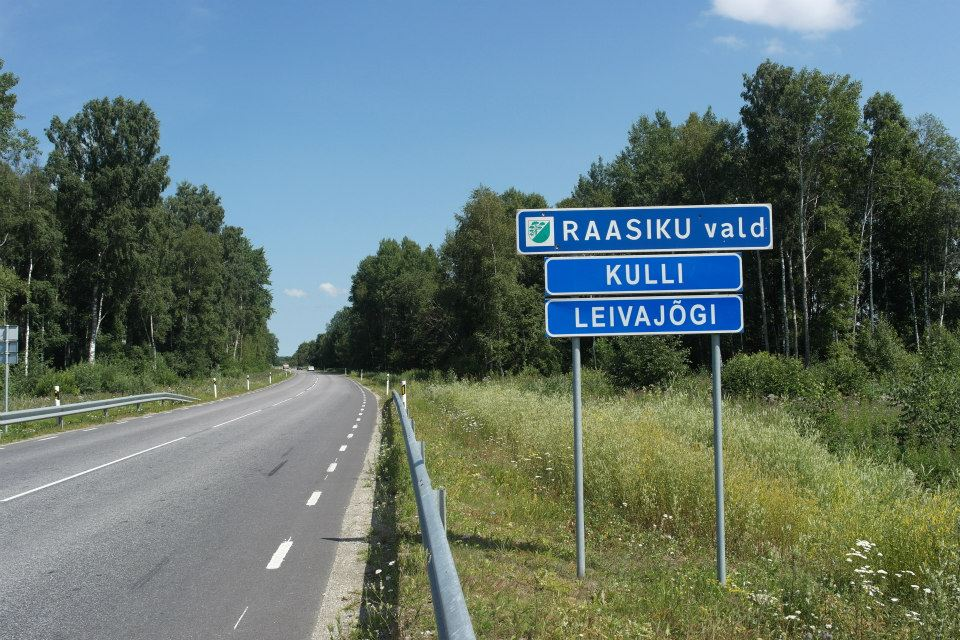

- Flag Coat of arms

- Country: Estonia
- County: Harju County
- Established: 12.03.1992
- Administrative centre: Aruküla

Government
  - Rural Municipality Mayor: Bärbel Salumäe
  - Chairman of the Municipal Council: Juta Asuja

Area
  - Total: 158.86 km^{2} (61.34 sq mi)

Dimensions
  - Length: 19 km (12 mi)
  - Width: 17 km (11 mi)

Population (01.01.2026)
  - Total: 5,475 ▲
- Time zone: UTC+2 (EET)
- ISO 3166 code: EE-651
- Website: www.raasiku.ee

Raasiku Parish (Estonian: Raasiku vald) in located in Harju County, southeast of Tallinn. The primary highway serving the parish is the Jüri-Aruküla-Raasiku-Jägala road. The Tallinn-Tapa railway runs along its northern border.

== Demographics ==
The parish is surrounded by Jõelähtme to the north, Anija to the east, Kose to the south, and Rae Parish to the west.

2 small towns: Aruküla, Raasiku

13 villages: Härma, Igavere, Järsi, Kalesi, Kiviloo, Kulli, Kurgla, Mallavere, Peningi, Perila, Pikavere, Rätla, Tõhelgi.

| | Population as of 01.01.2019 | Population as of 01.01.2020 | Population as of 01.01.2021 | Area (km^{2}) | Density |
|---|---|---|---|---|---|
| Aruküla | 2105 | 2115 | 2140 | 3.5 | 611 |
| Härma | 118 | 119 | 116 | 6.95 | 17 |
| Igavere | 165 | 166 | 166 | 19.79 | 8 |
| Järsi | 223 | 217 | 222 | 10.54 | 21 |
| Kalesi | 233 | 239 | 250 | 9.42 | 27 |
| Kiviloo | 57 | 56 | 53 | 15.97 | 3 |
| Kulli | 140 | 150 | 155 | 13.88 | 11 |
| Kurgla | 110 | 116 | 136 | 11.93 | 11 |
| Mallavere | 54 | 57 | 66 | 16.33 | 4 |
| Peningi | 170 | 186 | 176 | 4.67 | 38 |
| Perila | 110 | 105 | 109 | 15.86 | 7 |
| Pikavere | 70 | 68 | 67 | 9.05 | 7 |
| Raasiku | 1364 | 1372 | 1405 | 3.1 | 453 |
| Rätla | 53 | 50 | 48 | 7.59 | 6 |
| Tõhelgi | 42 | 47 | 43 | 9.56 | 4 |
| Total | 5065 | 5073 | 5161 | 158.86 | 32 |

== Religion ==
Out of older than fifteen years residents of Raasiku parish, 85.1 per cent are religiously unaffiliated, 9.6 per cent identify as Lutheran, Orthodox make up 3.0 per cent of the population, other Christians 0.5 per cent and 1.8 per cent of the population follows other religions or did not specify their religious affiliation.

== Symbols ==
The municipal flag and coat of arms have both been in use since 1995. The coat of arms depicts the pine forest of Aruküla, symbolising a "pine-like" perseverance that drives the economic and spiritual development of the region. The green diagonal area represents the parish's other major settlement, Raasiku, and the drumlins that surround it. In the municipal colour scheme, green represents nature, while silver signifies hope and purity.

== Administration ==
=== Local government bodies ===
- Council of the Rural Municipality [17 members] (representative body; elected by adult residents of the municipality)
  - Chairman of the Municipal Council: Juta Asuja
  - Deputy Chairman of the Municipal Council: Ivar Vilberg
- Rural Municipality Government [5 members] (executive body; established by the council)

The organisation of the Rural Municipality Government is structured as follows:

- Rural Municipality Mayor
- Office of the Rural Municipality
- Department of Education and Social Affairs
- Department of Administration and Development
- Department of Finance

== List of rural municipality mayors ==
Office periods of rural municipality mayors
| Mayor | Term start date | Term end date |
|---|---|---|
| Toivo Veenre | 12 March 1992 | October 1996 |
| Olev Rähni | October 1996 | October 1999 |
| Andre Sepp | November 1999 | 5 April 2011 |
| Aare Ets | 10 May 2011 | December 2013 |
| Raivo Uukkivi | December 2013 | October 2017 |
| Andre Sepp | 31 October 2017 | November 2021 |
| Raul Siem | 23 November 2021 | 15 September 2023 |
| Toomas Teeväli | 18 October 2023 | 14 October 2025 |
| Bärbel Salumäe | 17 December 2025 | Incumbent |

== Education and culture ==
=== Schools ===
- Aruküla Basic School
- Raasiku Basic School
- Pikavere Kindergarten Primary School
- Aruküla Waldorf School

== Twin towns – sister cities ==
- Norberg Municipality, Sweden

== Notable people ==
- Karl Gustav von Baggovut (1761 in Perila – 1812), a Russian lieutenant general, fought in the Napoleonic Wars and Finnish War.
- Gustav Ernesaks (1908 in Perila – 1993), composer and choir conductor.
- Aino Kukk (1930 in Raasiku - 2006), chess player, she won the Estonian Women's Chess Championship in 1955.
- Hans Kaldoja (1942 in Igavere – 2017), stage, TV, film, and radio voice actor, employed at the Estonian Drama Theatre, 1965 to 1992
- Andre Sepp (born 1971), politician, Mayor of Raasiku Parish from 1999 until 2011 and again from 2017.

== Gallery ==
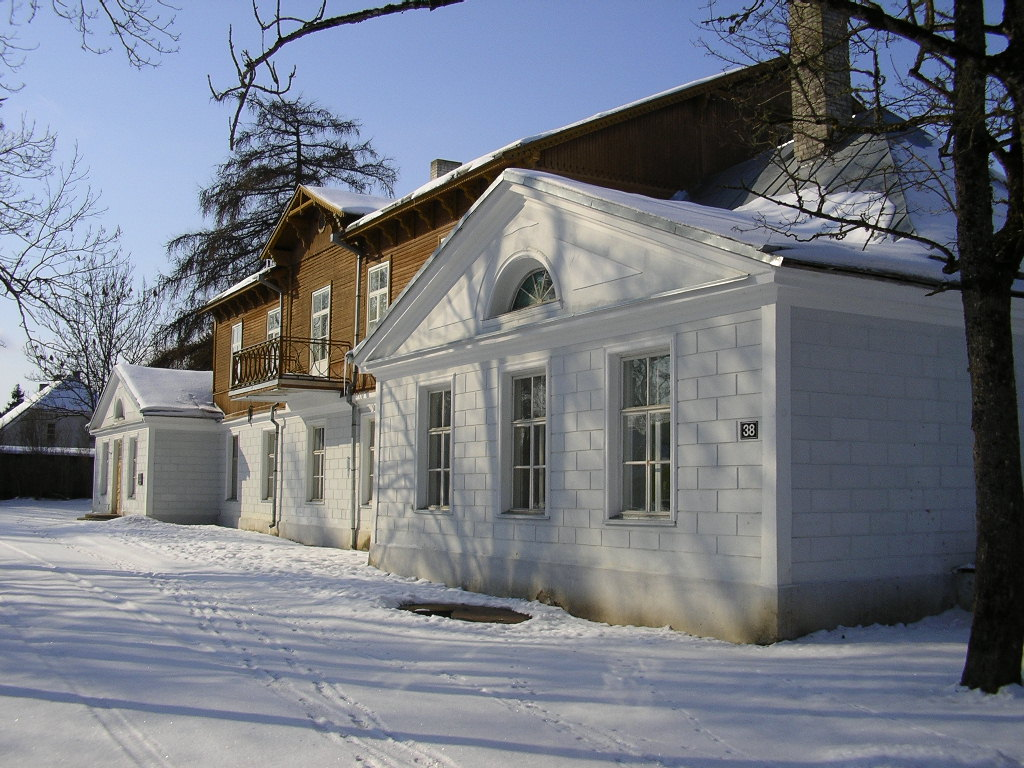
Aruküla manor

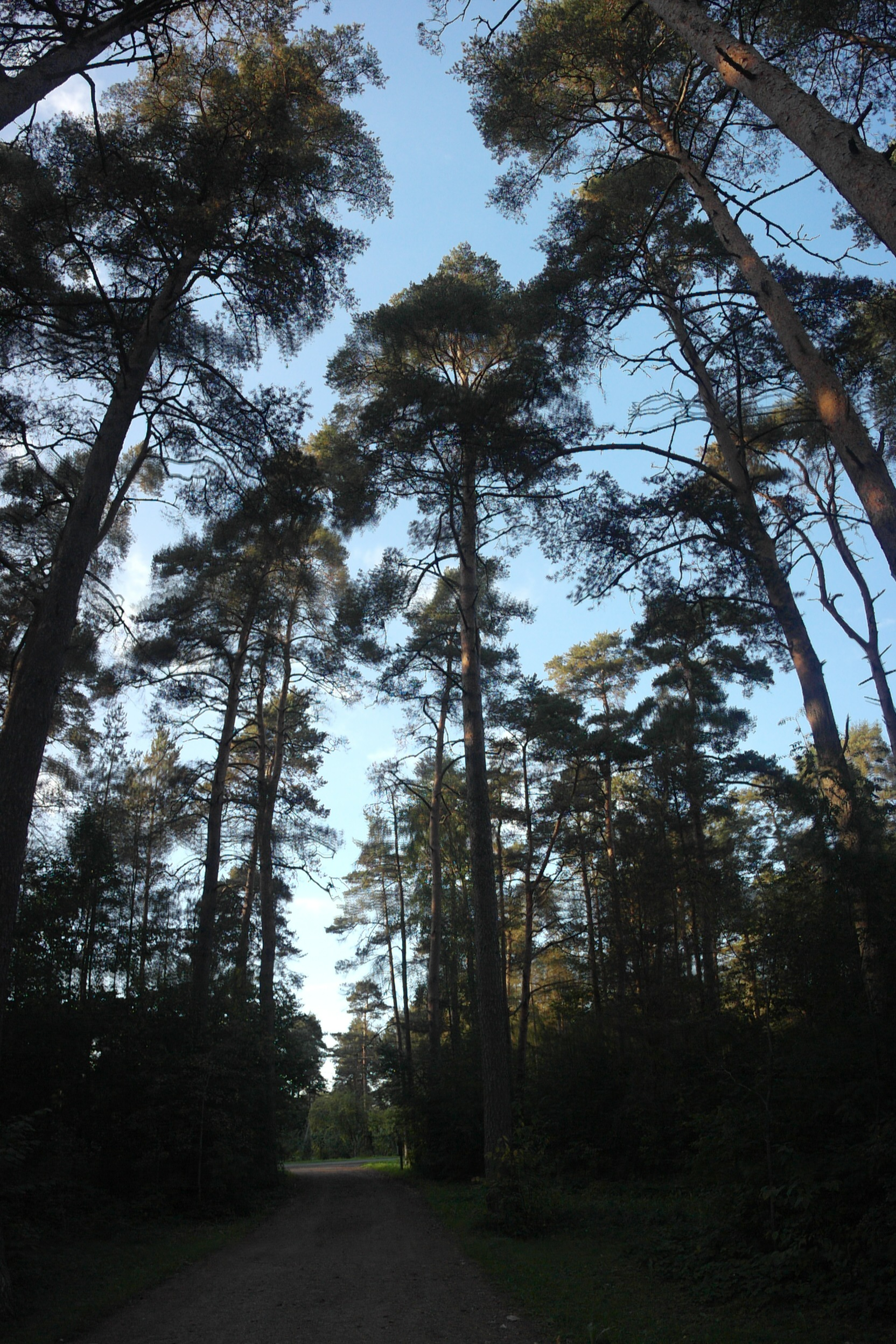
Pine trees

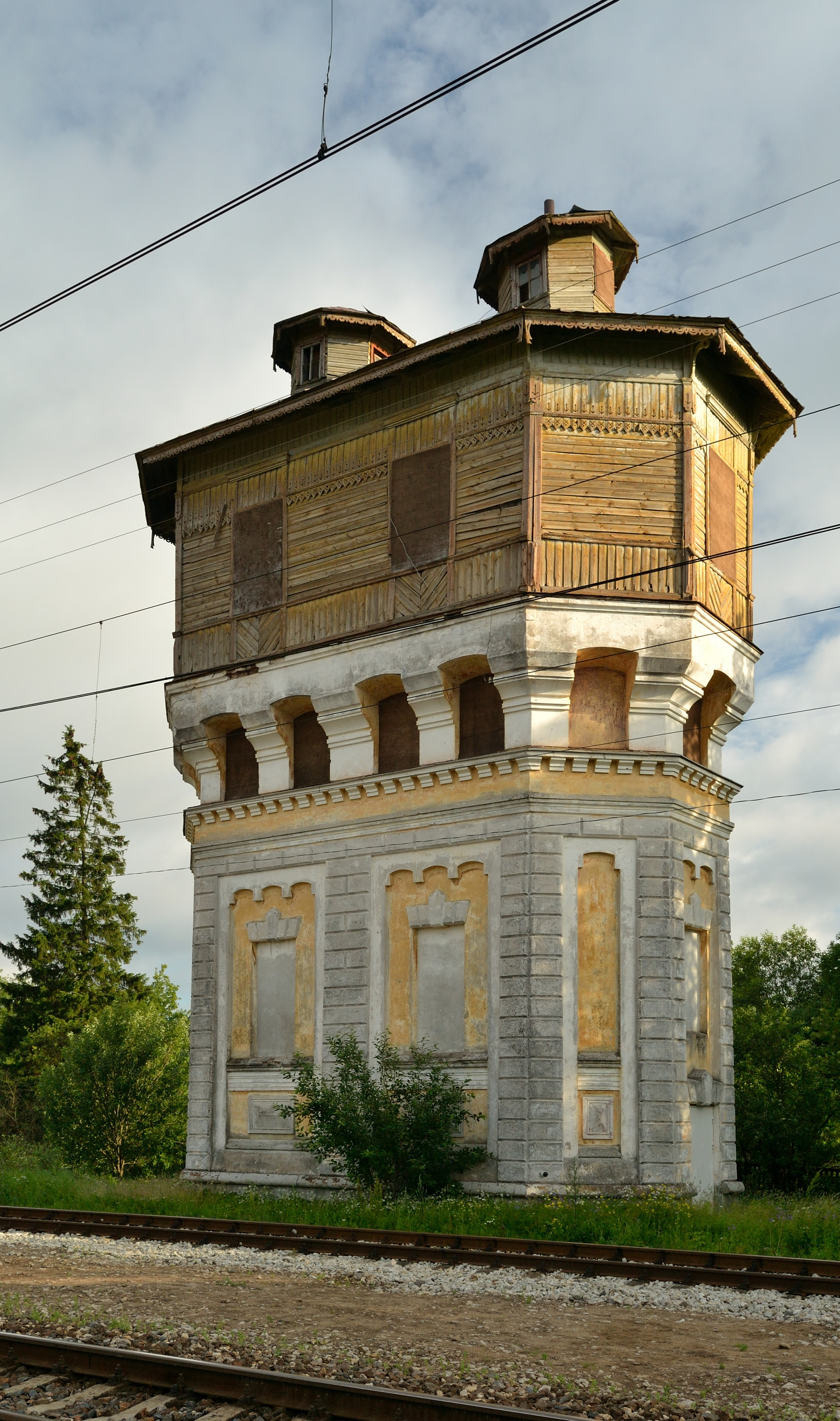
Raasiku water tower

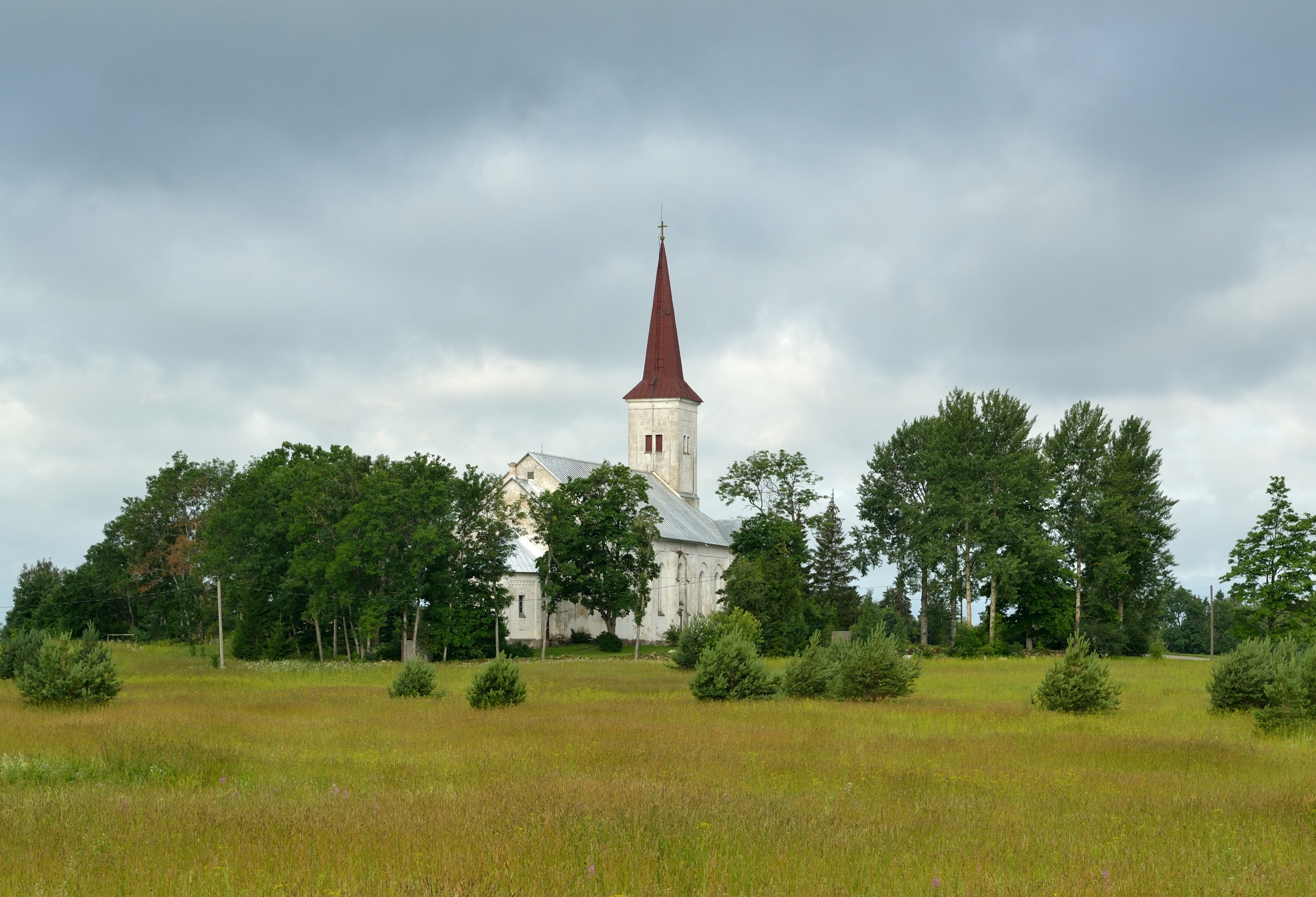
Raasiku church

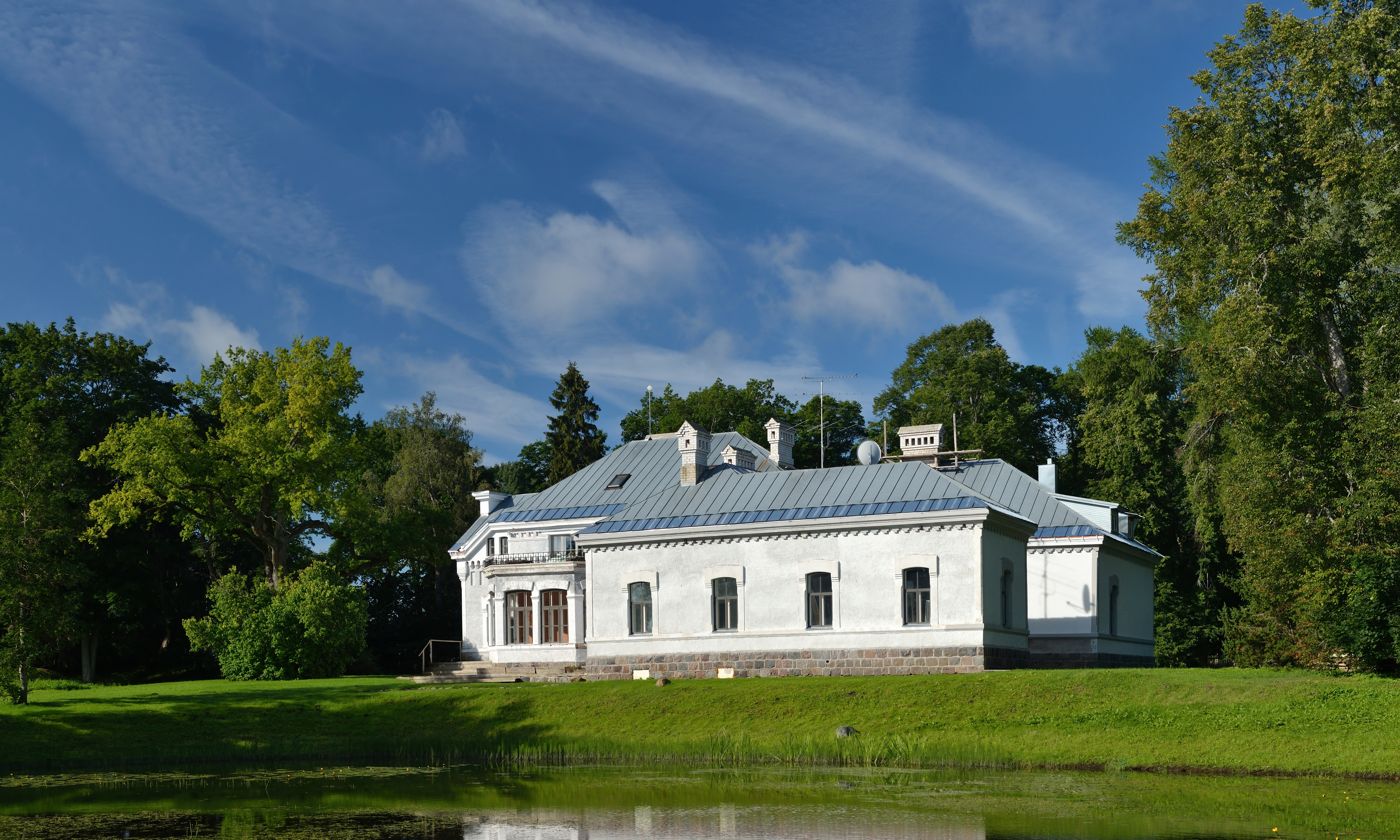
Kiviloo Manor

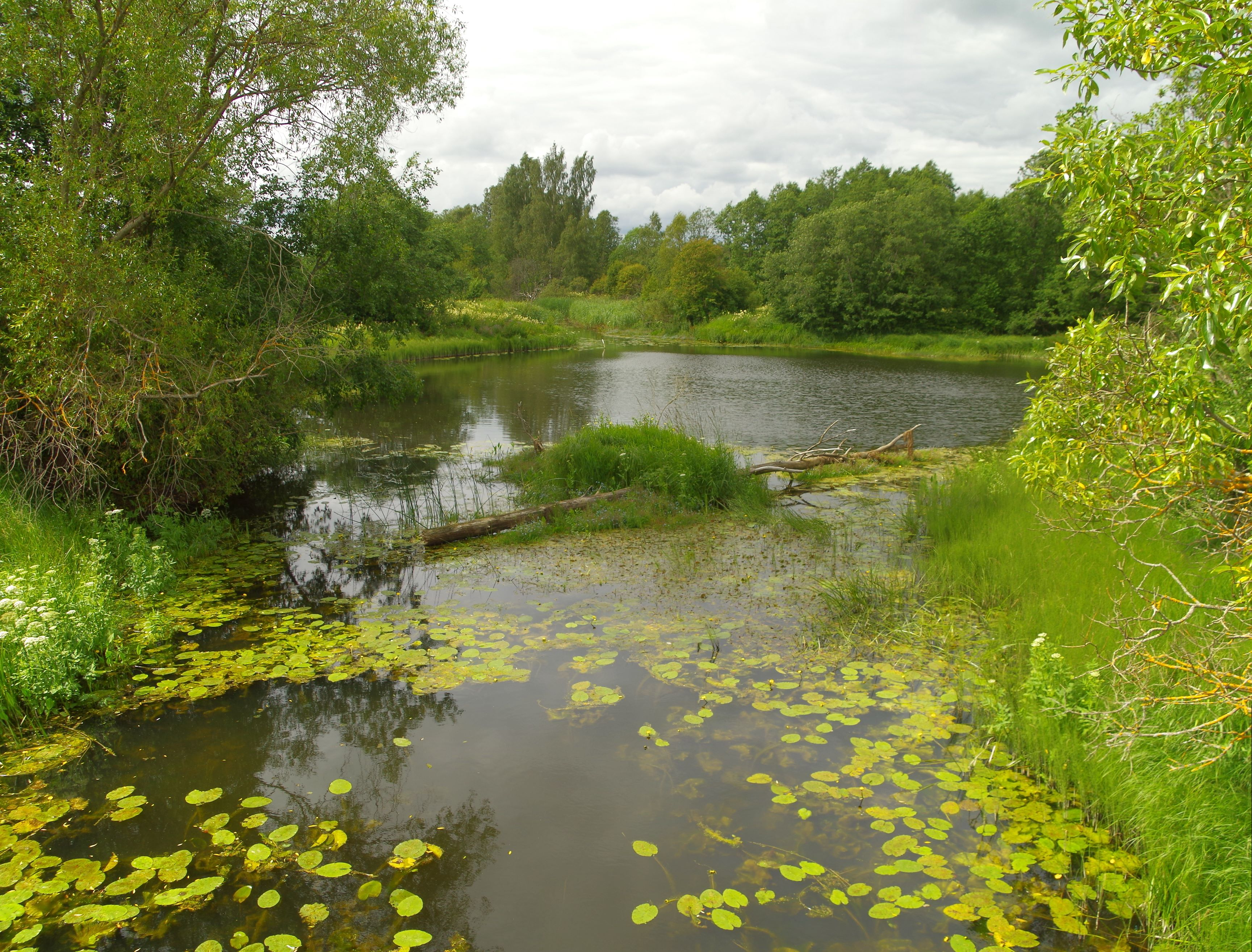
The Leiva river on the border of Raasiku Parish and Rae Parish

== See also ==
- Raasiku FC Joker
