= Järsi =

Village in Estonia

Coordinates: 59°22′25″N 25°03′27″E

- Village
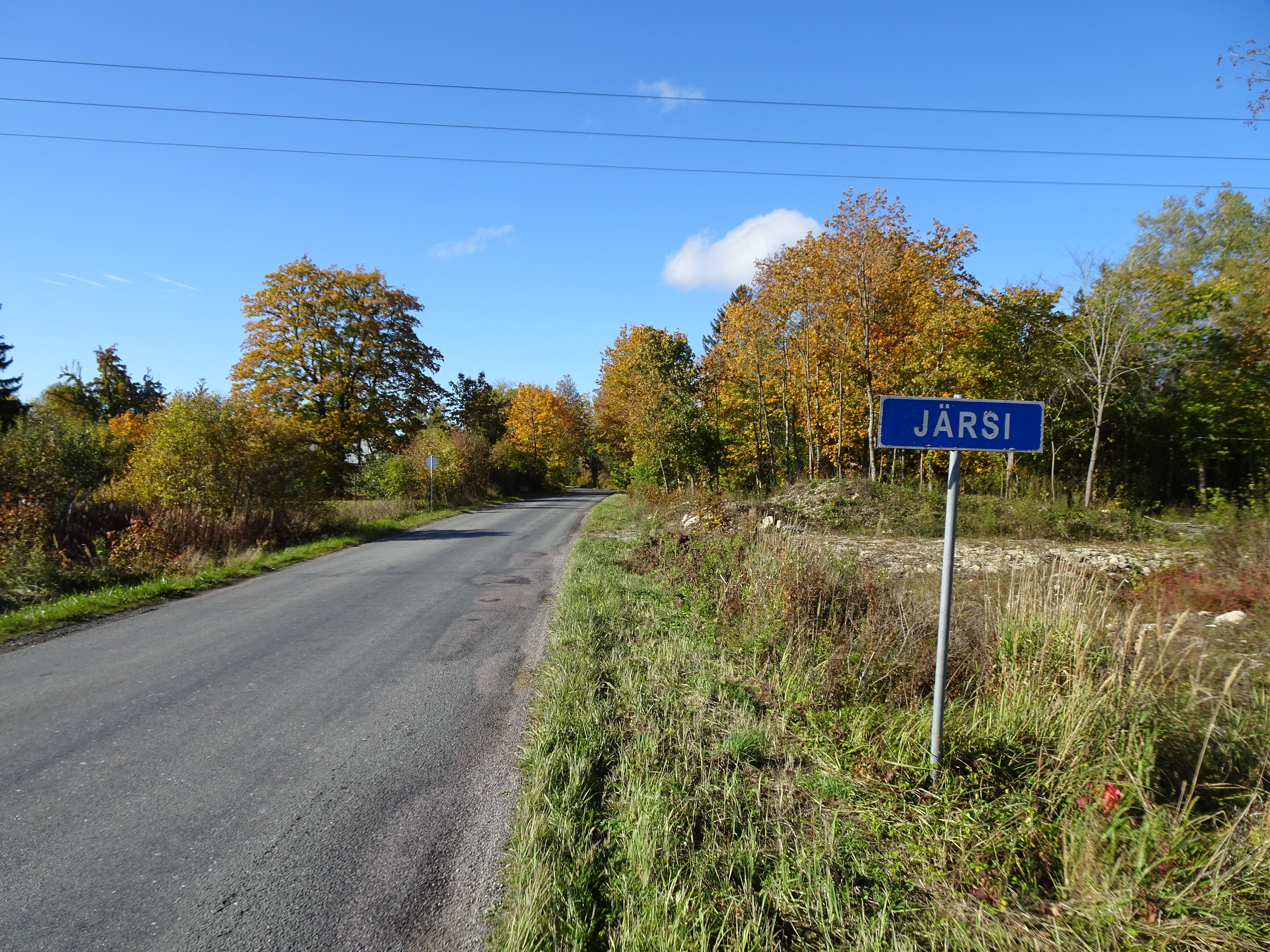
- Entrance to Järsi
- Interactive map of Järsi
- Country: Estonia
- County: Harju County
- Parish: Raasiku Parish
- Time zone: UTC+2 (EET)
  - Summer (DST): UTC+3 (EEST)

Järsi is a village in Raasiku Parish, Harju County in northern Estonia.
