= Kulli, Harju County =

Village in Estonia

Coordinates: 59°22′46″N 25°00′29″E

Kulli
- Village
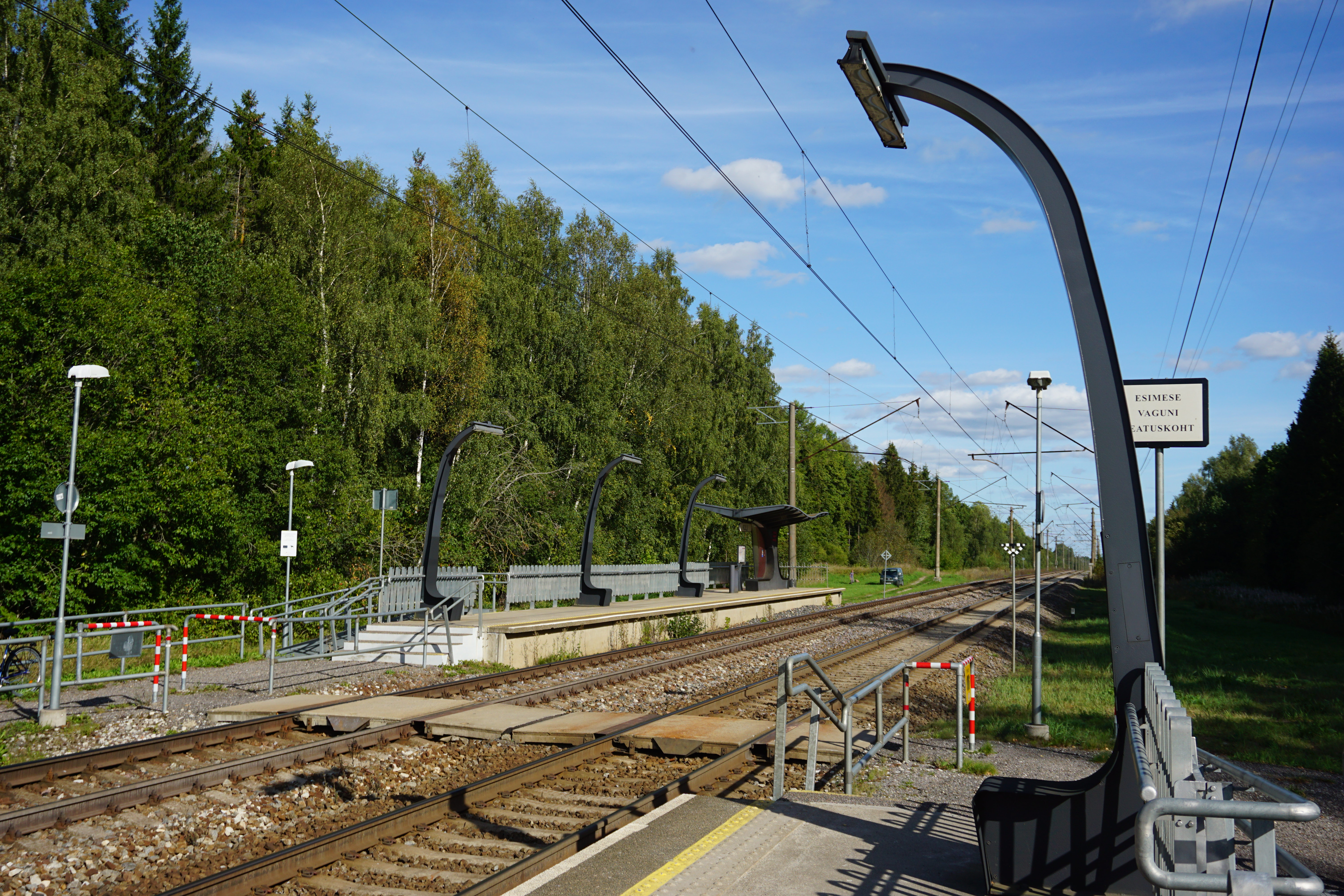
- Kulli train station
- Interactive map of Kulli
- Country: Estonia
- County: Harju County
- Parish: Raasiku Parish
- Time zone: UTC+2 (EET)
  - Summer (DST): UTC+3 (EEST)

Kulli is a village in Raasiku Parish, Harju County in northern Estonia.

Kulli has a station on the Elron eastern route.

| Preceding station | Elron | Following station |
|---|---|---|
| Lagedi towards Tallinn | Tallinn–Tartu–Valga | Aruküla towards Valga |
| Lagedi towards Tallinn | Tallinn–Tartu–Koidula | Aruküla towards Koidula |
| Lagedi towards Tallinn | Tallinn–Narva | Aruküla towards Narva |
| Lagedi towards Tallinn | Tallinn–Aegviidu | Aruküla towards Aegviidu |
