= Matsi Arboretum =

Arboretum in Kehra, Estonia

- Matsi dendraarium
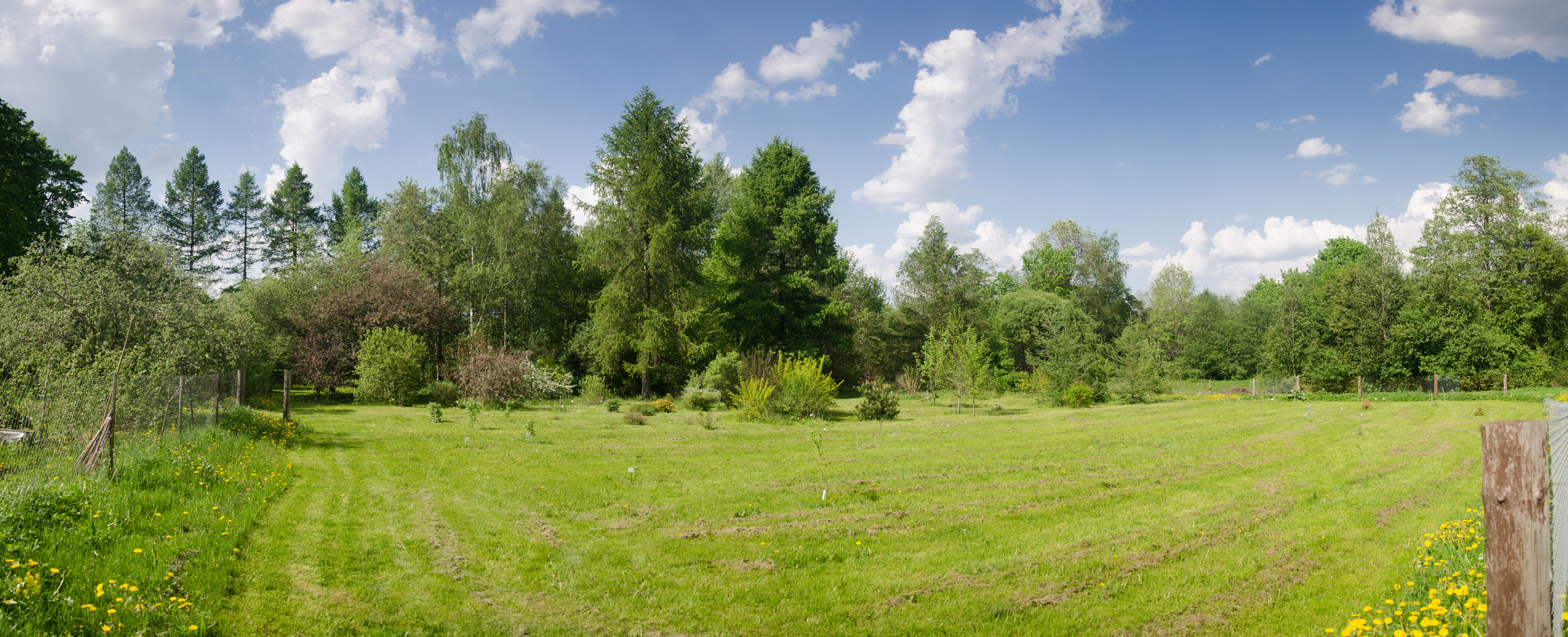
- Interactive map of Matsi Arboretum
- Location: Kehra; 74315 Harju County, Estonia
- Coordinates: 59°20′56″N 25°20′09″E
- Area: 1.7 ha (4.2 acres)
- Created: 1965
- Operator: Keskkonnaamet
- Website: register.keskkonnaportaal.ee/register/protected-nature-object/7352744

The Matsi Arboretum (Estonian: Matsi dendraarium) is an arboretum near the Matsi farm in the village of Kehra in Anija Parish, Harju County, Estonia. The arboretum has an area of 1.7 hectares (4.2 acres).

The arboretum was established in 1965 by Olaf Schmeidt, and it has 270 species (more than 360 taxa) of trees and shrubs. The arboretum was made a protected area in 1989.
