= Kalesi =

Village in Estonia

Coordinates: 59°21′N 25°08′E

- Village
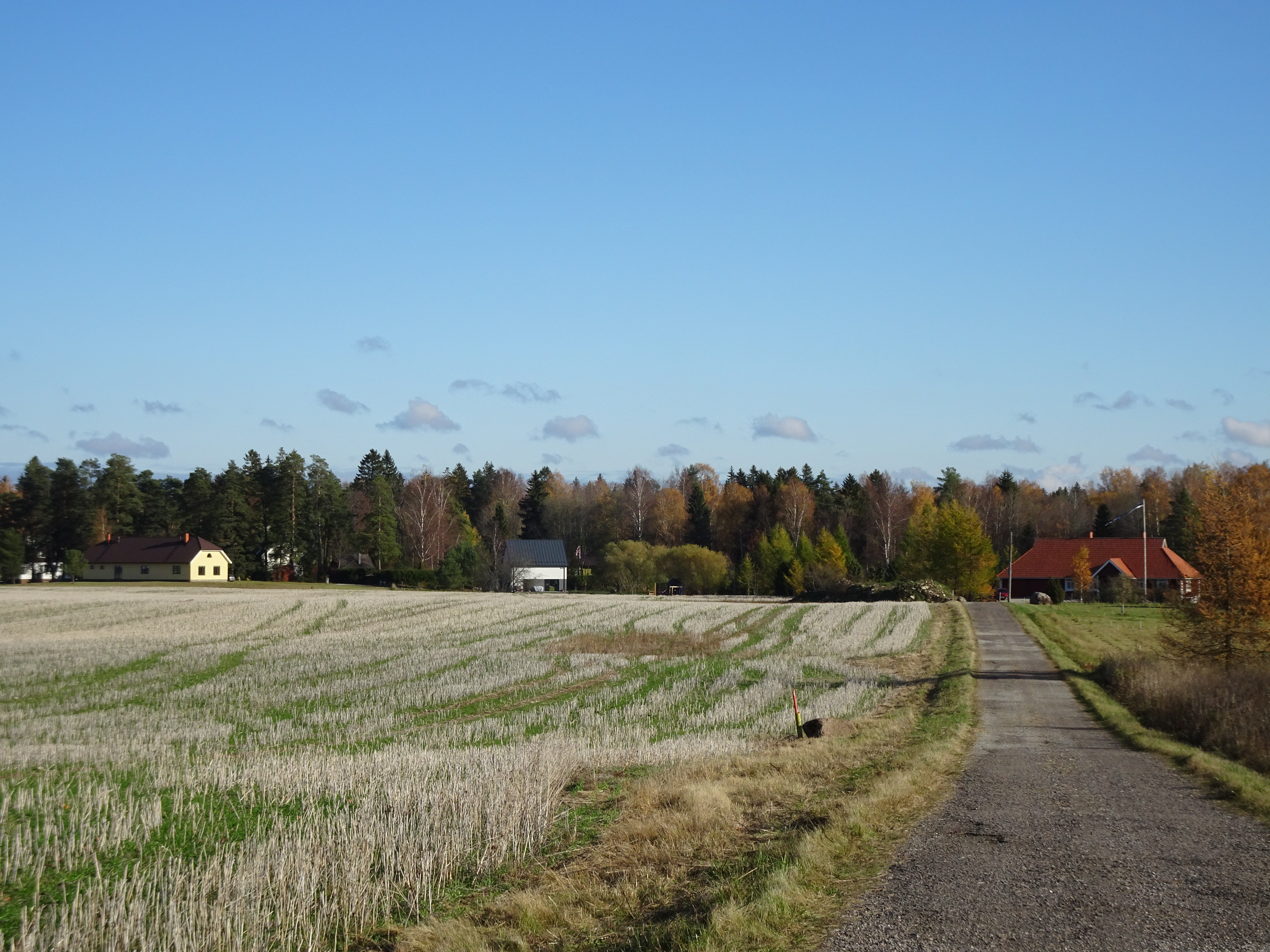
- Interactive map of Kalesi
- Country: Estonia
- County: Harju County
- Parish: Raasiku Parish

Area
  - Total: 942 km^{2} (364 sq mi)

Population
  - Total: 239
- Time zone: UTC+2 (EET)
  - Summer (DST): UTC+3 (EEST)
- Geocode: EHAK 2575

Kalesi is a village in Raasiku Parish, Harju County in northern Estonia.
