= Tõhelgi =

Village in Estonia

- Village
- Tõhelgi
- Interactive map of Tõhelgi
- Coordinates: 59°35′N 25°14′E
- Country: Estonia
- County: Harju County
- Parish: Raasiku Parish
- First mentioned: 1688

Government
  - Village elder: Andres Aju

Area
  - Total: 9.56 km^{2} (3.69 sq mi)

Population (2020)
  - Total: 47
  - Density: 4.9/km^{2} (13/sq mi)
- Time zone: UTC+2 (EET)
  - Summer (DST): UTC+3 (EEST)

Tõhelgi village is a small low-density village in the eastern part of Harju County, Raasiku Parish. It is the smallest village in Raasiku Parish - 47 people live in the village as of 01.01.2020.

== Historical background ==
Tõhelgi village is one of the oldest populated areas in northern Estonia, as evidenced by settlements, stone-cist graves and numerous sacrificial stones. In the 1840s, the Tõhelgi Manor was established in place of the former cluster village. The Soviet authorities brought significant changes to Tõhelgi village - the land of Tõhelgi was collectivised, and in 1947 a collective farm "Tõhelgi Liit" was formed, which was eventually merged with the Aruküla collective farm through various mergers. In 1967, a variety testing centre was established in the north-eastern part of the village to test various fruit and berry crops. It operated until the early 1990s.
