= Perila =

Village in Estonia

Coordinates: 59°18′N 25°10′E

- Village
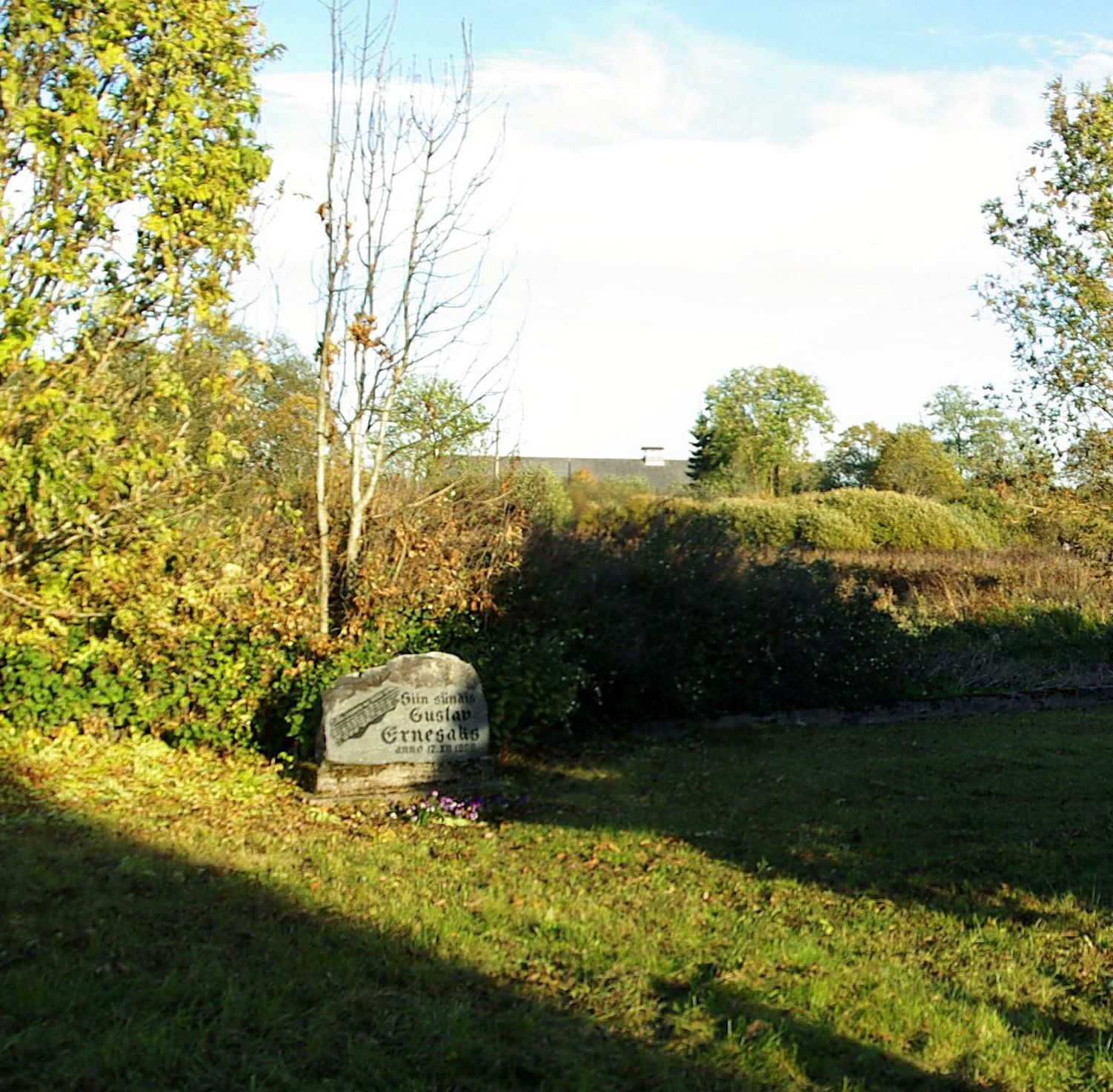
- Birthplace of Gustav Ernesaks in Perila
- Interactive map of Perila
- Country: Estonia
- County: Harju County
- Parish: Raasiku Parish
- Time zone: UTC+2 (EET)
  - Summer (DST): UTC+3 (EEST)

Perila is a village in Raasiku Parish, Harju County in northern Estonia.

Composer and choir conductor Gustav Ernesaks (1908–1993) was born in Perila.
