= Andre Sepp =

Estonian politician (born 1971)

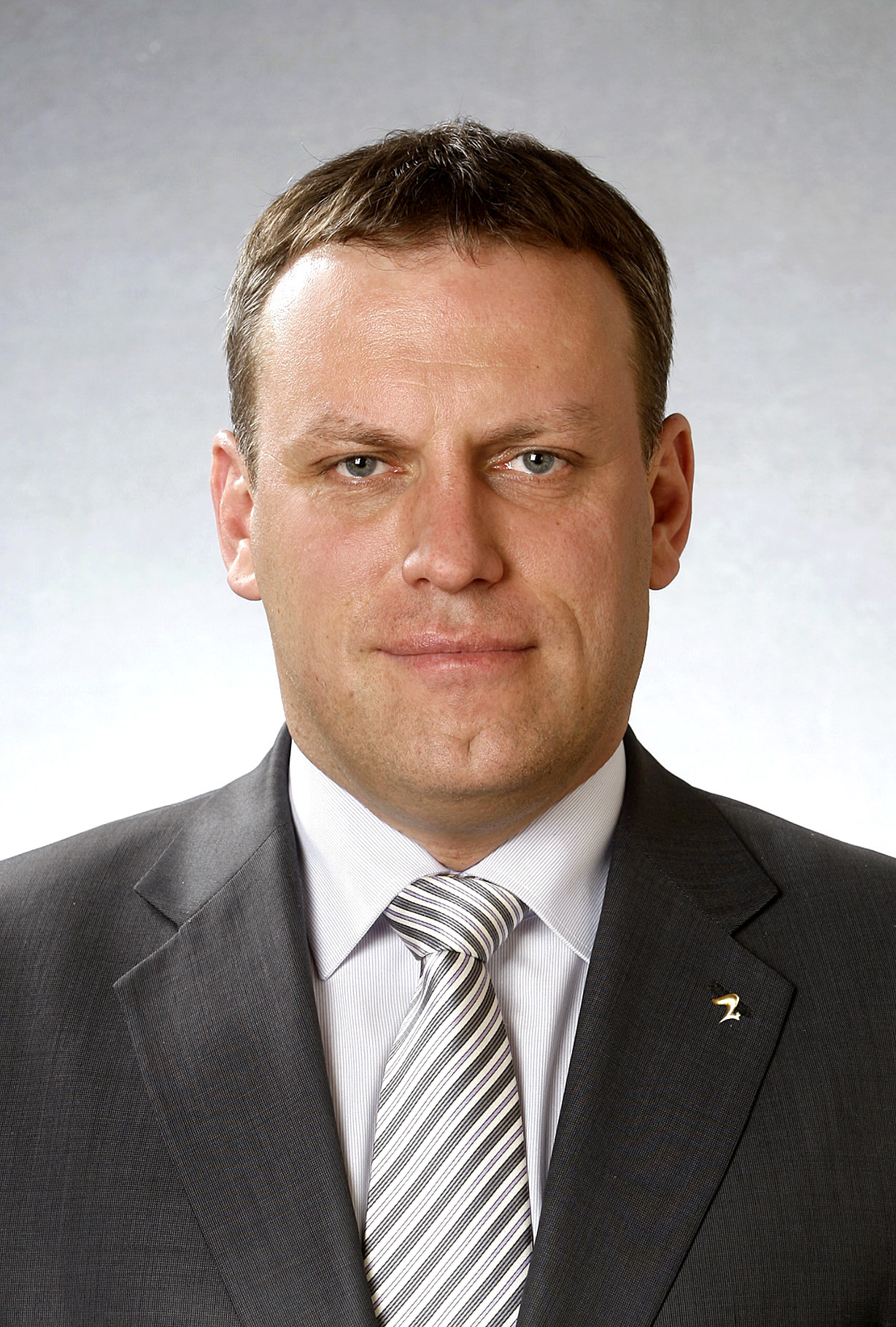
Andre Sepp in 2011

Andre Sepp (born 25 October 1971) is an Estonian politician. He was a member of the XII and XIII Riigikogu, representing the Estonian Reform Party.

Andre Sepp graduated from Tallinn 13th Secondary School and the Estonian National Defense Academy. He worked in the Harju Police Prefecture from 1992 to 1997. He was the Mayor of Raasiku Parish from 1999 until 2011 and the chairman of the Harju County Local Government Association from 2002 until 2007. As of 31 October 2017, he was again the mayor of Raasiku Parish.
