= Lagedi =

Borough in Estonia

- Small borough
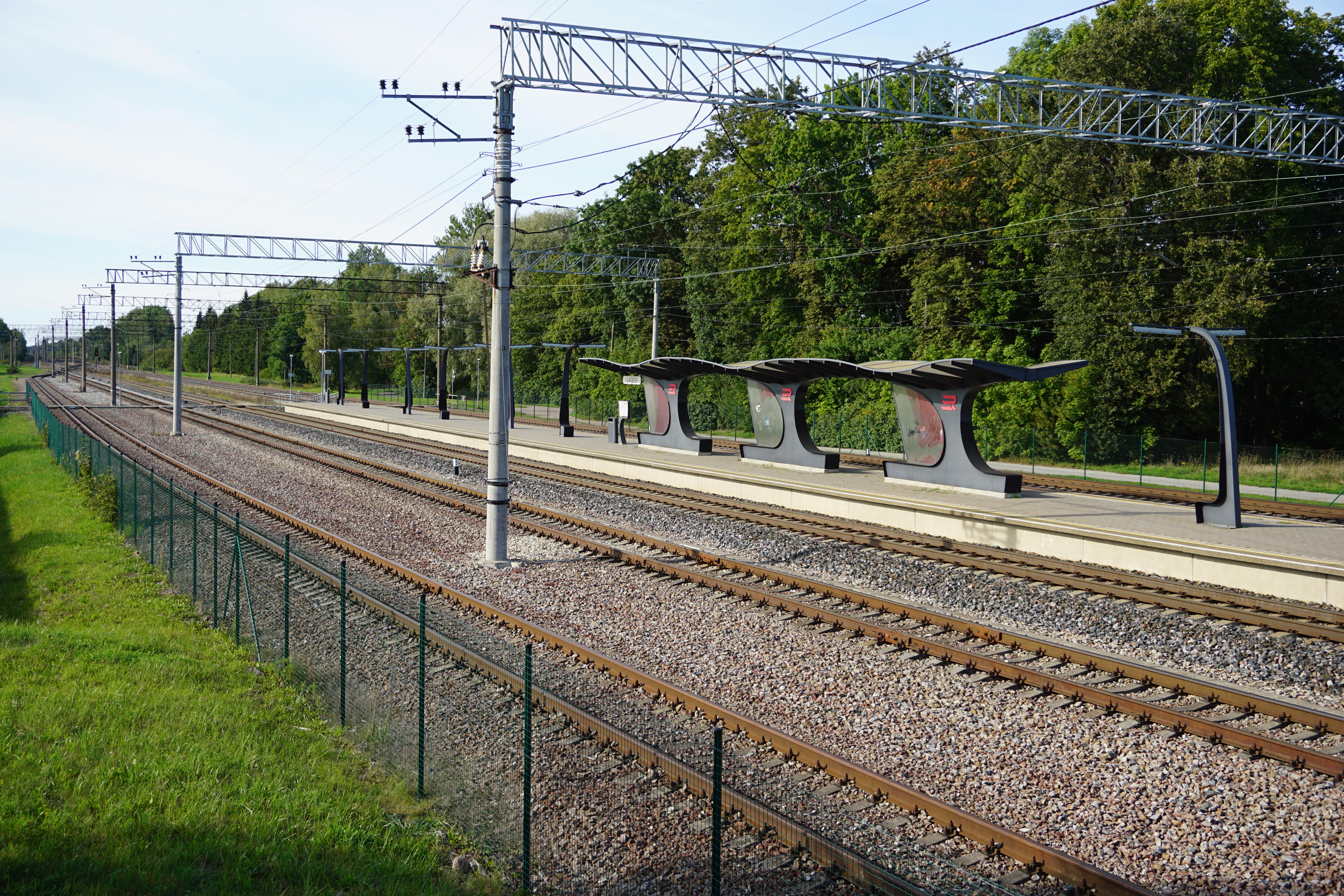
- Lagedi railway station

- Location in Estonia
- Coordinates: 59°24′14″N 24°56′19″E
- Country: Estonia
- County: Harju County
- Municipality: Rae Parish

Population (2022)
  - Total: 1,083

Lagedi (German: Laakt) is a small borough (Estonian: alevik) in Rae Parish, Harju County, northern Estonia. As of 2022, the settlement's population was 1,083.

Lagedi has a station on the Elron's eastern route.

Lagedi was the site of a slave-labor camp during German occupation in World War II. It was a satellite camp from the Vaivara concentration camp and mass executions of Jews took place in Lagedi.

Preceding station	Elron	Following station
Vesse towards Tallinn	Tallinn–Tartu–Valga	Kulli towards Valga
Vesse towards Tallinn	Tallinn–Tartu–Koidula	Kulli towards Koidula
Vesse towards Tallinn	Tallinn–Narva	Kulli towards Narva
Vesse towards Tallinn	Tallinn–Aegviidu	Kulli towards Aegviidu
