= Kurgla =

Village in Estonia

Coordinates: 59°23′N 25°05′E

- Village
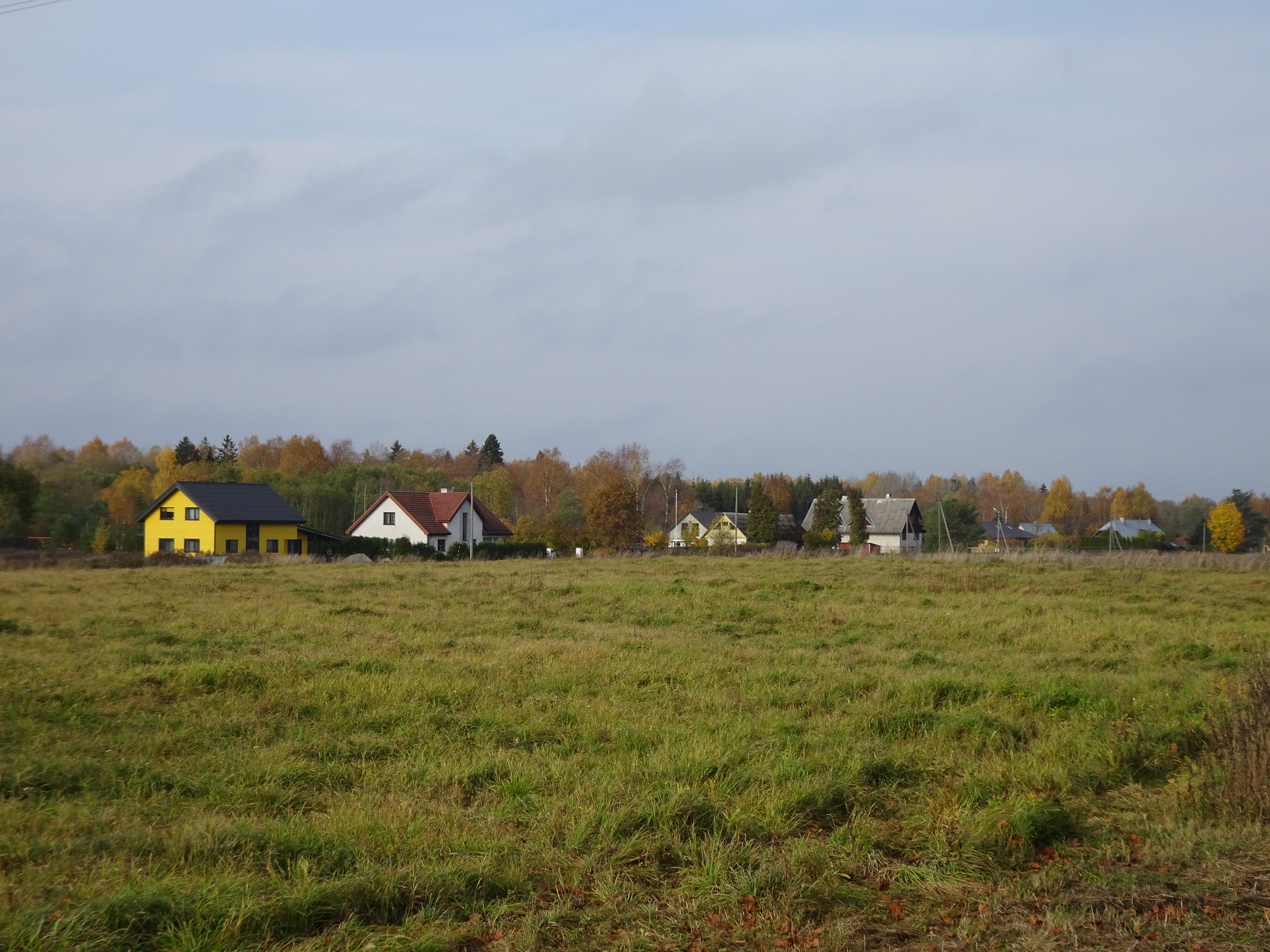
- Interactive map of Kurgla
- Country: Estonia
- County: Harju County
- Parish: Raasiku Parish
- Time zone: UTC+2 (EET)
  - Summer (DST): UTC+3 (EEST)

Kurgla is a village in Raasiku Parish, Harju County in northern Estonia.
