= Härmä Chapel =

Chapel in Setomaa, Estonia

- Härmä tsässon
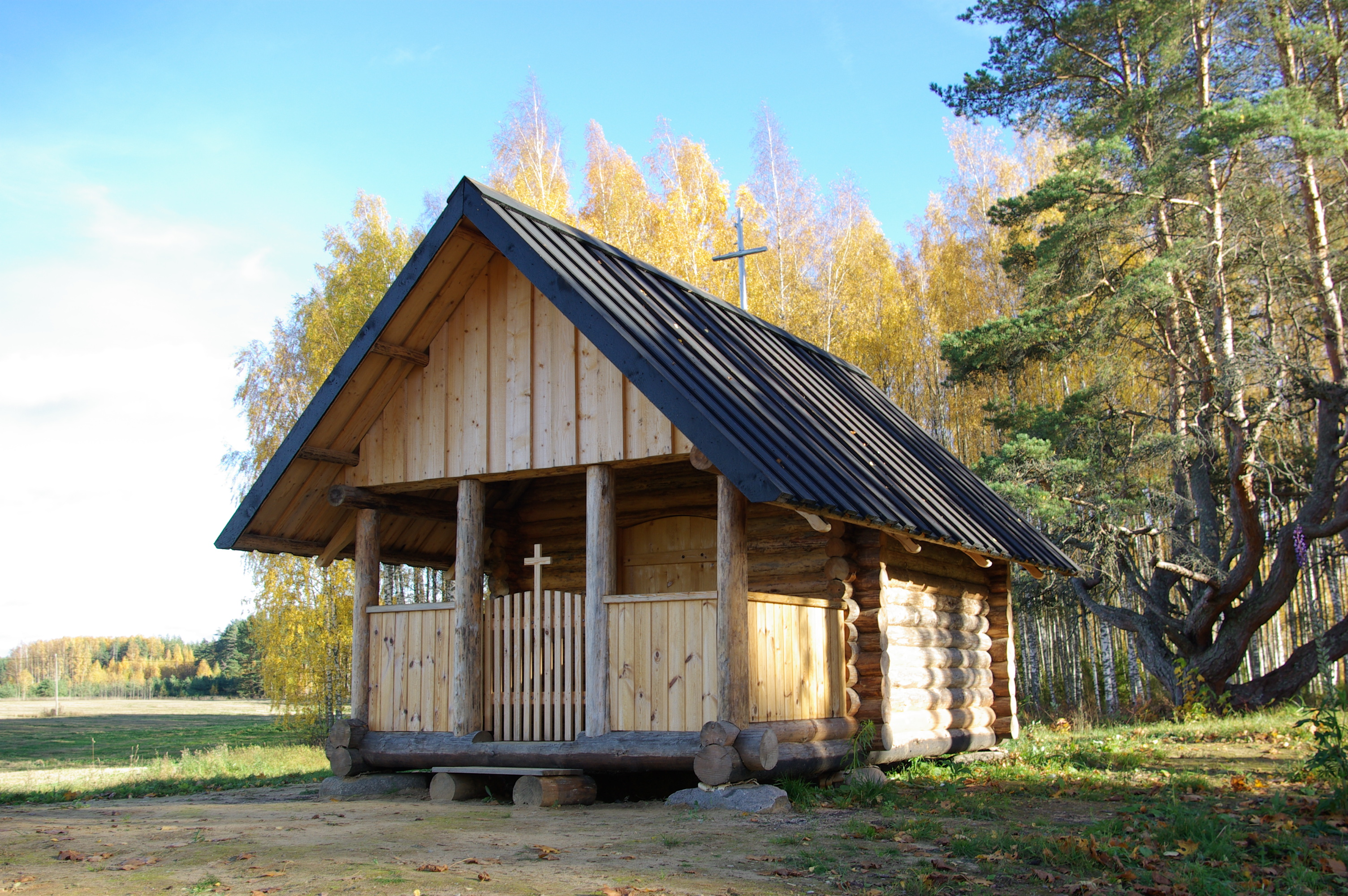

Religion
- Affiliation: Estonian Apostolic Orthodox Church
- Year consecrated: 2012

Location
- Location: Härmä, Setomaa Parish, Estonia
- Interactive map of Härmä Chapel
- Coordinates: 57°47′45.11″N 27°23′4.37″E

Architecture
- Materials: wood

Härmä Chapel (Estonian: Härma tsässon) is a small wooden Seto chapel dedicated to St. Michael in Härmä, Estonia.

== General information ==
The chapel was built through the initiative of Margus Timmo and with the help of people from nearby villages.
