= Olaf Schmeidt =

Estonian botanist (1930–2023)

- Born: May 15, 1930; Kehra, Estonia
- Died: November 12, 2023 (aged 93)
- Education: Estonian Academy of Agriculture
- Occupation: Botanist

Olaf-Gunnar Schmeidt (May 15, 1930 – November 26, 2023) was an Estonian botanist and dendrologist.

Schmeidt graduated from the Estonian Academy of Agriculture in 1956. His main area of interest was orchids. In 1965, he established the Matsi Arboretum.

== Works ==
- 1996: Eestimaa orhideed (Estonian Orchids). Tallinn: Varrak
- 2001: Eesti kaitsealuseid taimi ja loomi (Protected Plants and Animals of Estonia), coauthor. Tallinn: Keskkonnaministeerium
- 2005: Harjumaa huvitavaid taimi (Interesting Plants of Harju County). Tallinn: Harjumaa Keskkonnateenistus
- 2006: Harjumaa huvitavaid taimi. II (Interesting Plants of Harju County, Volume 2). Tallinn: Harjumaa Keskkonnateenistus

== Awards and recognitions ==
- 2000: Order of Merit of Harju County
- 2009: Honorary citizen of Anija Parish
- 2022: Estonian Nature Conservation Award
