= Mallavere =

Village in Estonia

Coordinates: 59°16′N 25°08′E

- Village
- Interactive map of Mallavere
- Country: Estonia
- County: Harju County
- Parish: Raasiku Parish
- Time zone: UTC+2 (EET)
  - Summer (DST): UTC+3 (EEST)

Mallavere is a village in Raasiku Parish, Harju County in northern Estonia.
