= Aino Kukk =

Estonian chess player

Personal information
- Born: September 10, 1930 Raasiku Parish, Estonia
- Died: November 7, 2006 (aged 76)

Chess career
- Country: Estonia; Soviet Union; Estonia

Aino Kukk (née Prits; 10 September 1930 – 7 November 2006) was an Estonian chess player, who won the Estonian Women's Chess Championship in 1955.

== Biography ==
In 1950 graduated from secondary school in Tallinn. After World War II Aino Kukk was one of the strongest women chess players in Estonia. Almost 30 times participated in Estonian Chess Championships for women, where she has won gold (1955), 2 silver (1953, 1968) and bronze (1952) medals. Four times won Estonian Sports Association «Jõud» Chess Championships for women. From 1959 to 1992 she worked in the Estonian Institute of industrial projects «Eesti Tööstusprojekt» - at first as laboratory assistant, later as chief engineer.
