= Aruküla manor =

Manor house in Estonia

Coordinates: 59.3670°N 25.1830°E

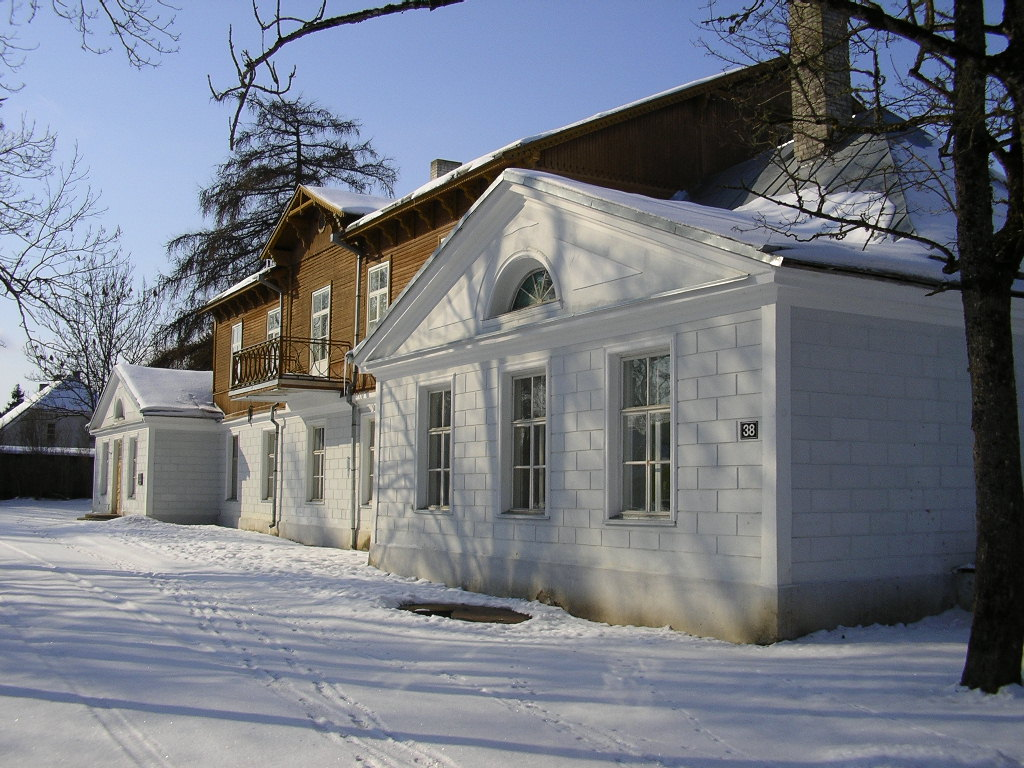
Aruküla manor house

Aruküla manor (Estonian: Aruküla mõis) is a manor house in Aruküla, Harju-Jaani in Raasiku parish in northern-central Estonia.

Aruküla manor was created in the 17th century from Raasiku manor. It was acquired from the state in 1766 by Karl Gustav von Baranoff (1715–1776), in the possession of whose descendants it continued until the 1920s, after which the building was used as a school.

== See also ==
- List of palaces and manor houses in Estonia
