= Rätla =

Village in Estonia

Coordinates: 59°19′11″N 25°12′02″E

- Village
- Interactive map of Rätla
- Country: Estonia
- County: Harju County
- Parish: Raasiku Parish
- Time zone: UTC+2 (EET)
  - Summer (DST): UTC+3 (EEST)

Rätla is a village in Raasiku Parish, Harju County in northern Estonia.
