= Gustav Ernesaks =

Estonian composer and choir conductor

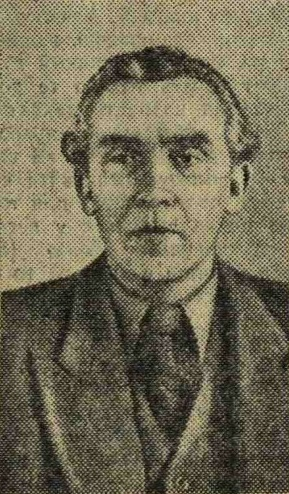
- Born: 12 December 1908; Perila, Harrien County, Governorate of Estonia, Russian Empire
- Died: 24 January 1993 (aged 84); Tallinn, Estonia
- Occupations: Composer, conductor
- Years active: 1930–1993
- Spouse: Stella Merjam

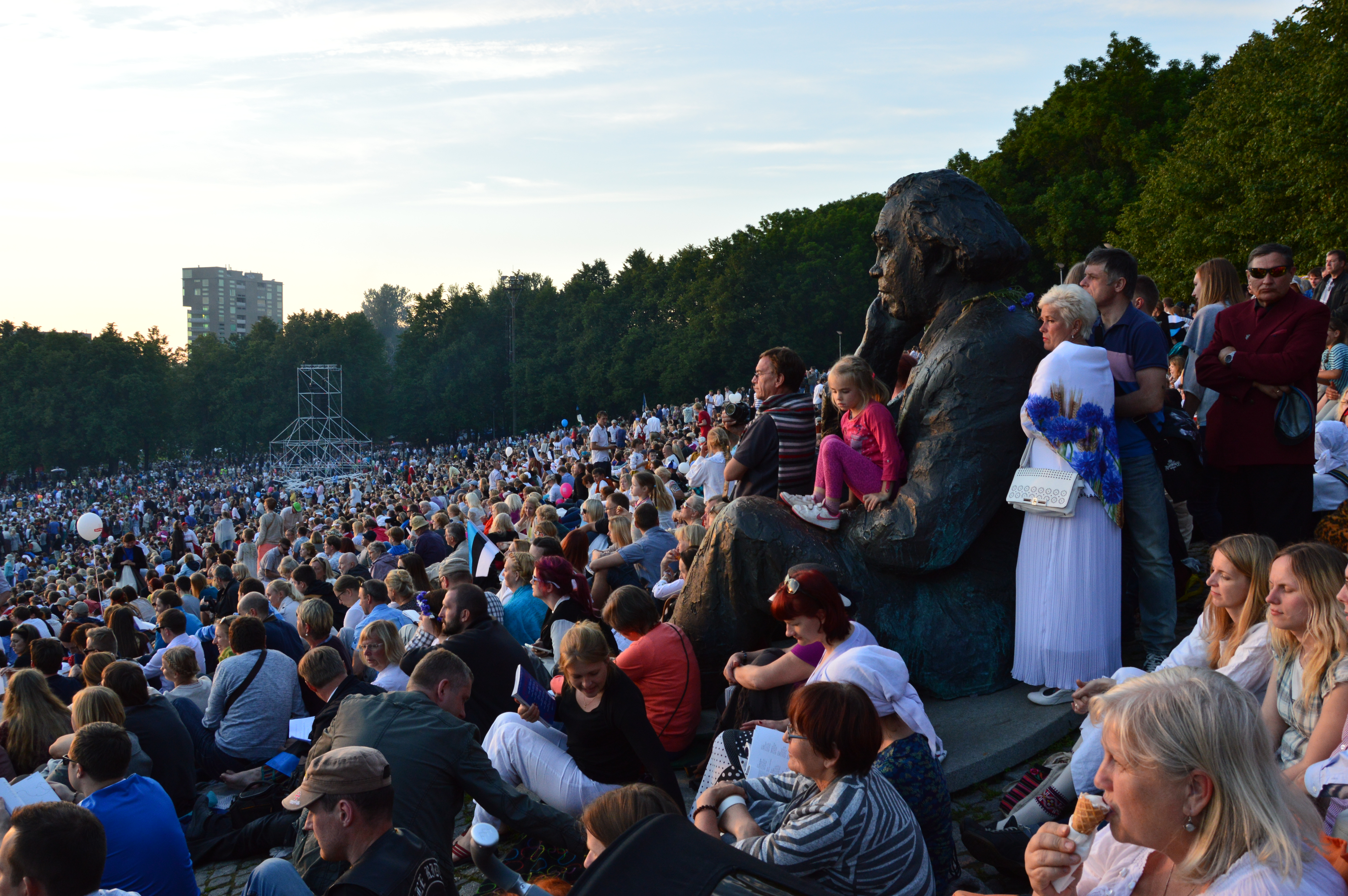
A statue of Gustav Ernesaks during XXVI Estonian Song Celebration

Gustav Ernesaks (12 December 1908 – 24 January 1993) was an Estonian composer and a choir conductor.

== Biography ==
Gustav Ernesaks was born on 12 December 1908 in Perila, Estonia. He was educated at the Estonian Academy of Music and Theatre where he was a pupil of Juhan Aavik and Artur Kapp. After completing his education, he founded the first professional choir in the history of Estonia in 1944, the State Academic Men's Choir (now the Estonian National Male Choir).

Ernesaks played an integral role in the Singing Revolution and was one of the father figures of the Estonian Song Festival tradition. One of his songs, a setting of Lydia Koidula's poem Mu isamaa on minu arm, became an unofficial national anthem during the years of the Estonian SSR. His performance of the song at the XVII Estonian Song Festival was one of the inspirations for Dmitri Shostakovich's 1970 a capella choral cycle, Loyalty. He dedicated the score to Ernesaks, who also premiered it in Tallinn. He also composed the Estonian SSR anthem used between 1945 and 1990.

In 1935, Ernesaks married Stella Merjam. They had three sons: Ott Ernesaks, Jüri Ernesaks and Peep Ernesaks. His wife died in 1973. Ernesaks died in Tallinn on 24 January 1993 aged 84. A statue of him was erected in 2004 on the Tallinn Song Festival Grounds.

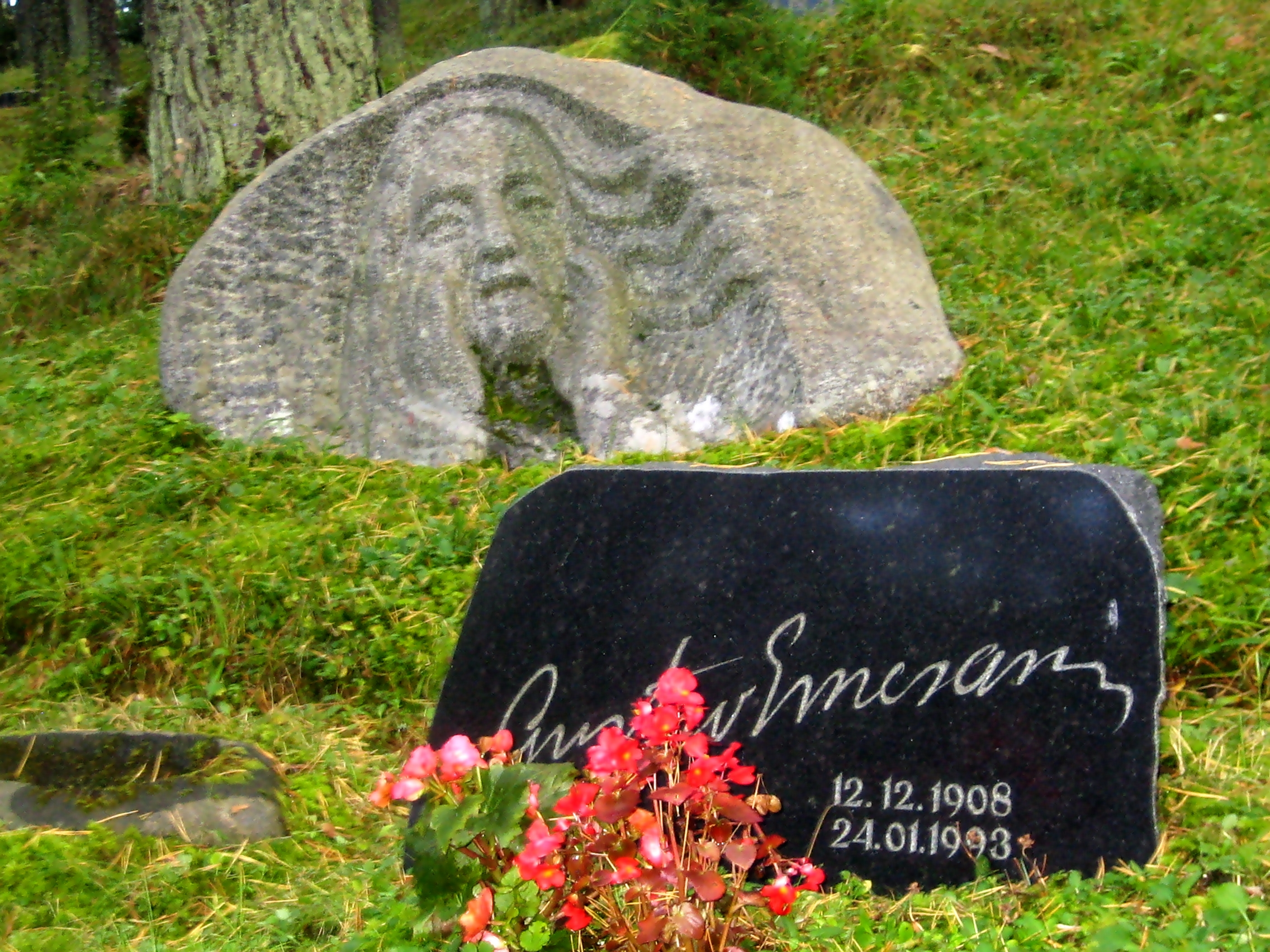
Ernesaks's grave at Metsakalmistu cemetery

== Honours and awards ==
Soviet Union

- Hero of Socialist Labour (1974)
- People's Artist of the USSR (1956)
- Stalin Prizes;
  - 2nd class (1947)
  - 3rd class (1951) – for the opera Tormide rand ("The Coast of Storms"; 1949)
- Lenin Prize (1970)
- Order of Lenin, three times (1974, 1951, 1967)
- Order of the October Revolution (1978)
- Order of the Red Banner of Labour (1946)
- Order of the Badge of Honour, twice (1965, 1988)

Estonia

- Order of the Estonian Red Cross, 5th class (1938)
- Honoured Artist of the Estonian SSR (1942)
- People's Artist of the Estonian SSR (1947)
- State Prize of the Estonian SSR (1947, 1948, 1949, 1950, 1959, 1965)
