= Kiviloo =

Village in Estonia

Coordinates: 59°17′N 25°14′E

- Village
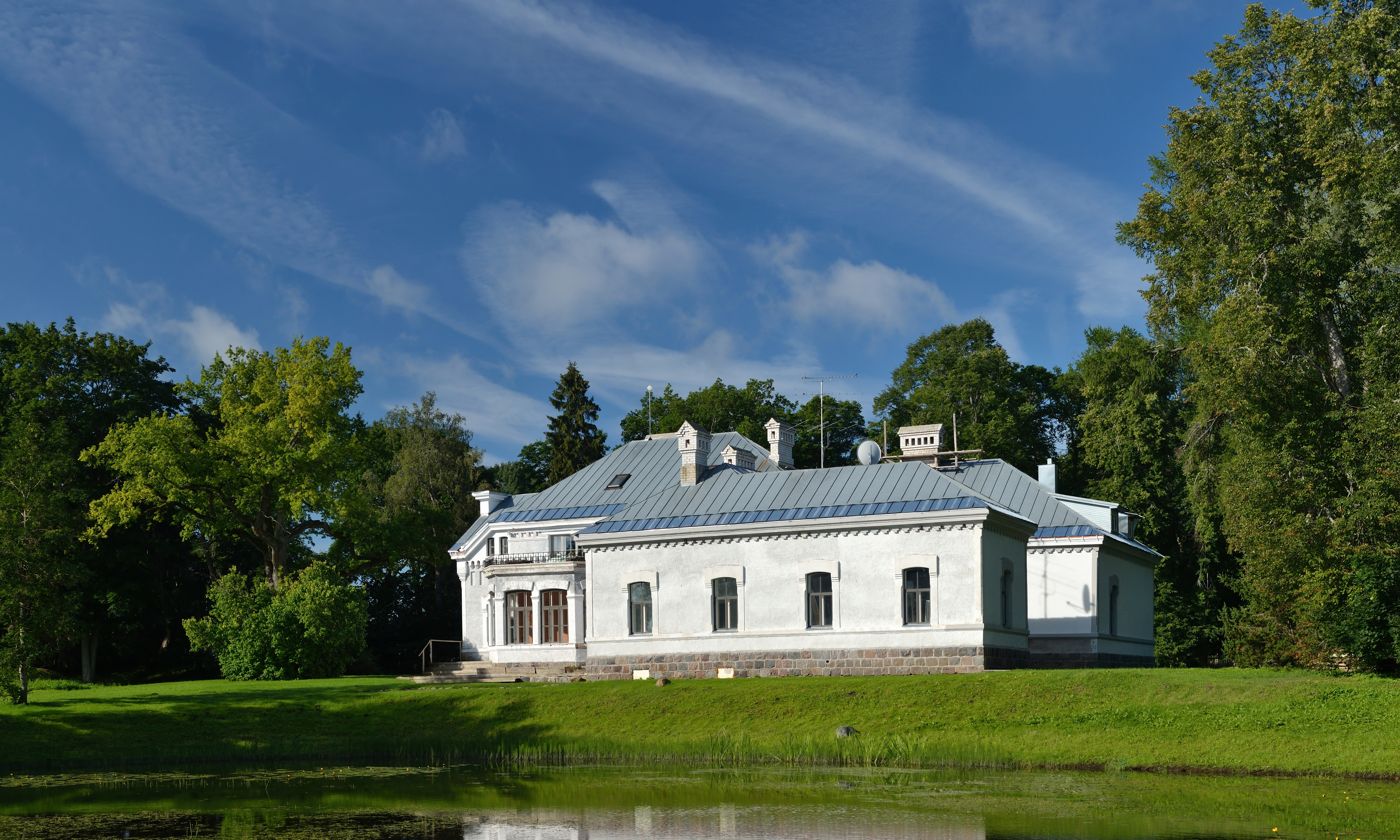
- Kiviloo manor
- Interactive map of Kiviloo
- Country: Estonia
- County: Harju County
- Parish: Raasiku Parish
- Time zone: UTC+2 (EET)
  - Summer (DST): UTC+3 (EEST)

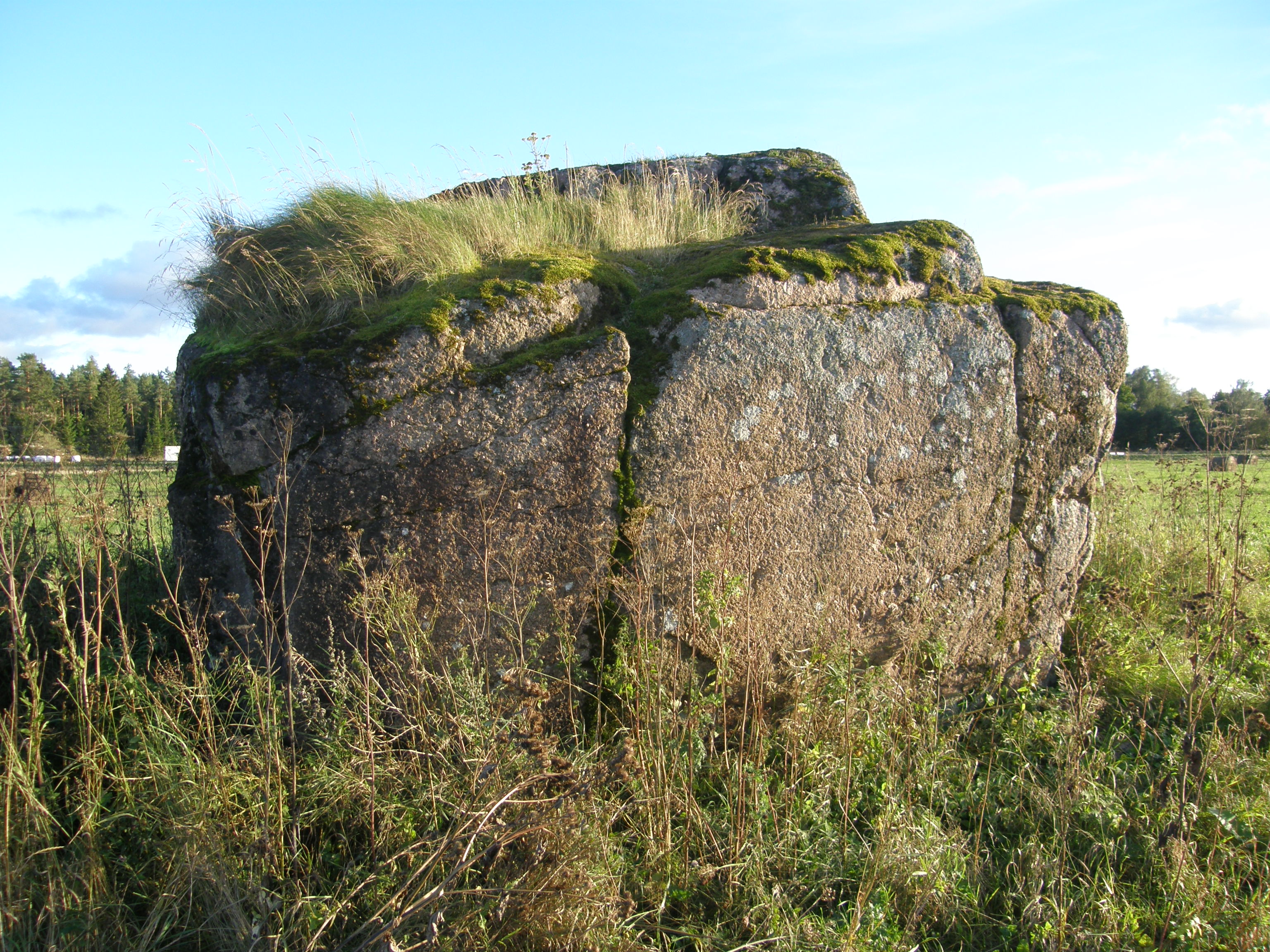
Kiviloo Witch Stone

Kiviloo (German: Fegefeuer) is a village in Raasiku Parish, Harju County in northern Estonia.
