= Aruaru =

Village in Estonia

Coordinates: 59°23′N 25°10′E

- Village
- Interactive map of Aruaru
- Country: Estonia
- County: Harju County
- Parish: Jõelähtme Parish
- Time zone: UTC+2 (EET)
  - Summer (DST): UTC+3 (EEST)

Aruaru is a village in Jõelähtme Parish, Harju County in northern Estonia.
