= Harma (Attica) =

Coordinates: 38°08′27″N 23°39′38″E

Harma (Ancient Greek: Ἅρμα) was a fortress and town, but not a deme, of ancient Attica, near Phyle, situated on a height visible from Athens.

The site of Harma is located at a site called Arma.
