= Härma, Harju County =

Village in Estonia

Härma
- village
- Location in Estonia
- Coordinates: 59°16′37″N 25°09′47″E
- Country: Estonia
- County: Harju County
- Municipality: Raasiku Parish

Population (01.10.2011)
  - Total: 132

Härma is a village in Raasiku Parish, Harju County in northern Estonia. It has a population of 132 (as of 1 October 2011).
