= Parila, Harju County =

Village in Estonia

Parila
- Village
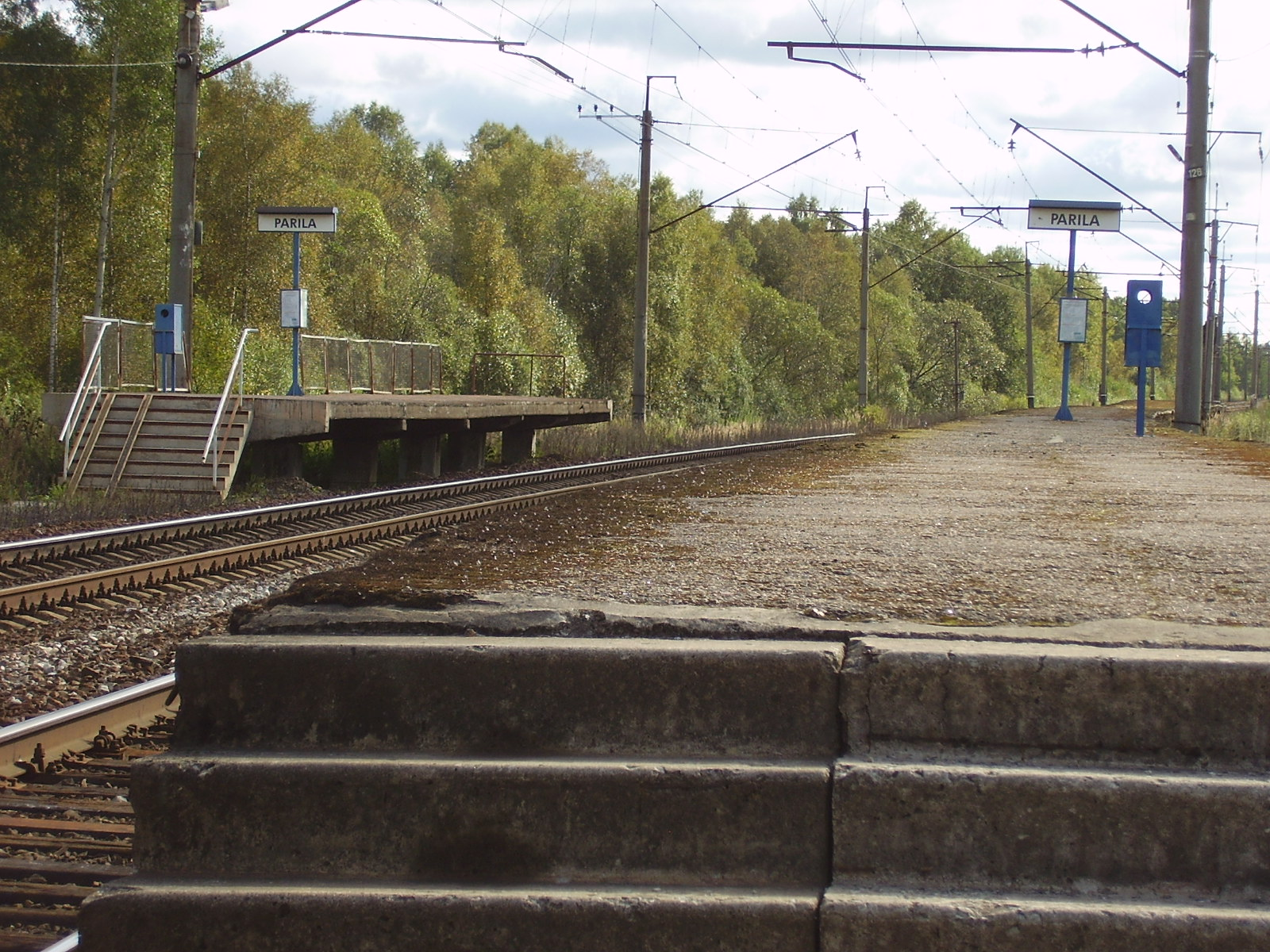
- Parila railway station

- Location in Estonia
- Coordinates: 59°20′42″N 25°15′41″E
- Country: Estonia
- County: Harju County
- Municipality: Anija Parish

Population (01.01.2010)
  - Total: 80

Parila is a village in Anija Parish, Harju County in northern Estonia. It has a population of 80 (as of 1 January 2010). Parila has a station on the Elron rail line.

Preceding station	Elron	Following station
Raasiku towards Tallinn	Tallinn–Aegviidu	Kehra towards Aegviidu
