= Härmä, Estonia =

Village in Estonia

Härmä
- Village
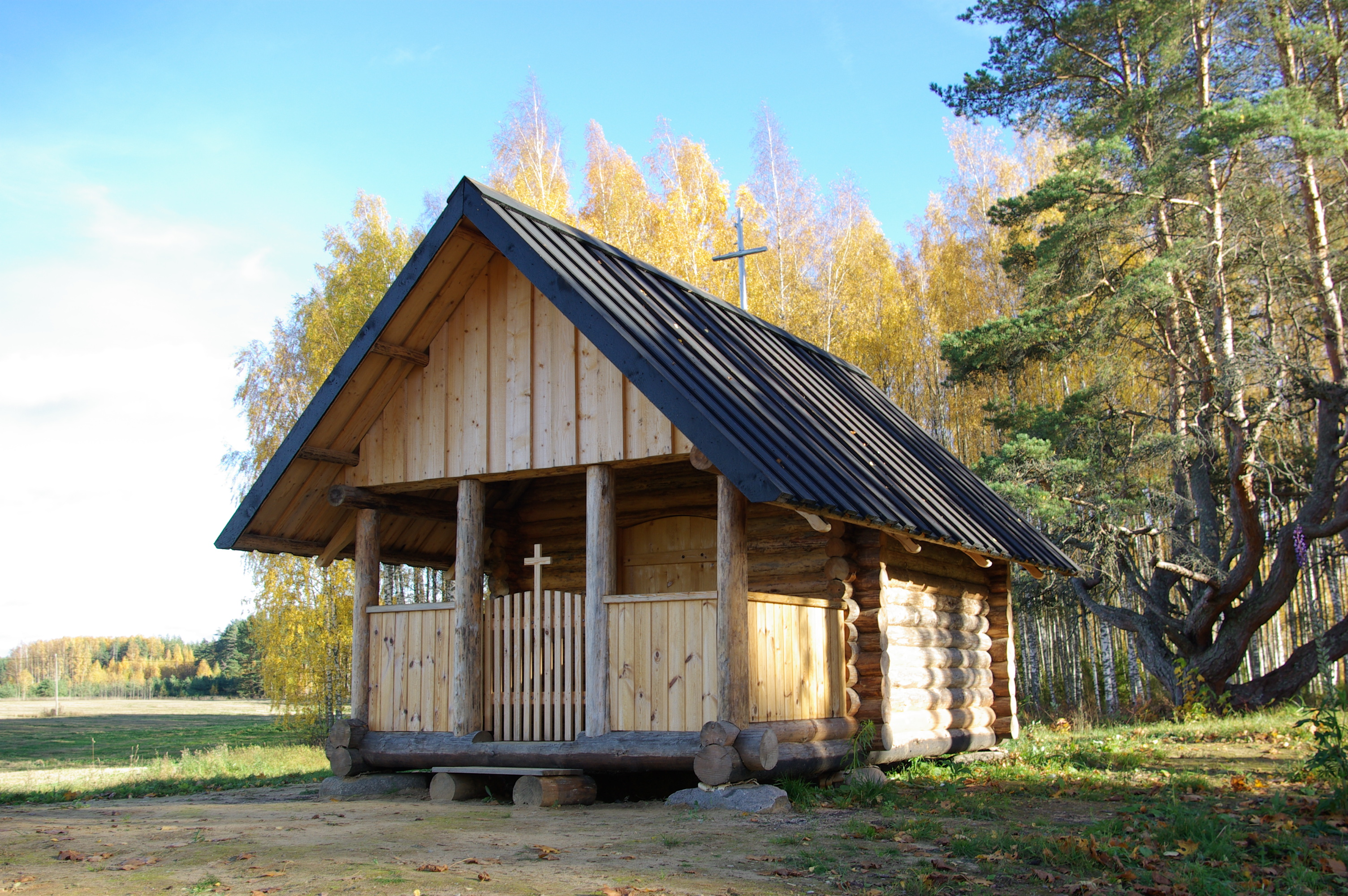
- Härmä Chapel, a wooden Seto chapel in Härmä

- Location in Estonia
- Coordinates: 57°47′44″N 27°23′04″E
- Country: Estonia
- County: Võru County
- Municipality: Setomaa Parish

Population (2011 Census)
  - Total: 6

Härmä is a village in Setomaa Parish, Võru County in southeastern Estonia.

As of the 2011 census, the settlement's population was 6.

Härmä Chapel, a small wooden Seto chapel, is located in the village.
