= Aruküla =

Borough in Estonia

- Small borough
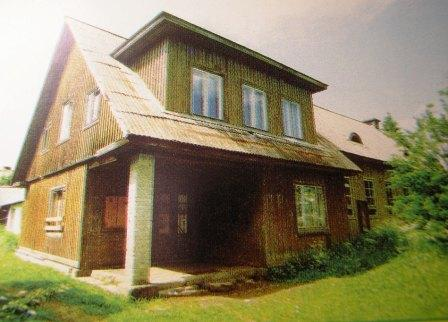
- Aruküla old culture centre

- Location in Estonia
- Coordinates: 59°21′55″N 25°04′48″E
- Country: Estonia
- County: Harju County
- Municipality: Raasiku Parish
- First appeared on map: 1291

Area
  - Total: 3.56 km^{2} (1.37 sq mi)

Population (01.01.2020)
  - Total: 2,113
  - Density: 594/km^{2} (1,540/sq mi)
- Time zone: UTC+2 (EET)
  - Summer (DST): UTC+3 (EEST)
- Postal code: 75201

Aruküla (German: Arroküll) is a small borough (Estonian: alevik) in Harju County, northern Estonia. It is the administrative centre of Raasiku Parish. Aruküla had a population of 2,113 on 1 January 2020. Aruküla has a station on the Elron's eastern route.

== Gallery ==
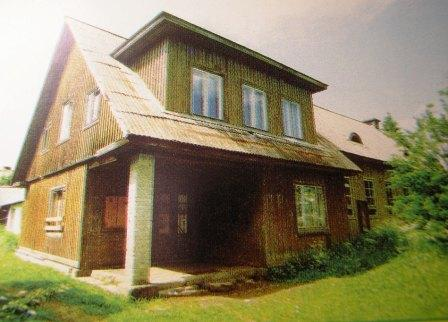
Aruküla old culture house

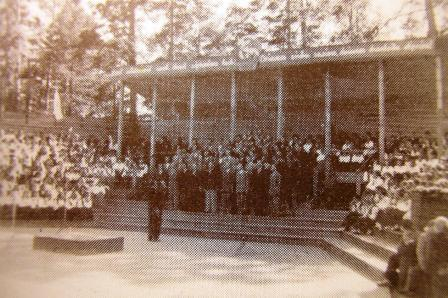
Aruküla song festival grounds in the 1960s.

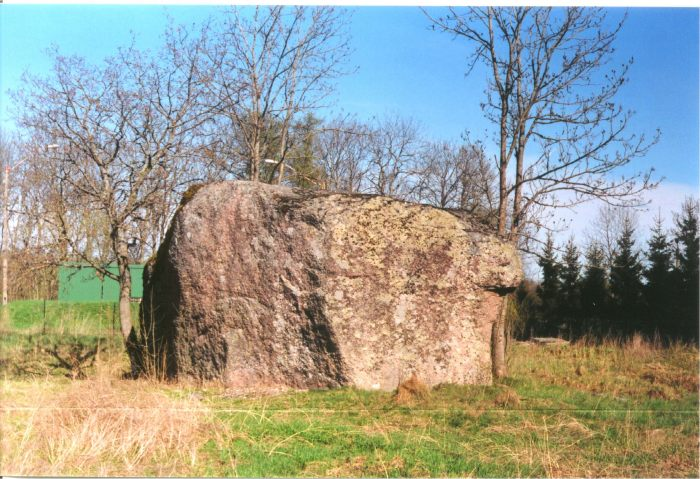
Aruküla glacial erratic

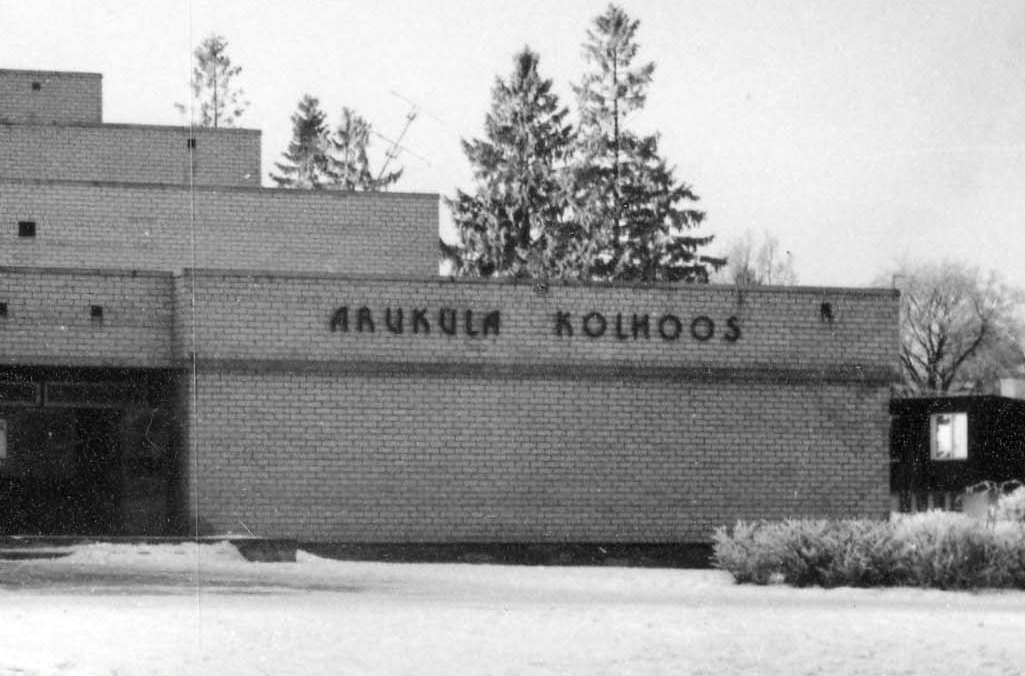
Former centre of Aruküla kolkhoz.

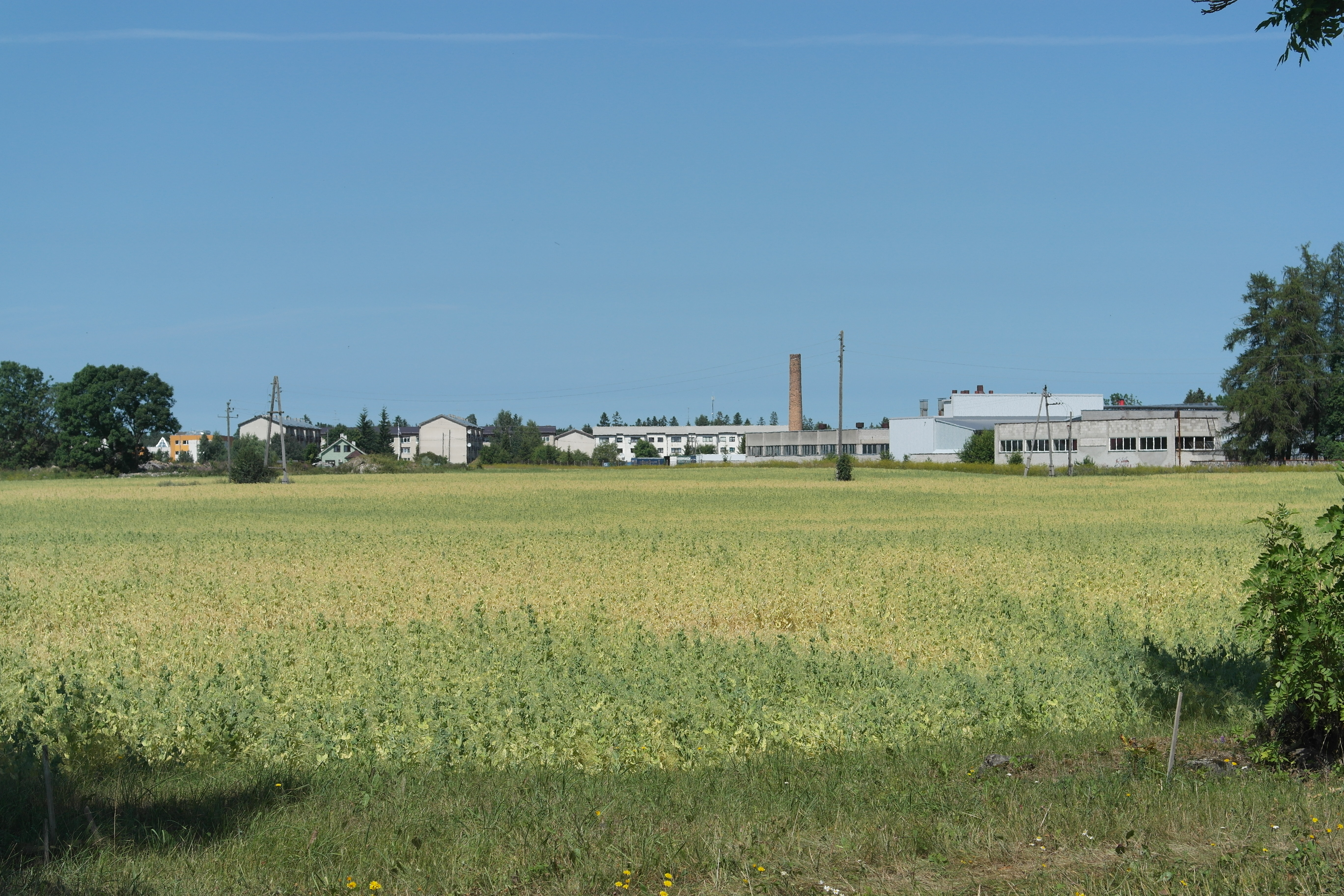
View to Aruküla

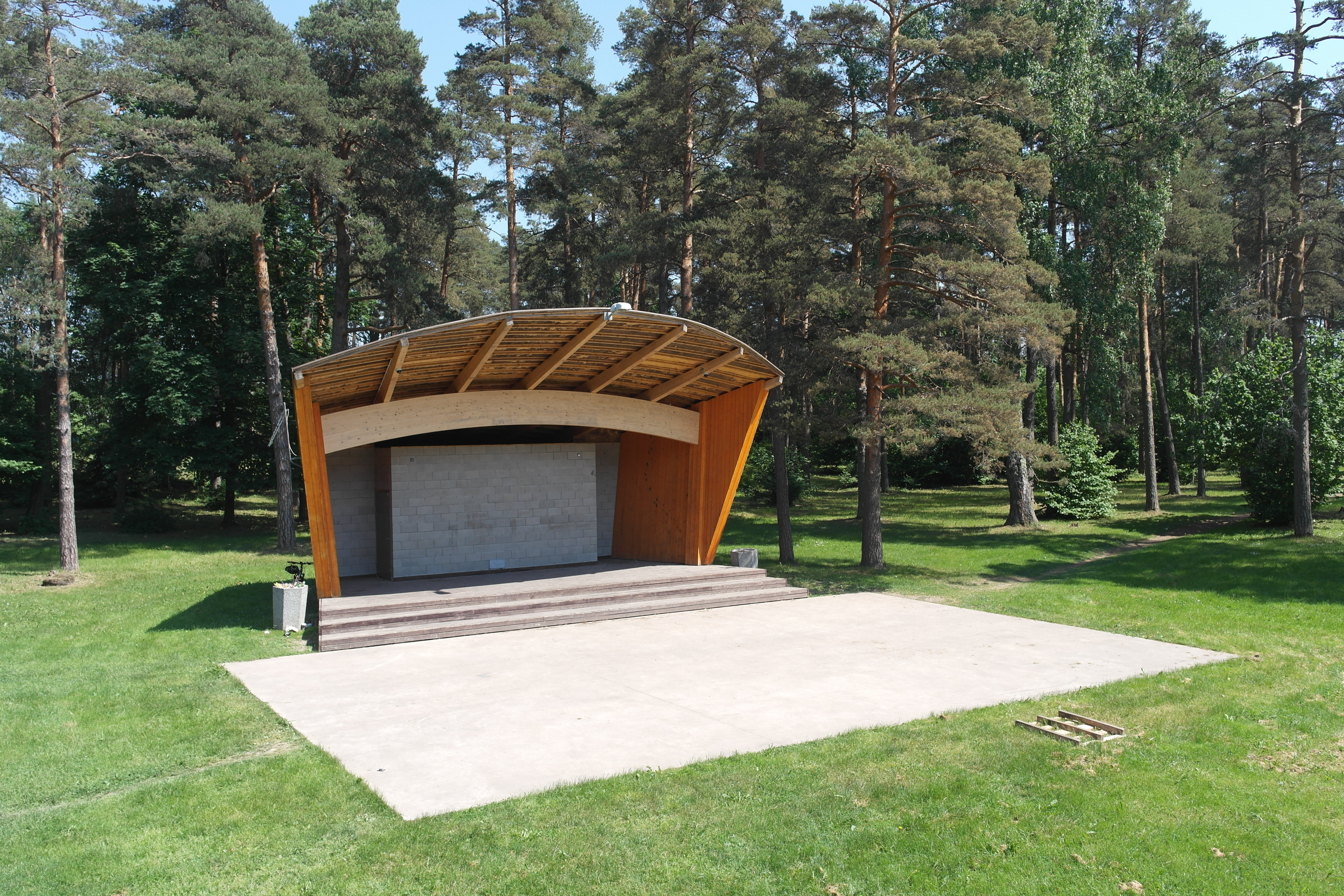
Aruküla song court

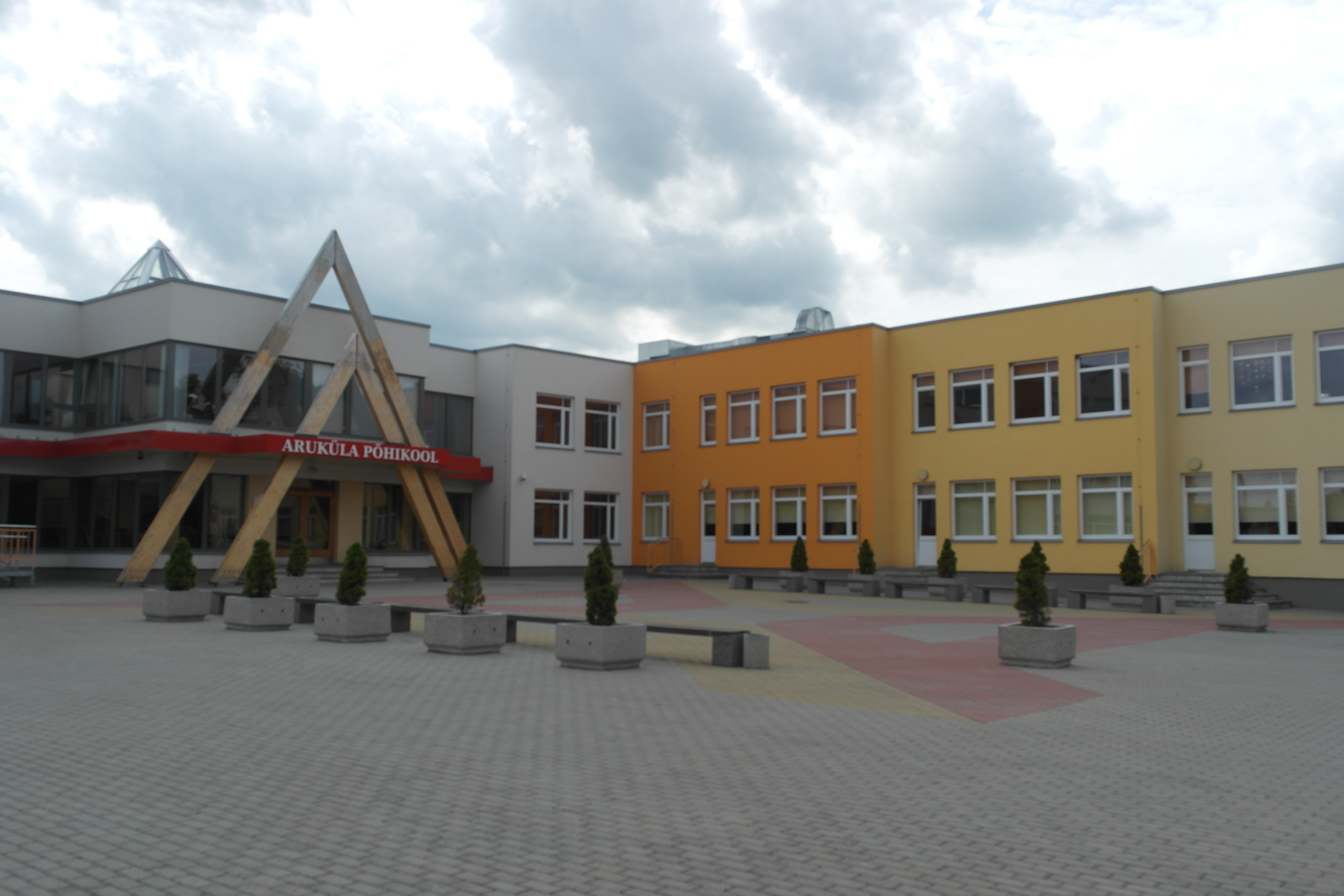
Aruküla Basic School, or Aruküla Põhikool

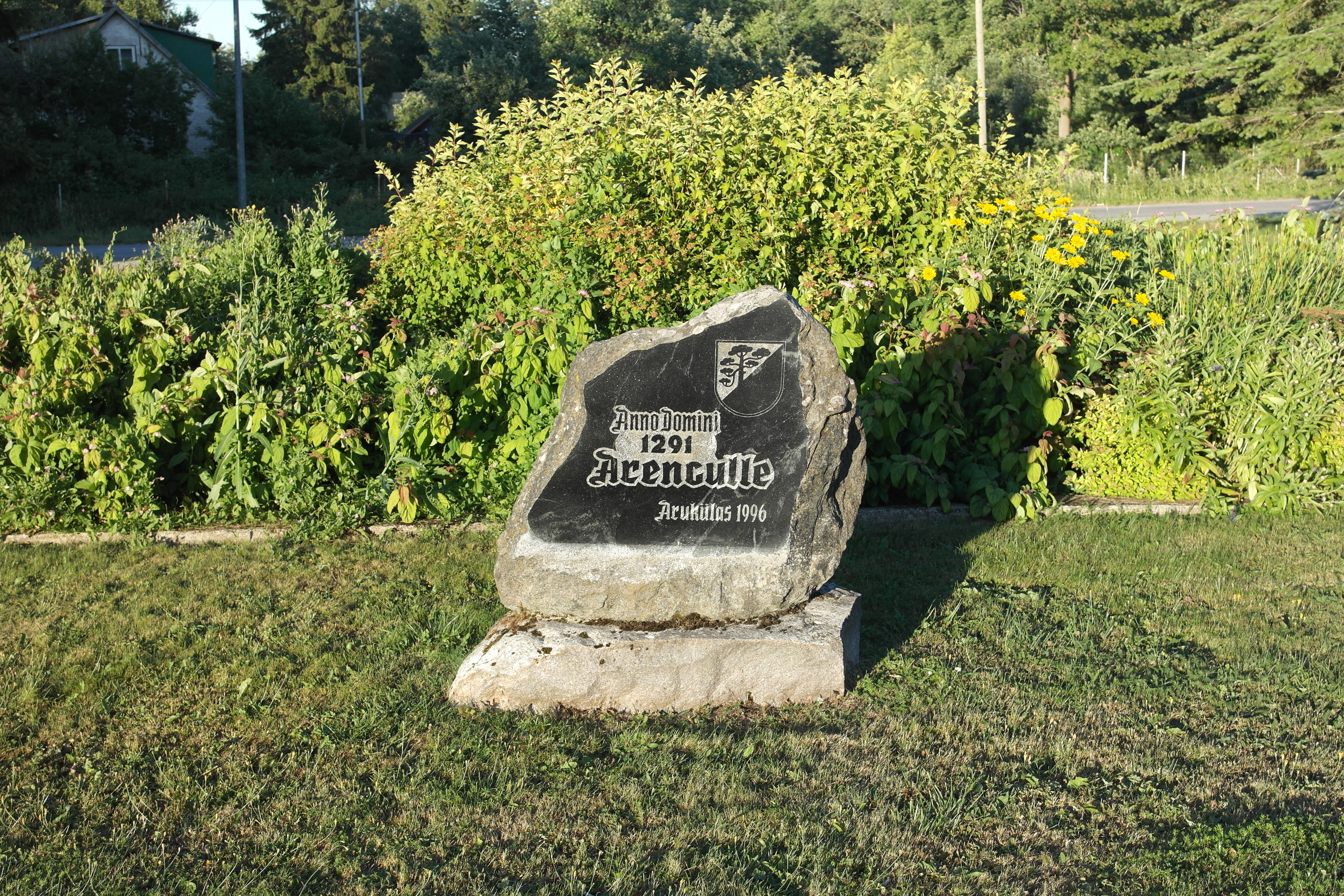
Stone, indicating Aruküla first mention
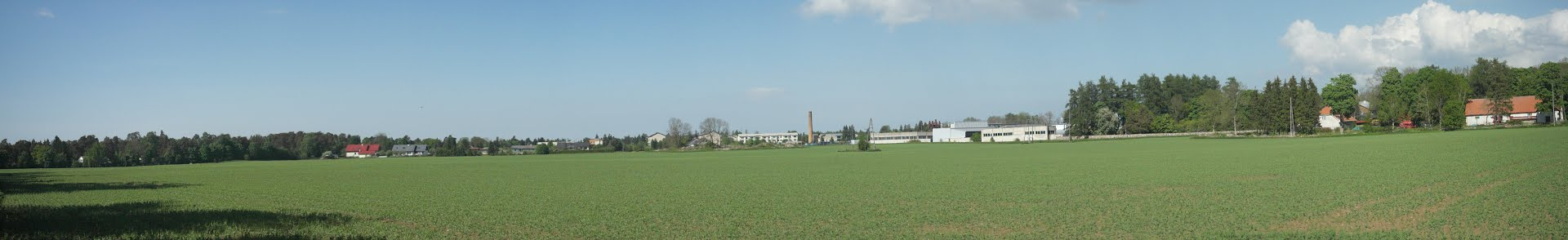
Panorama of Aruküla, 2013

== See also ==
- Aruküla manor
- Aruküla railway station
