= Raudalu =

Subdistrict of Tallinn, Estonia

Coordinates: 59.370861°N 24.752669°E

- Subdistrict of Tallinn
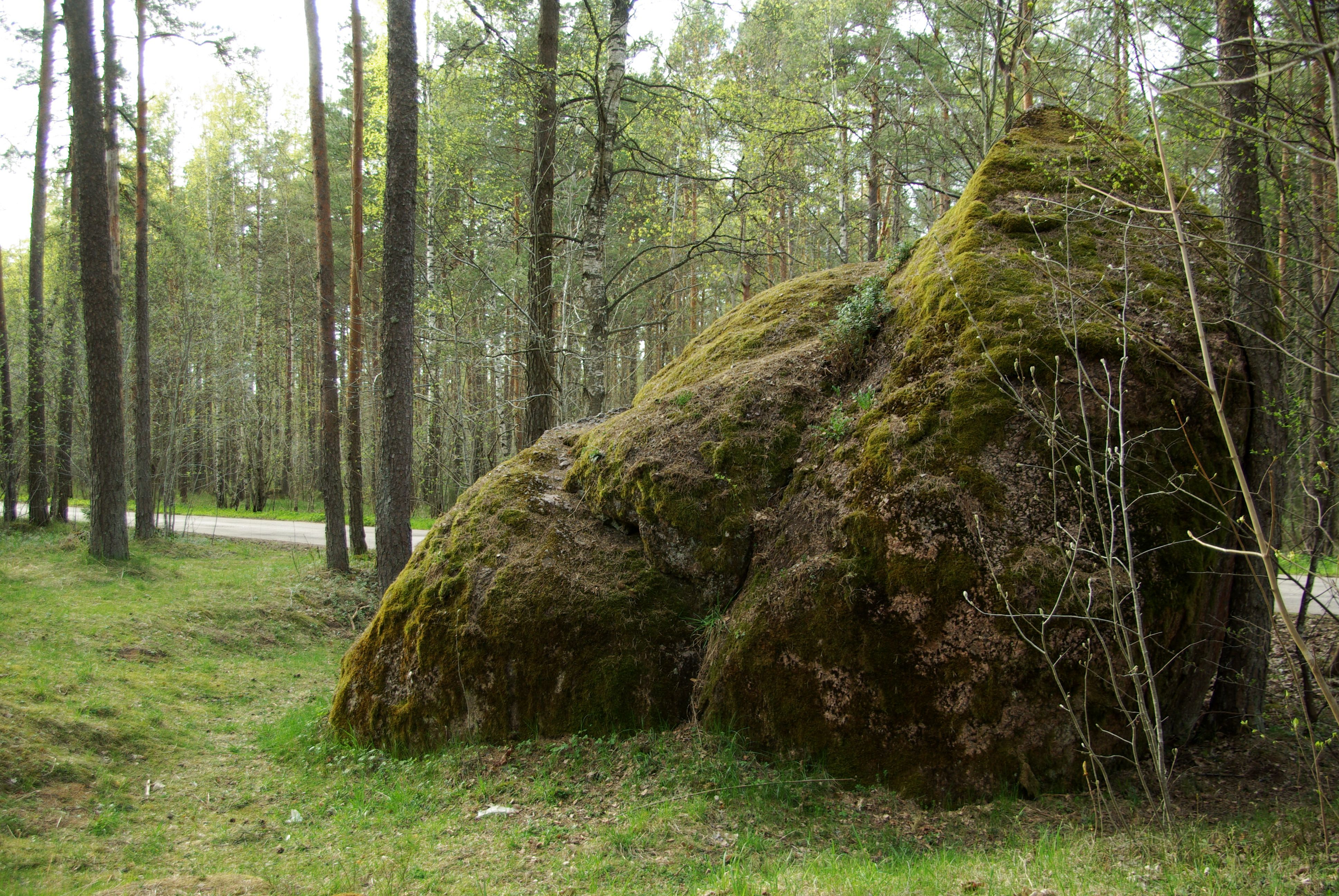
- Large Stone of Raudalu, natural heritage monument

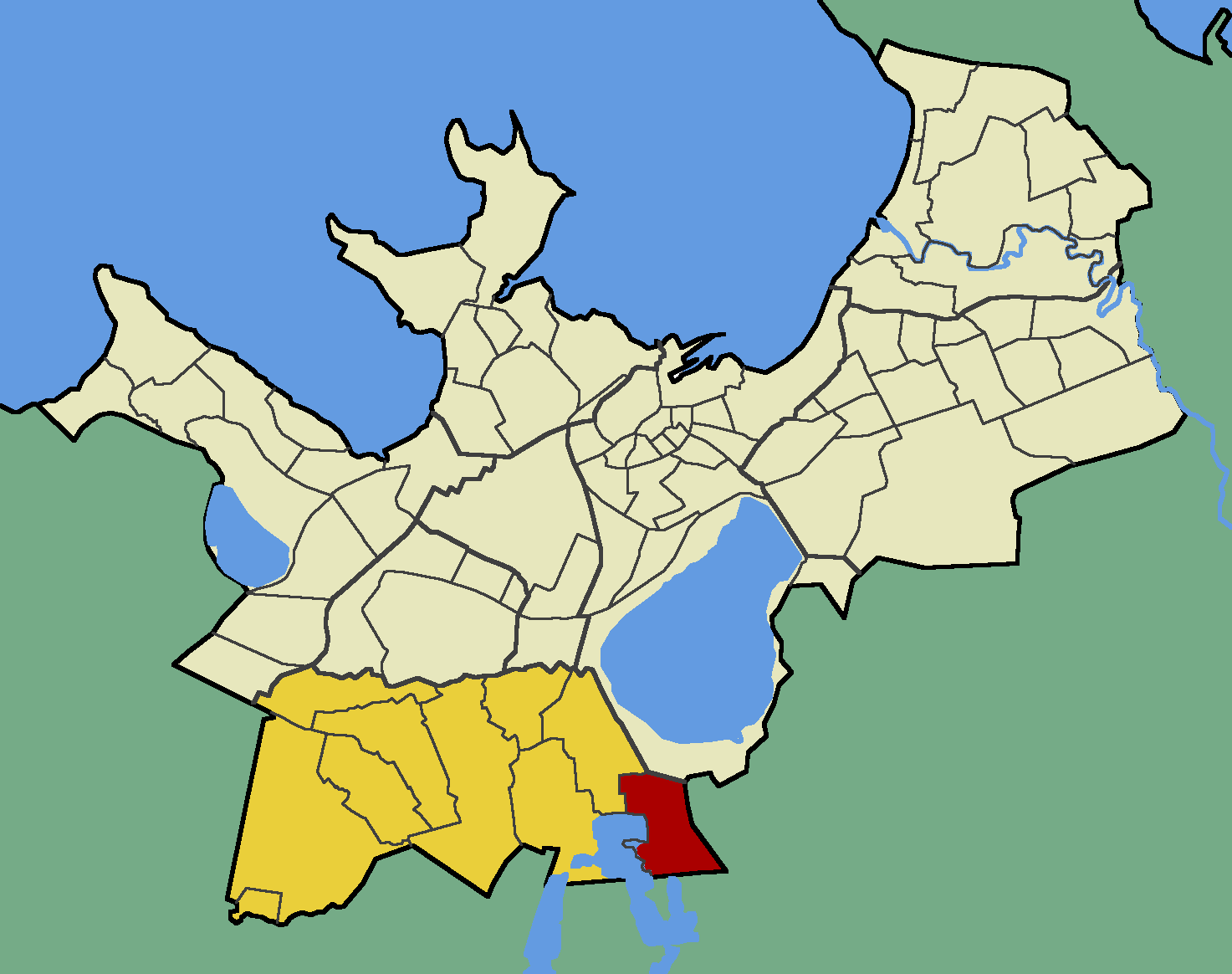
- Raudalu within Nõmme District
- Country: Estonia
- County: Harju County
- City: Tallinn
- District: Nõmme

Area
  - Total: 1.8 km^{2} (0.69 sq mi)

Population (01.01.2022)
  - Total: 720
  - Density: 400/km^{2} (1,000/sq mi)

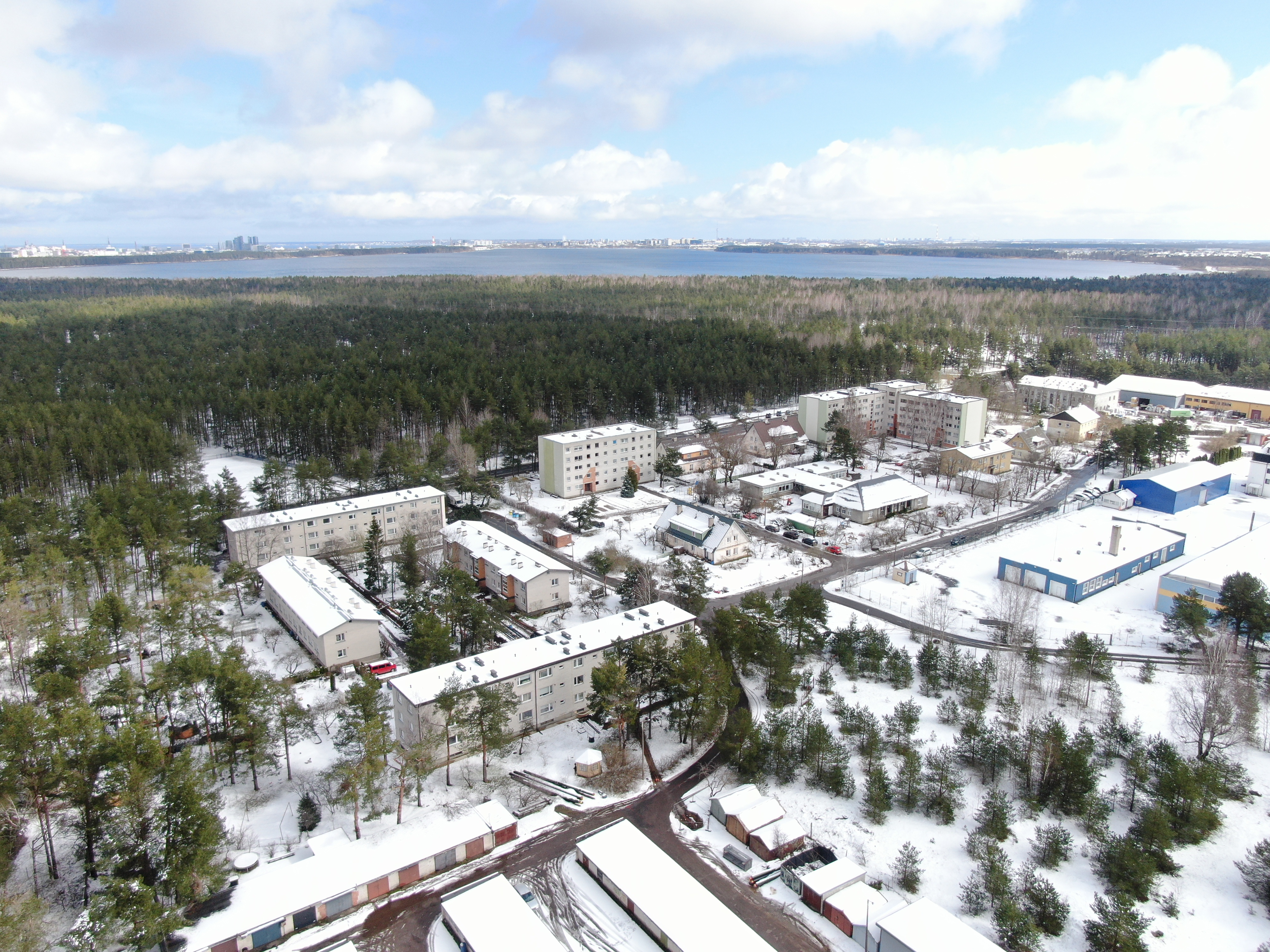
Drone photo of the Raku microdistrict in Raudalu

Raudalu is a subdistrict (Estonian: asum) in the district of Nõmme, Tallinn, the capital of Estonia. It covers an area of 1.8 km^{2} (0.69 sq mi) and has a population of 720 (as of 1 January 2022), of which 58 % are Estonian and 30 % are Russian. The population density is 400/km^{2} (1,040/sq mi).

== History ==
The oldest records regarding Raudalu, previously known as Raudaru, date to the 17th century. A pub named Raudarro (Estonian: Raudarro kõrts, Swedish: Raudarro krog) is marked on the Holmberg map published in 1689, sometimes spelled Raudaro.

An old trading road goes through the subdistrict, connecting to the mouth of the river Pärnu and, on a branching road, to the region of Sakala. Since 1949 the road is named after the town it leads to in modern era, Viljandi.

At one point, a village began to grow around the pub, although the exact time period is unknown. By the end of the 19th century, and continuing at the beginning of the 20th century a farm named Raudtalu (Estonian for "Iron farm") appears on military maps, which has led to the hypothesis, that the present-day name of Raudalu is a combination of Raudtalu and Raudaru.

One part of Raudalu is the microdistrict of Raku, which got its name from a former fur farm in the area that had moved to Raudalu from Kose in the district of Pirita. During Soviet occupation, the fur farm was known as Raku Fur Farm Sovkhoz, with a branch in the vicinity of Keila.

The northern part of the village of Raudalu was merged with Tallinn in 1958, which led to the other streets in Raudalu getting names for the first time, several of which were linked to the fur farm, such as Hõberebase Street or Sinirebase Street (Silver Fox and Blue Fox Street in English).

== Economy ==
Average monthly gross income per employee was 1,589 € in 2022, the second lowest in Nõmme, ahead of Männiku.

One of Estonia's largest ice cream companies, Balbiino AS, is headquartered in Raudalu, which also hosts a small private ice cream museum aimed at preteen children.

== Transport ==
Locations in Raudalu are connected via city bus line 57, which also provides a connection to the neighboring subdistricts Männiku and Liiva, as well as Järve and Tondi in Kristiine, ending near Tondi railway station.

== Nature ==
The largest part of Raudalu is covered by the forest of Raudalu (Raudalu mets). It is home to several major glacial erratic boulders known as Raudalu Stones (Raudalu kivid), registered as natural heritage monuments.
