= Vana-Mustamäe =

Subdistrict of Tallinn, Estonia

Coordinates: 59.3911997°N 24.6539104°E

- Subdistrict of Tallinn
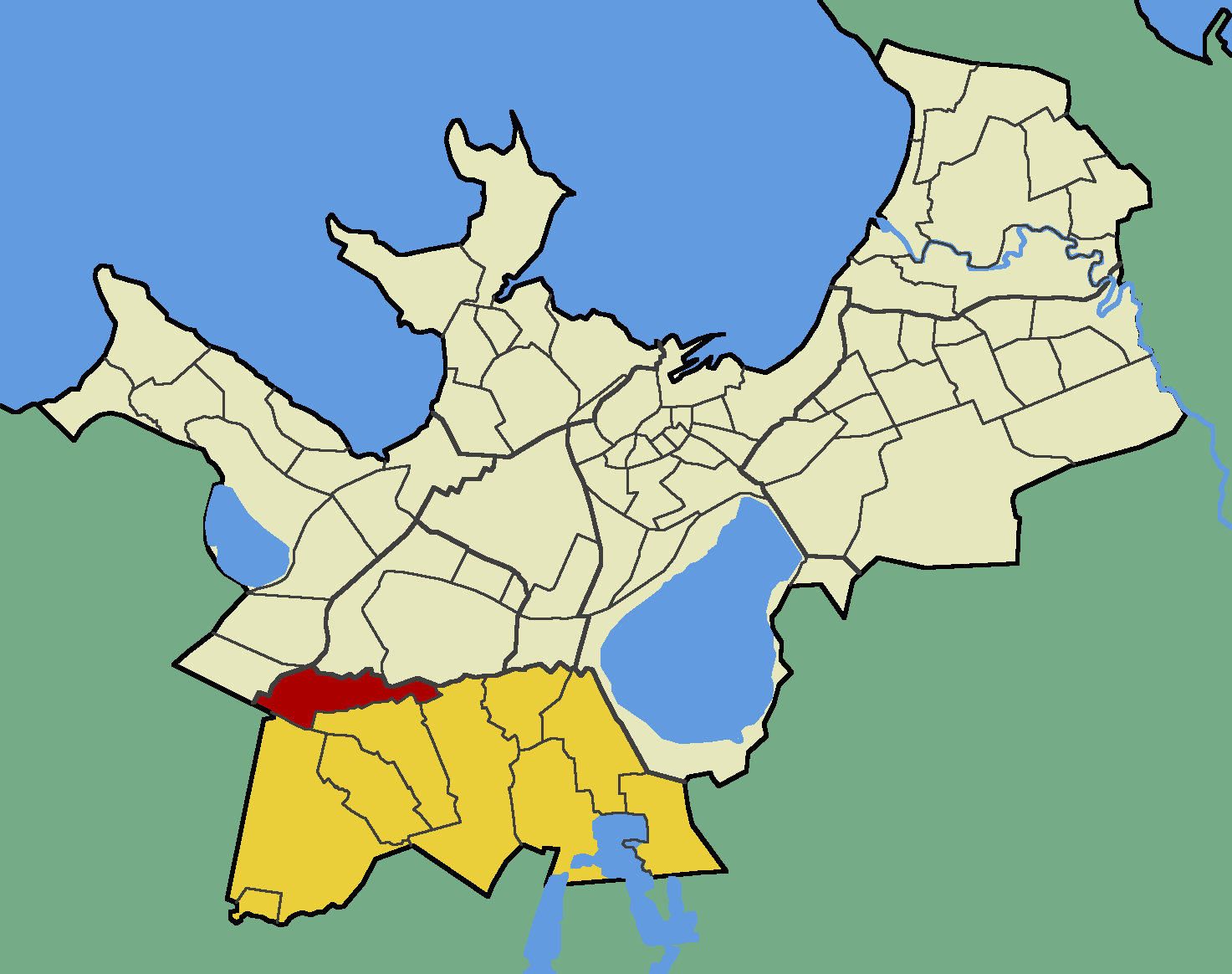
- Vana-Mustamäe within Nõmme District.
- Country: Estonia
- County: Harju County
- City: Tallinn
- District: Nõmme

Area
  - Total: 1.75 km^{2} (0.68 sq mi)

Population (01.01.2014)
  - Total: 2,066
  - Density: 1,180/km^{2} (3,060/sq mi)

Vana-Mustamäe (Estonian for "Old Black Hill") is a neighborhood of Nõmme in Tallinn, the capital of Estonia. It has a population of 2,066 (As of 1 January 2014). It borders Hiiu and Pääsküla to the south, Nõmme to the southeast, Mustamäe to the northeast, Kadaka to the north, Astangu to the northwest, and Mäeküla to the west.

It's the location of Glehn Castle (administratively in Hiiu).

== Gallery ==
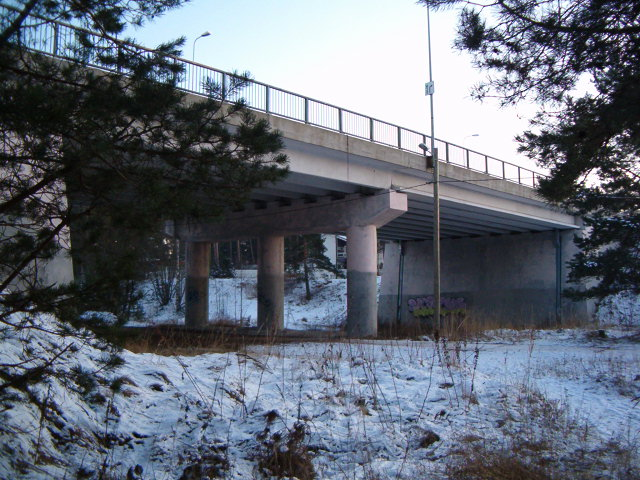

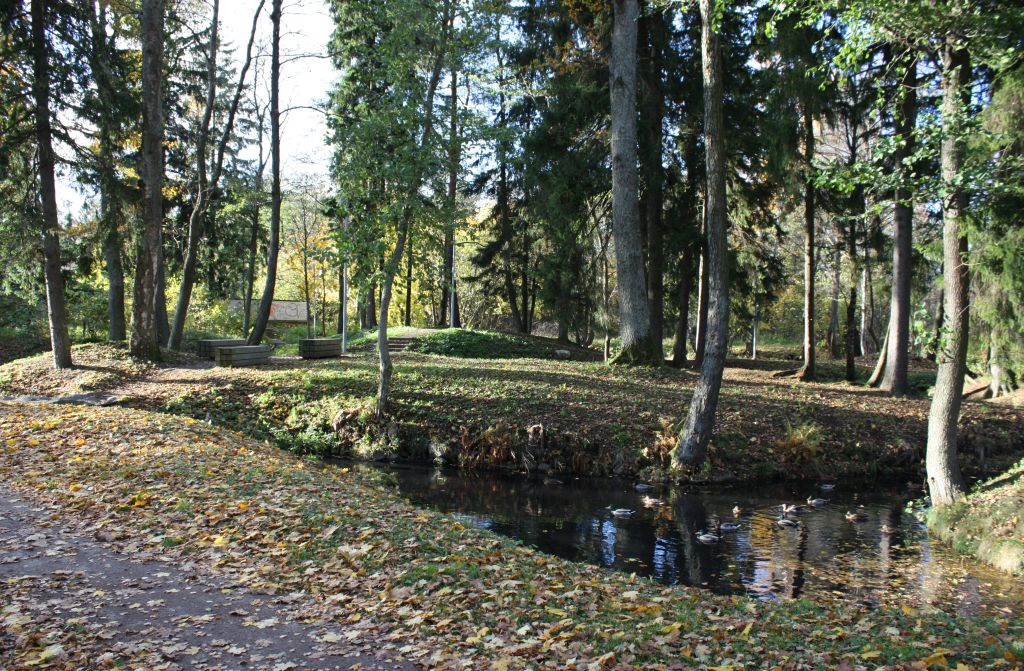
Glehn's cemetery
