= Lake Männiku =

Lake in Estonia

- Männiku järv (Estonian)
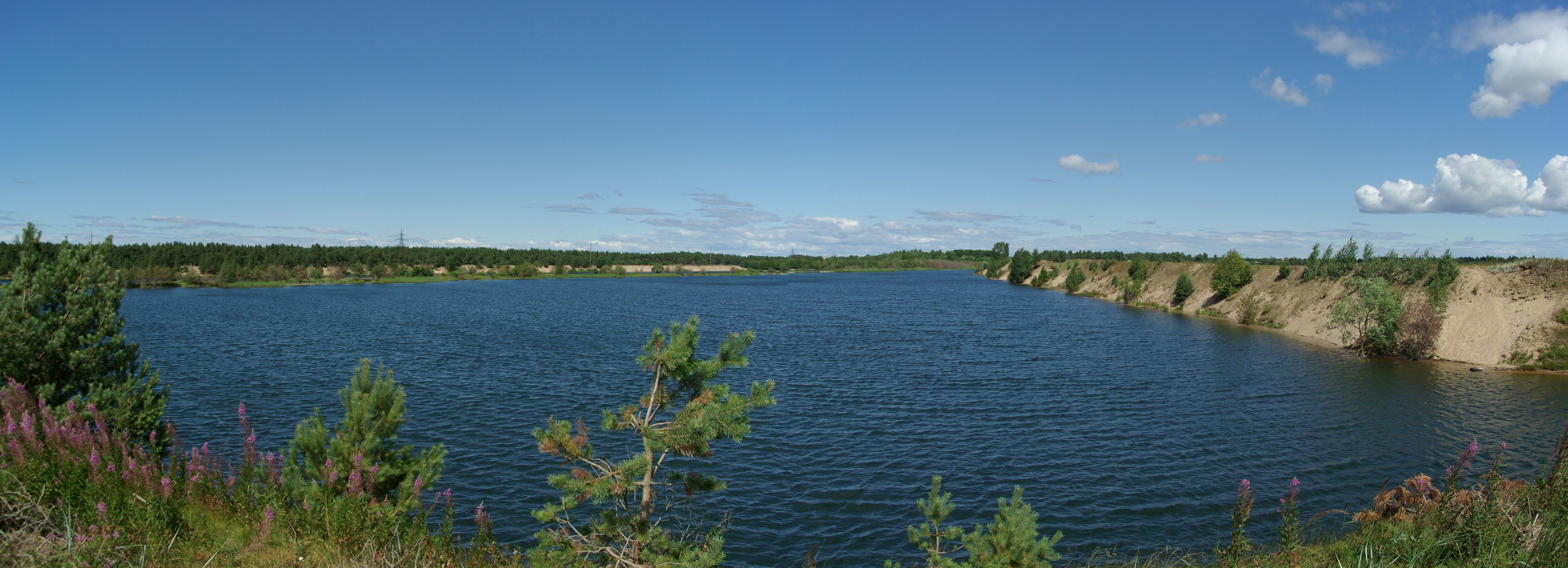

- Location within Estonia
- Coordinates: 59°20′48.24″N 24°42′49.48″E
- Basin countries: Estonia
- Max. length: 3,900 meters (12,800 ft)
- Surface area: 118.9 hectares (294 acres)
- Average depth: 5.8 meters (19 ft)
- Max. depth: 11.2 meters (37 ft)
- Water volume: 6,885,000 cubic meters (243,100,000 cu ft)
- Shore length^{1}: 9,900 meters (32,500 ft)
- Surface elevation: 42.3 meters (139 ft)
- Islands: 1
- ^{1} Shore length is not a well-defined measure.

Lake Männiku (Estonian: Männiku järv, also Männiku veehoidla, Männiku karjäär, or Suurjärv) is a lake in Estonia. It is mostly located in the village of Männiku in Saku Parish, Harju County, with a small part in Tallinn's Männiku neighborhood.

== Physical description ==
The lake has an area of 118.9 hectares (294 acres), and it has an island with an area of 0.2 hectares (0.49 acres). The lake has an average depth of 5.8 meters (19 ft) and a maximum depth of 11.2 meters (37 ft). It is 3,900 meters (12,800 ft) long, and its shoreline measures 9,900 meters (32,500 ft). It has a volume of 6,885,000 cubic meters (243,100,000 cu ft).

== See also ==
- List of lakes of Estonia
