= Nõmme =

District of Tallinn, Estonia

- District of Tallinn
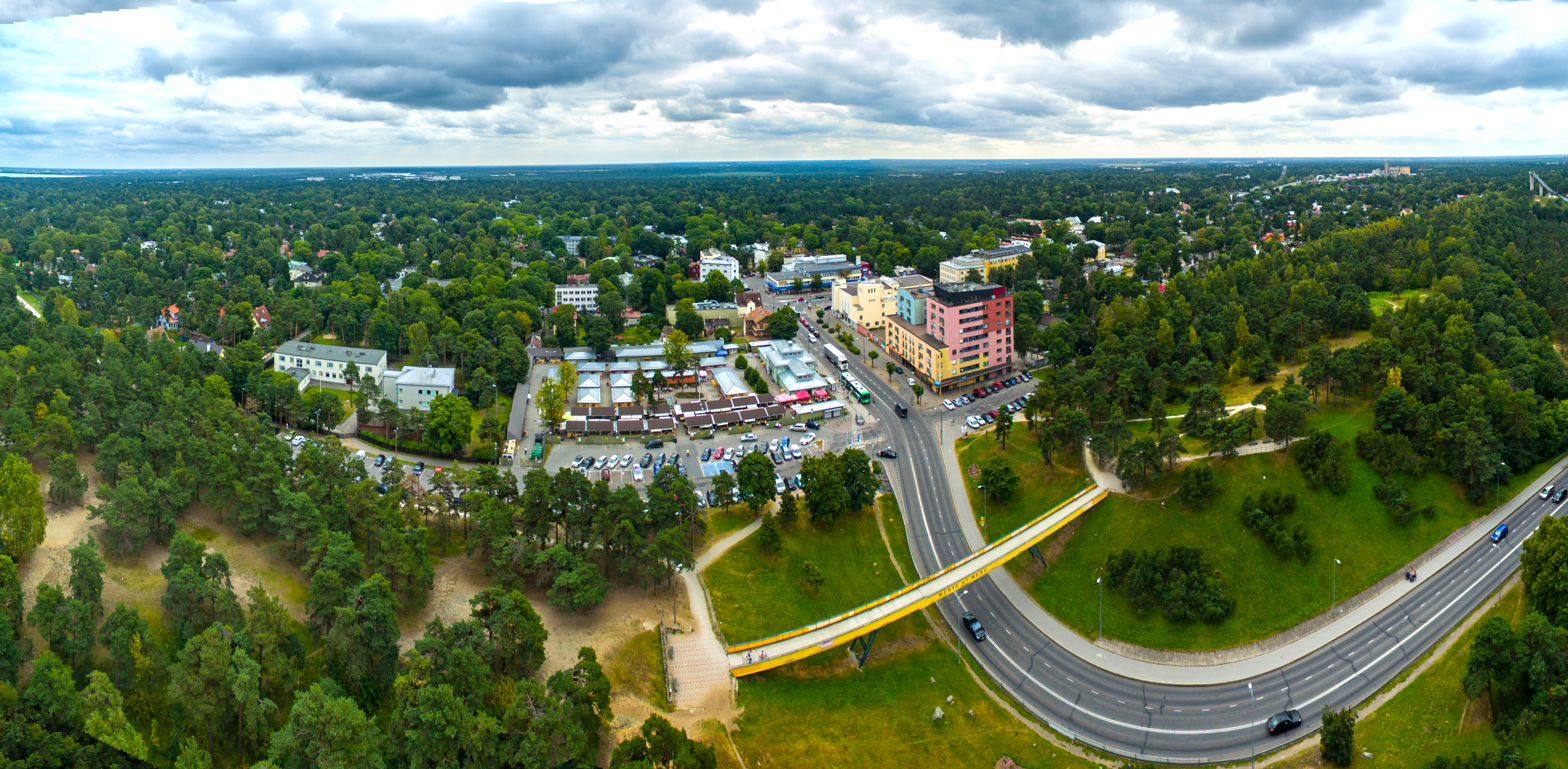
- Nõmme from above

- Flag Coat of arms

- Location of Nõmme in Tallinn.
- Coordinates: 59°22′33″N 24°40′41″E
- Country: Estonia
- County: Harju County
- City: Tallinn

Government
  - District Elder: Gerry Konnov (Isamaa)

Area
  - Total: 28.0 km^{2} (10.8 sq mi)

Population (01.08.2025)
  - Total: 37,147
  - Density: 1,330/km^{2} (3,440/sq mi)
- Website: tallinn.ee

Nõmme (Estonian for 'heath') is one of the eight administrative districts (Estonian: linnaosa) of Tallinn, the capital of Estonia. It has a population of 37,147 (As of 1 August 2025) and covers an area of 28 km^{2} (11 sq mi), population density is 1,326.7/km^{2} (3,436/sq mi). The district is largely a middle-class, suburban area, mostly consisting of listed private homes from the 1920s and 1930s and is sometimes referred to as the "Forest Town."

== History ==
Nõmme was founded by Nikolai von Glehn, the owner of Jälgimäe Manor, in 1873 as a summerhouse district. The development started around the railway station. In 1926 it was granted town rights, but in the beginning of the Soviet occupation in 1940, it was merged with Tallinn and remains as one of the eight districts of Tallinn to date.

There are many historical sights in Nõmme, such as Glehn Castle, the sculpture Kalevipoeg (also known as "Glehn's Devil"), the Victoria Palace cinema, and Nõmme Market. Other important sights include Vanaka Hill, the ski jumping tower, Rahumäe cemetery, and Pääsküla Bog.

== Geography ==
Nõmme is divided into 10 subdistricts (Estonian: asum): Hiiu, Kivimäe, Laagri, Liiva, Männiku, Nõmme, Pääsküla, Rahumäe, Raudalu, and Vana-Mustamäe.

== Transport ==
There are six railway stations in Nõmme on the western route of Elron: Rahumäe, Nõmme, Hiiu, Kivimäe, Pääsküla, and Laagri. The western route of former Edelaraudtee passes through Liiva station and the railway stop Valdeku in Männiku.

== Sports ==
Nõmme is home to two professional football clubs: Nõmme Kalju FC and FC Nõmme United. The fixture between the two clubs is known as the Nõmme derbi.

Sports facilities in Nõmme include football grounds Hiiu Stadium and Männiku Stadium, Nõmme Snow Park, Nõmme Sports Centre and Nõmme 'Forus' Tennis Centre.

== Population ==
As of 1 August 2025, Nõmme has a population of 37,147.

Ethnic composition 1989-2021
Ethnicity	1989		2000		2011		2021	
Ethnicity	amount	%	amount	%	amount	%	amount	%
Estonians	31837	72.5	30423	81.8	30484	86.0	29405	84.8
Russians	9285	21.1	5053	13.6	3819	10.8	3657	10.5
Ukrainians	-	-	-	-	388	1.09	453	1.31
Belarusians	-	-	-	-	178	0.50	137	0.40
Finns	-	-	-	-	109	0.31	138	0.40
Jews	-	-	-	-	44	0.12	35	0.10
Latvians	-	-	-	-	28	0.08	69	0.20
Germans	-	-	-	-	22	0.06	48	0.14
Tatars	-	-	-	-	27	0.08	29	0.08
Poles	-	-	-	-	41	0.12	39	0.11
Lithuanians	-	-	-	-	43	0.12	46	0.13
unknown	0	0.00	201	0.54	26	0.07	121	0.35
other	2782	6.34	1526	4.10	254	0.72	503	1.45
Total	43904	100	37203	100	35463	100	34680	100

Population development
Year	2004	2005	2006	2007	2008	2009	2010	2011	2012	2013	2014	2015	2016	2017	2018	2019
Population	37,772	39,102	39,436	38,856	38,725	38,428	38,100	38,275	38,898	39,049	39,487	39,501	39,448	39,357	39,538	39,422

== Image gallery ==
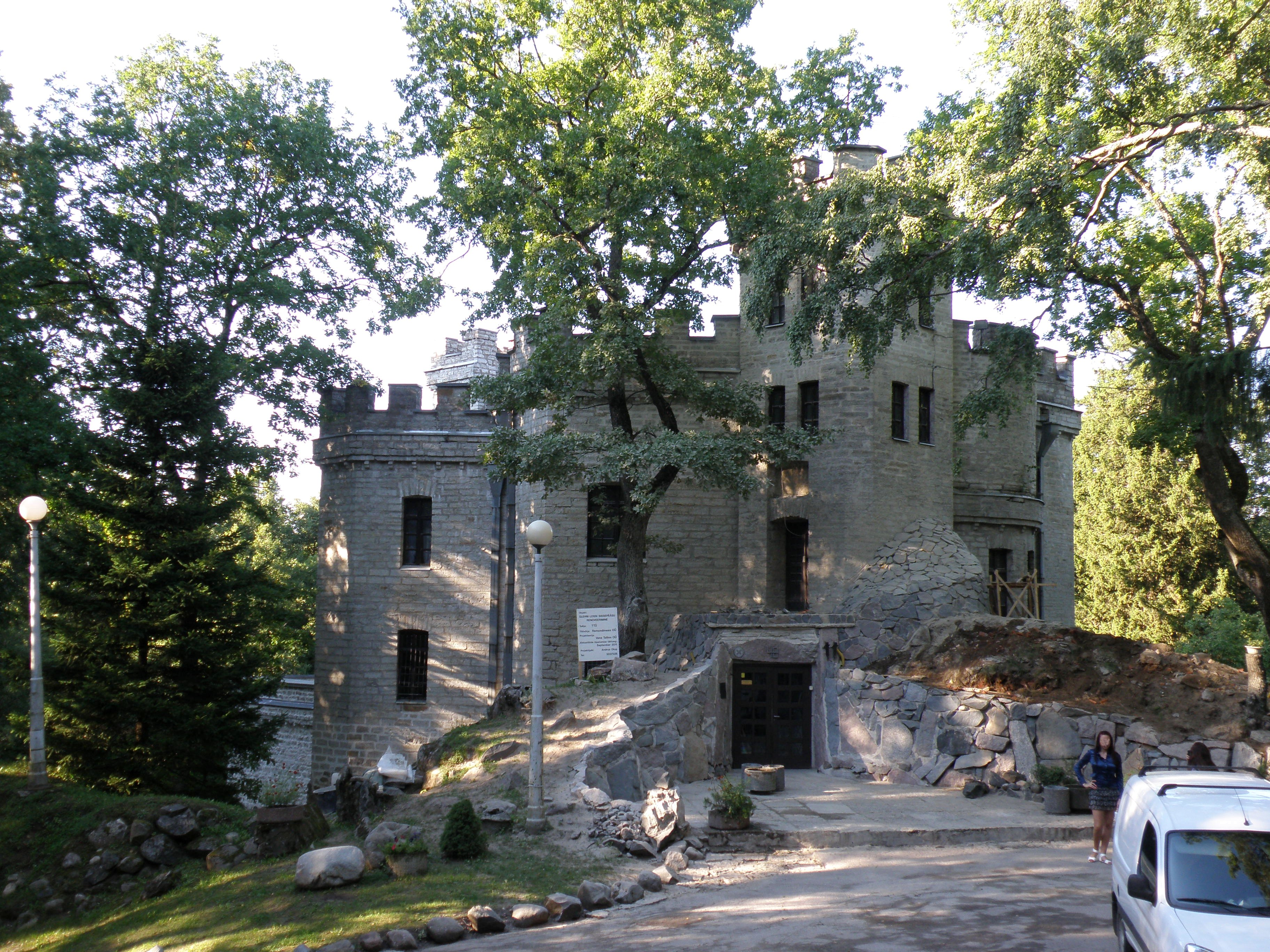
Glehn Castle

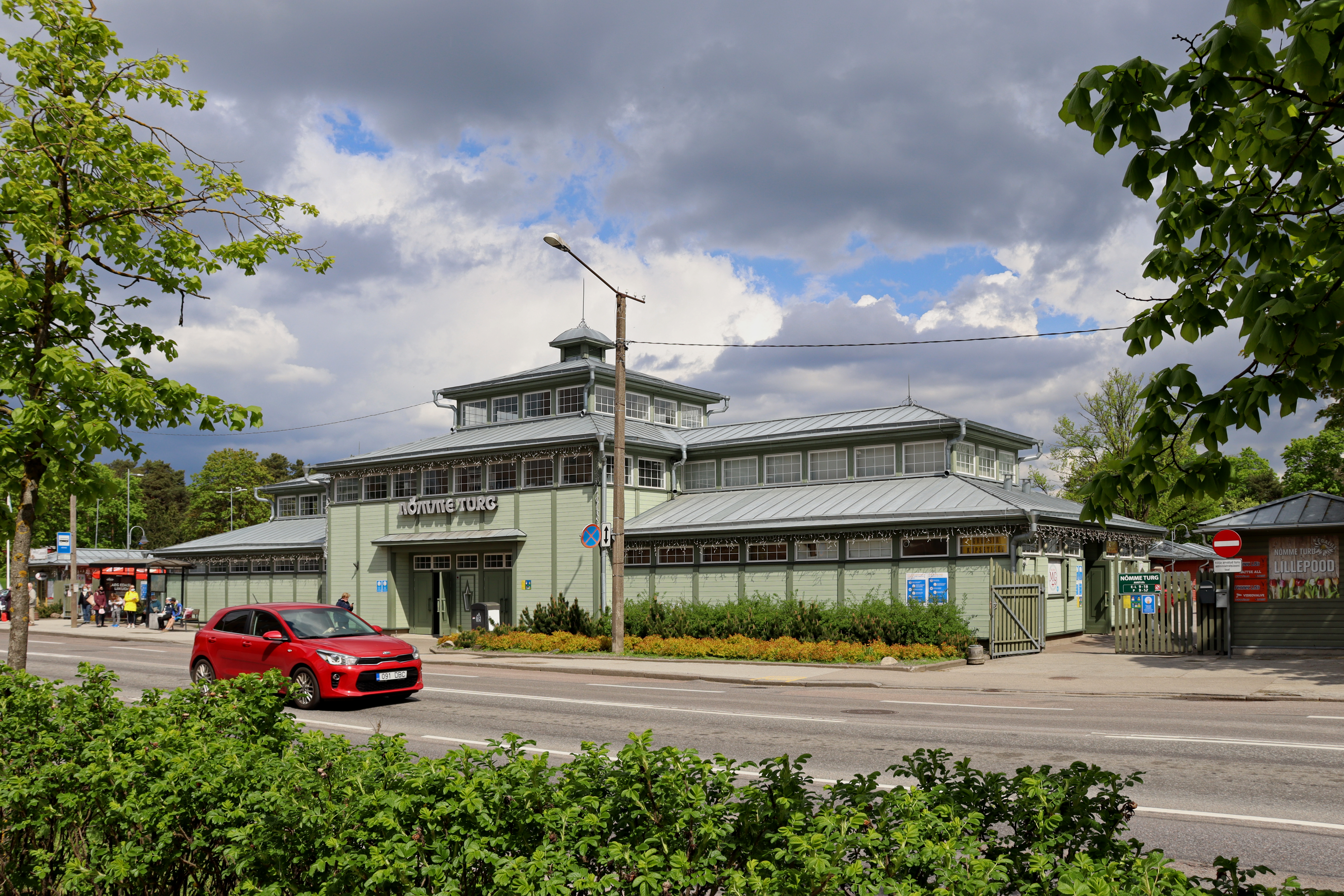
Nõmme market

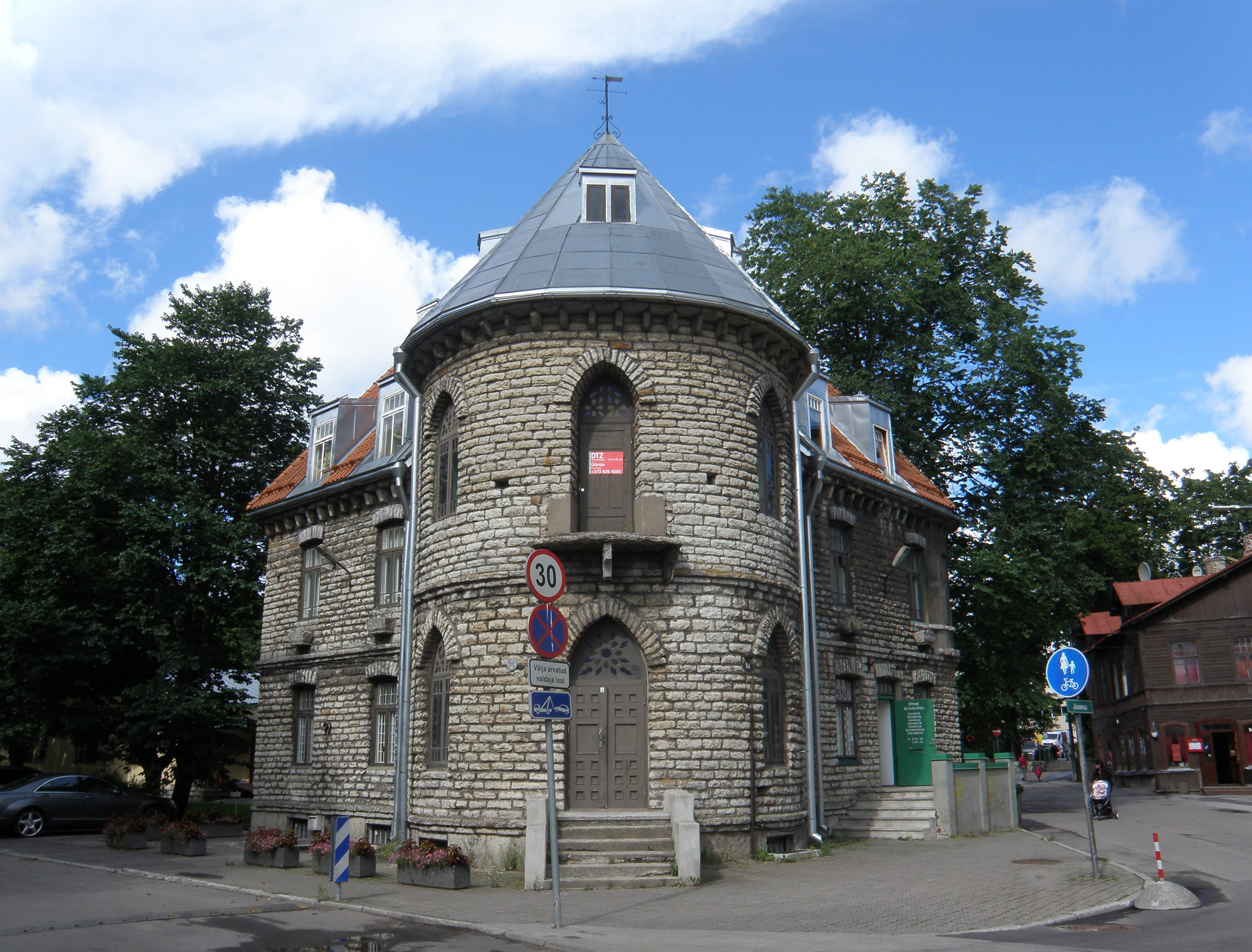
Former post office

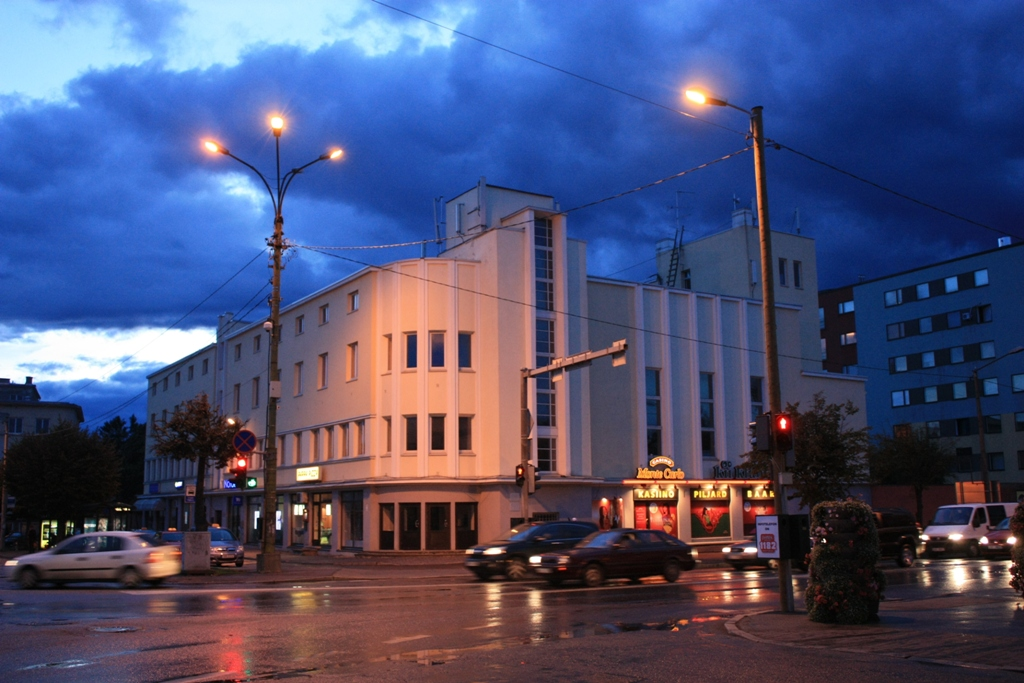
Nõmme center

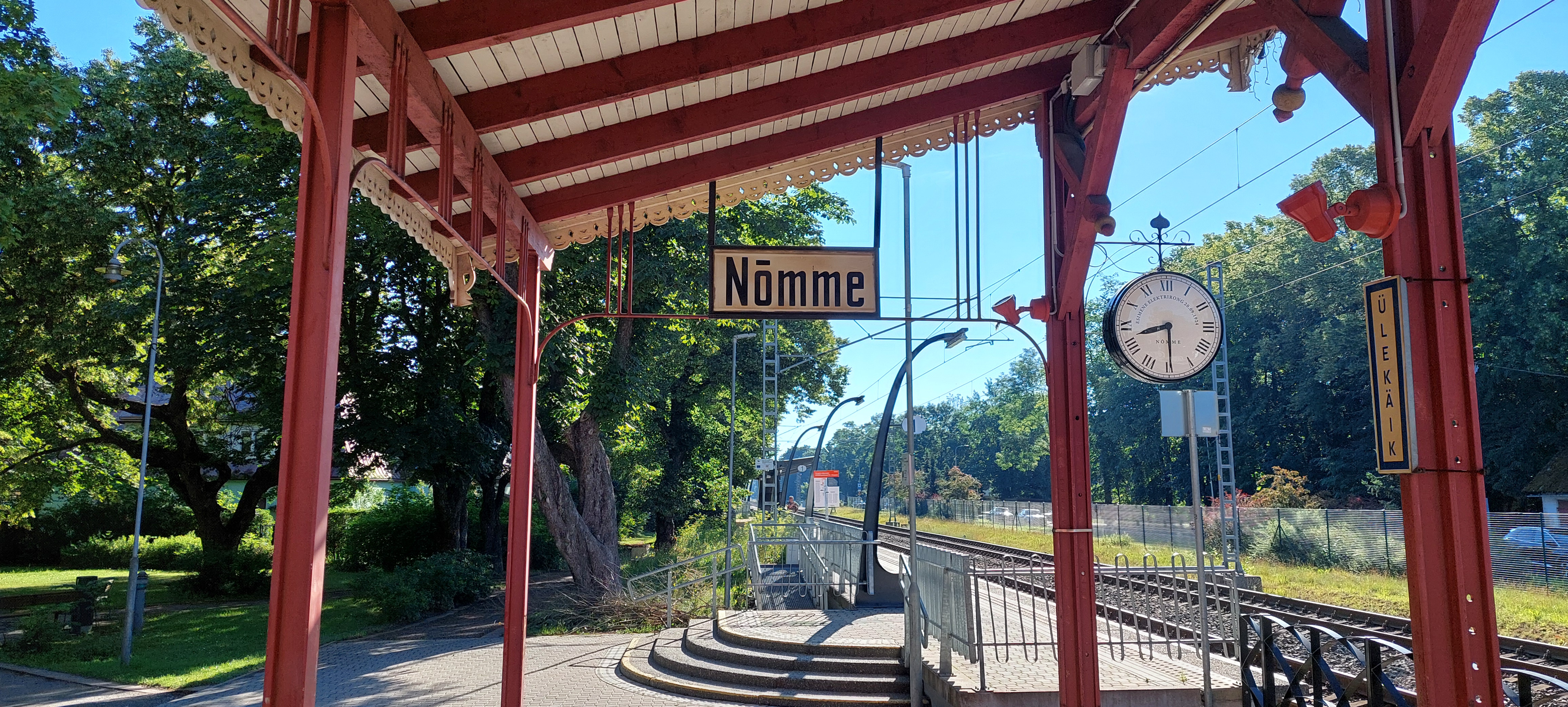
Nõmme railway station

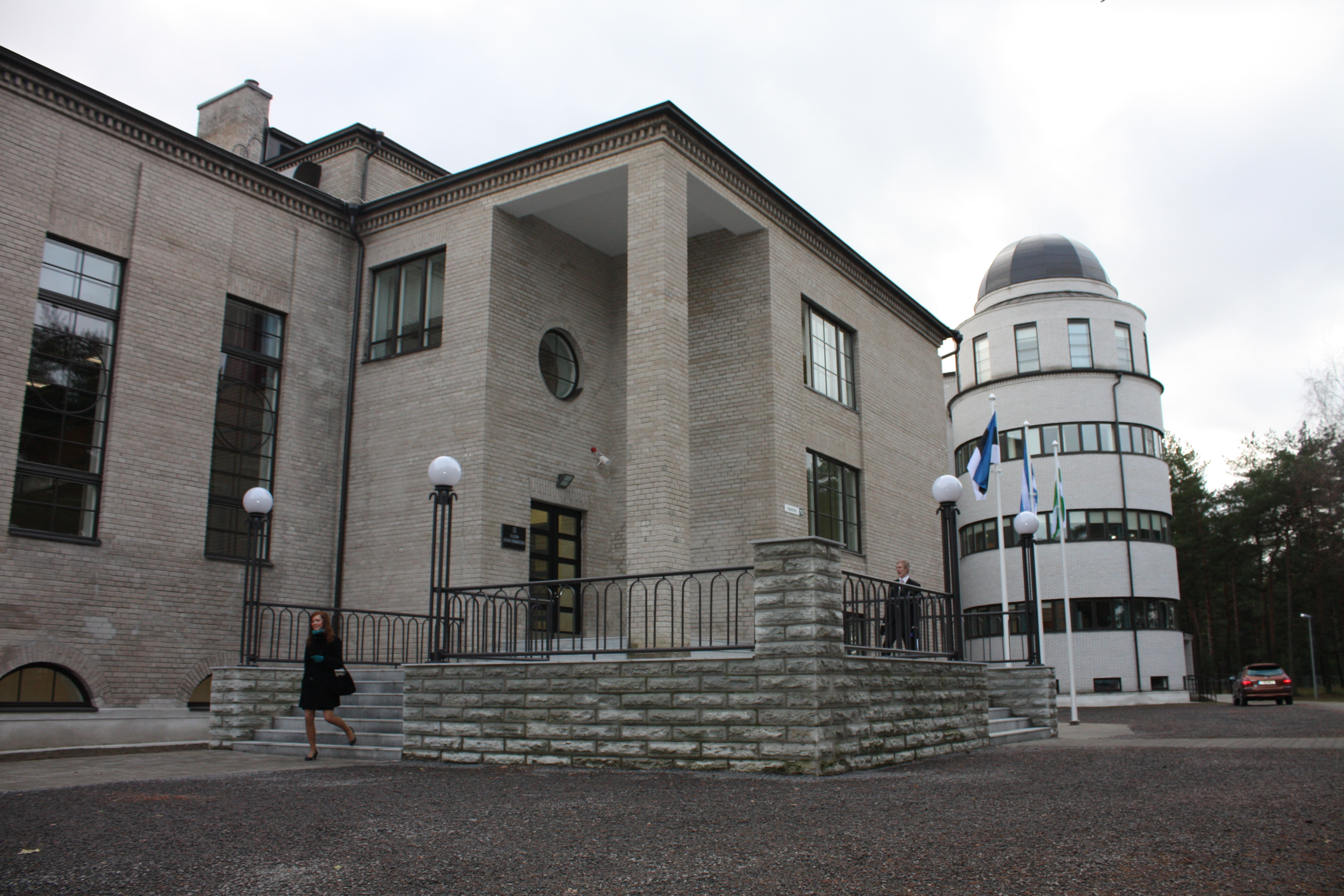
Nõmme Gymnasium (secondary school)

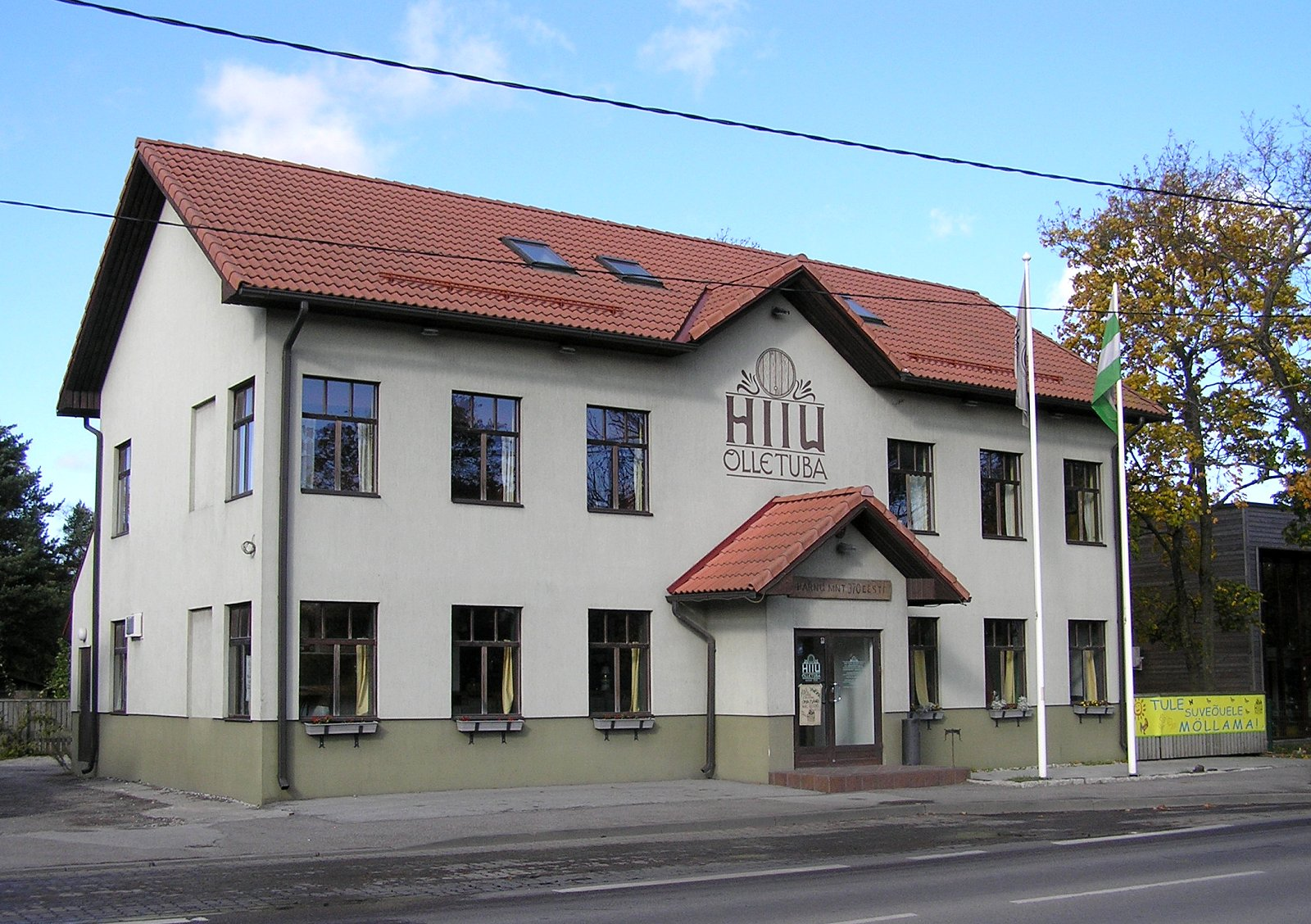
Hiiu Õlletuba pub

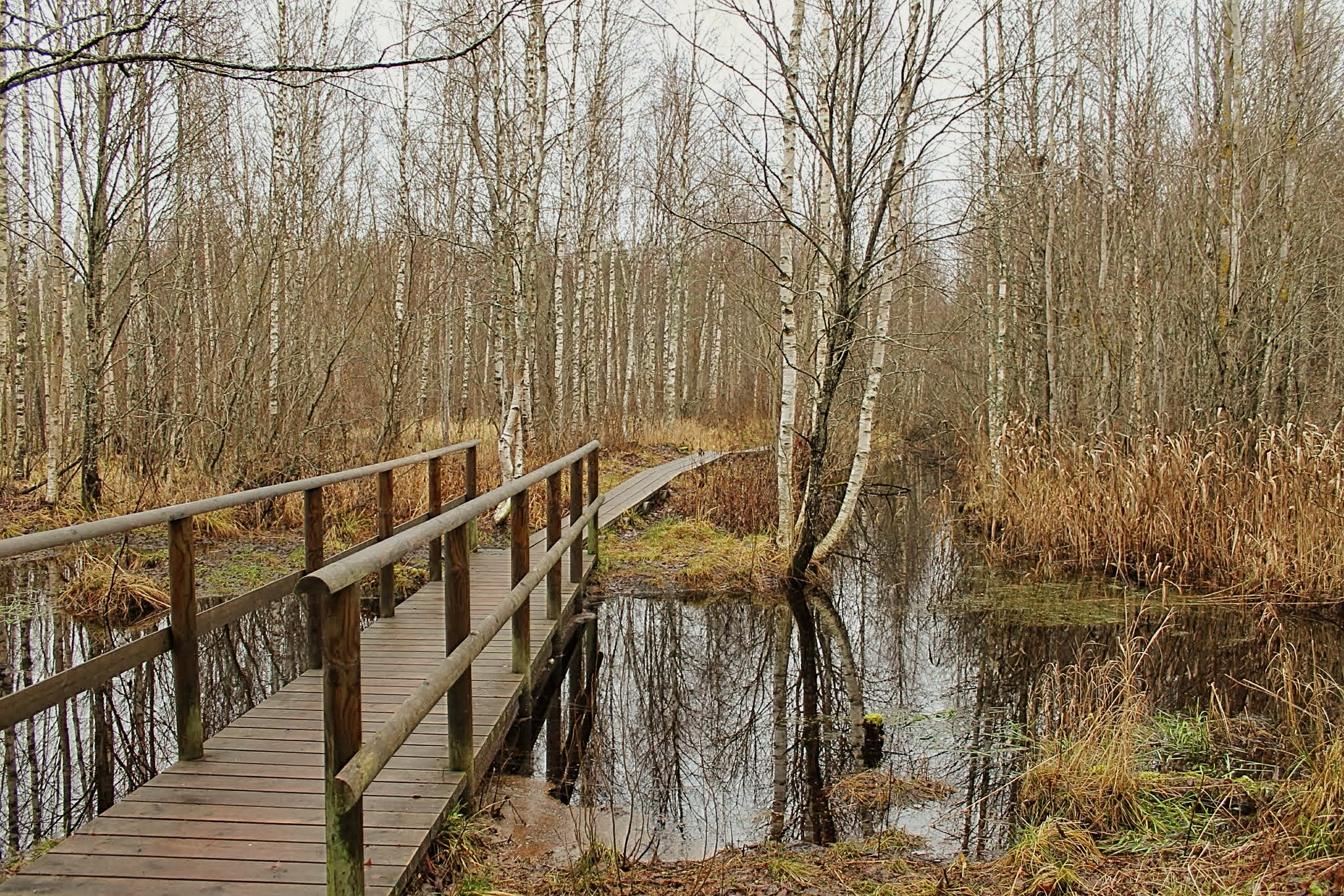
Pääsküla bog

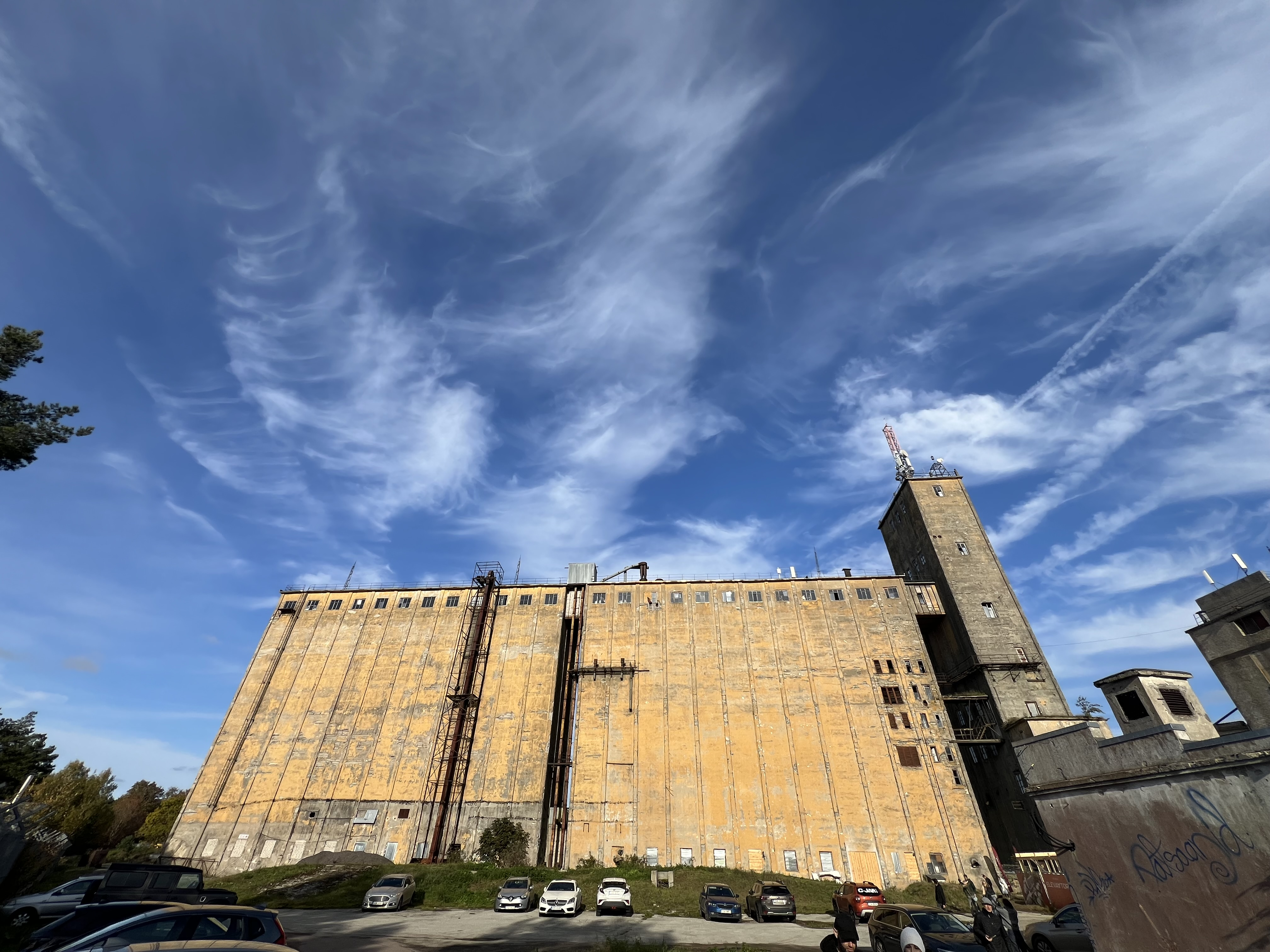
Nõmme grain elevator

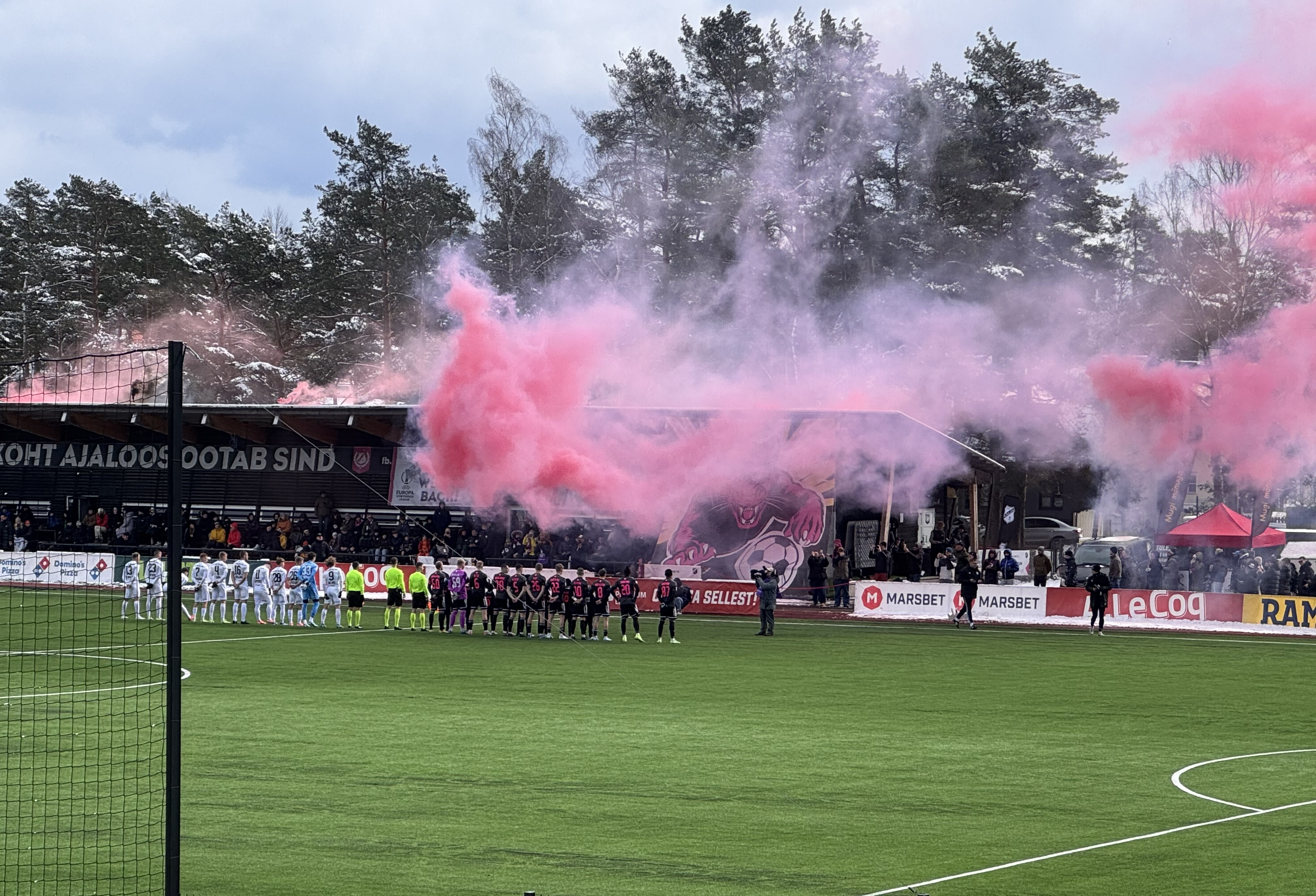
Hiiu Stadium
