= Hiiu =

Subdistrict of Tallinn, Estonia

Coordinates: 59.38366°N 24.671903°E

- Subdistrict of Tallinn
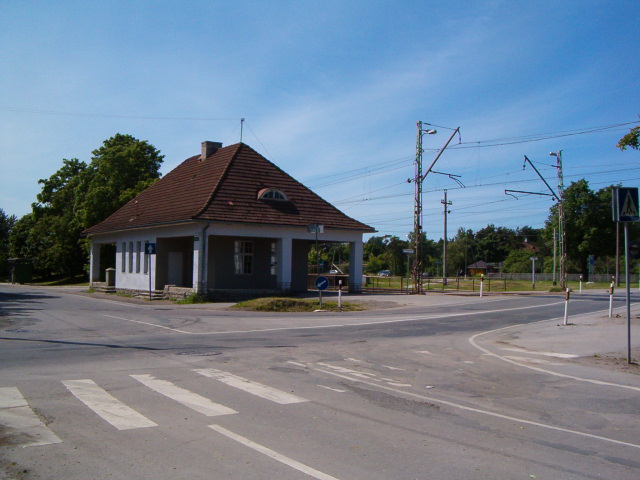
- Hiiu train station

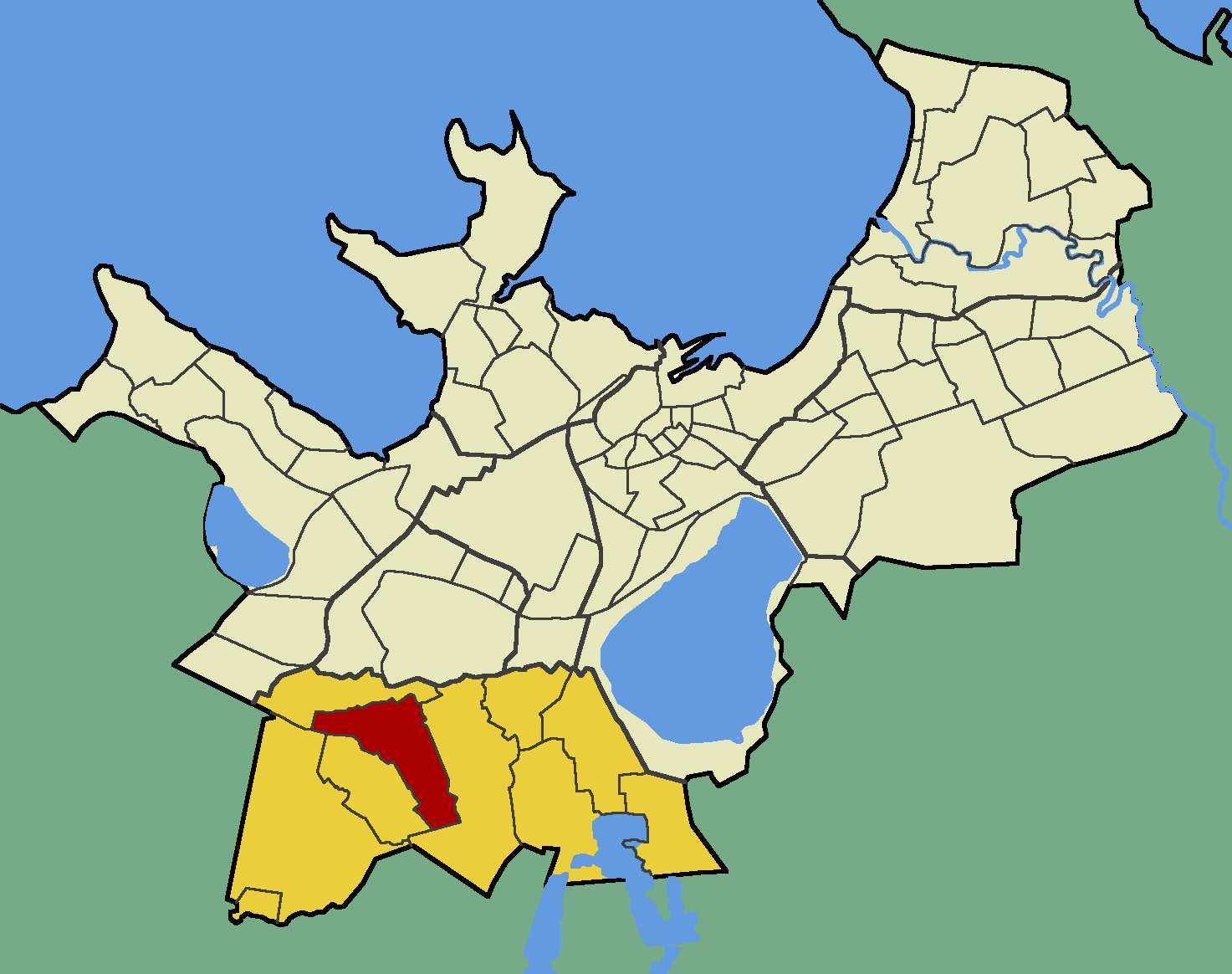
- Hiiuwithin Nõmme District.
- Country: Estonia
- County: Harju County
- City: Tallinn
- District: Nõmme

Area
  - Total: 2.50 km^{2} (0.97 sq mi)

Population (01.01.2015)
  - Total: 3,986
  - Density: 1,590/km^{2} (4,130/sq mi)

Hiiu is a subdistrict (Estonian: asum) in the district of Nõmme, Tallinn, the capital of Estonia. It covers an area of 2.50 km^{2} (0.97 sq mi) and has a population of 3,986 (As of 1 January 2015), population density is 1,556/km^{2} (4,031/sq mi).

Hiiu has a station on the Elron western route. The first narrow gauge railway station was built to Hiiu in 1913.

== Gallery ==
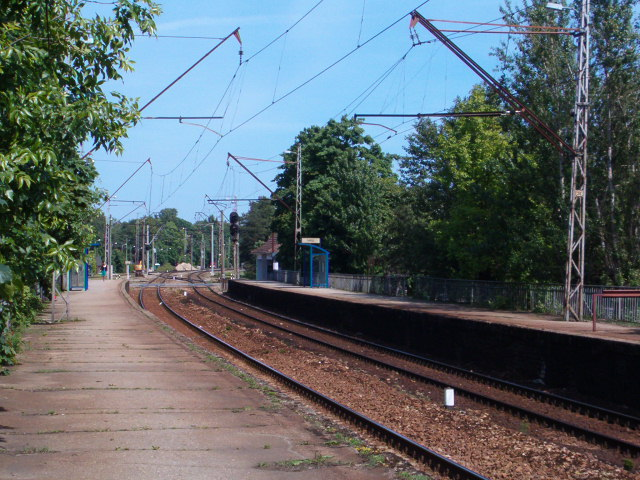
Hiiu train station

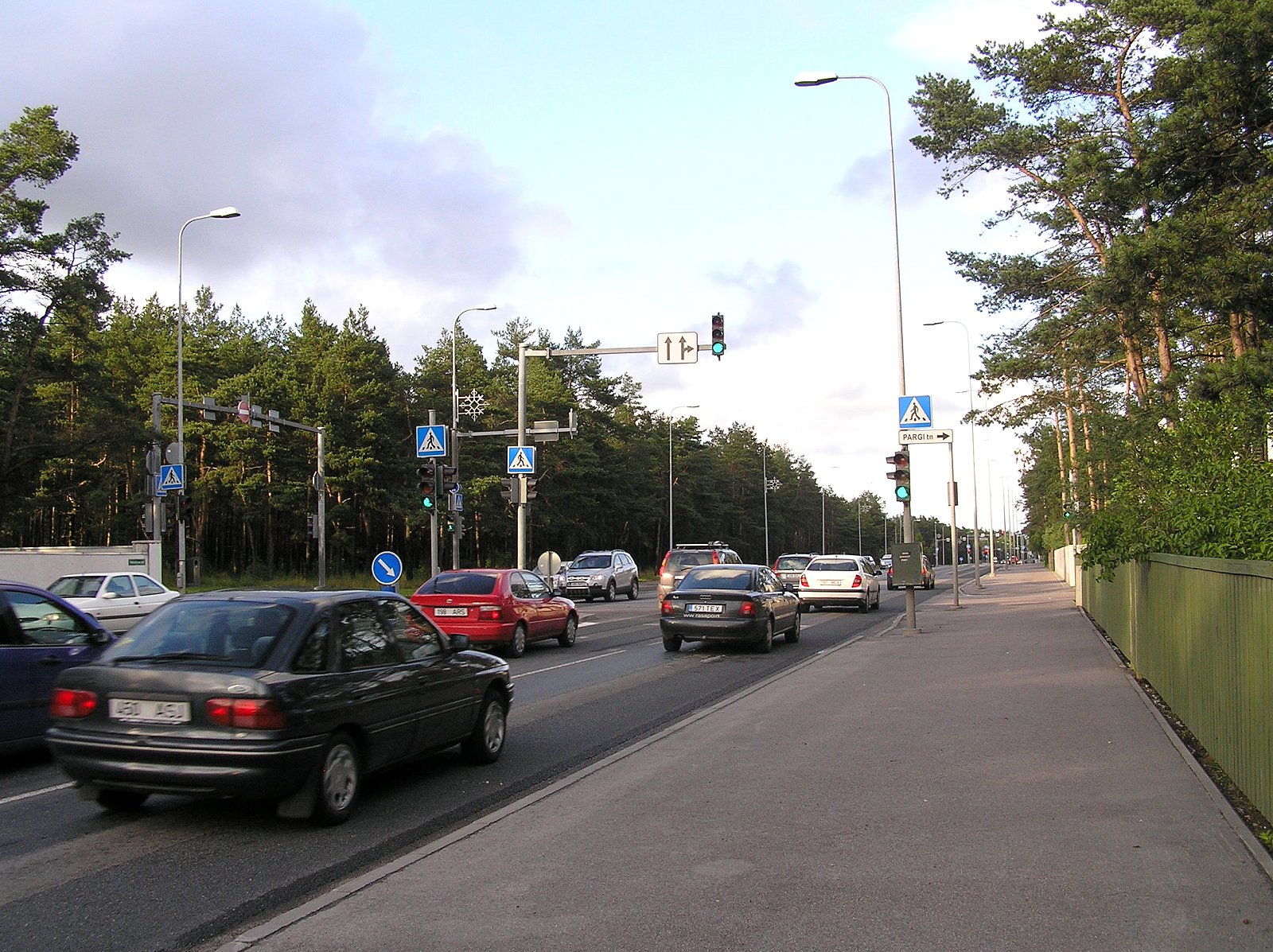
Vabaduse puiestee, the main road of Nõmme District in Hiiu.

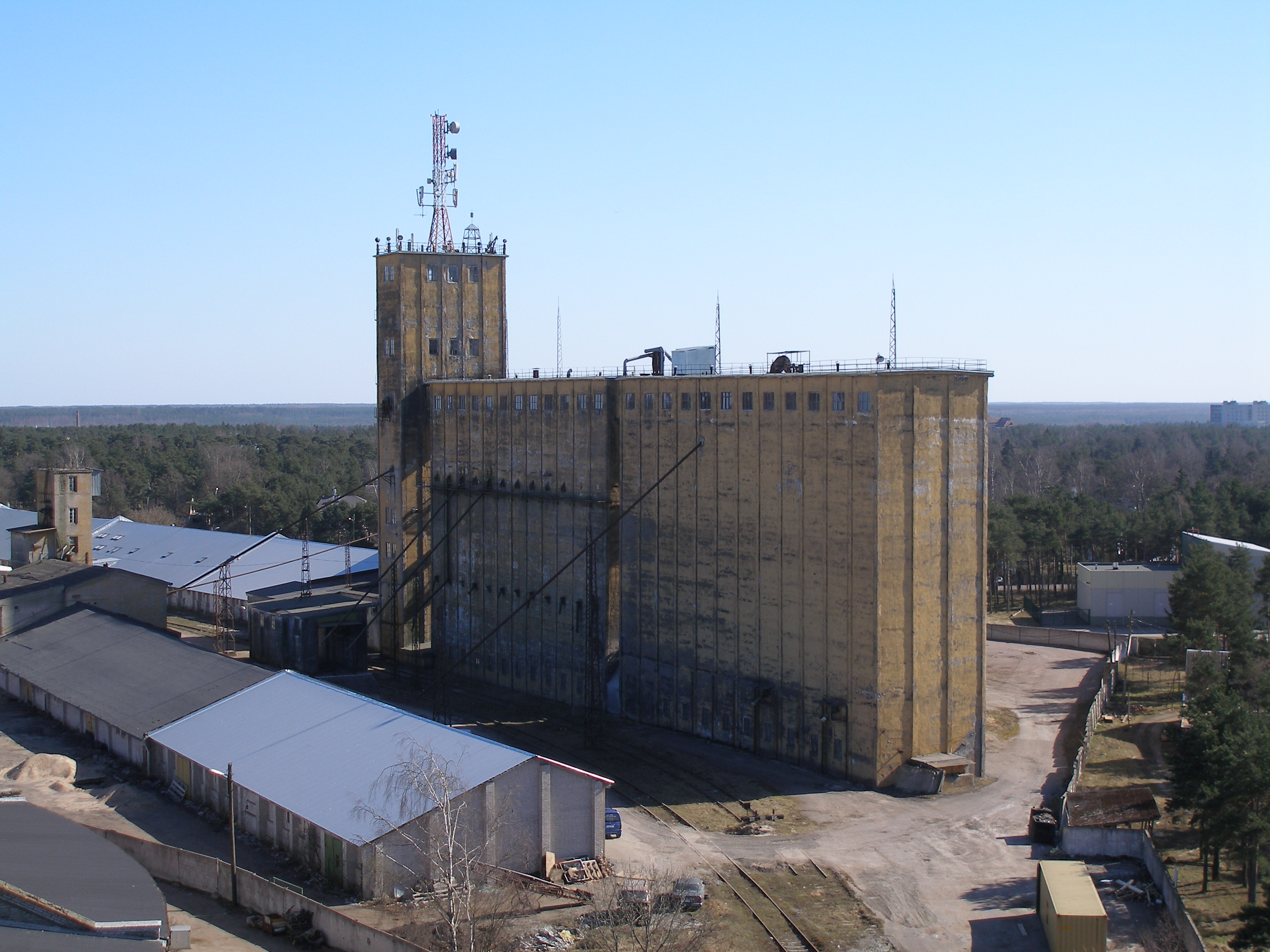
Grain elevator

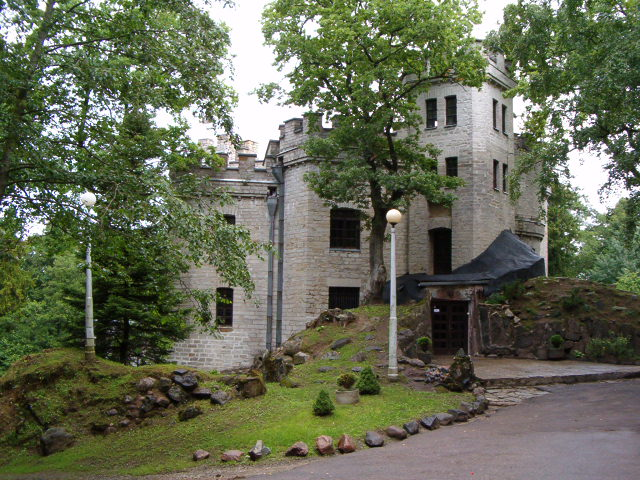
Glehn Castle

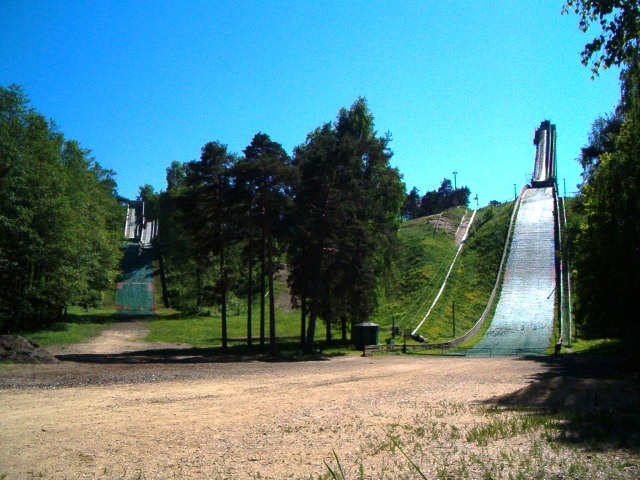
Mustamäe ski jumping hill

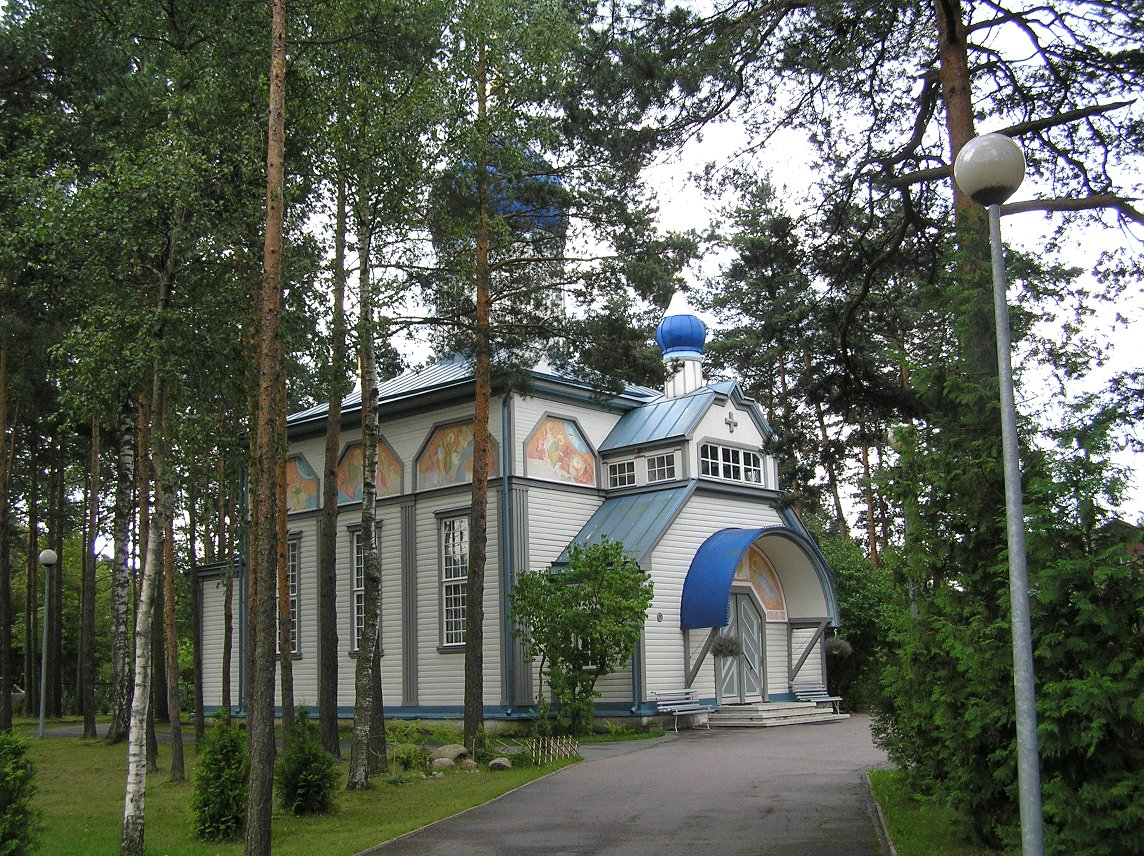
Nõmme St. John the Forerunner Orthodox Church

== See also ==
- Hiiu Stadium

Preceding station	Elron	Following station
Nõmme towards Tallinn	Tallinn–Turba/Paldiski	Kivimäe towards Turba, Kloogaranna or Paldiski
