= Liiva, Tallinn =

Subdistrict of Tallinn, Estonia

Coordinates: 59.387955°N 24.723637°E

Liiva
- Subdistrict of Tallinn
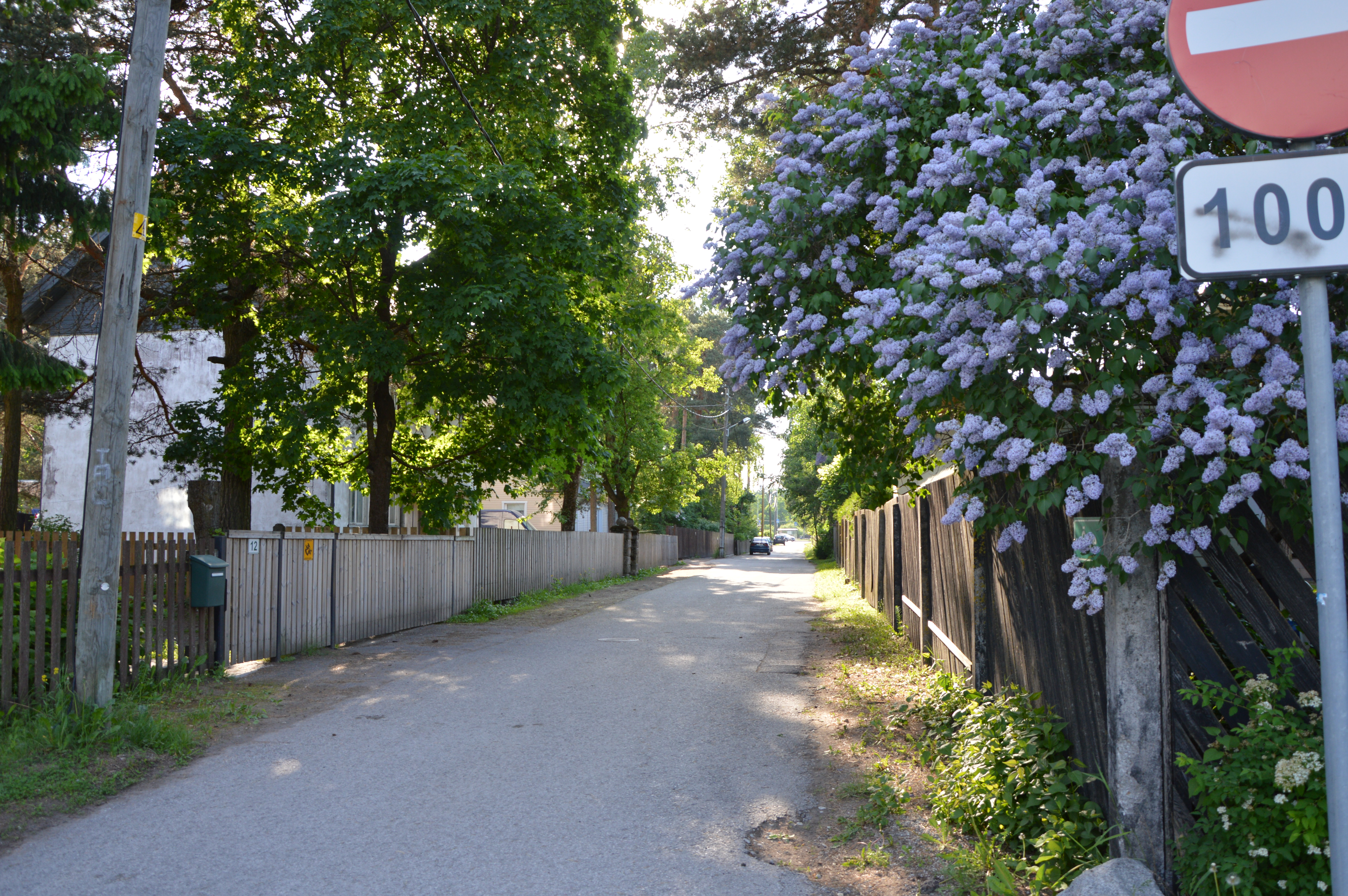
- Õnne street in Liiva with trees and blooming lilac shrubs

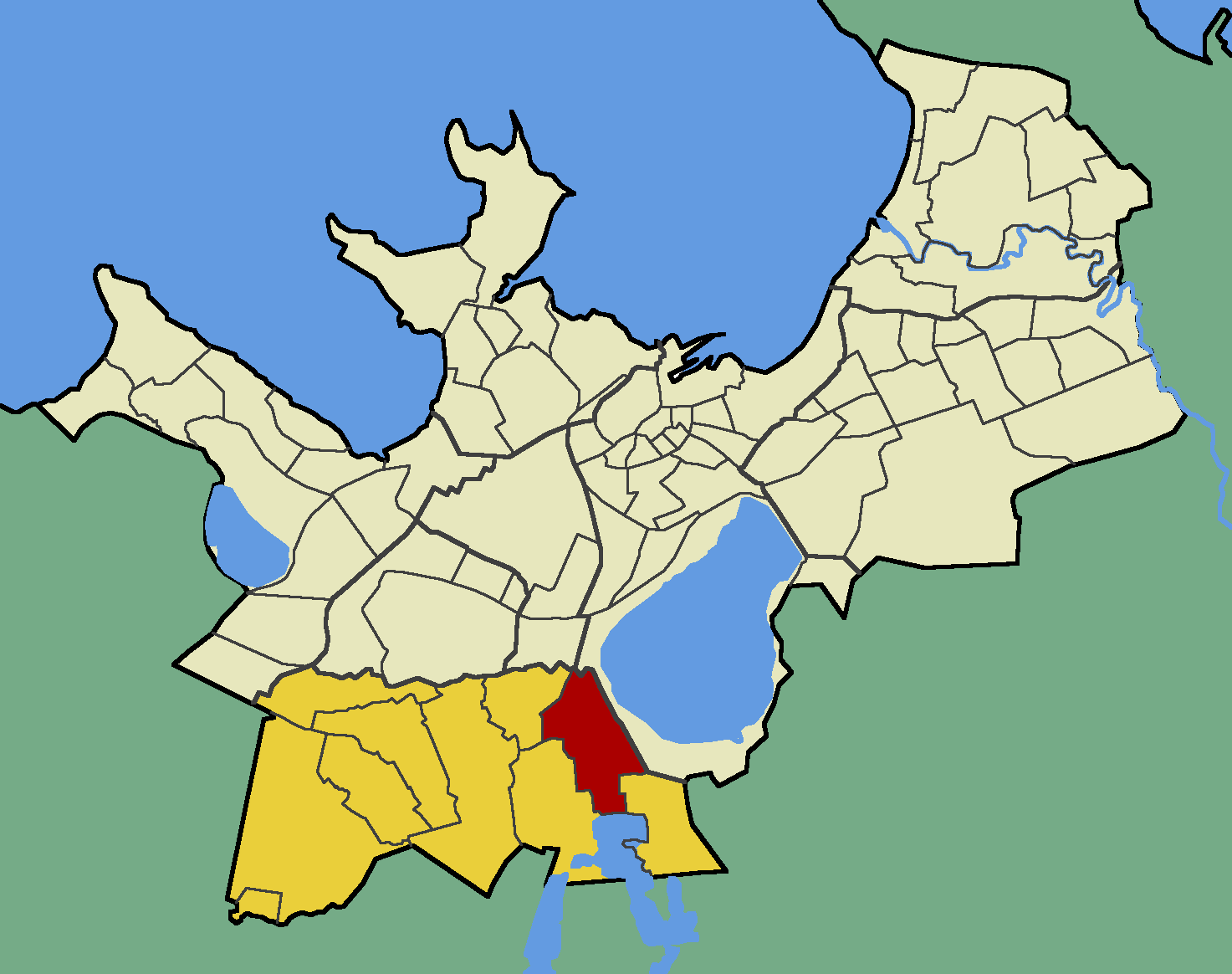
- Liiva within Nõmme District
- Country: Estonia
- County: Harju County
- City: Tallinn
- District: Nõmme

Area
  - Total: 2.64 km^{2} (1.02 sq mi)

Population (01.01.2022)
  - Total: 1,309
  - Density: 496/km^{2} (1,280/sq mi)

Liiva (Estonian for "Sand") is a subdistrict (Estonian: asum) in the district of Nõmme, Tallinn, the capital of Estonia. It covers an area of 3.25 km^{2} (1.25 sq mi) and has a population of 1,365 (as of 1 January 2022) of which 90 % are Estonian and 3 % are Russian, with a population density of 495.8/km^{2} (1,284.2/sq mi).

Average monthly gross income per employee was 1805 € at the beginning of 2022, placing it 6th out of 10 in Nõmme and slightly above the average of Tallinn.

== Points of interest ==
Most of the subdistrict is covered by Liiva cemetery. Oravamäe park, 3 ha in size, is also located in Liiva.

== History ==
=== 19th century and prior ===
Until the end of 19th century, Liiva was still mostly covered by a pine forest, with several larger roads passing through it, such as the road to Pärnu, Raudalu Road (now known as Viljandi Road) and the smaller forest road going to Saku manor.

A pub known as Risti ("Cross" or "Crossing" in Estonian) or Vanaristi ("Old Crossing") was located where the roads met, and a couple hundreds meters away at Raudalu Road was the Liiva pub. This pub was already mentioned in the atlas of Livonia published by Ludwig August Mellin in 1798, and gave the location its name.

=== 20th century ===
In 1900, works for the narrow-gauge railway line between Tallinn and Viljandi reached Liiva, and before World War One the Liiva railway station was opened, although at first only as railway hub for Peter the Great's Naval Fortress. Passengers could only start using it in 1925, in the same year a post office was also opened.

The company AS Liiva-Betoon had already opened near the railway station two years before in 1923, and produced hollow concrete blocks, roof tiles and other construction materials.

In 1925, Liiva cemetery was opened, with a part of it segmented off for the congregation of Nõmme some years later.

The 4th brigade of Nõmme Fire Service built in 1932 their own fire station with money they had gathered through collections. While the house is still standing, it no longer serves its originally intended function.

== Culture ==
The Liiva Village Society has been active since 2011.

== Transport ==
Liiva has a railway station on the Tallinn - Viljandi railway line operated by Elron (rail transit), with all trains in both directions stopping at it.

Additionally, city bus lines 18, 18A, 5, 32 and 57 pass through it.

== Gallery ==
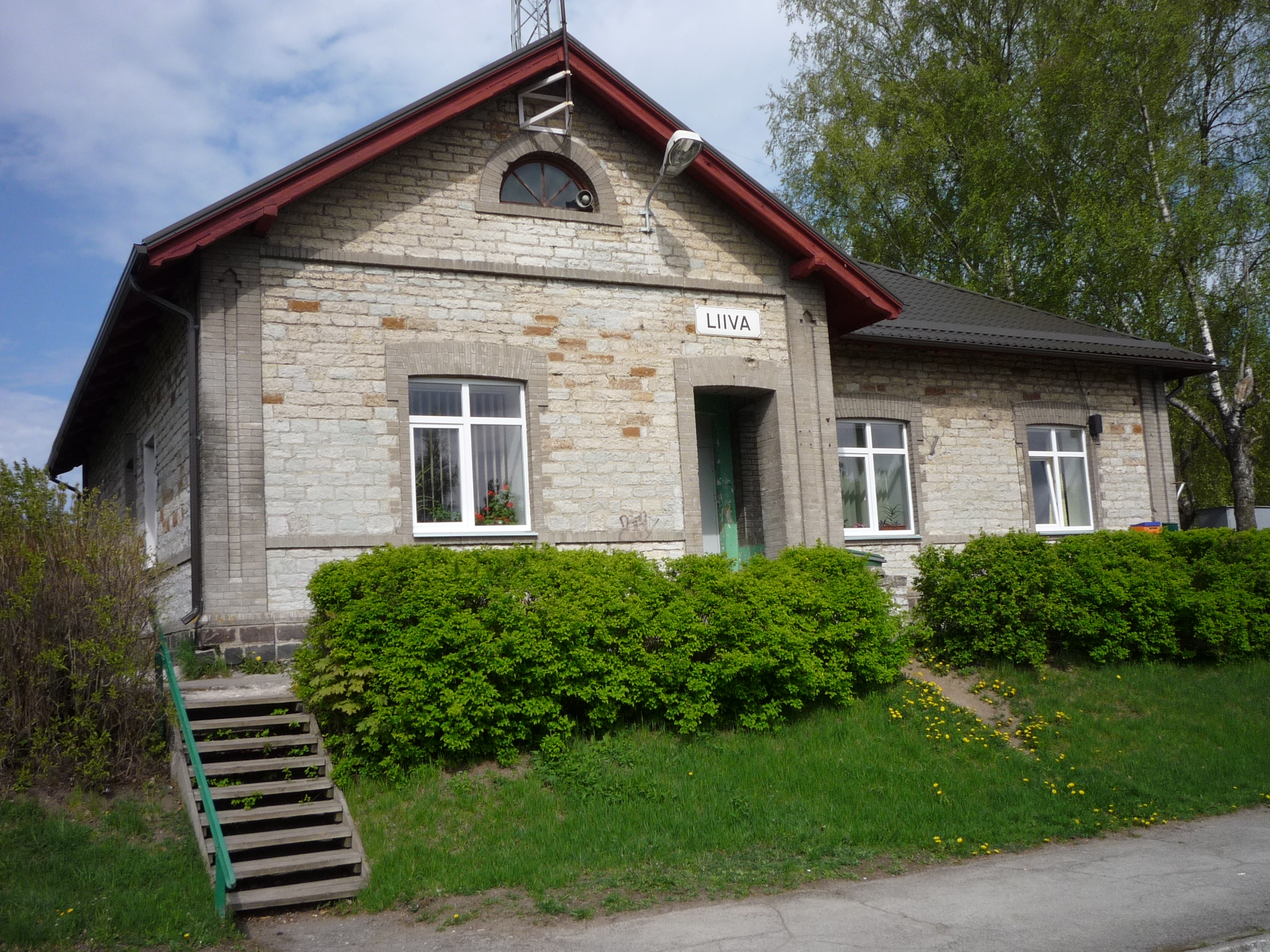
Liiva railway station

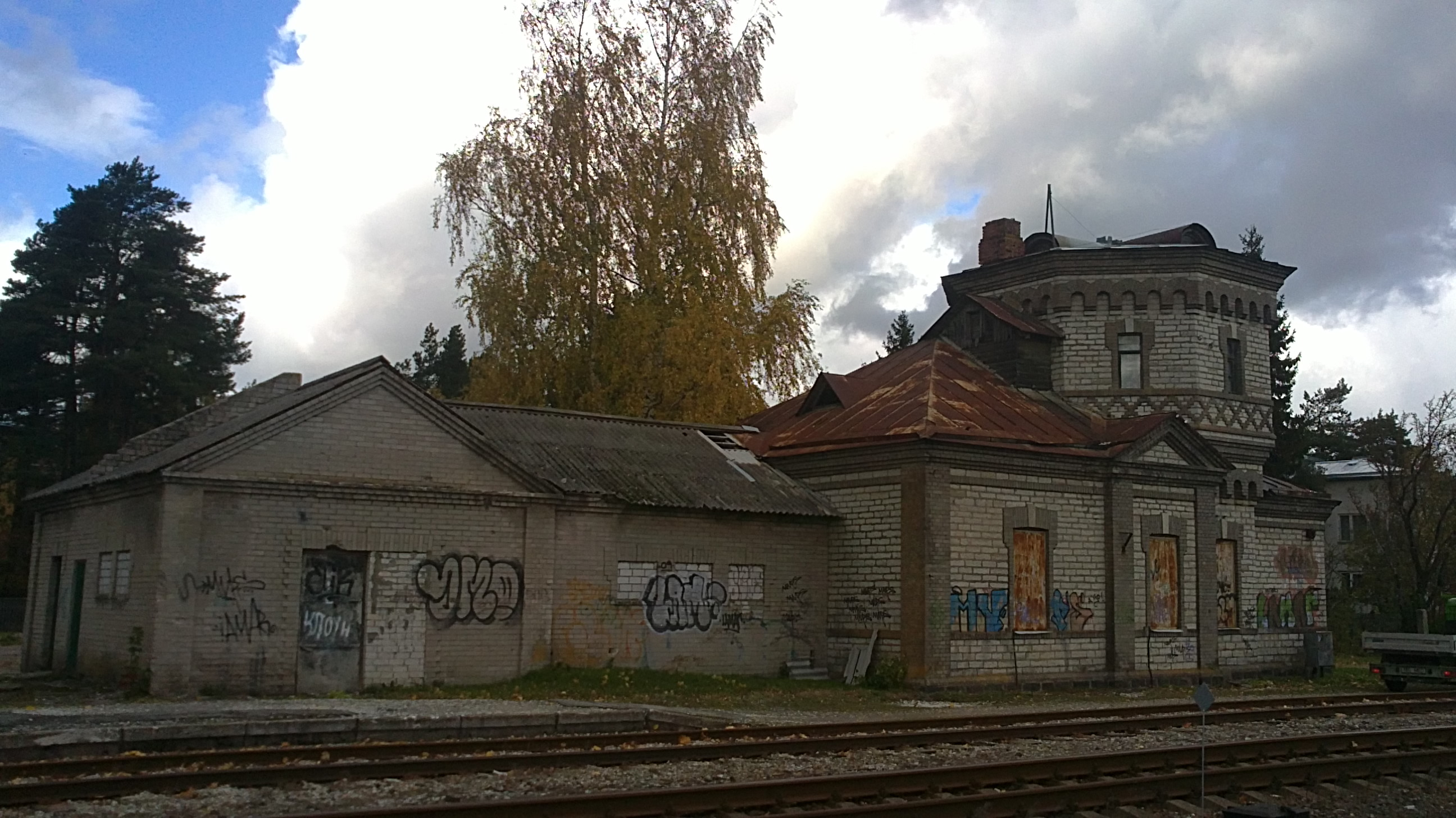
Water tower in railway station

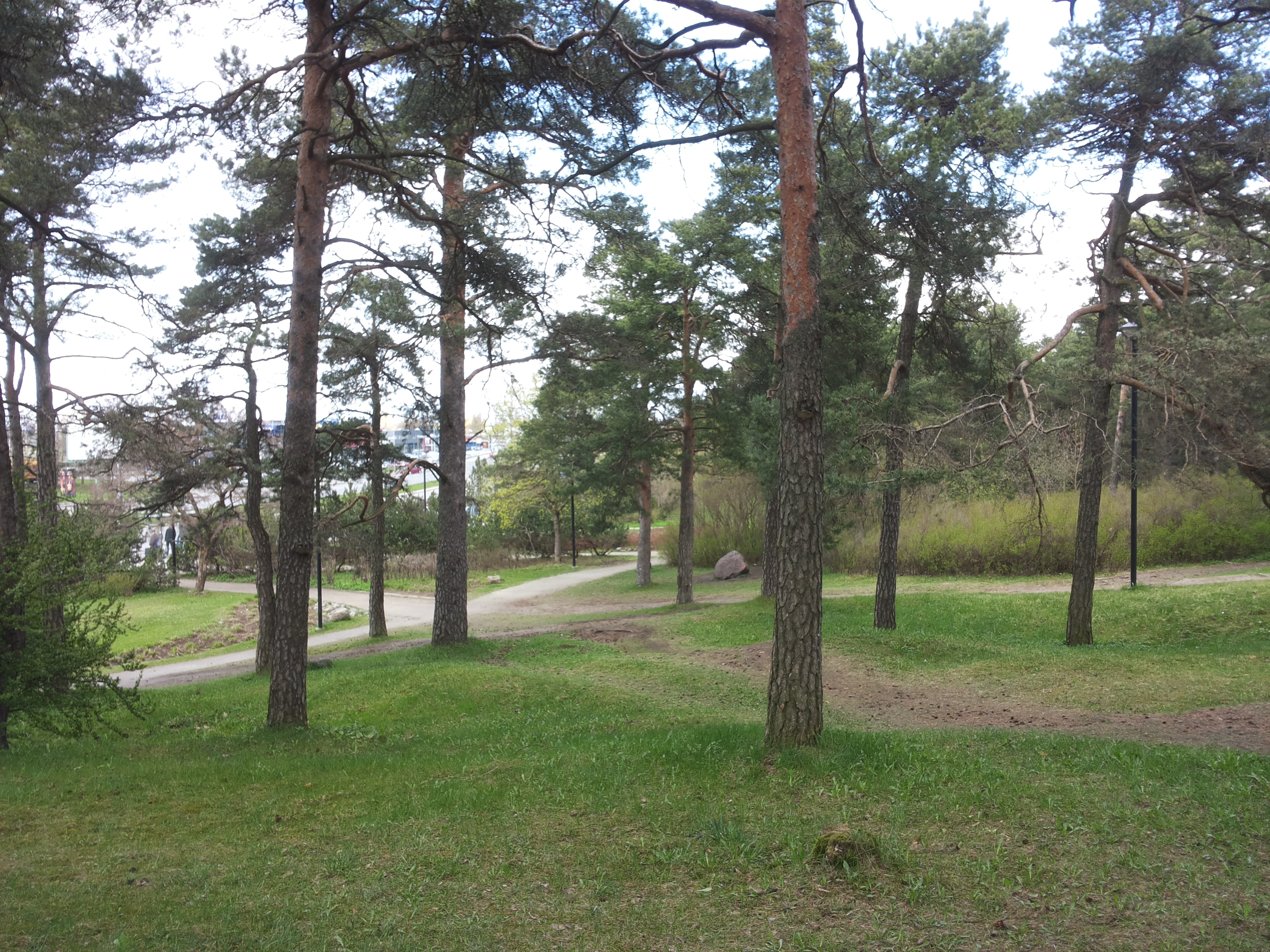
Oravamäe park

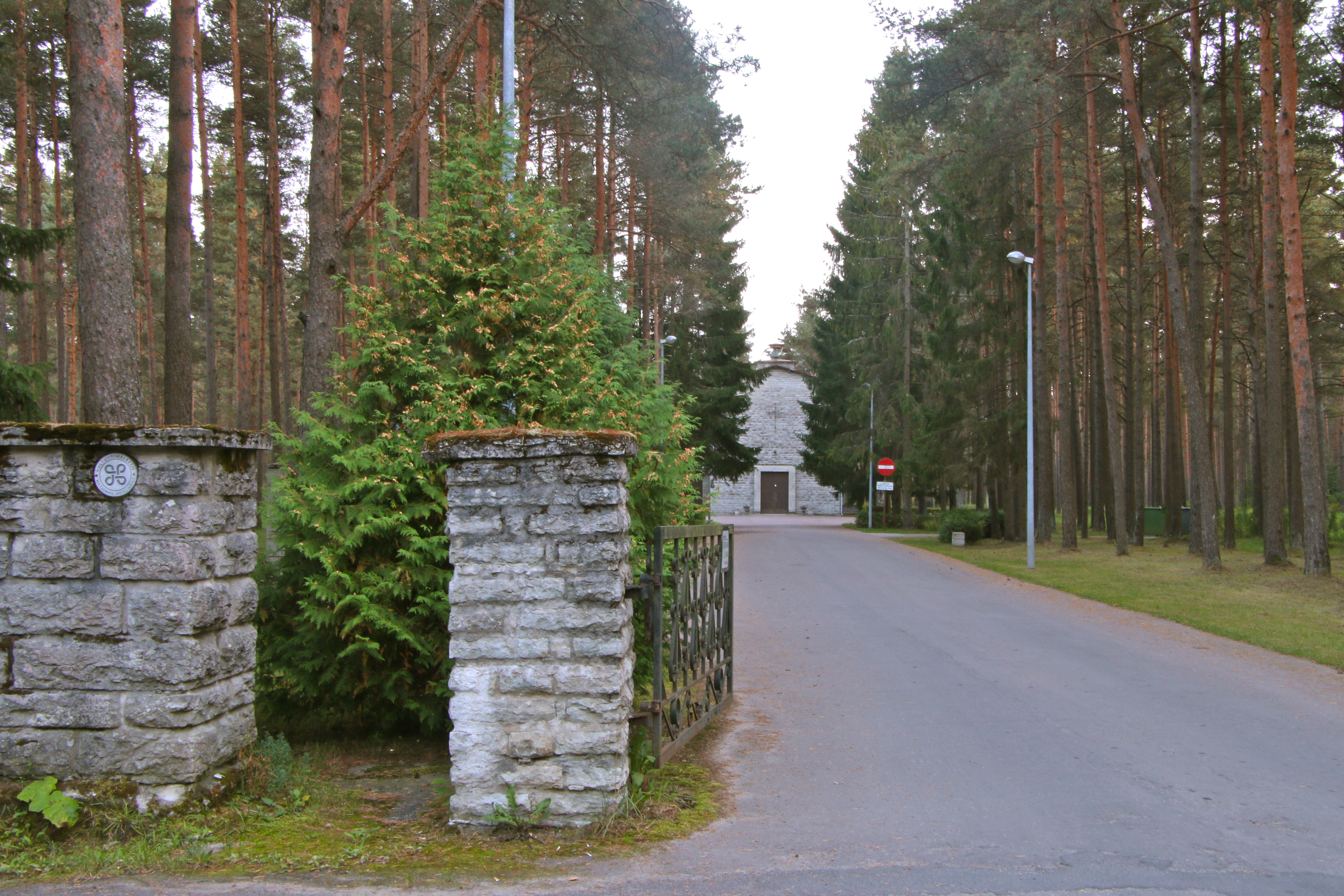
