= Männiku, Tallinn =

Subdistrict of Tallinn, Estonia

Coordinates: 59.375277°N 24.718122°E

Männiku
- Subdistrict of Tallinn
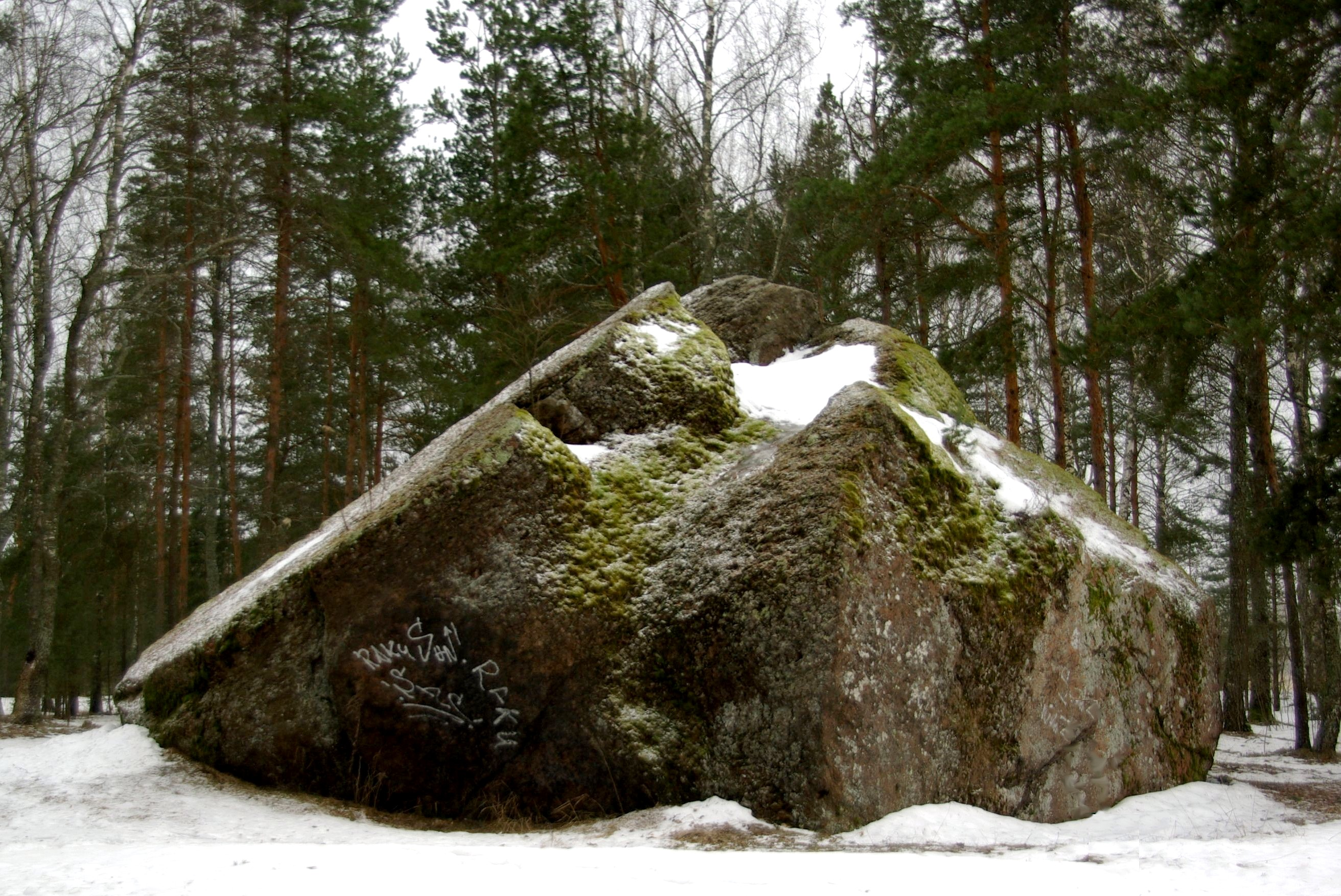
- Glacial erratic boulder at Lake Raku

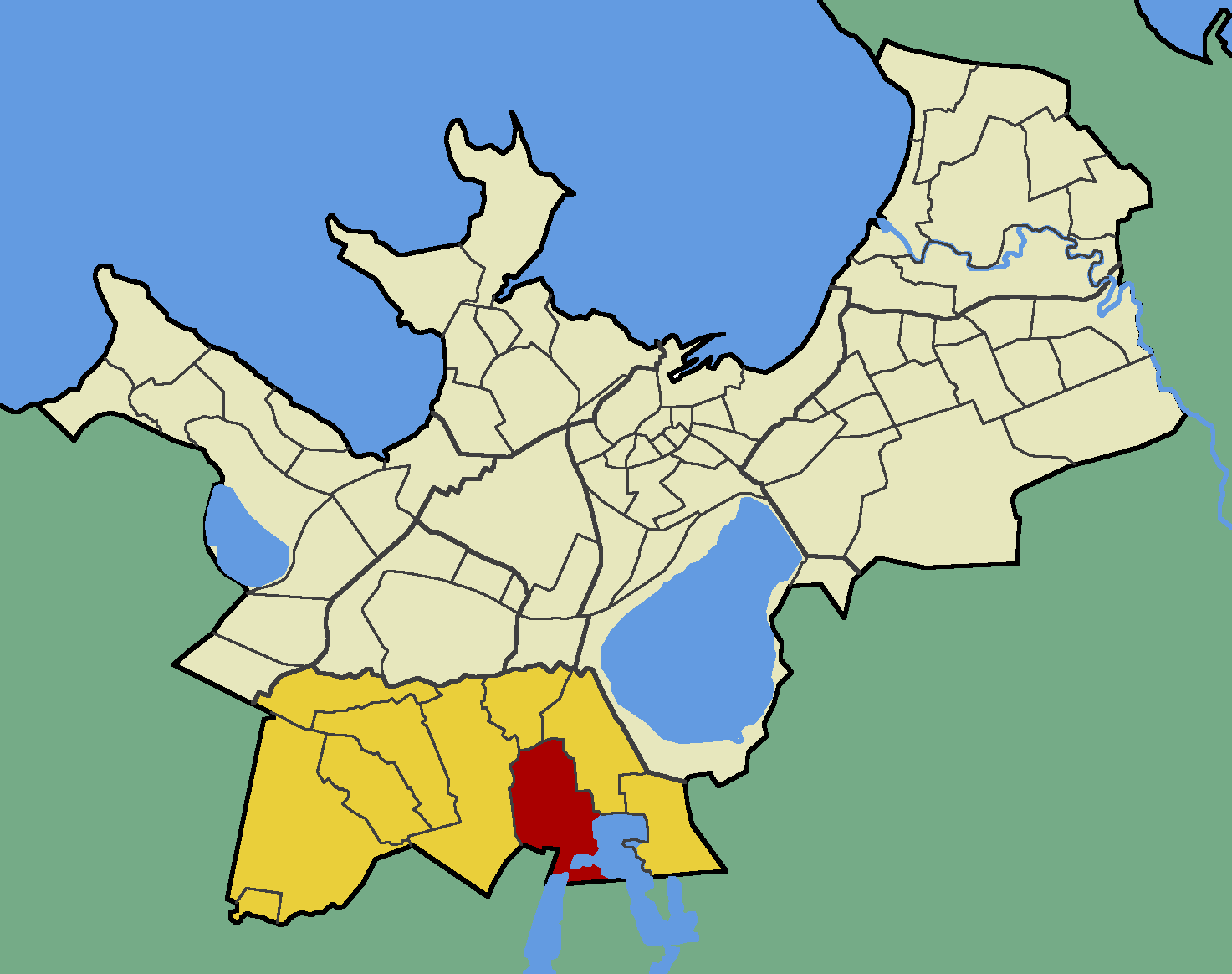
- Männiku within Nõmme District.
- Country: Estonia
- County: Harju County
- City: Tallinn
- District: Nõmme

Area
  - Total: 4.47 km^{2} (1.73 sq mi)

Population (01.01.2022)
  - Total: 5,556

Männiku (Estonian for "Pine Grove") is a subdistrict (Estonian: asum) in the district of Nõmme, Tallinn, the capital of Estonia. It covers an area of 4.47 km^{2} (1.73 sq mi) and has a population of 5,556 (As of 1 January 2022), of which 63 % are Estonian and 24 % are Russian. It has a population density of 1,501.6/km^{2} (3,889/sq mi).

== History ==
In the 1798 atlas of Livonia named "Atlas von Liefland", published by Ludwig August Mellin the territory of the subdistrict is named Suklemi or Suklema. By the beginning of the 20th century the still very sparsely populated area was known in Estonian as Valdek, from German Waldeck ("Forest corner"), after a pub with the same name located at the corner of Valdeku Street and what was named in 1927 Männiku Street.

A railway passing through, going from Tallinn to Viljandi, has been in use since 1900, although the Valdeku stop was only opened to civilian traffic in 1935. A railway station further south named Männiku (now part of the village of Männiku) to serve a planned garden city was opened in 1914, but the outbreak of the World War One led to the plan being abandoned, however, the railway stop remained nonetheless.

Instead, the area became increasingly notable for military infrastructure, such as the main military warehouses of Peter the Great's Naval Fortress, also known as Männiku hiigelload ("Giant Warehouses of Männiku"). Various military installations were in use in the area during Estonia's first period of modern independence, such as barracks, a military research station and a large military training area. Accidents with explosive material on 15 June 1936 led to a series of explosions that led to the deaths of 61 people, rescue works claimed 4 more lives.

Calcium silicate bricks, made from lime and sand, were produced since 1937 in a factory. Despite a similar factory existing nearby, demand was high as such bricks were widely used in Estonia for building residential and other buildings. In 1957, another factory for building materials was constructed. Gypsum and stone mining took place. All industrial activity, except for the Valdeku stone mining, ceased upon the end of Soviet occupation and reestablishment of independence in the 90s.

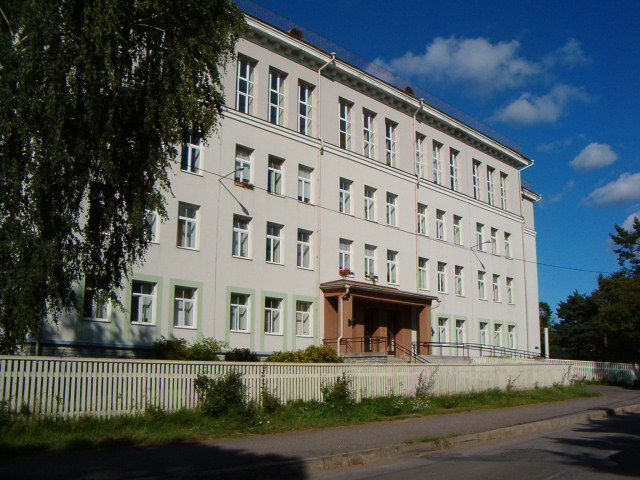
Nõmme social house, former Tallinn 39. High School, now housing the branch library, a care home and other facilities.

== Economy ==
Average monthly gross income per employee was 1,539 € in 2022, the lowest in Nõmme and one of the lowest of any subdistrict in Tallinn, only ahead of Väike-Õismäe, Mustamäe, Iru and most subdistricts of Põhja-Tallinn (except for Kalamaja) and most subdistricts of Lasnamäe, excluding Paevälja, Kurepõllu and Uuslinn.

== Culture ==
Männiku is home to a branch library and a youth center.

== Transport ==
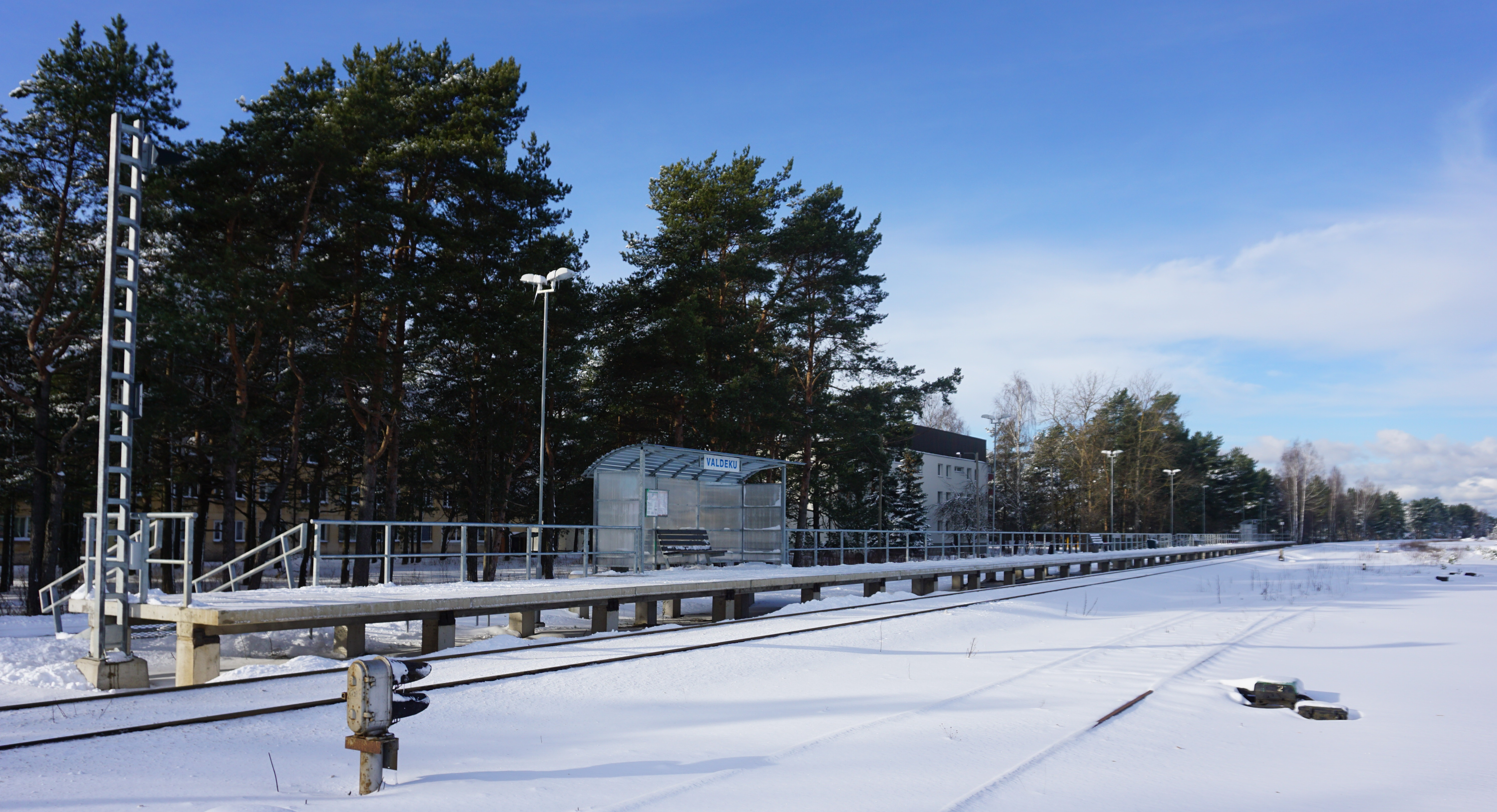
Railway stop Valdeku, opened in 2017

Männiku has a railway stop, named Valdeku (opened in 2017), part of the Tallinn-Viljandi railway. The railway stop Männiku, opened in 1916, is located outside Tallinn in the village of Männiku in Saku Parish.

It is also the endpoint of three bus lines in Tallinn (5, 32 and 33), with city bus line 57 as well as the Tallinn-Saku regional bus line passing through the subdistrict.

== Nature ==
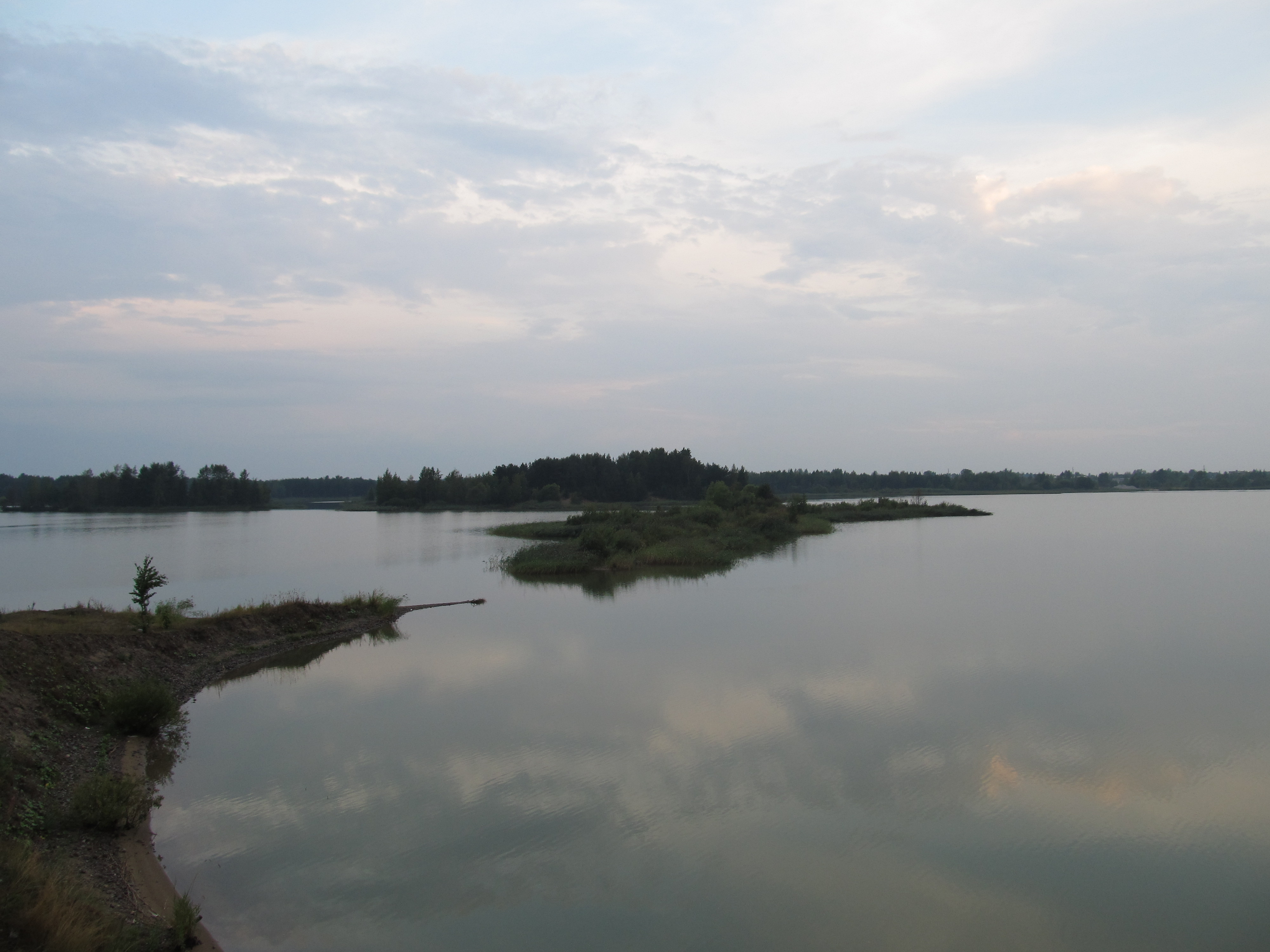
Lake Raku, a quarry lake

Most notable are four quarry lakes that partially or wholly are located in Männiku, Lake Raku, Lake Pumbajärv, Lake Männiku and Lake Väikejärv ("Small Lake").

A major glacial erratic boulder is located near Lake Raku, with a length of almost 12 m and under conservation since 1959.

Parts of the Männiku and Pääsküla raised bogs are also in the subdistrict.

== Gallery ==
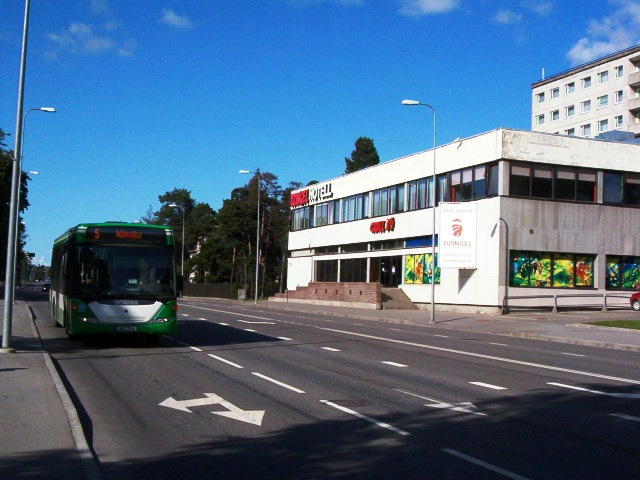
Hotel Džingel at the central Männiku Street

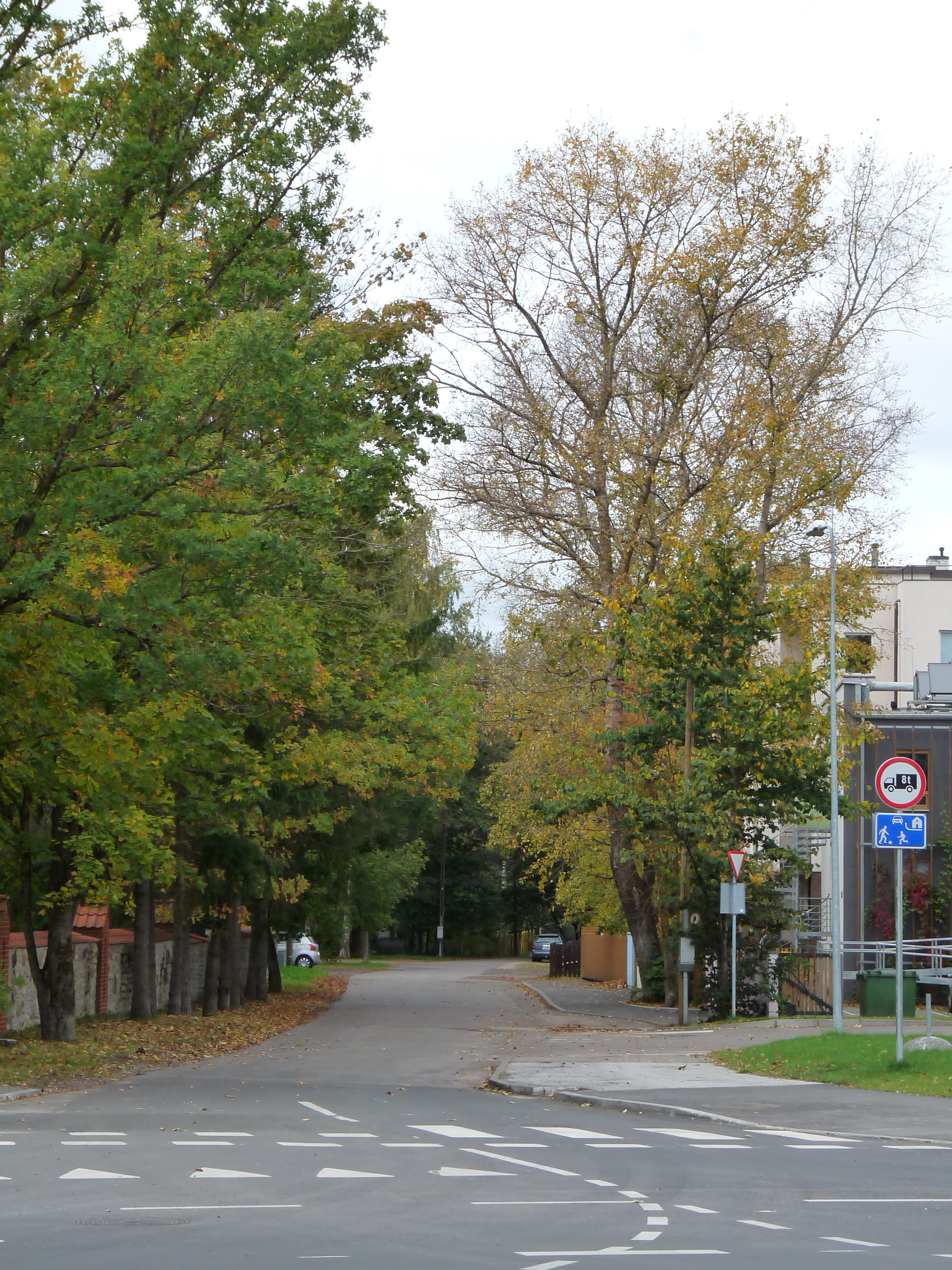
Kauge street

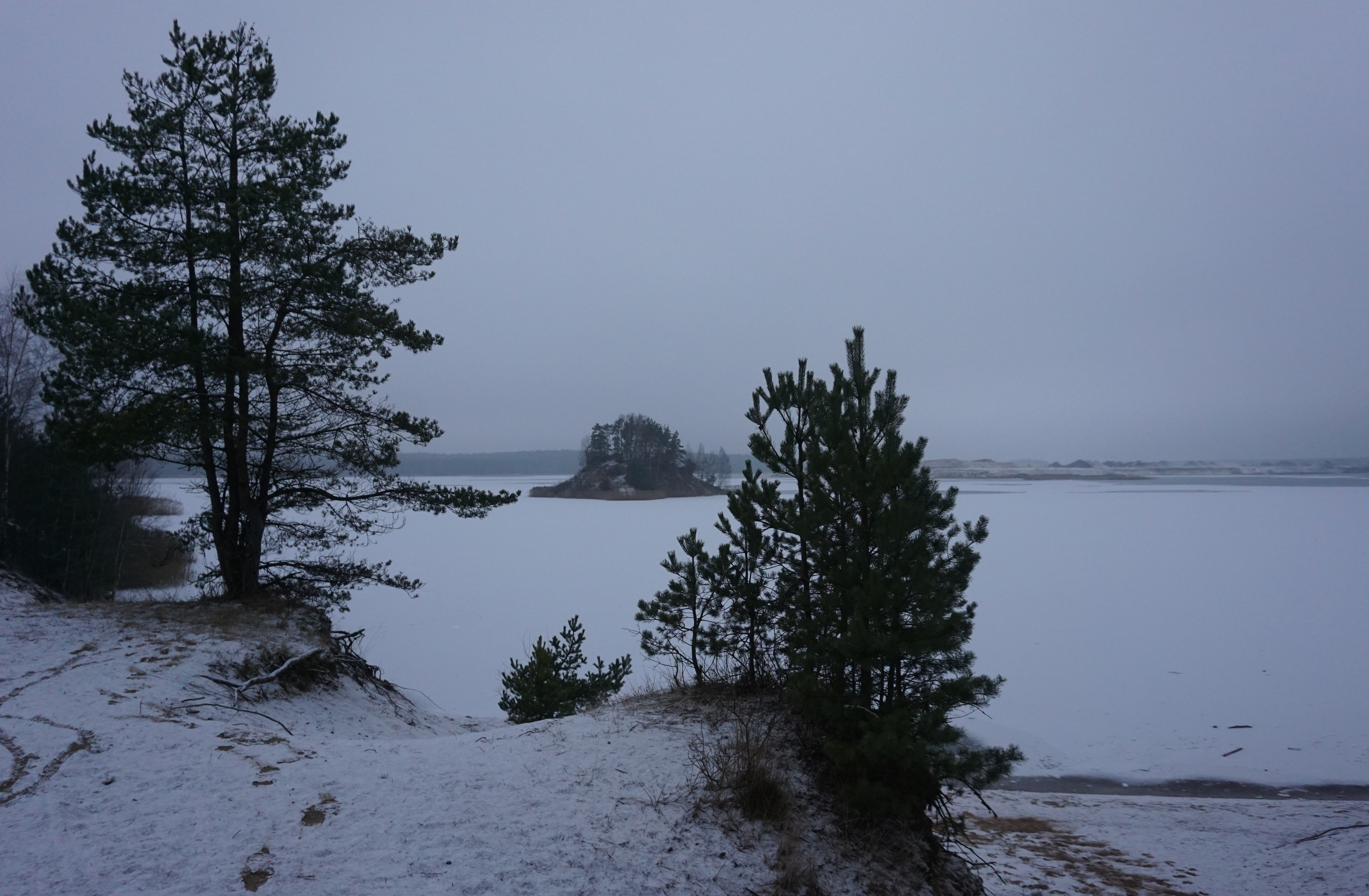
Männiku Quarry in winter

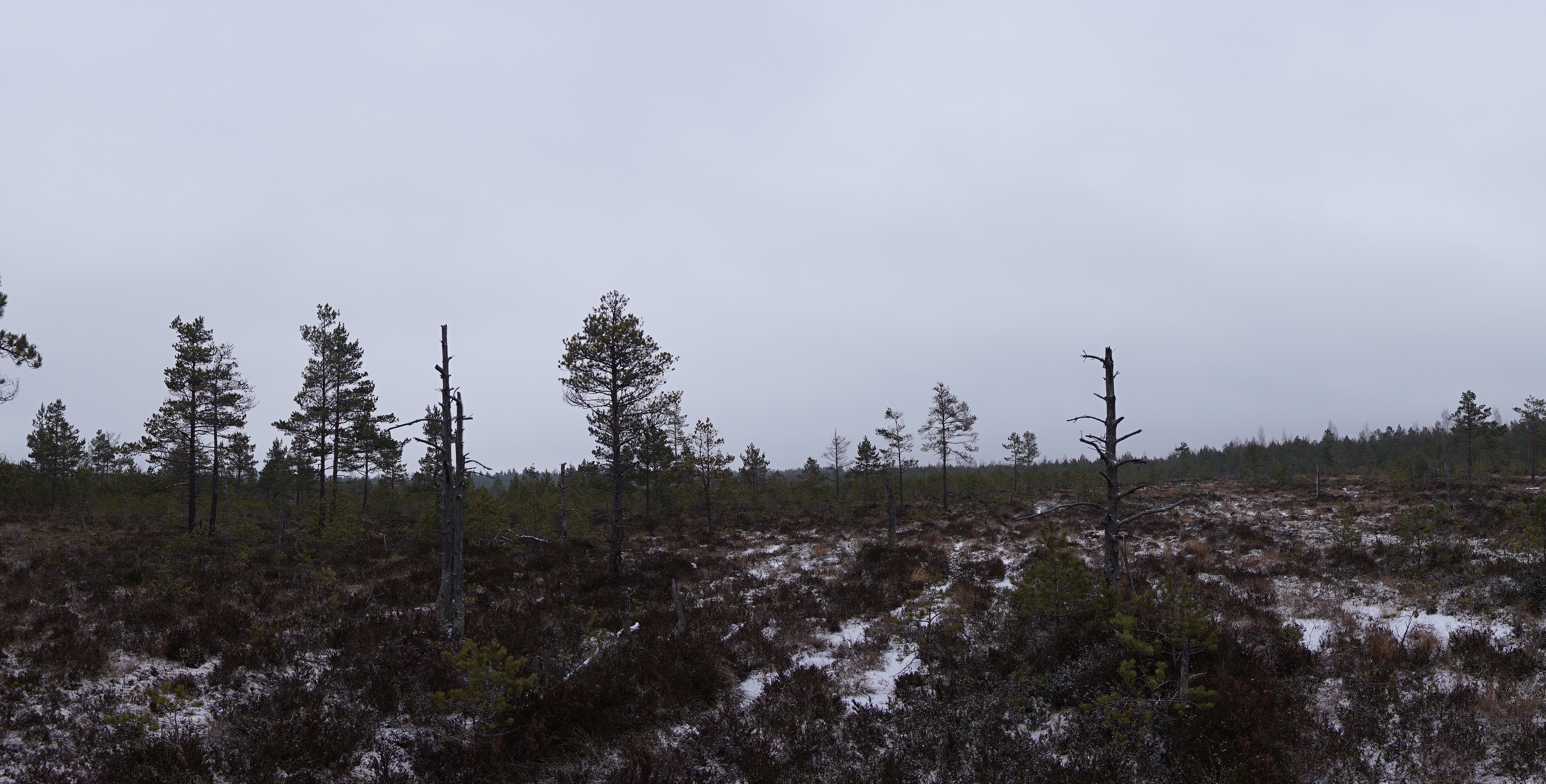
Winter in the raised bog of Männiku

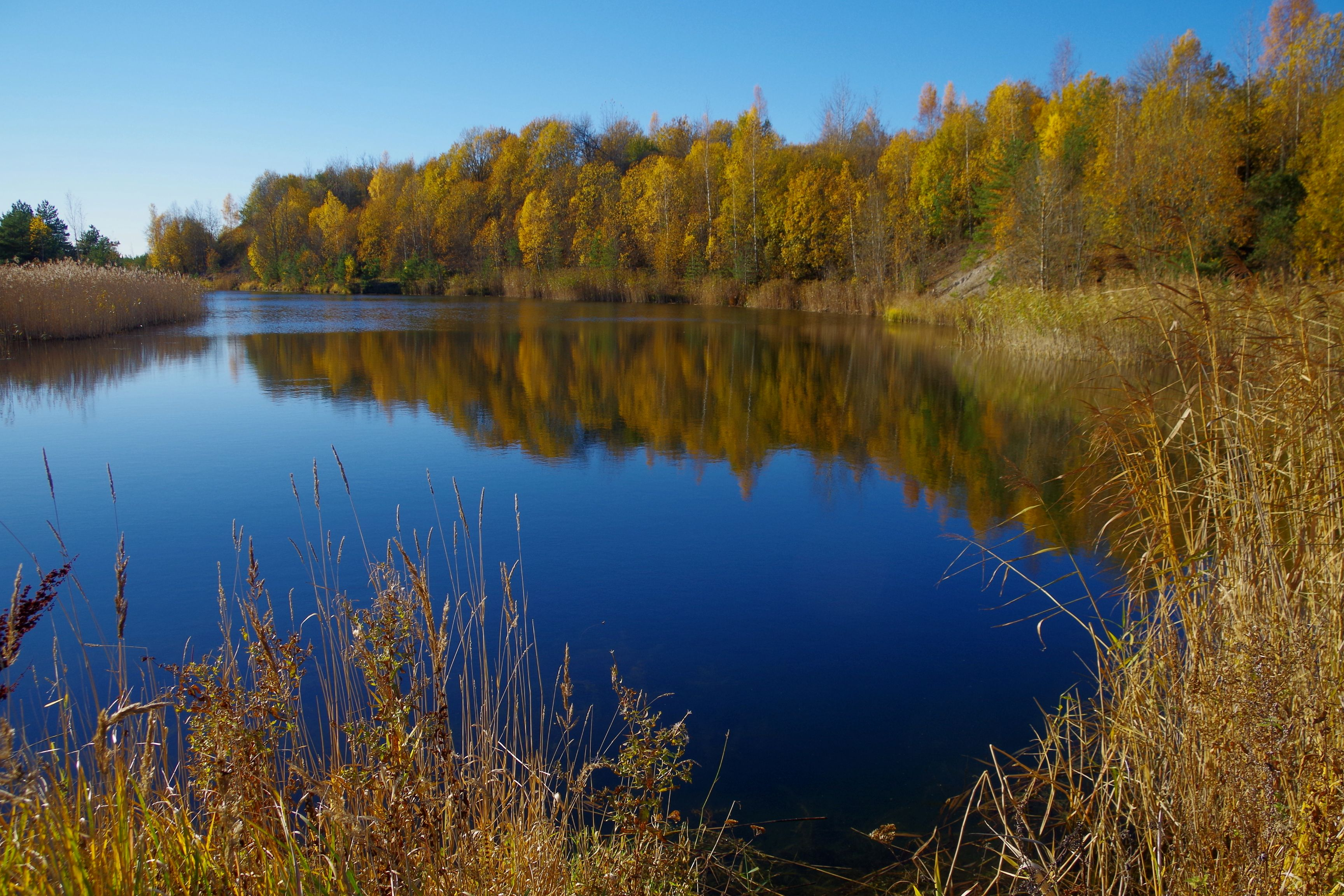
Lake Pumpajärv, a quarry lake in autumn

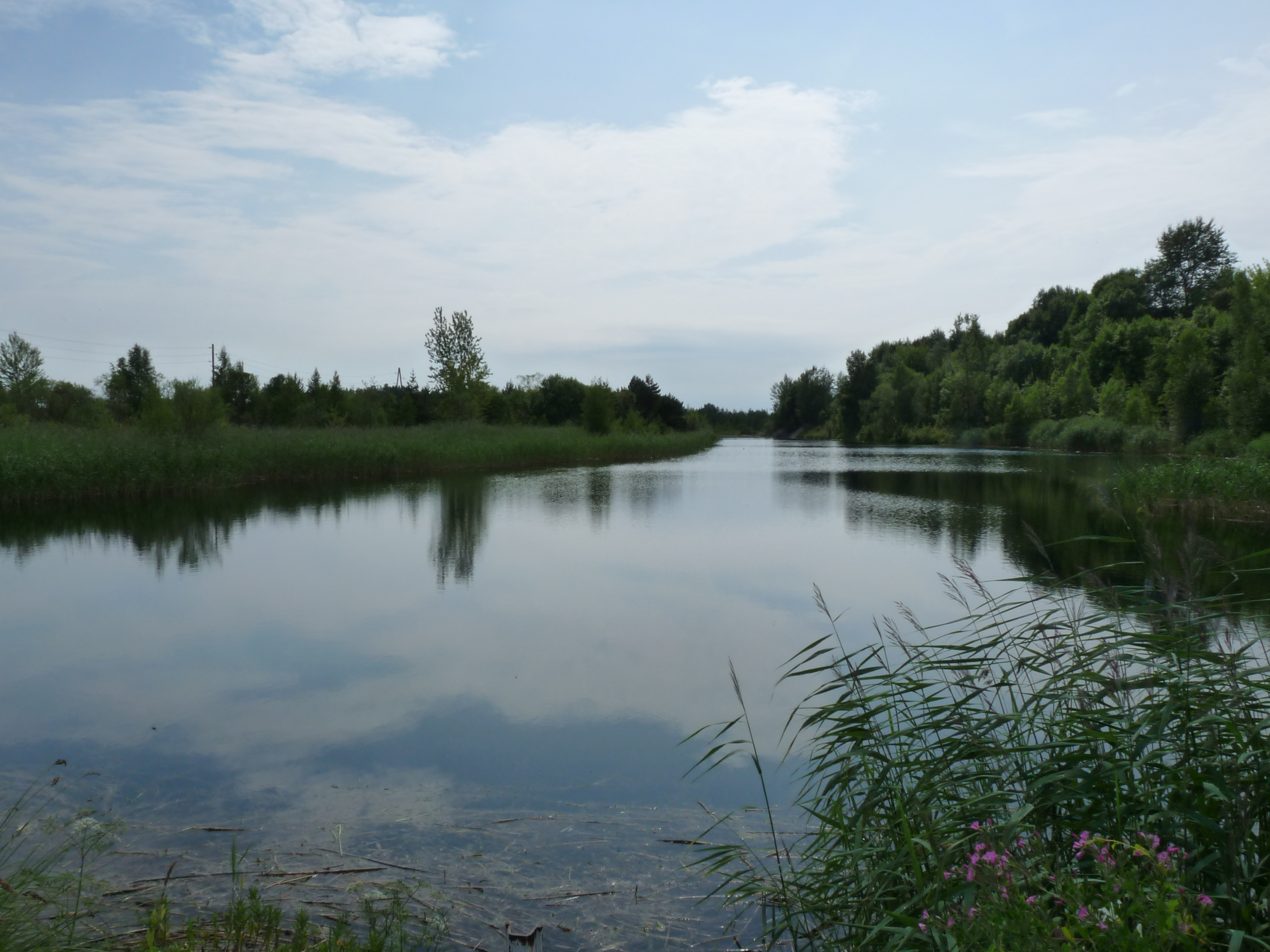
Lake Pumpajärv in summer

== See also ==
- Männiku training area
