= Rahumäe =

Subdistrict of Tallinn, Estonia

Coordinates: 59.388692°N 24.702952°E

- Subdistrict of Tallinn
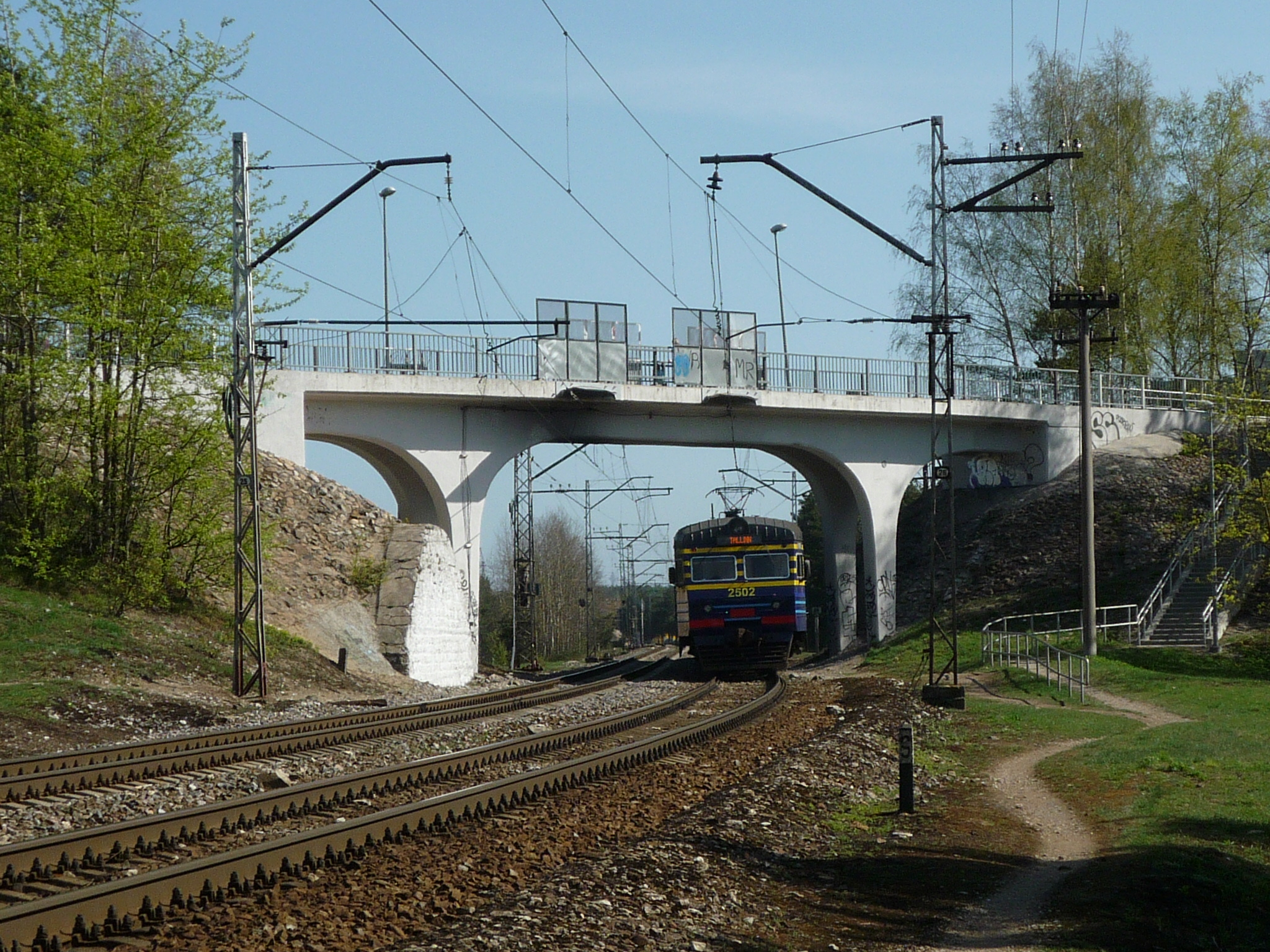
- Former narrow gauge railway viaduct, now used by pedestrians

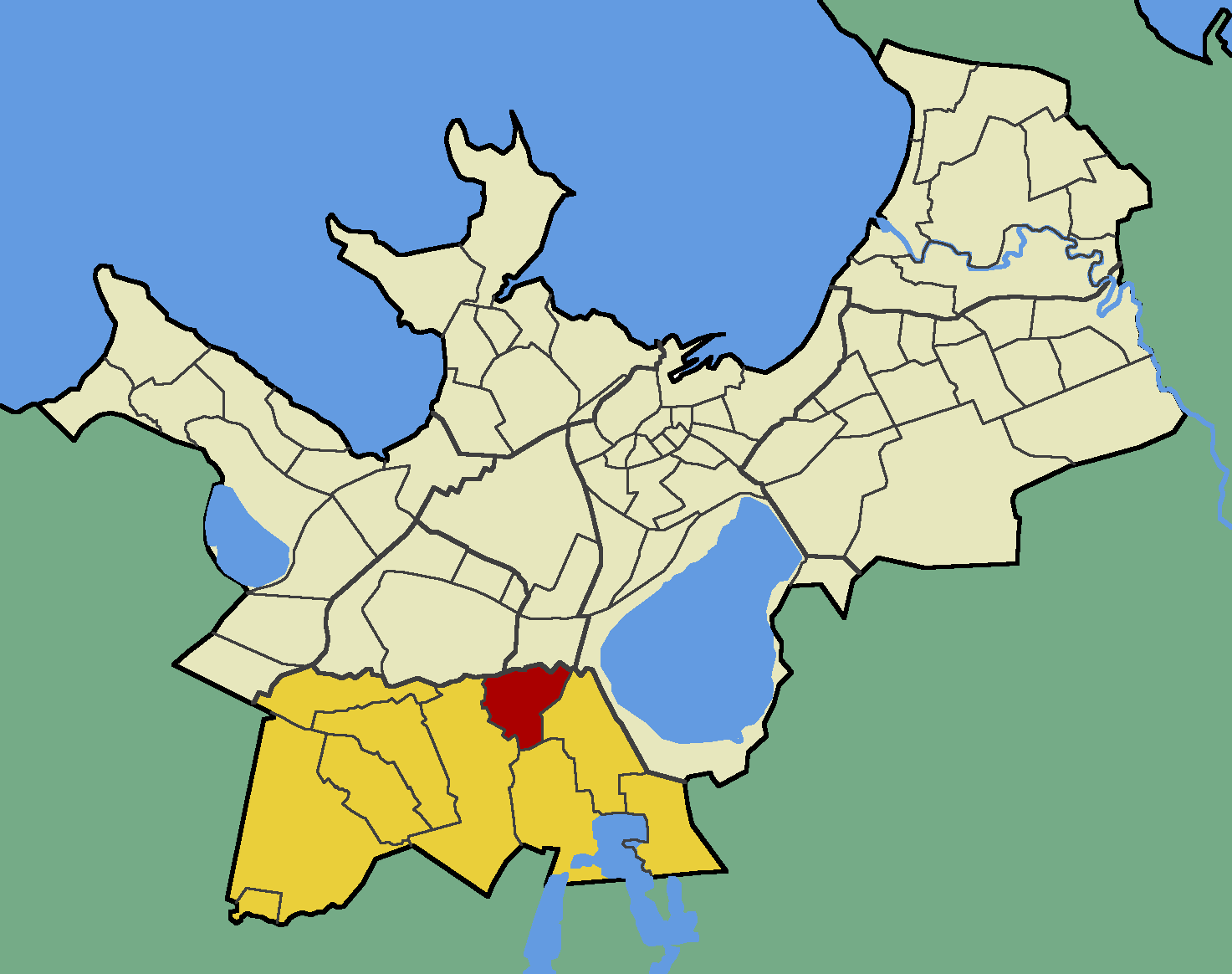
- Rahumäe within Nõmme District
- Country: Estonia
- County: Harju County
- City: Tallinn
- District: Nõmme

Area
  - Total: 1.75 km^{2} (0.68 sq mi)

Population (01.01.2014)
  - Total: 3,075
  - Density: 1,760/km^{2} (4,550/sq mi)

Rahumäe (Estonian for 'peace hill' or 'quiet hill') is a subdistrict (Estonian: asum) in the district of Nõmme, Tallinn, the capital of Estonia. It covers an area of 1.75 km^{2} (0.68 sq mi) and has a population of 3,075 (as of 1 January 2014), and a population density of 1,695/km^{2} (4,391/sq mi).

Rahumäe has a railway station on the Elron western route.

Rahumäe Cemetery and Tallinn's Jewish cemetery are in Rahumäe.

== Gallery ==
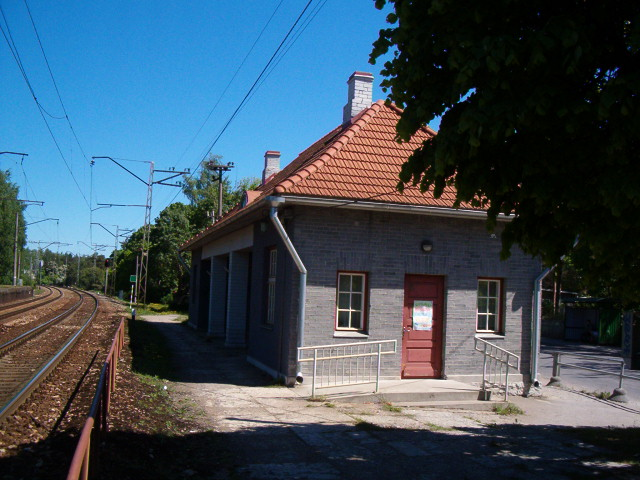
Rahumäe train station

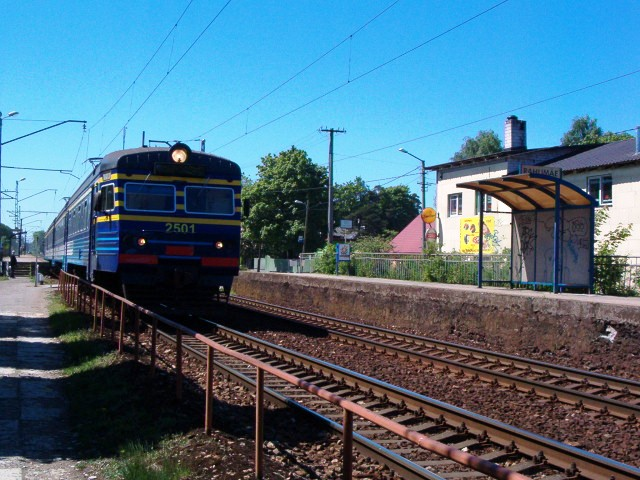
Rahumäe railway station

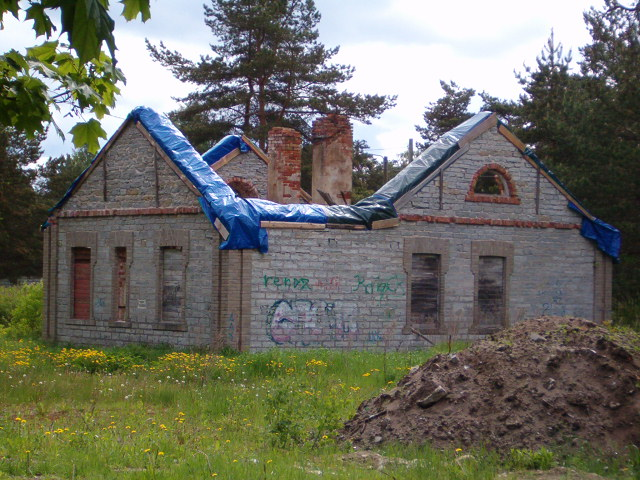
Ruins of the former narrow gauge railway station building

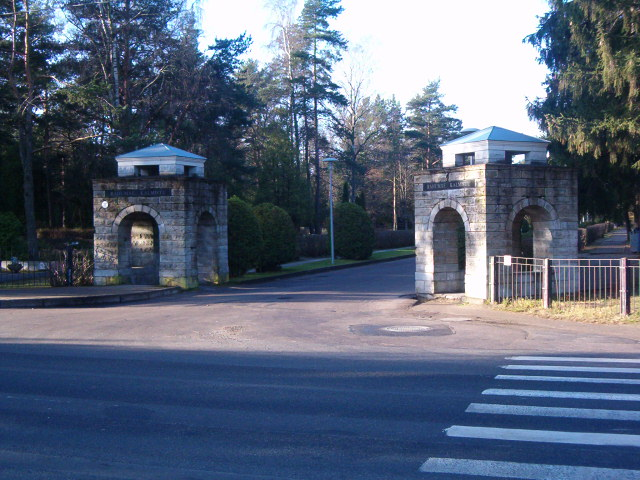
Entrance of Rahumäe Cemetery

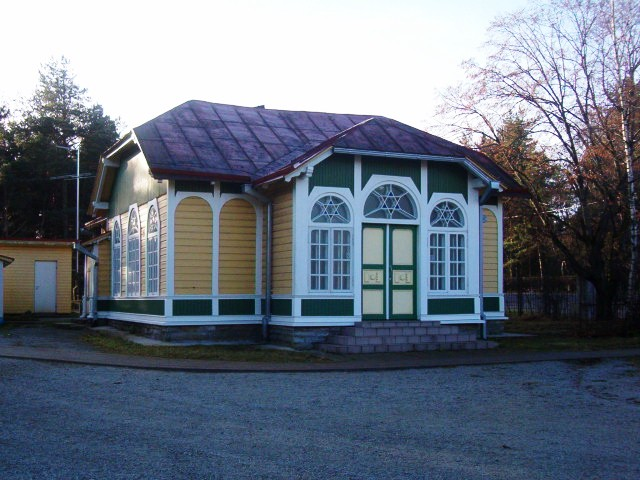
Chapel at the Jewish cemetery

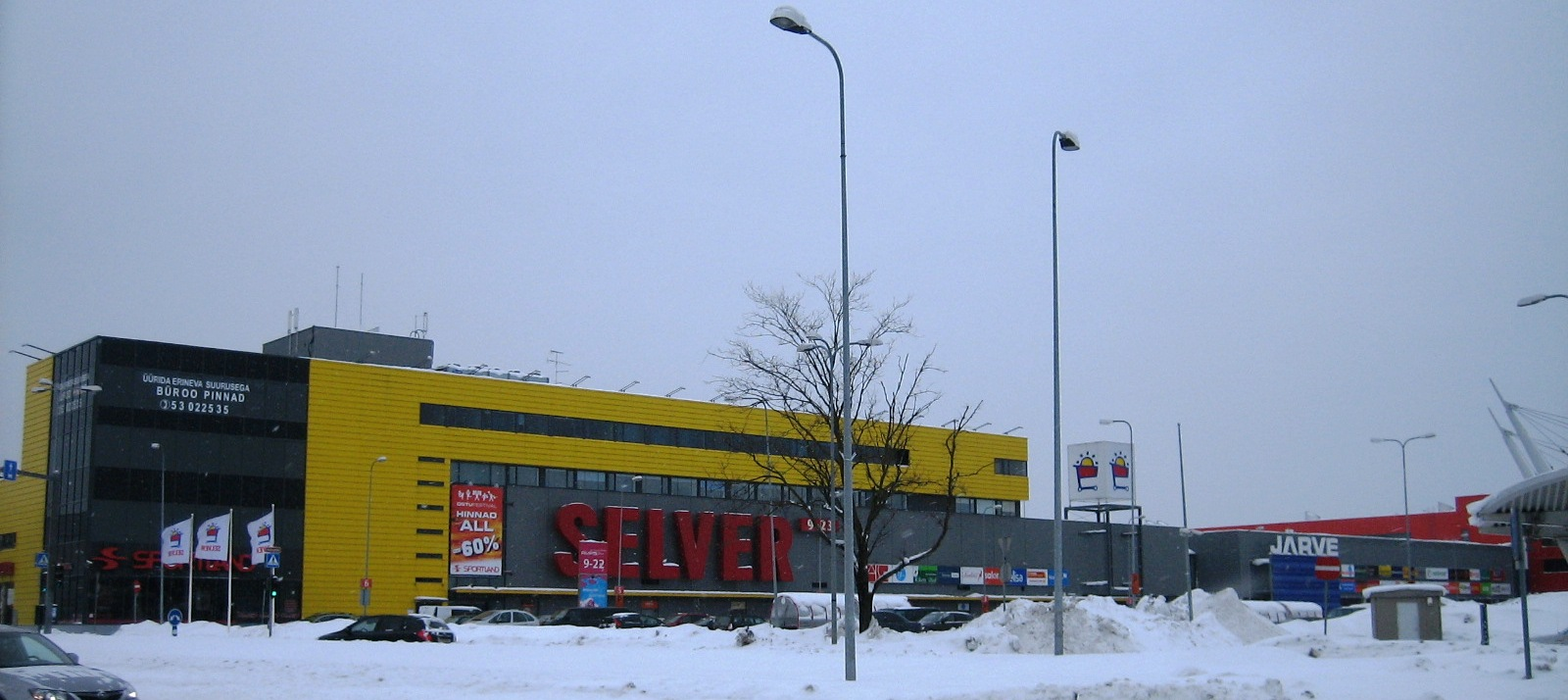
Järve shopping centre

Preceding station	Elron	Following station
Järve towards Tallinn	Tallinn–Turba/Paldiski	Nõmme towards Turba, Kloogaranna or Paldiski
