= List of railway stations in Estonia =

This is the list of railway stations located in Estonia. The list is incomplete.

Name	Location (settlement, municipality, county)	Year of opening	Further info	Image
Aardla	Tartu, Tartu municipality, Tartu County			
Aegviidu	Aegviidu, Anija Parish, Harju County	1870		
Aruküla	Aruküla, Raasiku Parish, Harju County	1920		
Elva	Elva, Elva Parish, Tartu County	1889		
Haapsalu	Haapsalu, Haapsalu municipality, Lääne County	1904	Closed 1997	
Hagudi	Hagudi, Rapla Parish, Rapla County	1900		
Hiiu	Tallinn, Harju County	1926		
Holvandi	Holvandi, Põlva Parish, Põlva County	1931		
Ilumetsa	Kikka, Räpina Parish, Põlva County	1931		
Jaanika	Jaanika, Saue Parish, Harju County			
Jäneda	Jäneda, Tapa Parish, Lääne-Viru County	1870		
Järve	Tallinn, Harju County	1923		
Jõgeva	Jõgeva, Jõgeva Parish, Jõgeva County	1878		
Jõhvi	Jõhvi, Jõhvi Parish, Ida-Viru County	1929		
Kaarepere	Kaarepere, Jõgeva Parish, Jõgeva County	1927		
Kabala	Viru-Kabala, Vinni Parish, Lääne-Viru County	1870		
Kadrina	Kadrina, Kadrina Parish, Lääne-Viru County	1870		
Kärevere	Kärevere, Türi Parish, Järva County	1900		
Kärkna	Kärkna, Tartu Parish, Tartu County			
Käru	Käru, Türi Parish, Järva County	1900		
Kasemetsa	Kasemetsa, Saku Parish, Harju County			
Keava	Keava, Kehtna Parish, Rapla County	1901		
Keeni	Keeni, Otepää Parish, Valga County	1894		
Kehra	Kehra, Anija Parish, Harju County	1876		
Keila	Keila, Harju County	1870		
Kibuna	Kibuna, Saue Parish, Harju County			
Kiidjärve	Kiidjärve, Põlva Parish, Põlva County	1931		
Kiisa	Kiisa, Saku Parish, Harju County	1928		
Kiltsi	Kiltsi, Väike-Maarja Parish, Lääne-Viru County	1876		
Kirsi	Tartu, Tartu municipality, Tartu County			
Kitseküla	Tallinn, Harju County	2008		
Kivimäe	Tallinn, Harju County	1924		
Kiviõli	Kiviõli, Lüganuse Parish, Ida-Viru County	1920s		
Klooga	Klooga, Lääne-Harju Parish, Harju County	1870		
Klooga-Aedlinn	Klooga, Lääne-Harju Parish, Harju County			
Kloogaranna	Kloogaranna, Lääne-Harju Parish, Harju County	1960		
Kohila	Kohila, Kohila Parish, Rapla County	1900		
Kohtla	Kohtla-Nõmme, Toila Parish, Ida-Viru County	1876	closed in 2014	
Kohtla-Nõmme	Kohtla-Nõmme, Toila Parish, Ida-Viru County	2014		
Koidula	Koidula, Setomaa Parish, Võru County	2011		
Kulli	Kulli, Raasiku Parish, Harju County			
Kulna	Kulna, Lääne-Harju Parish, Harju County	1928		
Laagri	Tallinn, Harju County	1932	Unofficially opened in 1928	
Lagedi	Lagedi, Rae Parish, Harju County	1872		
Lahinguvälja	Vikipalu, Anija Parish, Harju County	1939	1957–2009 known as Vikipalu	
Laitse	Kaasiku, Saue Parish, Harju County			
Laoküla	Laoküla, Lääne-Harju Parish, Harju County			
Lehtse	Lehtse, Tapa Parish, Lääne-Viru County	1876		
Lelle	Lelle, Kehtna Parish, Rapla County	1900		
Liiva	Tallinn, Harju County			
Lilleküla	Tallinn, Harju County	1928		
Lohu	Mälivere, Kohila Parish, Rapla County			
Mägiste	Ädu, Otepää Parish, Valga County	1919		
Männiku	Männiku, Saku Parish, Harju County	1916		
Metsa	Piirsalu, Lääne-Nigula Parish, Lääne County		closed	
Mustjõe	Mustjõe, Anija Parish, Harju County	1927		
Narva	Narva, Ida-Viru County	1870		
Nelijärve	Aegviidu, Anija Parish, Harju County	1938		
Niitvälja	Niitvälja, Lääne-Harju Parish, Harju County			
Nõmme	Tallinn, Harju County	1872		
Nõo	Nõo Nõo Parish, Tartu County	1898		
Ollepa	Ollepa, Türi Parish, Järva County	1900		
Olustvere	Olustvere, Põhja-Sakala Parish, Viljandi County	1900		
Orava	Rõssa, Võru Parish, Võru County	1931		
Oru	Kohtla-Järve, Ida-Viru County	1870s		
Pääsküla	Tallinn, Harju County	1915		
Padula	Laagri, Saue Parish, Harju County	2008		
Paldiski	Paldiski, Lääne-Harju Parish, Harju County	1870		
Palupera	Palupera, Elva Parish, Tartu County			
Parila	Parila, Anija Parish, Harju County			
Pärnu	Pärnu, Pärnu municipality, Pärnu County		closed	
Pechory	Pechory		now in the territory of Russia, formerly in Estonia	
Pedja	Pedja, Jõgeva Parish, Jõgeva County			
Peedu	Elva Elva Parish, Tartu County	1887		
Piusa	Piusa, Võru Parish, Võru County	1930		
Põllküla	Põllküla, Lääne-Harju Parish, Harju County			
Põlva	Põlva, Põlva Parish, Põlva County	1931		
Puka	Puka, Otepää Parish, Valga County	1889		
Püssi	Püssi, Lüganuse Parish, Ida-Viru County	1870		
Raasiku	Raasiku, Raasiku Parish, Harju County	1870		
Rahumäe	Tallinn, Harju County	1926		
Rakke	Rakke, Väike-Maarja Parish, Lääne-Viru County	1876		
Rakvere	Rakvere, Lääne-Viru County	1870		
Rapla	Rapla, Rapla Parish, Rapla County	1900		
Rebase	Rebase, Kambja Parish, Tartu County			
Reola	Tõõraste, Kastre Parish, Tartu County	1931		
Ridala	Kadaka, Haapsalu municipality, Lääne County		closed	
Riisipere	Riisipere, Saue Parish, Harju County	1905		
Risti	Risti, Lääne-Nigula Parish, Lääne County		closed	
Roobuka	Roobuka, Saku Parish, Harju County			
Ropka	Külitse, Kambja Parish, Tartu County	1923		
Ruusa	Ruusa, Räpina Parish, Põlva County	1931		
Saku	Saku, Saku Parish, Harju County	1900		
Sangaste	Tsirguliina, Valga Parish, Valga County	1889		
Saue	Saue, Saue Parish, Harju County	1872		
Sonda	Sonda, Lüganuse Parish, Ida-Viru County	1890		
Sürgavere	Sürgavere, Põhja-Sakala Parish, Viljandi County	1900		
Tabivere	Tabivere, Tartu Parish, Tartu County	1877		
Taevaskoja	Taevaskoja, Põlva Parish, Põlva County	1931		
Taikse	Taikse, Türi Parish, Järva County	1900		
Tallinn Baltic Station	Tallinn, Harju County	1870		
Tallinn-Väike	Tallinn, Harju County			
Tamsalu	Tamsalu, Tapa Parish, Lääne-Viru County	1876		
Tapa	Tapa, Tapa Parish, Lääne-Viru County	1870		
Tartu	Tartu, Tartu municipality, Tartu County	1876		
Tondi	Tallinn, Harju County	1933		
Tõravere	Tõravere Nõo Parish, Tartu County			
Turba	Turba, Saue Parish, Harju County	1924	reopened in 2019	
Türi	Türi, Türi Parish, Järva County	1900		
Uhti	Uhti, Kambja Parish, Tartu County			
Ülemiste	Tallinn, Harju County	1900		
Ülenurme	Ülenurme, Kambja Parish, Tartu County	1931		
Urda	Laagri, Saue Parish, Harju County	2008		
Vägeva	Vägeva, Jõgeva Parish, Jõgeva County			
Vaharu	Jaakna, Lääne-Nigula Parish, Lääne County		closed; also known as Jaakna railway station	
Vaivara	Vaivara, Narva-Jõesuu municipality, Ida-Viru County	1870		
Valdeku	Tallinn, Harju County	2017		
Valga	Valga, Valga Parish, Valga County	1887		
Valgemetsa	Valgemetsa, Põlva Parish, Põlva County			
Valingu	Valingu, Saue Parish, Harju County			
Vana-Kuuste	Vana-Kuuste, Kambja Parish, Tartu County			
Variku	Soinaste, Kambja Parish, Tartu County		closed in 2008	
Vasalemma	Vasalemma, Lääne-Harju Parish, Harju County	1917		
Vastse-Kuuste	Vastse-Kuuste, Põlva Parish, Põlva County	1931		
Veriora	Veriora, Räpina Parish, Põlva County	1931		
Vesse	Tallinn, Harju County			
Vilivere	Vilivere, Kohila Parish, Rapla County			
Viljandi	Viljandi, Viljandi County	1897		
Võhma	Võhma, Põhja-Sakala Parish, Viljandi County	1900		
Võru	Võru, Võru County	1889	closed to passenger traffic in 2001	
