= Nõmme (subdistrict) =

Subdistrict of Tallinn, Estonia

Coordinates: 59.388031°N 24.684069°E

- Subdistrict of Tallinn
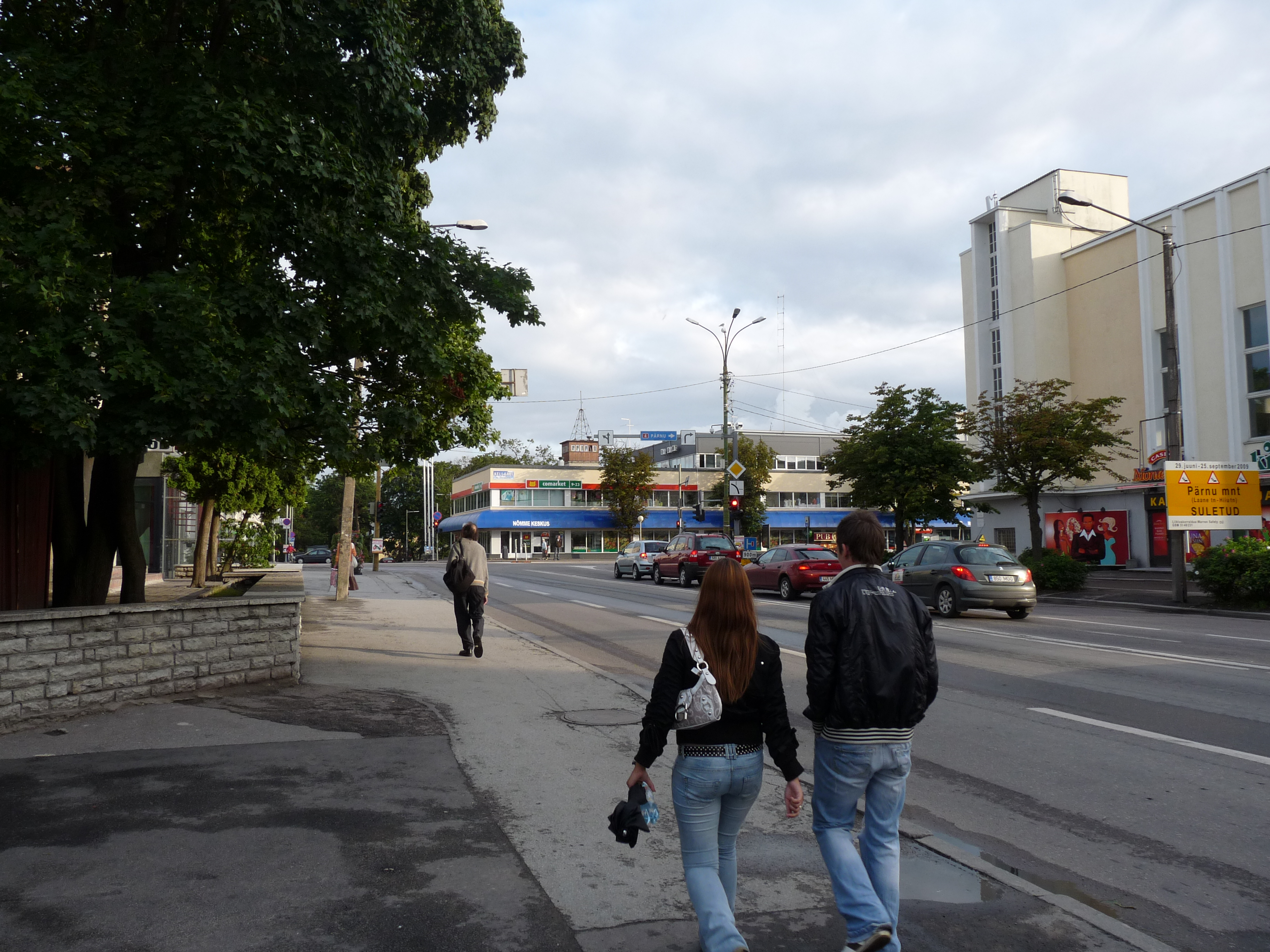

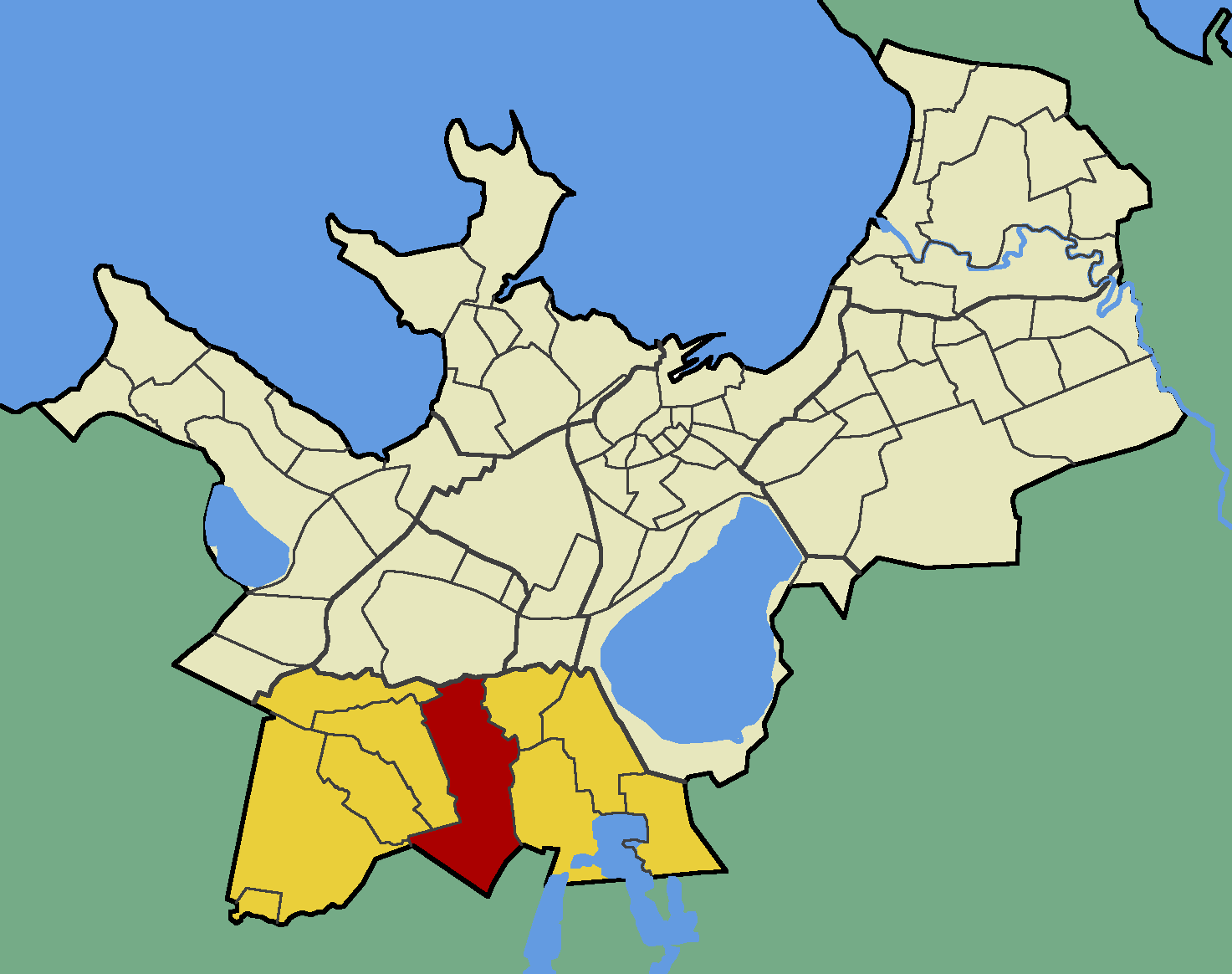
- Nõmme subdistrict within Nõmme District.
- Country: Estonia
- County: Harju County
- City: Tallinn
- District: Nõmme

Area
  - Total: 4.60 km^{2} (1.78 sq mi)

Population (01.01.2014)
  - Total: 6,389
  - Density: 1,390/km^{2} (3,600/sq mi)

Nõmme (Estonian for "Heath") is a subdistrict in the district of Nõmme, Tallinn, the capital of Estonia. It covers an area of 4.60 km^{2} (1.78 sq mi) and had a population on 1 January 2014 of 6,389, with a population density of 1,313.7/km^{2} (3,402/sq mi).

Nõmme has a station on the Elron western route. The first train station in Nõmme was opened in 1872.

== Gallery ==
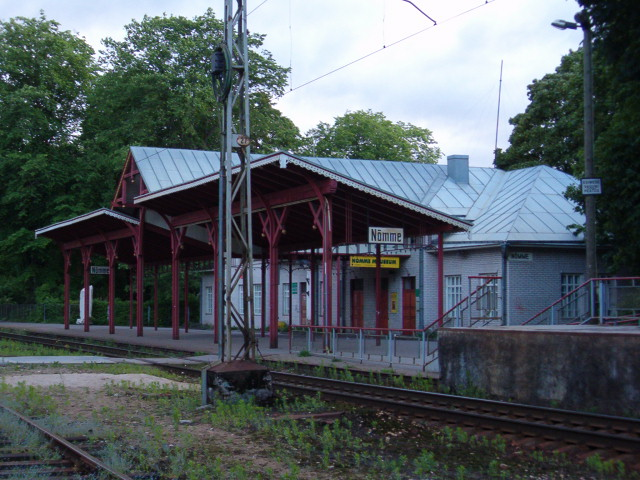
Nõmme railway station

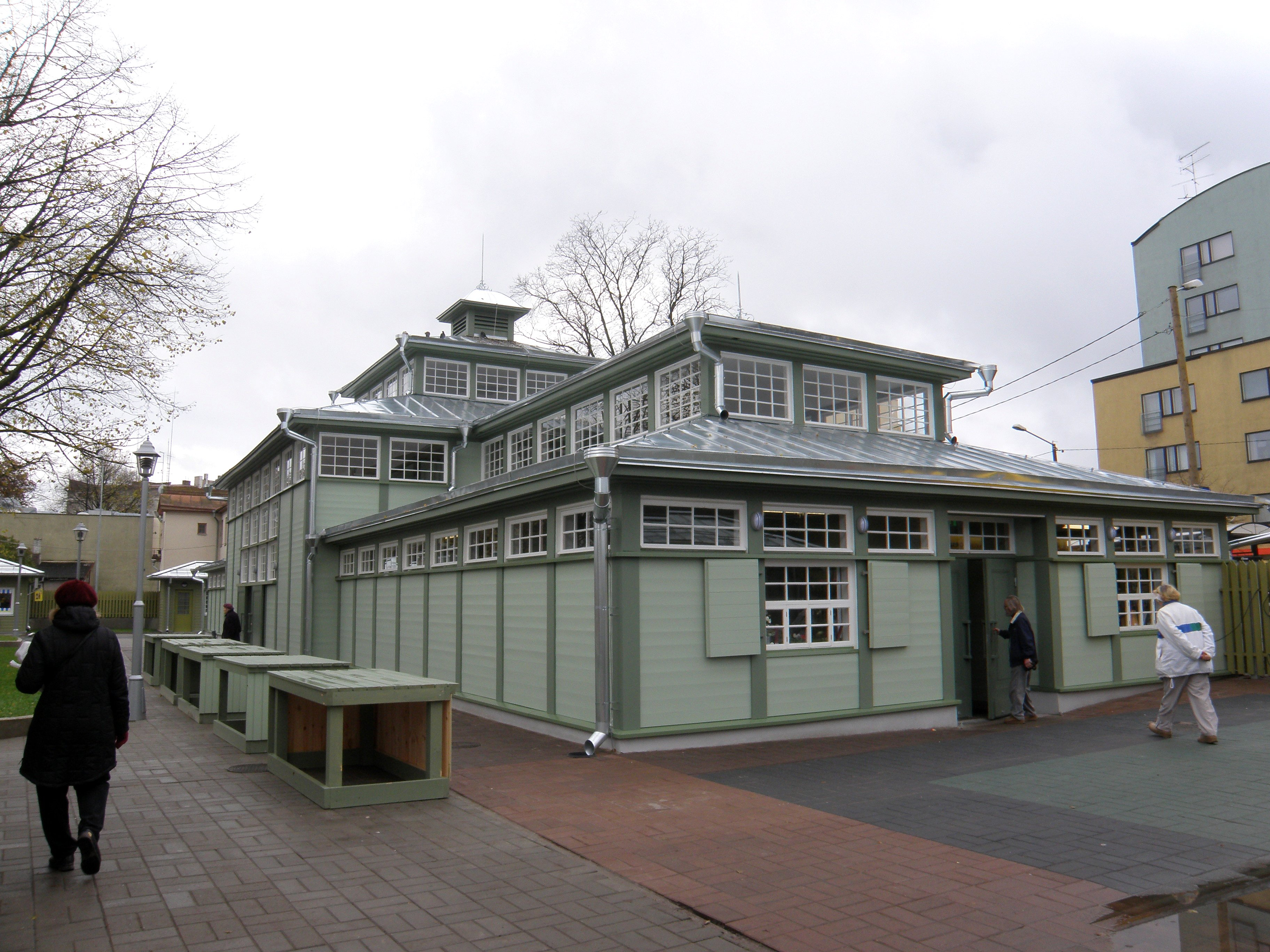
Nõmme market building, burned down and rebuilt in 2010

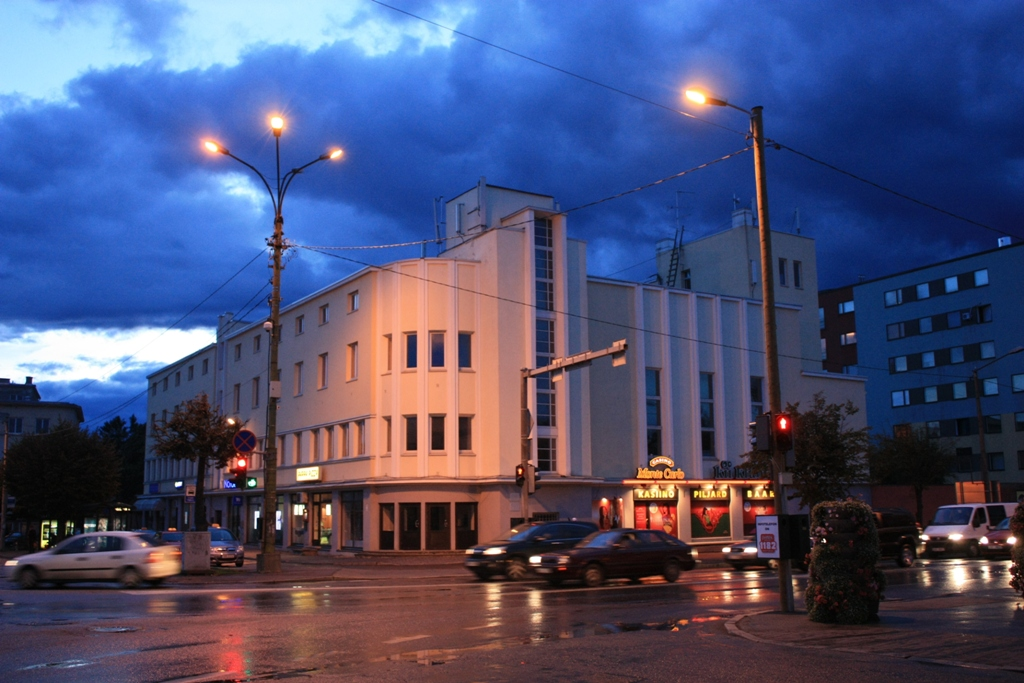

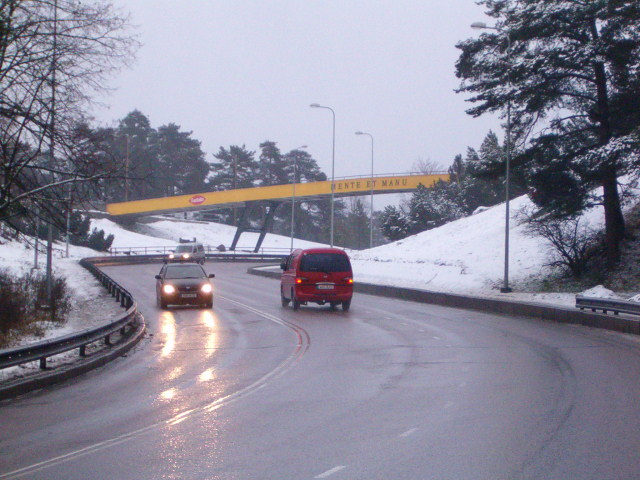
Ehitajate tee going up to Nõmme hill from Mustamäe.

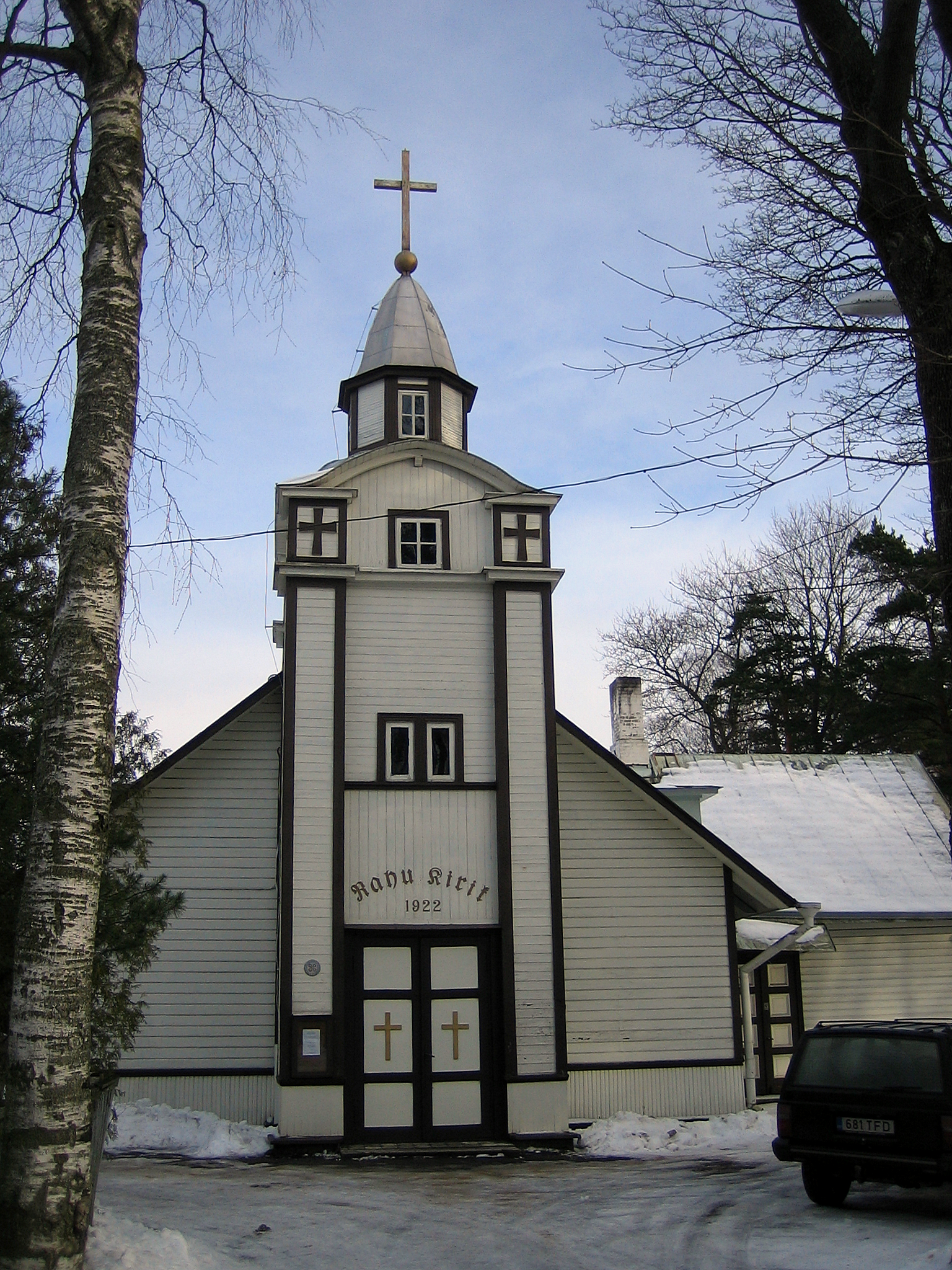
Nõmme Rahu (Peace) Church

Preceding station	Elron	Following station
Rahumäe towards Tallinn	Tallinn–Turba/Paldiski	Hiiu towards Turba, Kloogaranna or Paldiski
