= Tondi railway station =

Railway station in Tallinn, Estonia

Tondi
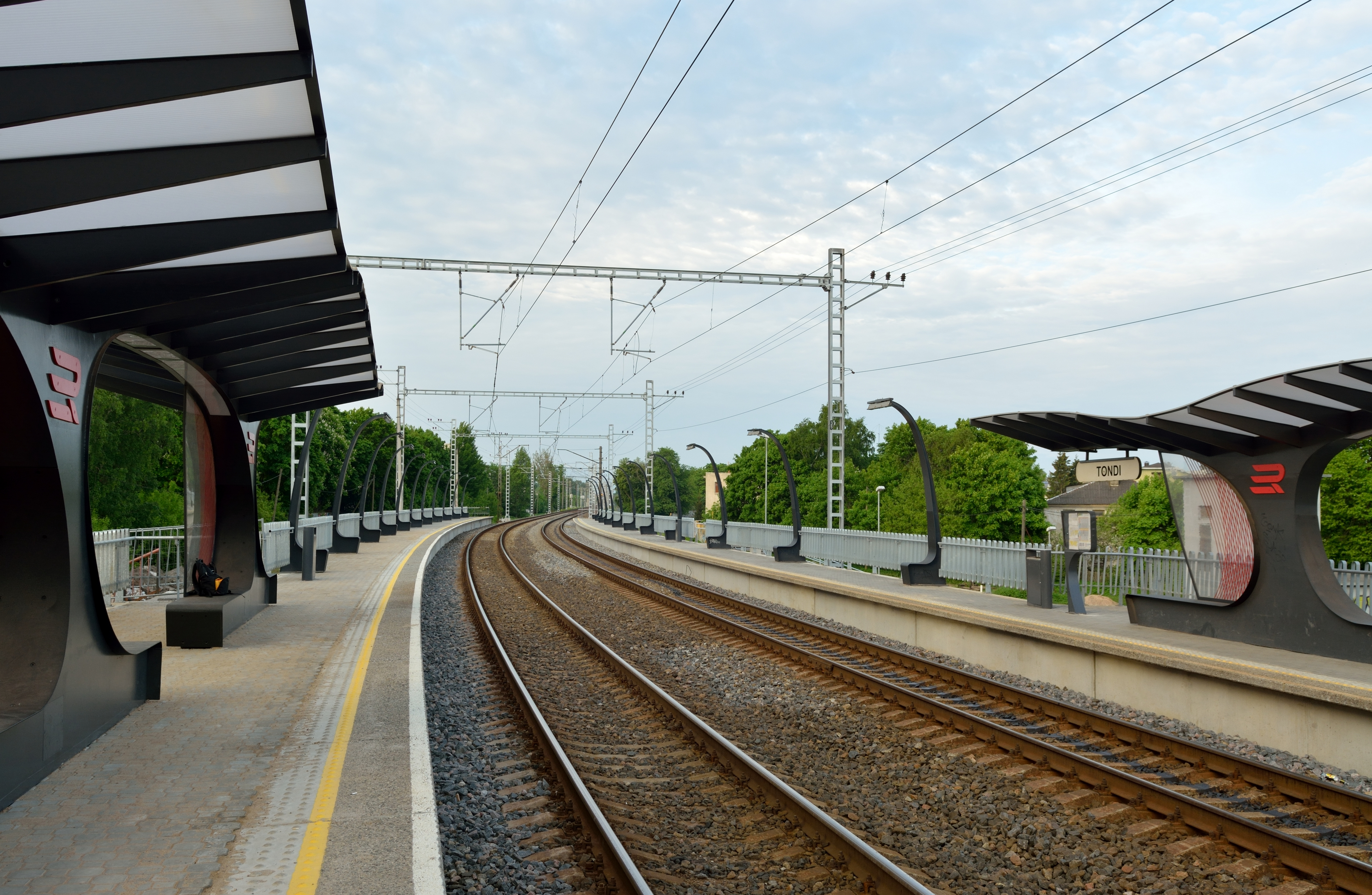
- Tondi station in 2013

General information
- Location: Tondi, Kristiine, Tallinn, Harju County; Estonia
- Coordinates: 59°24′38.31″N 24°44′0.16″E
- System: railway station
- Owner: Eesti Raudtee (EVR)
- Line: Elron commuter rail
- Platforms: 2
- Tracks: 2
- Train operators: Elron
- Connections: Buses 23 28; Trams 3 4

Construction
- Structure type: at-grade

Other information
- Fare zone: I

History
- Opened: 1933; 93 years ago
- Electrified: 1924; 3 kV DC OHLE

Services
Preceding station	Elron	Following station
Lilleküla towards Tallinn	Tallinn–Turba/Paldiski	Järve towards Turba, Kloogaranna or Paldiski
Preceding station	Trams in Tallinn	Following station
Kalev towards Kadriorg	3	Tallinn-Väike One-way operation
Kalev towards Suur-Paala	4	Tallinn-Väike One-way operation
Location

Tondi railway station (Estonian: Tondi raudteepeatus) is a railway station in Tallinn, the capital of Estonia. It is located on the border of Tondi and Kitseküla subdistricts.

It is the third station on Elron's western route, located between Lilleküla and Järve stations. It is situated beside the level crossing of Tondi street, and is one of two places in Tallinn where the commuter train and tram stations are conjoined (the other is the terminus Balti jaam). The station is served by all commuter trains heading to Keila, Paldiski, Riisipere and Kloogaranna. It consists of two 167 metre platforms.

Although the Tallinn–Paldiski railway existed already in 1870, a station on the site was opened in 1933. The line from Tallinn to back then a nearby town Nõmme (as far as Pääsküla) was electrified already in 1924. In 1933 the tram line was drawn out to the new station building and a depot was built.

The station building was closed to the public in 1998 and remained in very bad condition. In 2006 it was declared a cultural heritage monument. In 2012 the old platforms were replaced with new lower ones. The upper wooden part of the station building was also demolished after several fires. Since the building was a cultural heritage monument, the elements of the building were charted and the plans of restoring it in the genuine appearance still remain.

It is planned to convert the level crossing into a railway viaduct in the future to reduce the traffic congestion during the rush hours.

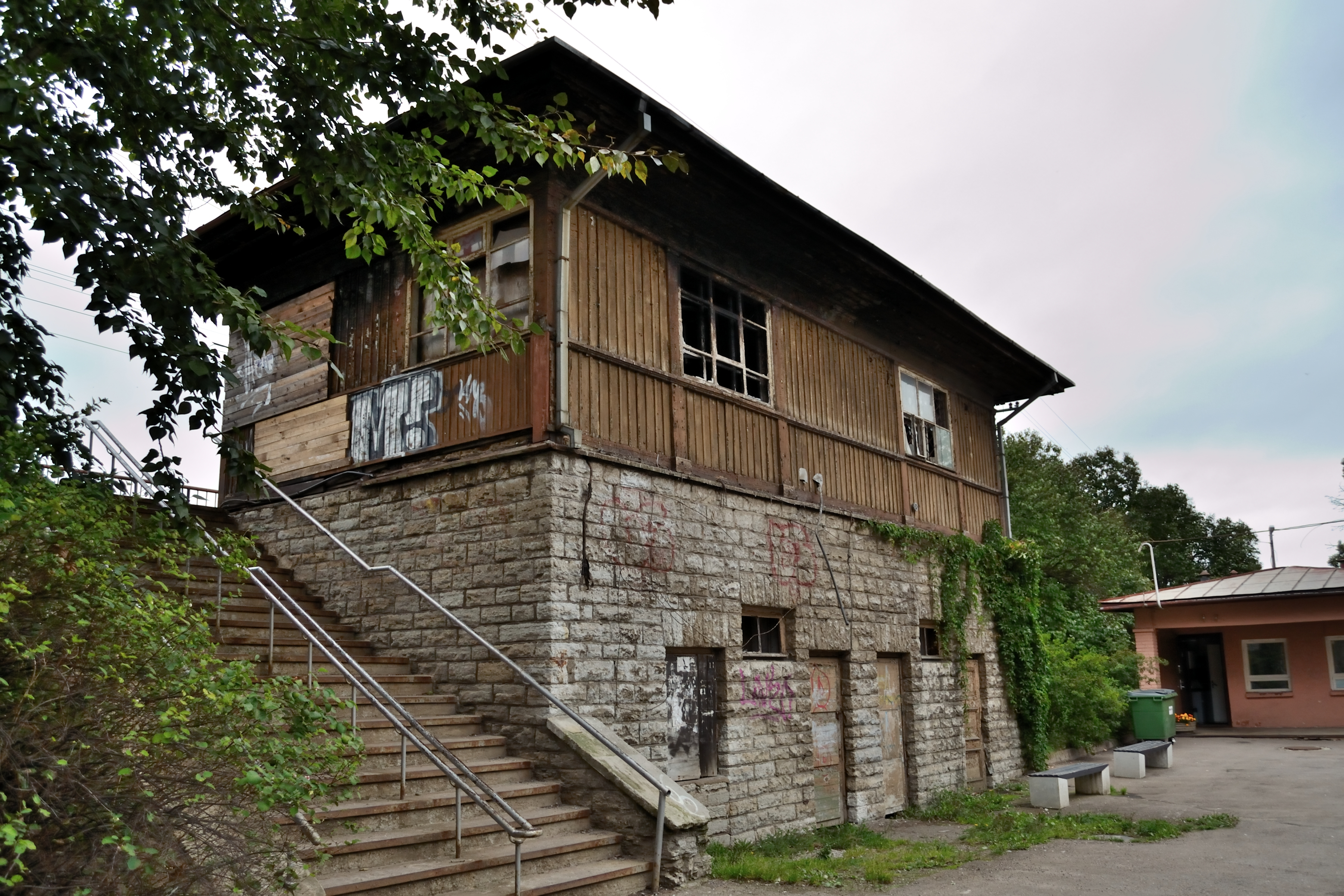
The station building in 2011.

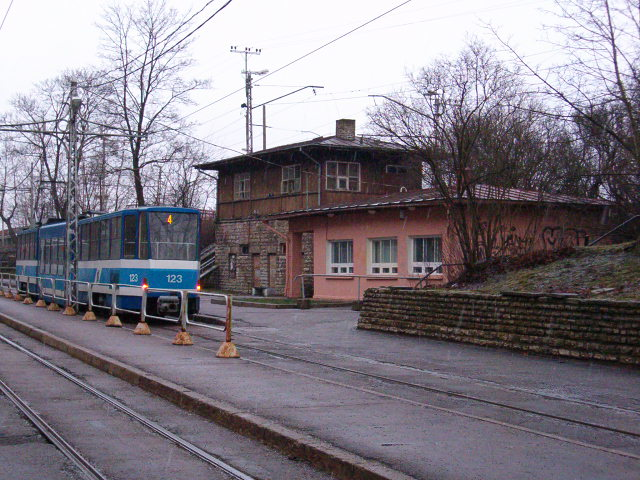
The station building and the tram depot in 2008.

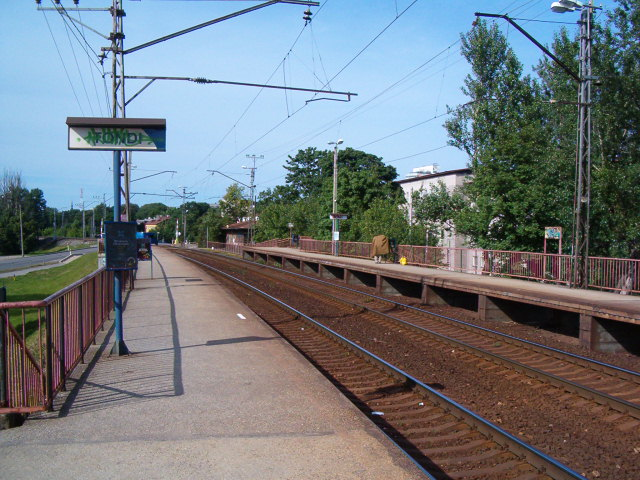
Tondi station with old platforms in 2009.

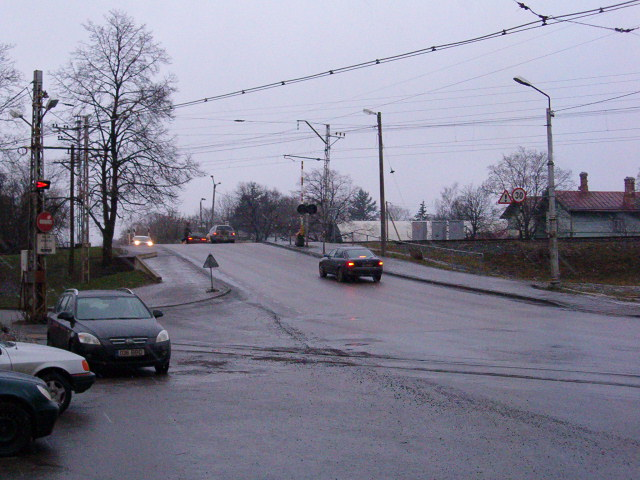
Level crossing of Tondi street.

== See also ==
- List of railway stations in Estonia
- Rail transport in Estonia
- Public transport in Tallinn
