= Nõmme railway station =

Railway station in Tallinn, Estonia

Nõmme
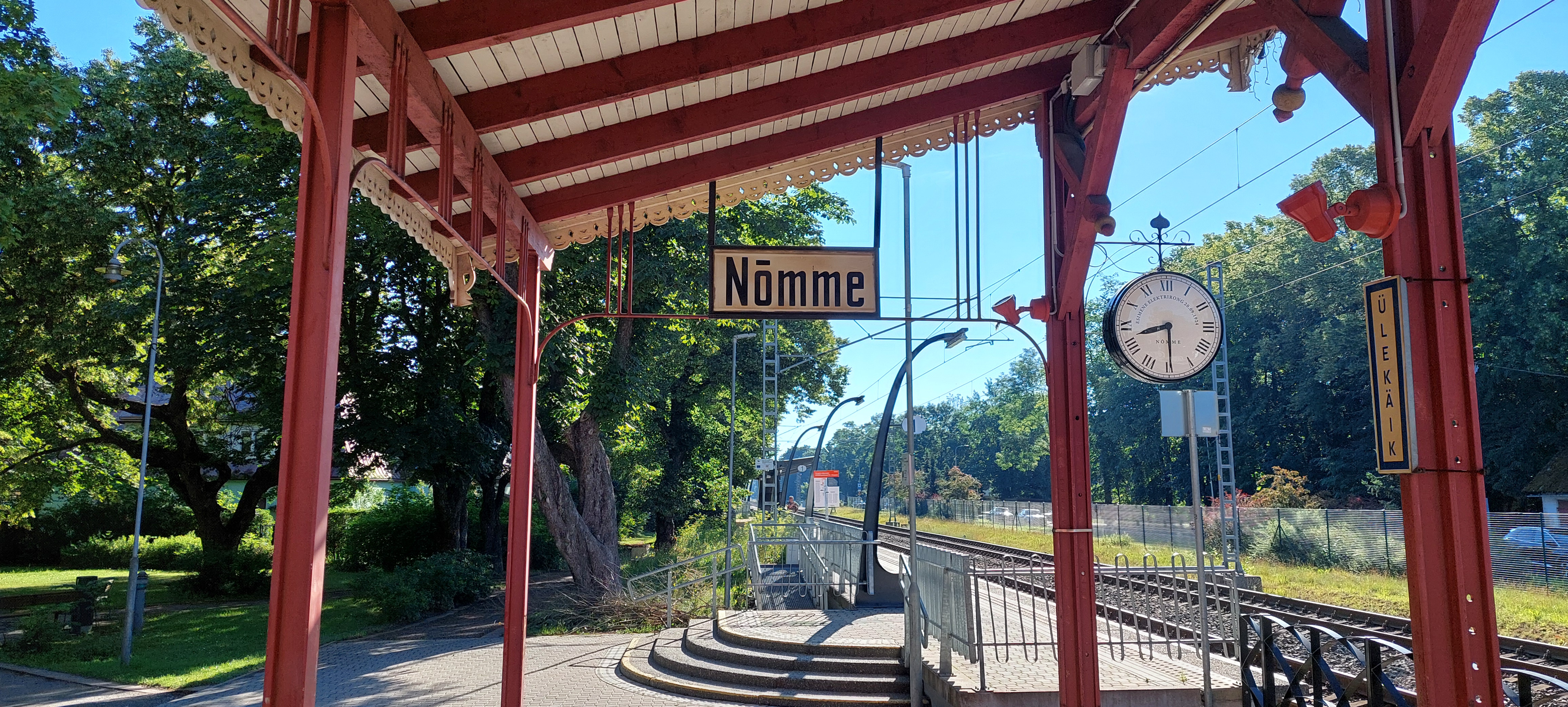
- Nõmme railway station in 2024

General information
- Location: Nõmme, Nõmme, Tallinn, Harju County; Estonia
- Coordinates: 59.3862°N 24.6868°E
- System: railway station
- Owner: Eesti Raudtee (EVR)
- Line: Tallinn Commuter Rail
- Platforms: 2
- Tracks: 2
- Train operators: Elron

Construction
- Structure type: At-grade
- Accessible: Yes

Other information
- Fare zone: I

History
- Opened: 1872
- Electrified: 1924; 3 kV DC OHLE

Services
Preceding station	Elron	Following station
Rahumäe towards Tallinn	Tallinn–Turba/Paldiski	Hiiu towards Turba, Kloogaranna or Paldiski
Location
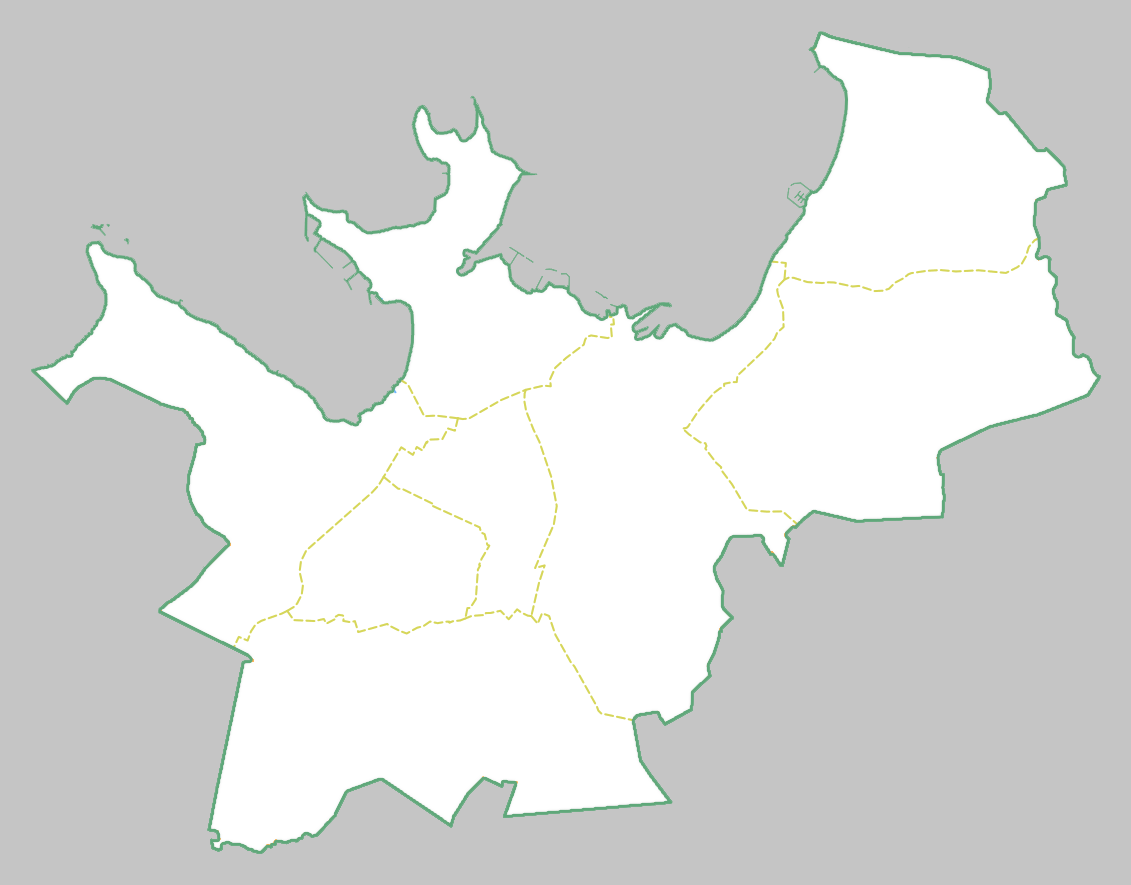
- Location within Estonia Location within Harju County Location within Tallinn

Nõmme railway station (Estonian: Nõmme raudteepeatus; first name in German Haltestelle auf der 7. Werst and in Russian Oстановочный пункт на 7. версте, after 1874 in German Nömme and Russian Неммe) is a railway station in Nõmme, Tallinn, Estonia. The station serves the Nõmme sub-district which has approximately 6600 residents.

The Nõmme railway station is located approximately 8 kilometers (5 mi) southwest from the Baltic station (Estonian: Balti jaam) which is the main railway station of Tallinn, near the Baltic Sea. The station is located between the Rahumäe and Hiiu railway stations of the Tallinn-Keila railway line. The station was opened in 1872, and the station building was completed in 1905. There are two platforms along the two-track railway, one 137 and other 142 meters long.

== History ==
Although the Tallinn-Paldiski railway opened already in 1870, a station on this site was not opened before 1872. The station building was completed in 1905.

== Operations ==
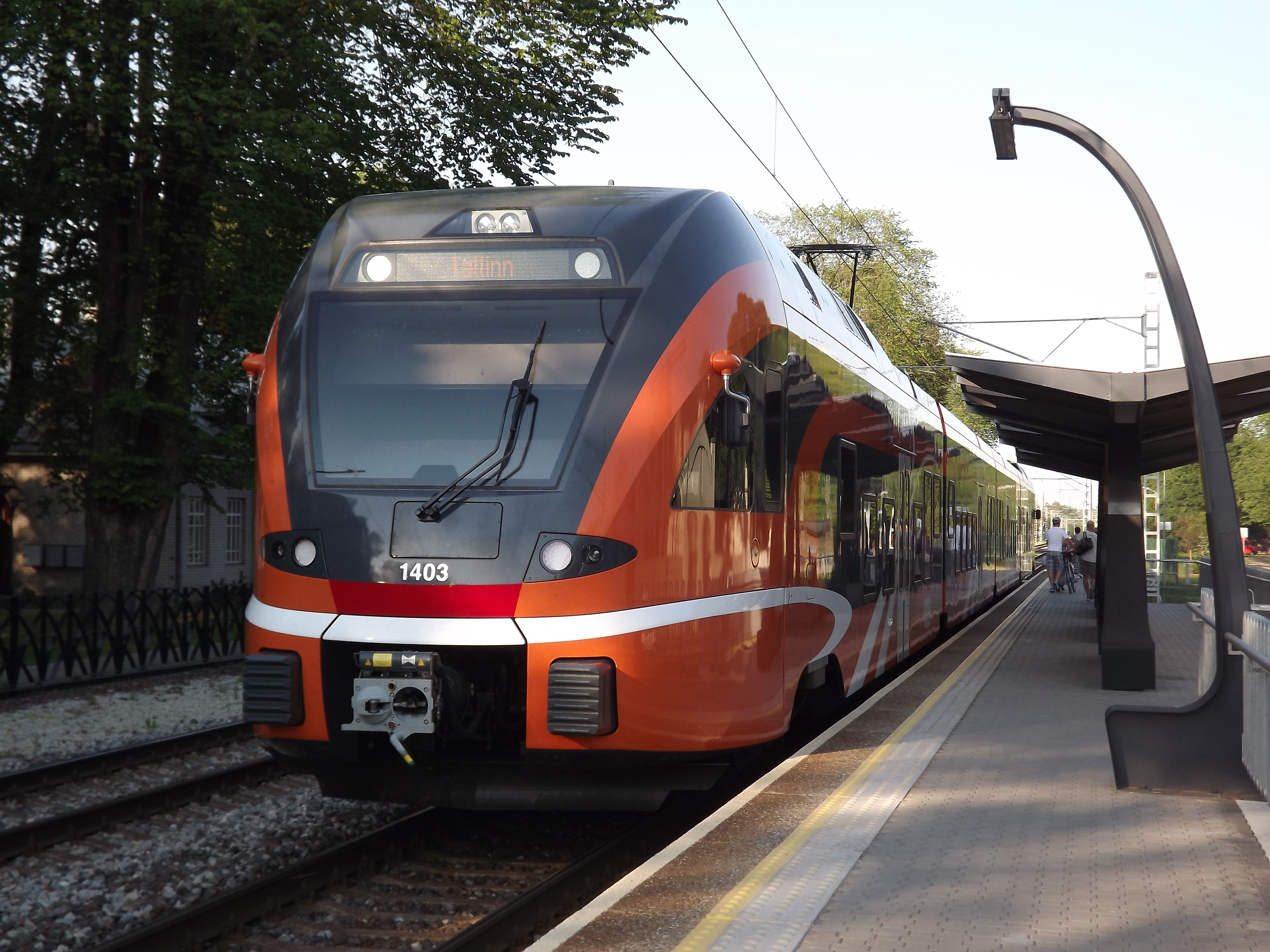
Elron train calling at Nõmme station in 2014.

Elron's electric trains from Tallinn to Keila, Paldiski, Turba and Klooga-Rand stop at Nõmme station. In 2020, there were approximately 58 train departures per day at Nõmme railway station towards Tallinn city center. The station is in Zone I, within which traffic is free for Tallinners. There is a possibility to transfer to TLT (Tallinn City Transport) bus lines 10, 27 and 33 at a bus station on Pärnu maantee and Turu plats and to bus line 36 at a bus station on Pärnu maantee. All bus stations are about a 5-minute walk from the Nõmme railway station.

== Architecture ==
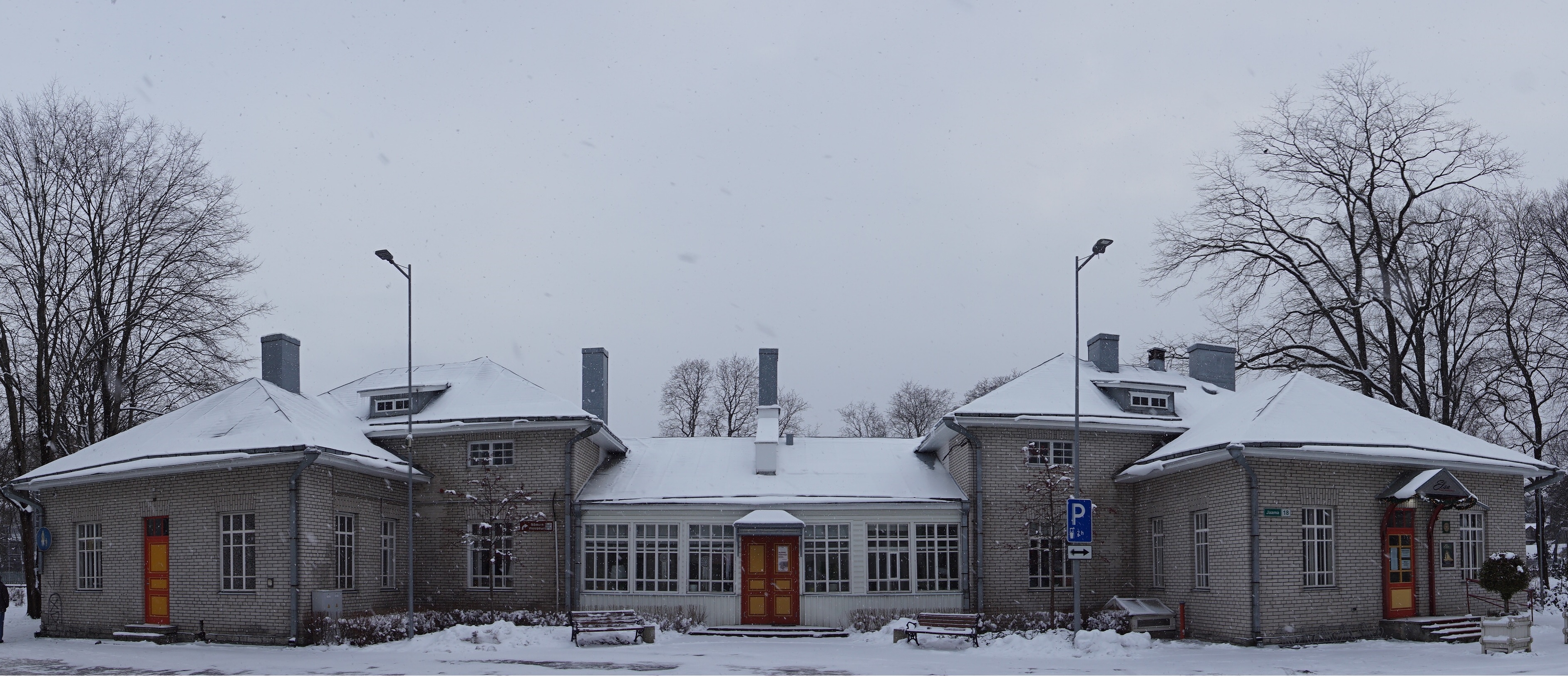
Nõmme railway station

In 1905 the first wooden station building was completed. The station's awning was completed in 1912 but was fully demolished in 1987 during the Soviet occupation. The awning was rebuilt historically accurately in 1999.

== Historical Photos of the Nõmme Railway Station ==
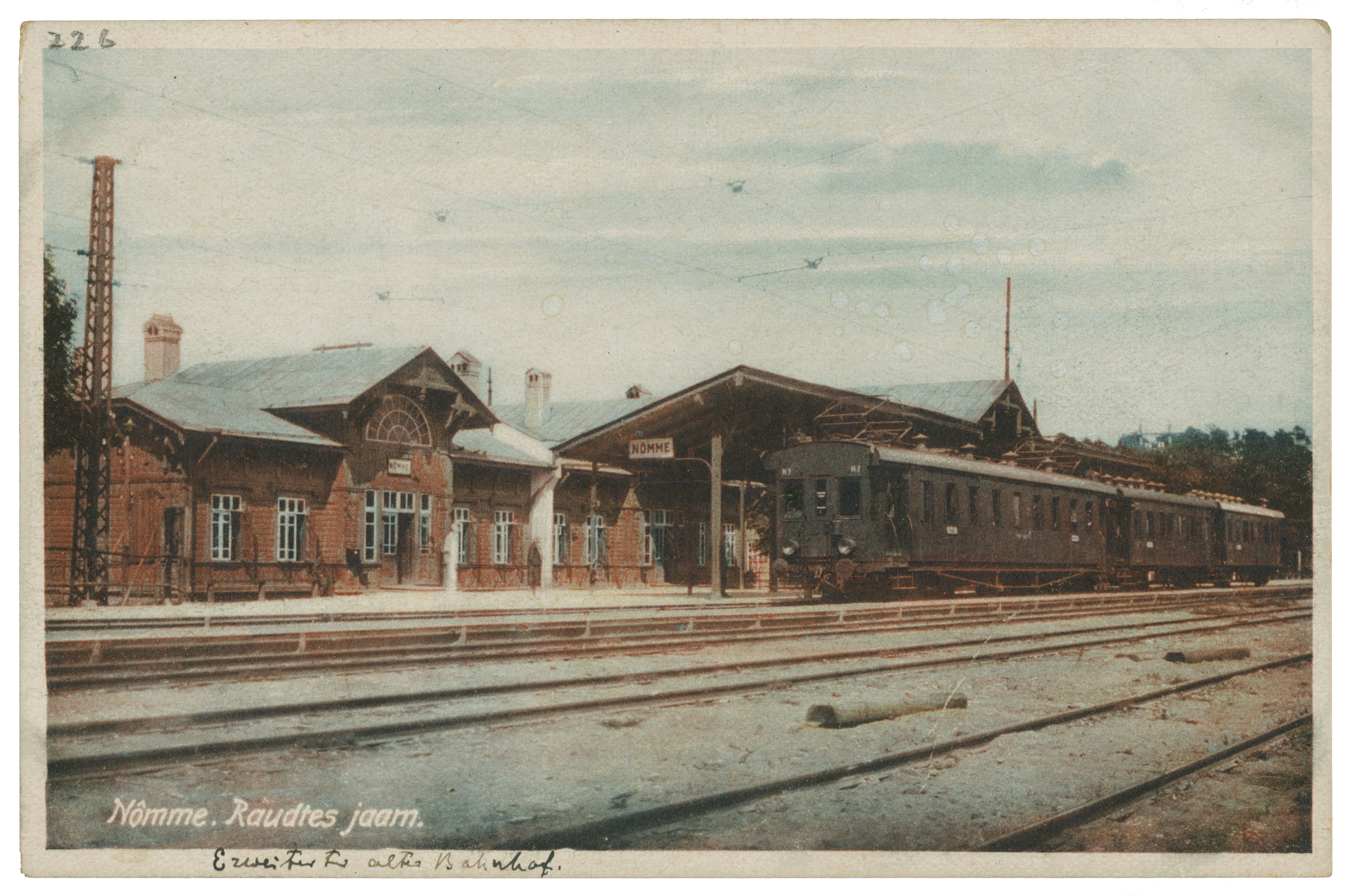
20th century

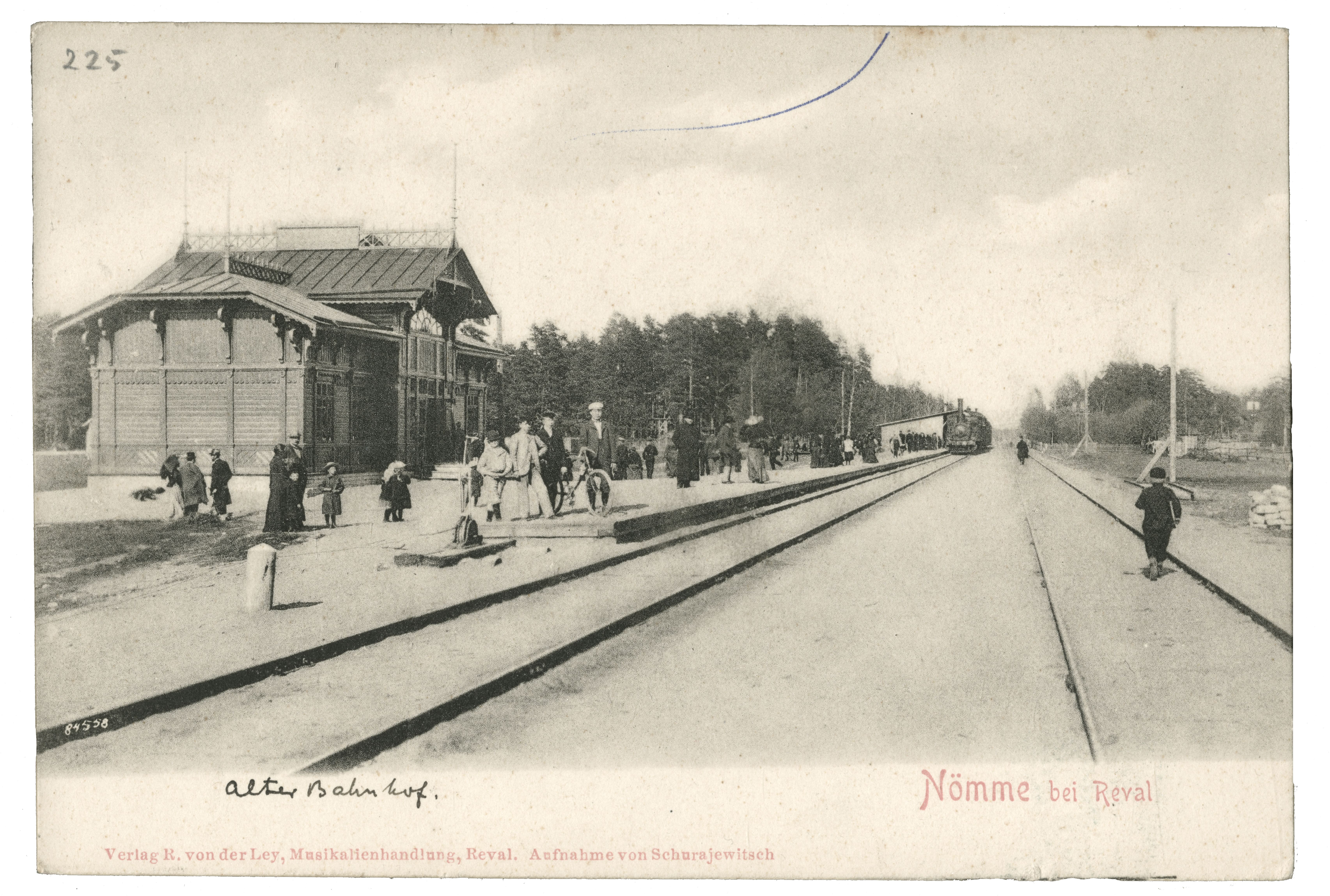
The end of the 19th century

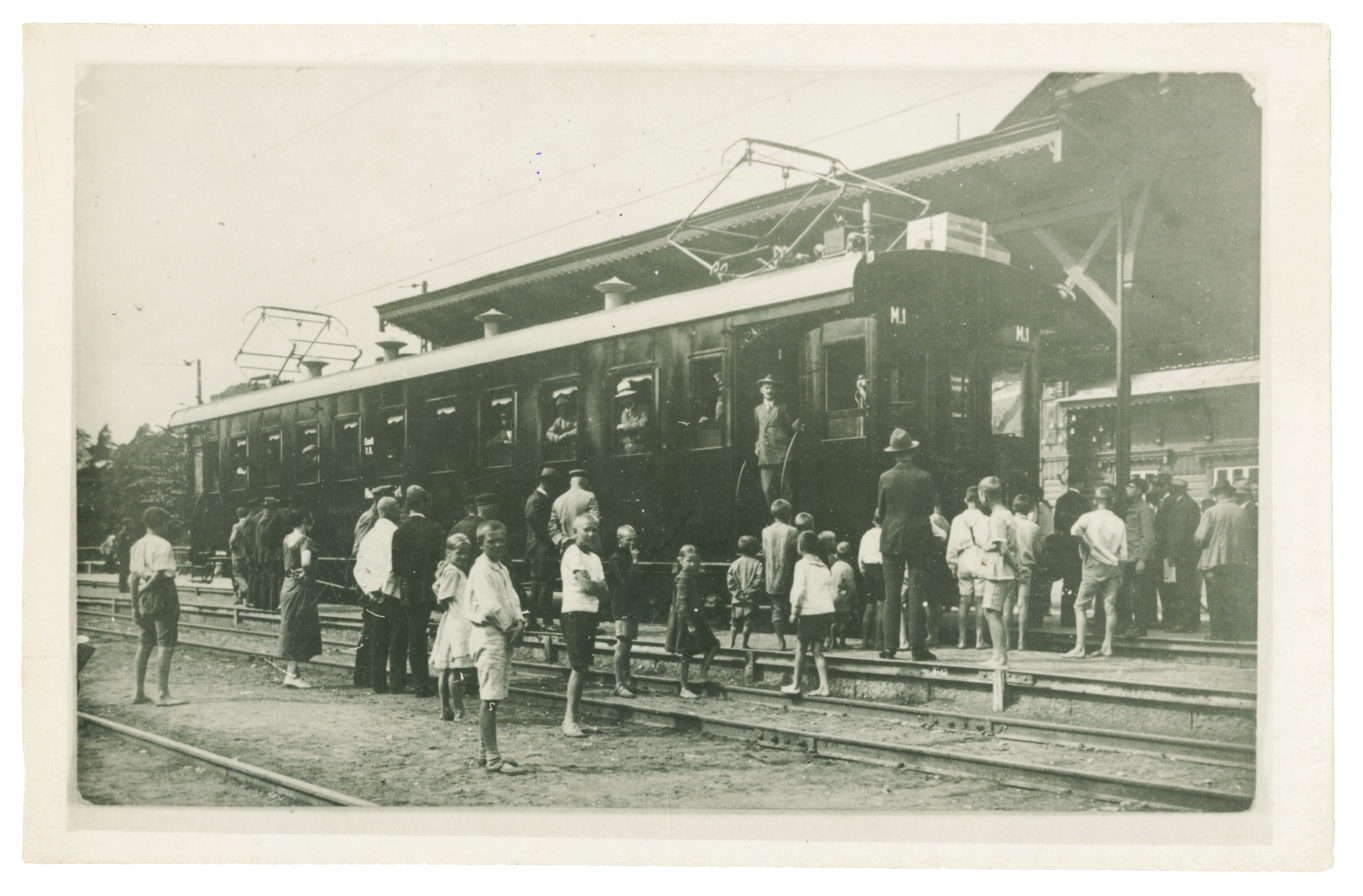
20th century

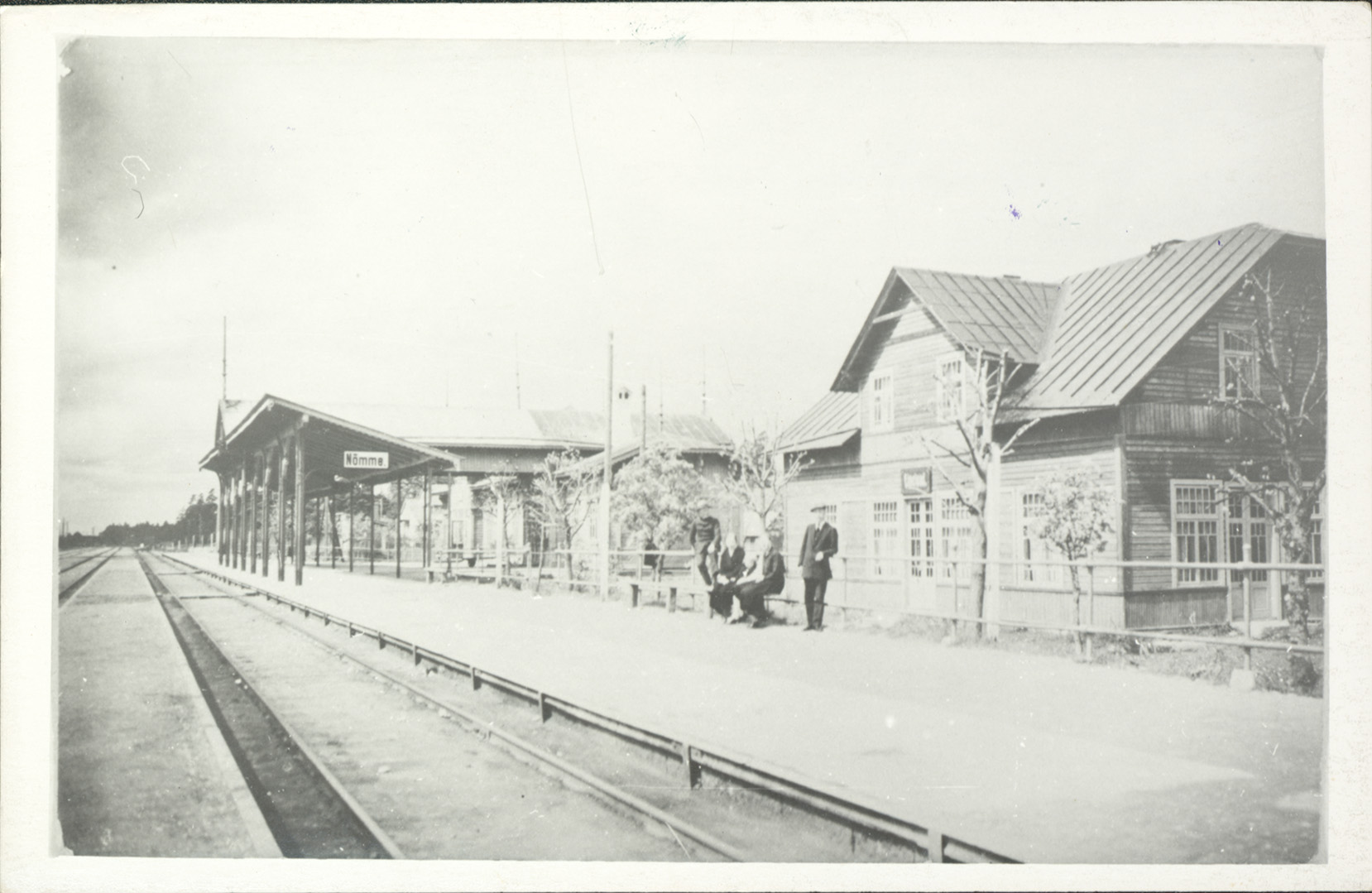
20th century

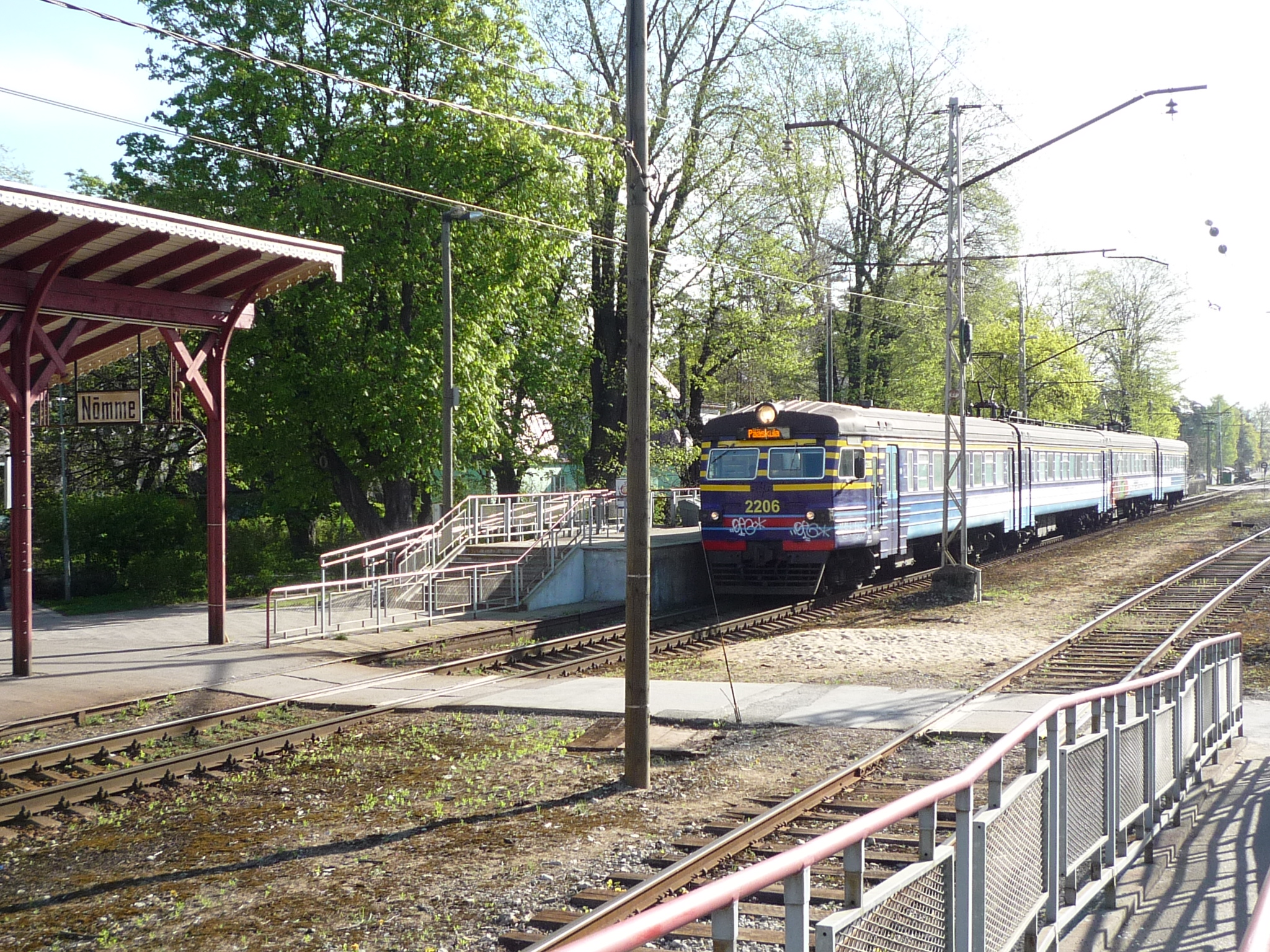
2009

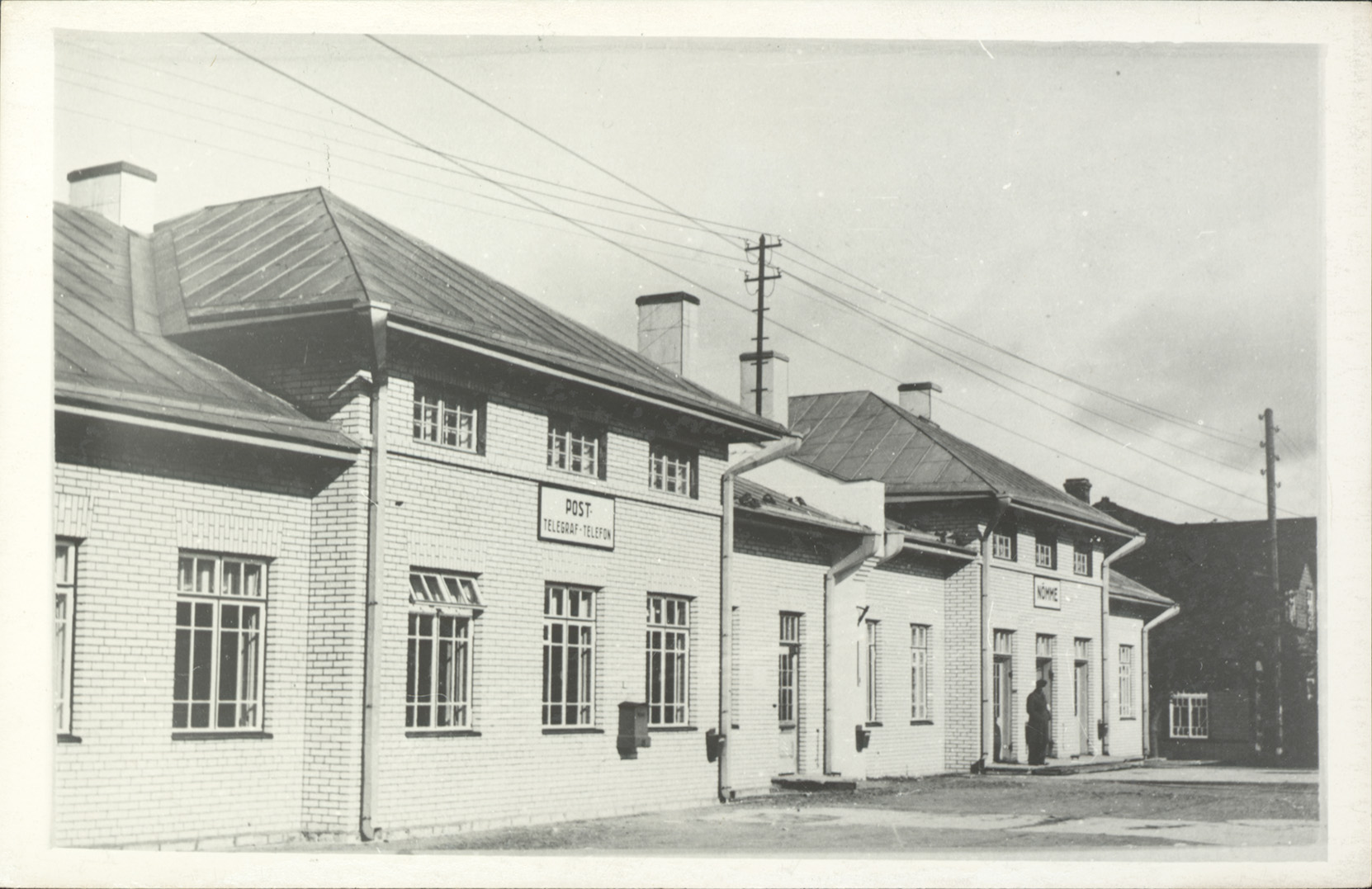
1930s

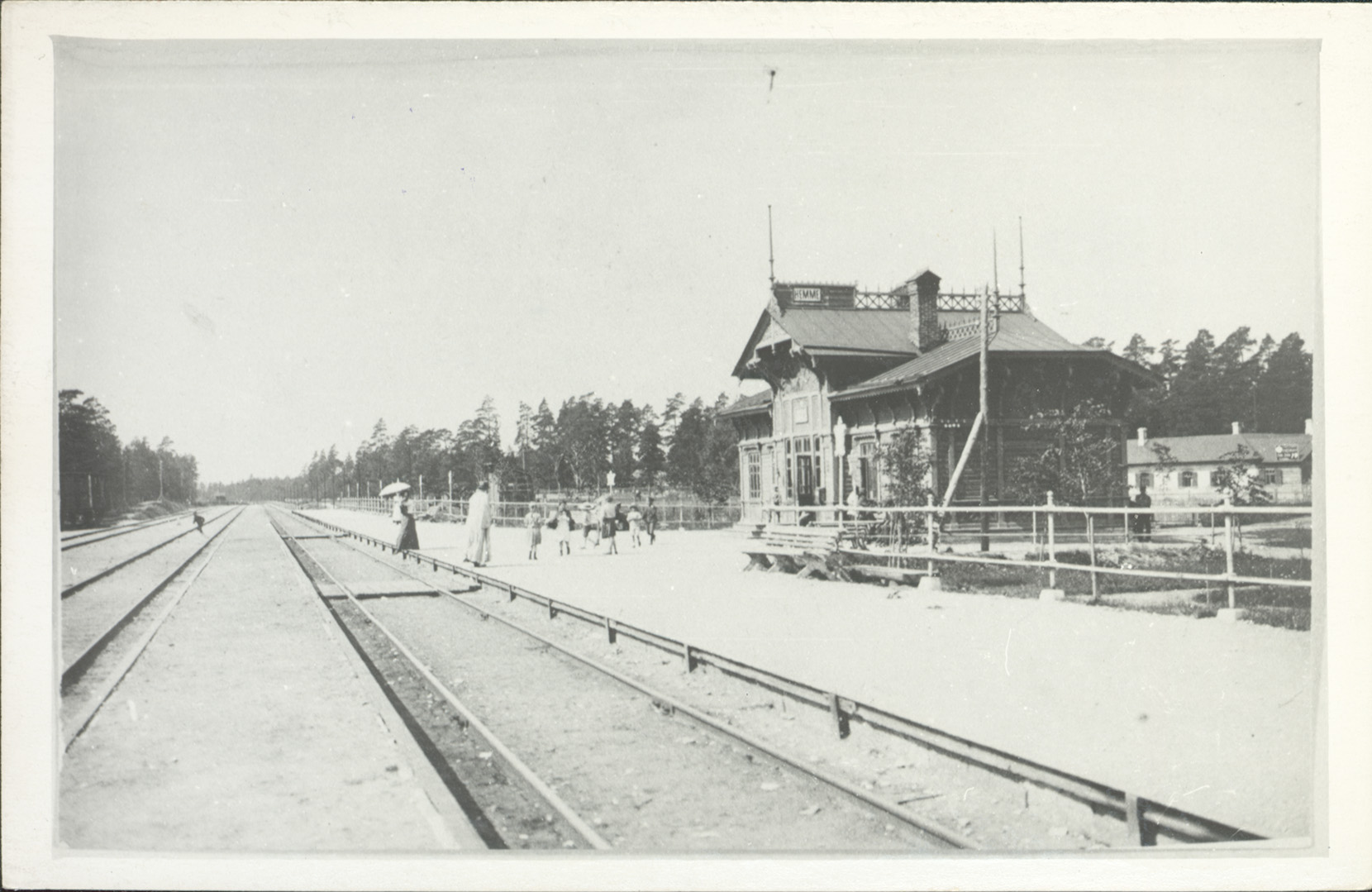
Early 1900s

== See also ==
- List of railway stations in Estonia
- Rail transport in Estonia
- Public transport in Tallinn
