= Järve railway station =

Railway station in Tallinn, Estonia

Järve
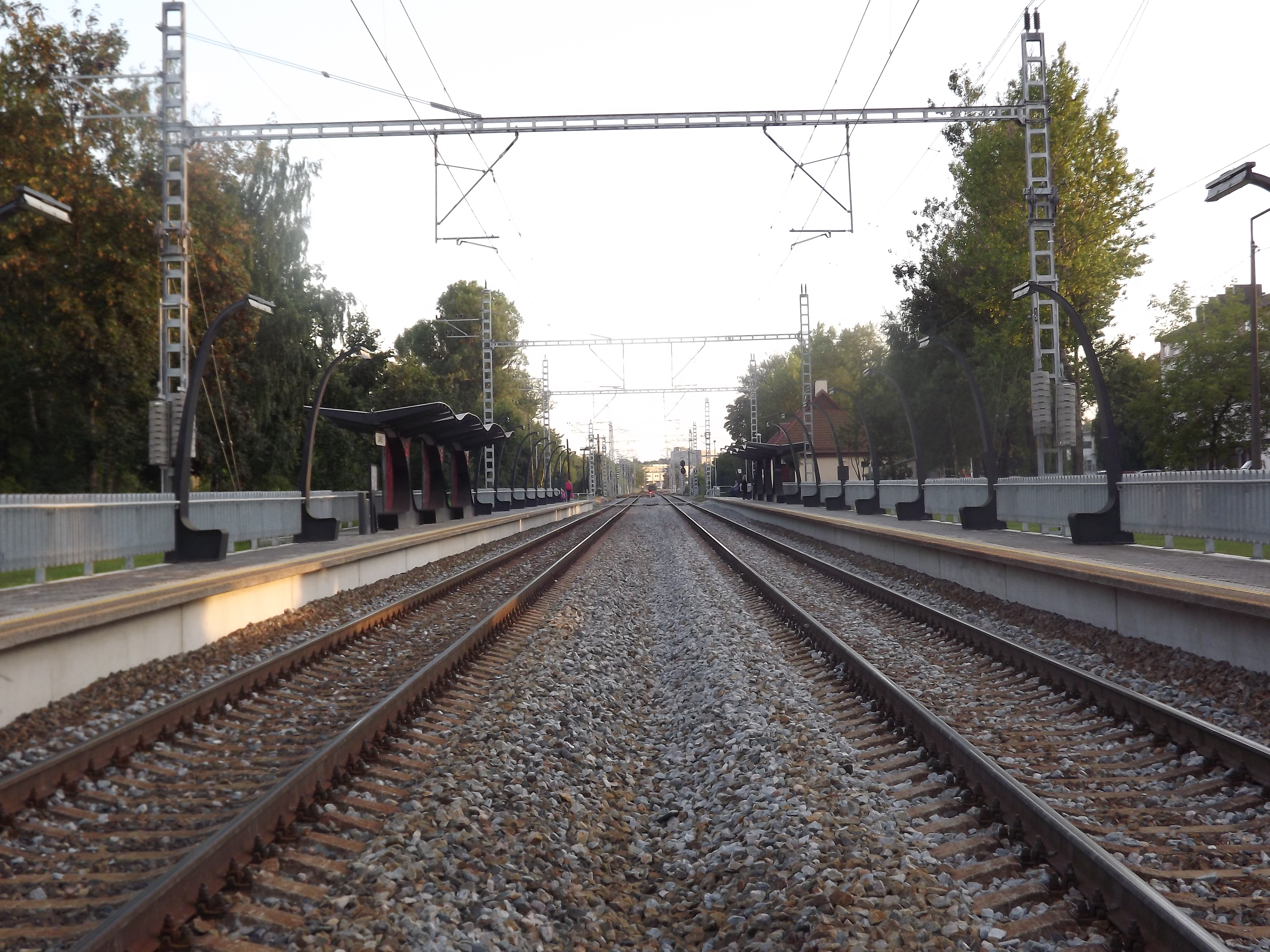
- Järve railway station in 2013

General information
- Location: Järve, Kristiine, Tallinn, Harju County; Estonia
- Coordinates: 59.400561°N 24.724389°E
- System: railway station
- Owner: Eesti Raudtee (EVR)
- Line: Tallinn commuter rail
- Platforms: 2
- Tracks: 2
- Train operators: Elron

Construction
- Accessible: Yes

Other information
- Fare zone: I

History
- Opened: 1923
- Electrified: 3 kV DC OHLE

Services
Preceding station	Elron	Following station
Tondi towards Tallinn	Tallinn–Turba/Paldiski	Rahumäe towards Turba, Kloogaranna or Paldiski
Location
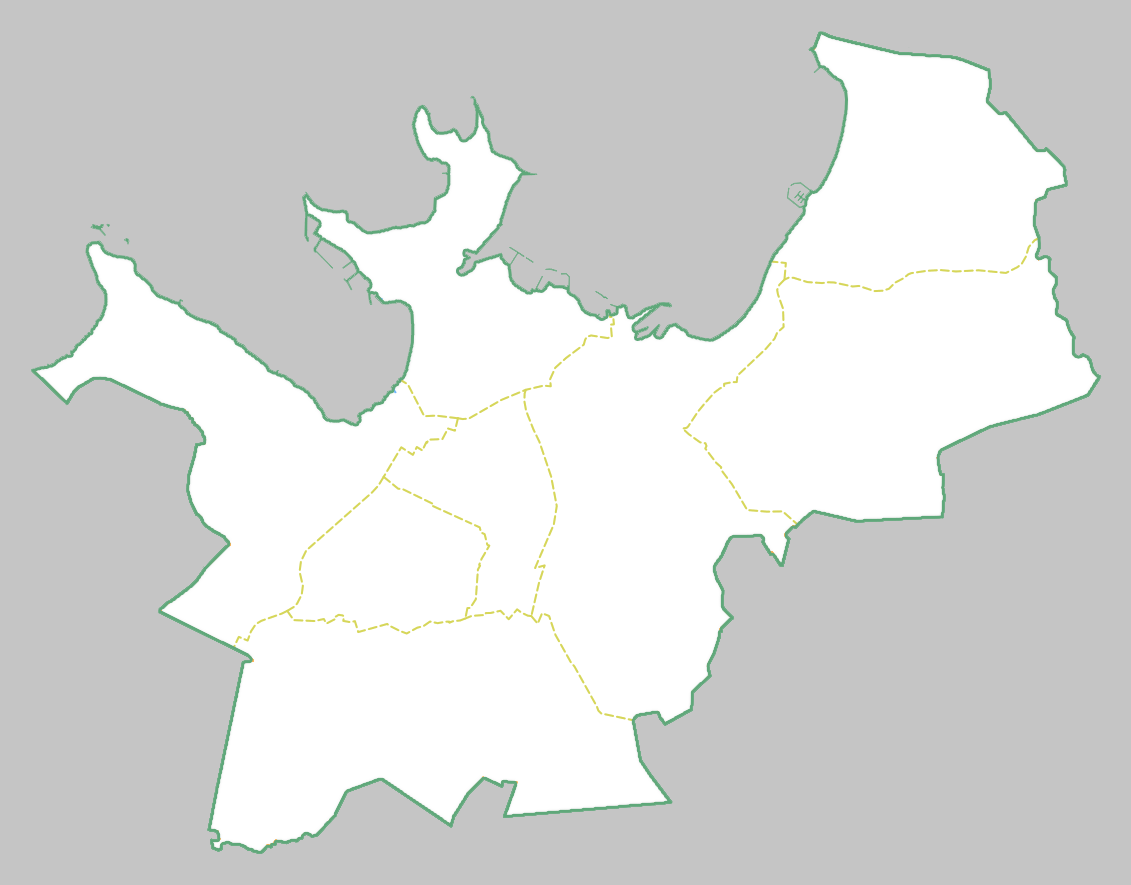
- Location within Estonia Location within Harju County Location within Tallinn

Järve railway station (Estonian: Järve raudteepeatus) is a railway station in the Kristiine district of Tallinn, Estonia. The station serves the Järve sub-district which has approximately 3000 residents.

The station is located approximately 5 km (3.1 mi) south from the Baltic station (Estonian: Balti jaam) which is the main railway station of Tallinn, near the Baltic Sea. Järve station is located between the Tondi and Rahumäe railway stations of the Tallinn-Keila railway line.

The station was opened in 1923, and the station building was completed in 1926. There are two platforms along the two-track railway, both 150 meters long.

== History ==
Although the Tallinn-Paldiski railway opened already in 1870, a station on this site was not opened before 1923. The station building was completed in 1926. Ticket sale was terminated in the station building in 1998.

== Operations ==
Elron's electric trains from Tallinn to Keila, Paldiski, Turba and Kloogaranna stop at Järve station. The station is in Zone I, within which traffic is free for Tallinners. In 2022, there were approximately 45 train departures per day at Järve railway station towards Tallinn city center.

There is a possibility to transfer to TLT (Tallinn City Transport) bus line 5, 18, 32, 45 and 57 at a bus stop on Pärnu maantee.

== Architecture ==
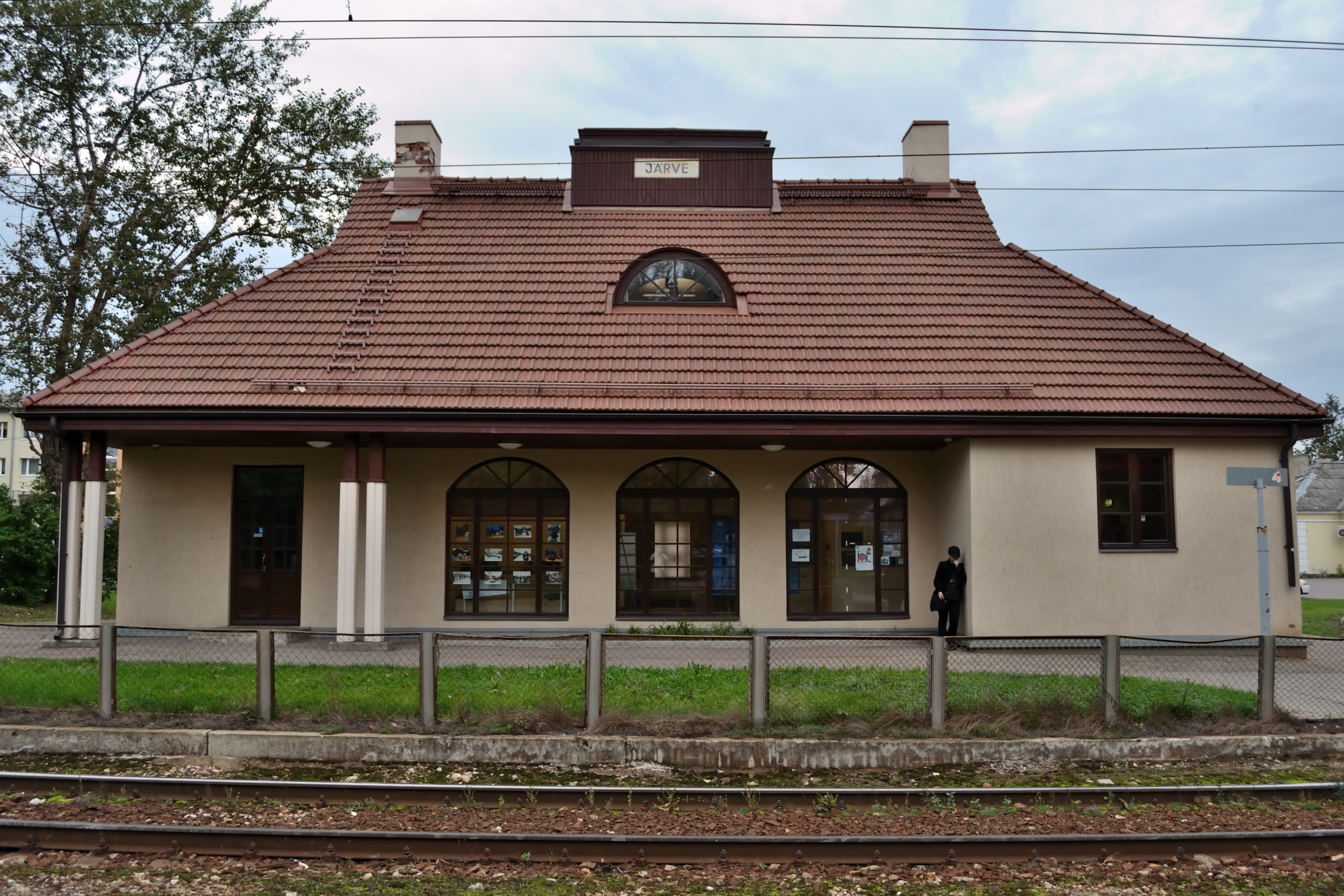
The station building from 1926.

The station building in national romantic style was built in 1926 to designs by the Estonian architect and painter Karl Burman (1882–1965).

== See also ==
- List of railway stations in Estonia
- Rail transport in Estonia
- Public transport in Tallinn
