= Rahumäe railway station =

Railway station in Tallinn, Estonia

Rahumäe
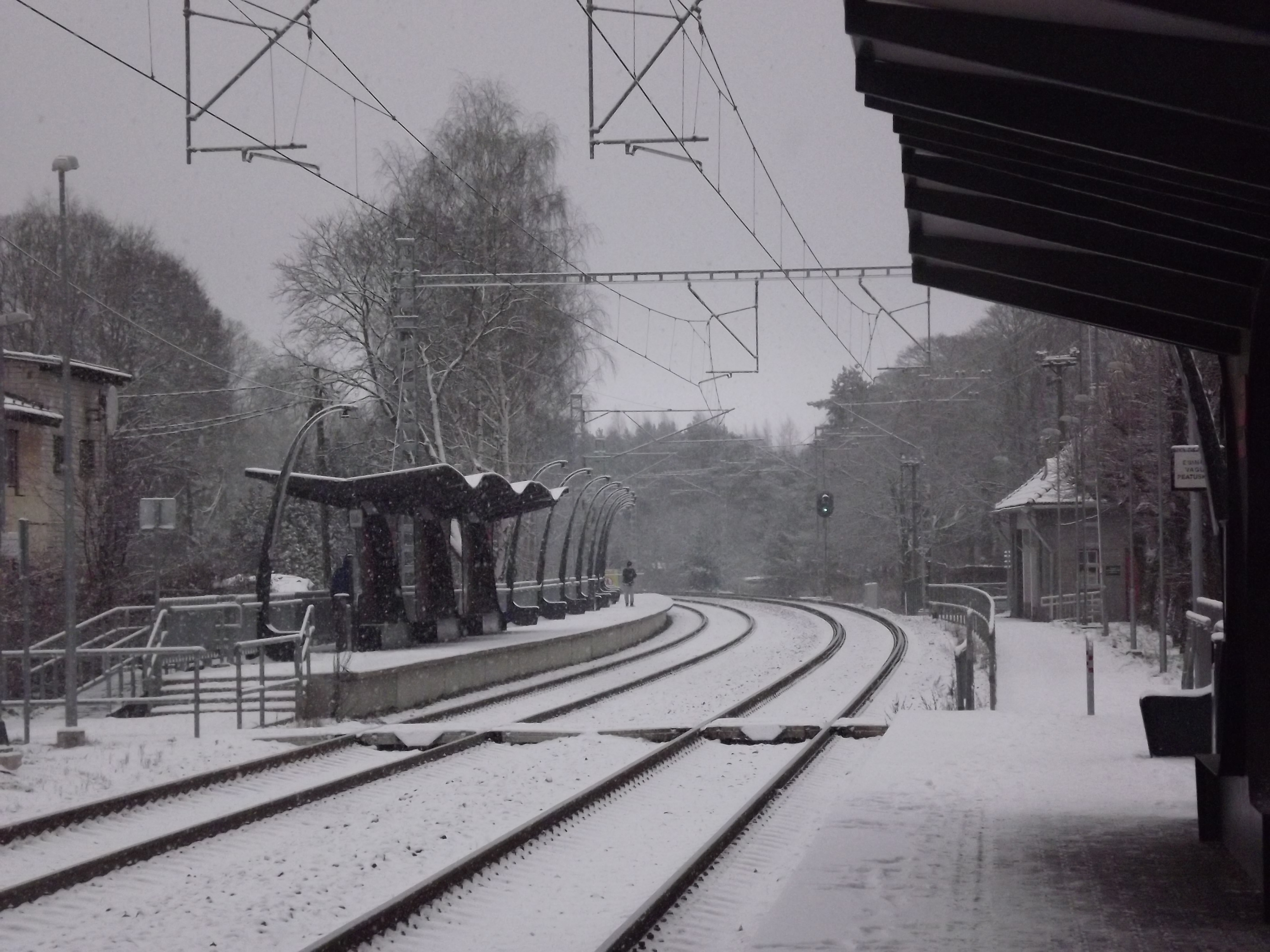
- Rahumäe railway station in 2014

General information
- Location: Rahumäe, Nõmme, Tallinn; Harju County; Estonia
- Coordinates: 59.3887°N 24.7029°E
- System: railway station
- Owner: Eesti Raudtee (EVR)
- Line: Tallinn commuter rail
- Platforms: 2
- Tracks: 2
- Train operators: Elron
- Connections: Buses 23 36 45

Construction
- Accessible: Yes

Other information
- Fare zone: I

History
- Opened: 1926
- Electrified: 3 kV DC OHLE

Services
Preceding station	Elron	Following station
Järve towards Tallinn	Tallinn–Turba/Paldiski	Nõmme towards Turba, Kloogaranna or Paldiski
Location

Rahumäe railway station (Estonian: Rahumäe raudteepeatus) is a railway station serving Rahumäe, a subdistrict of the Nõmme district of Tallinn, Estonia. Rahumäe has approximately 3000 residents.

The station is approximately 6.8 kilometers (4.2 mi) southwest from the Baltic station (Estonian: Balti jaam) which is the main railway station of Tallinn, near the Baltic Sea. The Rahumäe railway station is located between the Järve and Nõmme railway stations of the Tallinn-Keila railway line.

The station was opened in 1926, and the station building was completed in 1930. There are two platforms along the two-track railway, both 146 meters long.

== History ==
Although the Tallinn-Paldiski railway opened already in 1870, a station on this site was not opened before 1926. The station building was completed in 1930. Ticket sale was terminated in the station building in 1998.

== Operations ==
Elron's electric trains from Tallinn to Keila, Paldiski, Turba and Klooga-Rand stop at Rahumäe station. The station belongs to the Zone I, within which traffic is free for Tallinners. In 2020, there were approximately 58 train departures per day at Rahumäe railway station towards Tallinn city center.

There is a possibility to transfer to TLT (Tallinn City Transport) bus lines 36 and 45 at a bus stop on Pärnu maantee and to bus line 23 at a bus stop on Rahumäe tee.

== See also ==
- List of railway stations in Estonia
- Rail transport in Estonia
- Public transport in Tallinn
