= Kändler =

Kändler, Kaendler:

- Johann Joachim Kändler (1706–1775), the most important modelleur of the Meissen porcelain manufacture
  - 5195 Kaendler (3289 T-1), a main-belt asteroid discovered in 1971
- Tiit Kändler (born 1948), Estonian humorist, publicist and science journalist
