= Haapsalu railway station =

Historic railway station in Estonia

Haapsalu Railway Station
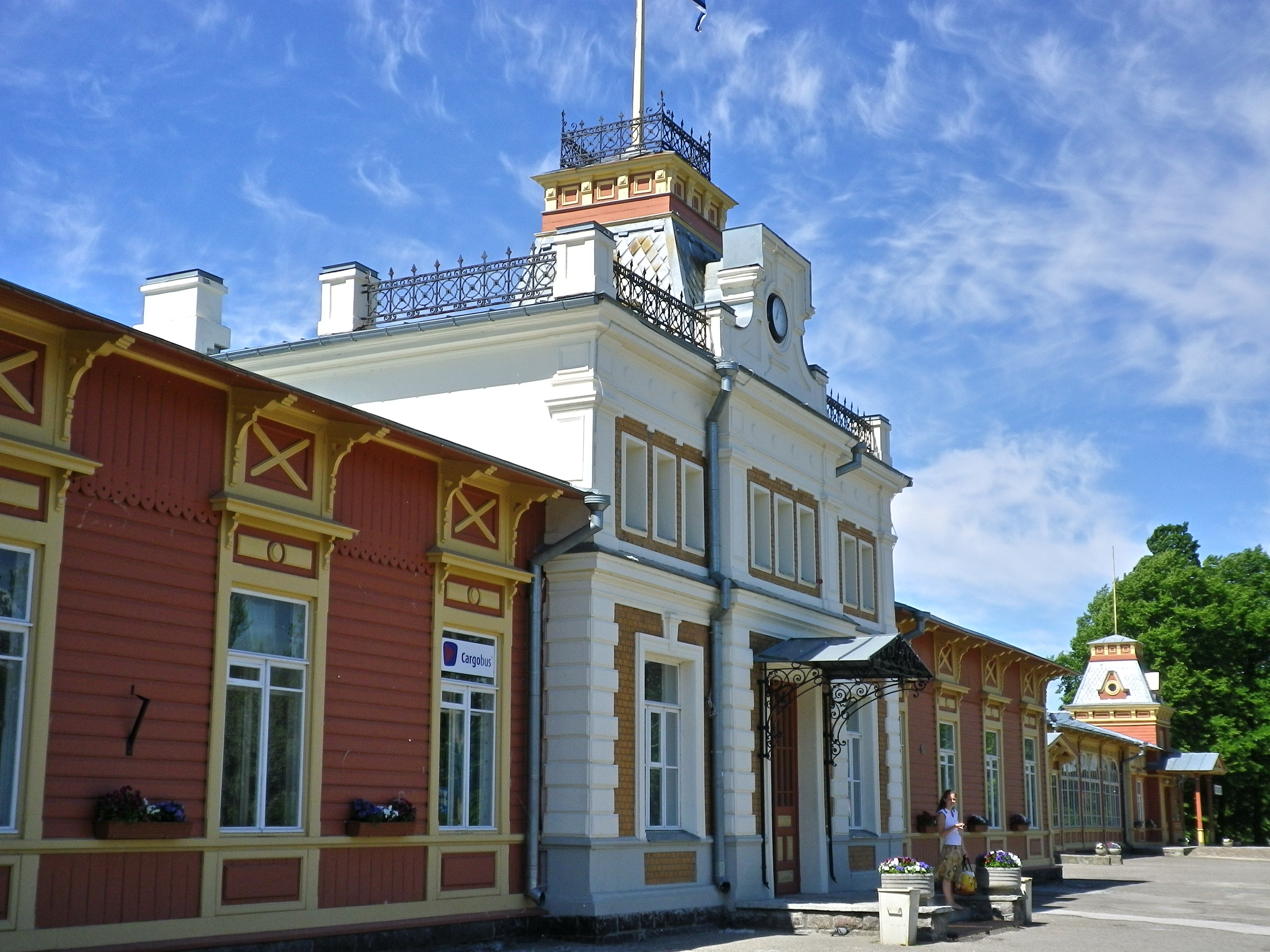
- The station in 2010.

General information
- Location: Haapsalu, Lääne County; Estonia
- Coordinates: 58.9381°N 23.5322°E

History
- Opened: December 1904
- Closed: 2004
Location
- Location within Estonia Location within Lääne County

Haapsalu Railway Station (Estonian: Haapsalu raudteejaam) is a historic building that served as the main railway station in the seaside resort town of Haapsalu, located on the west coast of Estonia.

Construction on the wooden station started in May 1904, with limited train service starting in December 1904. The railway station consists of several buildings: the passenger terminal, a train control pavilion, a covered terrace and a covered platform with a length of 216 metres.

The single-storey terminal is topped with wooden lace. The two-storey stone waiting room has a clock tower on its north-eastern facade. The interior of the structure has stucco ceilings and floors made of small ceramic tiles; sea views were painted in the 1950s.

The station building was designed by architect Karl Verheim and engineer V. Vestfalen, with main construction taking place during 1905–1907. Regular passenger trains used the station until September 1995 and cargo trains until 2004. As of 2014, most of the track has been removed and the former rail bed is used as a bicycle path.

== See also ==
- List of railway stations in Estonia
- History of rail transport in Estonia
