= Laoküla, Harju County =

Village in Estonia

Laoküla
- Village
- Interactive map of Laoküla
- Country: Estonia
- County: Harju County
- Parish: Lääne-Harju Parish

Population (2000)
  - Total: 40
- Time zone: UTC+2 (EET)
  - Summer (DST): UTC+3 (EEST)

Laoküla is a village in Lääne-Harju Parish, Harju County in northern Estonia. It is bordered to the north by the city of Paldiski.

The borders of the village extend beyond current dwellings, and so its area is home to several abandoned buildings and their ruins; some are from the Soviet era, and some from before.

== In popular culture ==
On the outskirts of Laoküla, a derelict building is near the shore (59.327337°N 24.103941°E). It has served as a setting in two music videos.

In January 2008, the Estonian rap group Def Räädu released their video for "Vaatenurga turist", prominently featuring the building.

In late 2015, the same ruins were featured in the last scene of the music video for "Faded", a song by Norwegian DJ Alan Walker. "Faded" was at one point the 21st most-viewed video on YouTube, with over 2.8 billion views as of October 2020.

== Transit ==
Laoküla has a station on the Elron western route.

Preceding station	Elron	Following station
Põllküla towards Tallinn	Tallinn–Turba/Paldiski	Paldiski Terminus
