= Tiit Kändler =

Estonian humorist, publicist and science journalist

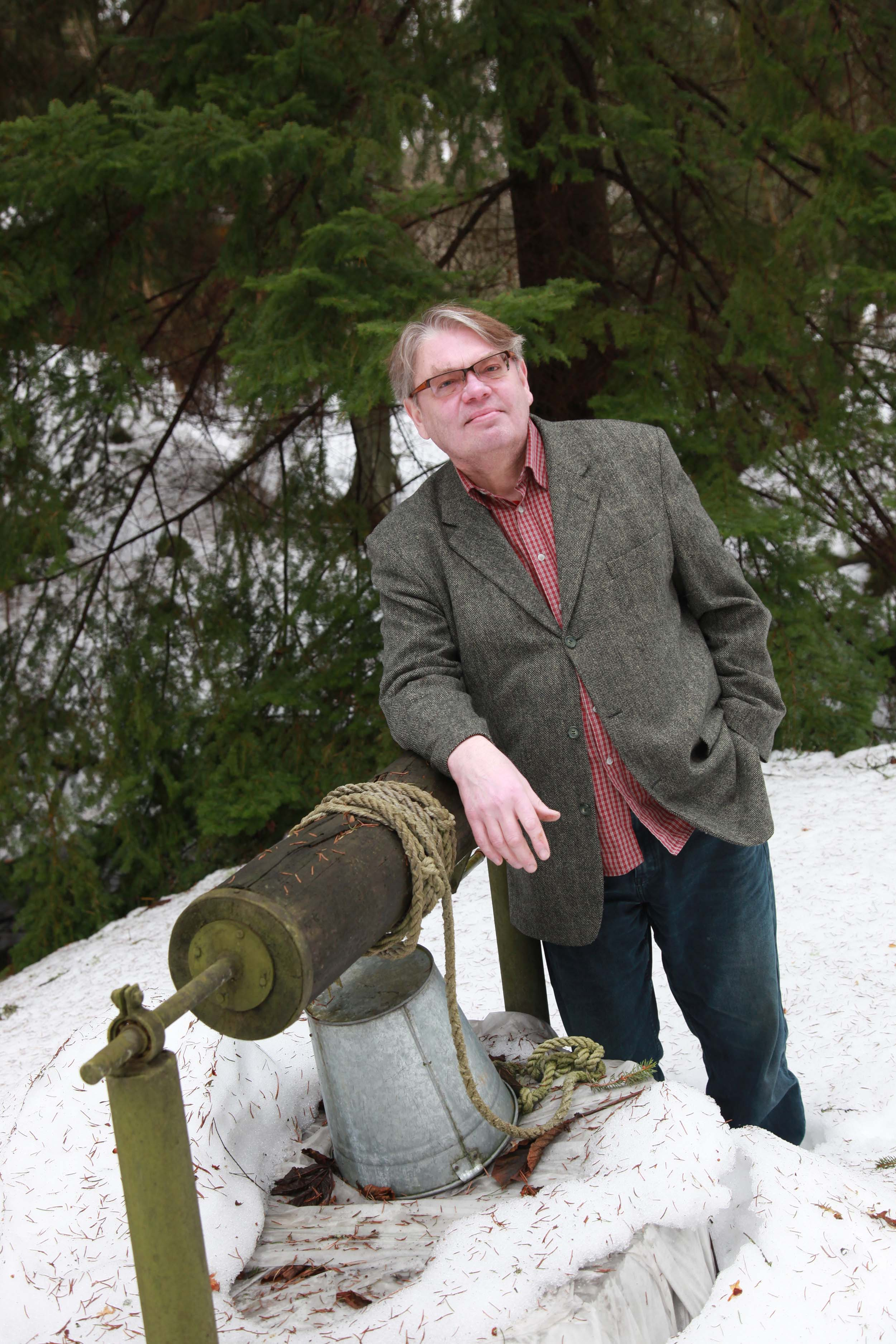
Tiit Kändler

Tiit Kändler (born on 4 October 1948 Turba, Harju County) is an Estonian humorist, publicist and science journalist.

From 1967 to 1972 he studied physics at the University of Tartu.

He has been the editor of several publications, e.g. Maaleht, Vaatleja and Eesti Päevaleht.
