= Paldiski railway station =

Railway station in Paldiski, Estonia

Paldiski
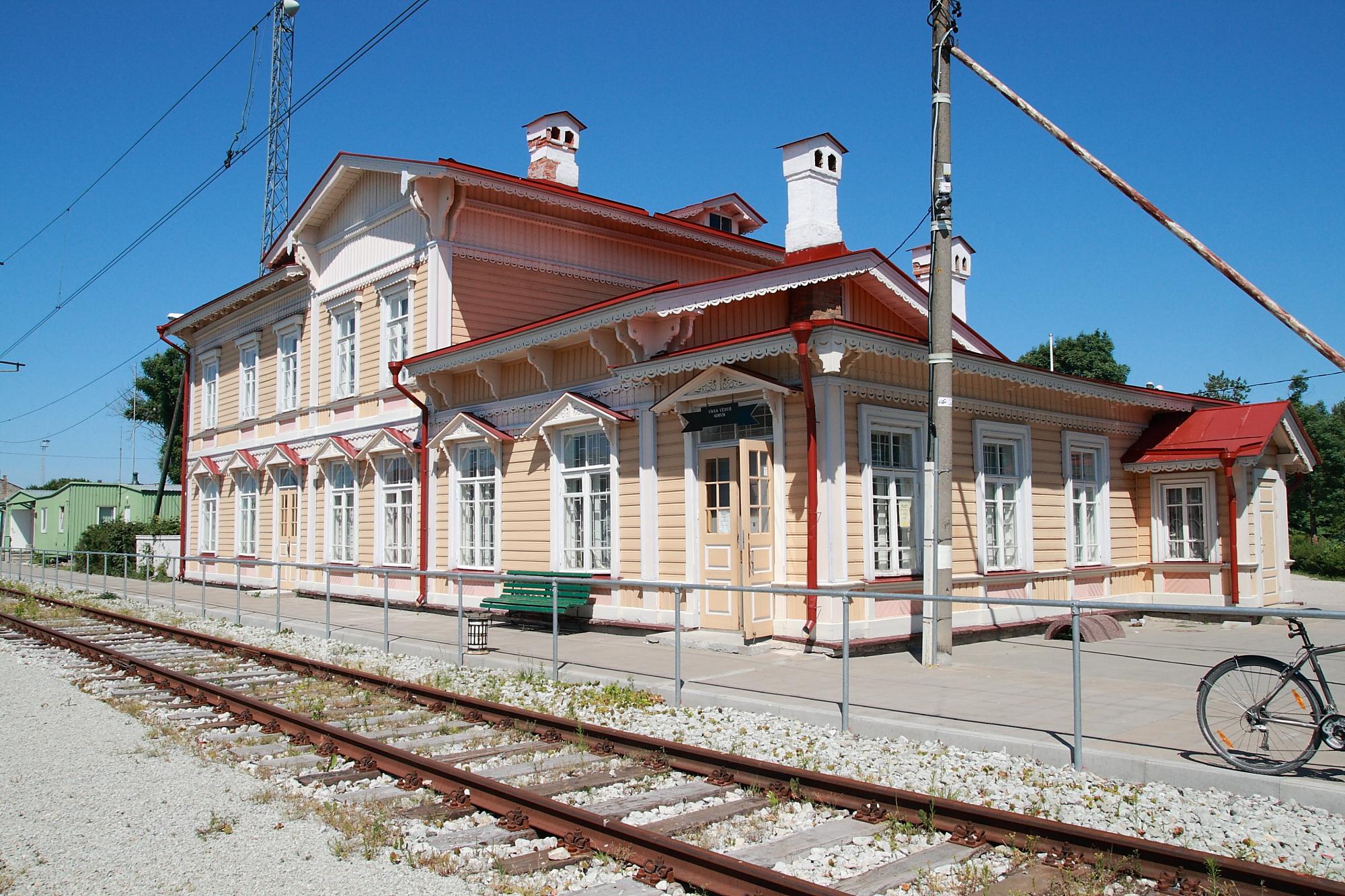
- Paldiski railway station in 2011

General information
- Location: Paldiski, Lääne-Harju Parish, Harju County; Estonia
- Coordinates: 59°20′40.3″N 24°3′35.9″E
- System: Terminal train station
- Owner: Eesti Raudtee (EVR)
- Platforms: 1
- Tracks: 6
- Train operators: Elron
- Connections: Regional Buses P4 P5 110 136 145

Construction
- Structure type: At-grade
- Parking: Yes; Next to the station
- Cycle facilities: Yes; Next to the station
- Accessible: yes

Other information
- Fare zone: IV

History
- Opened: 1870; 156 years ago
- Electrified: 1961

Services
Preceding station	Elron	Following station
Laoküla towards Tallinn	Tallinn–Turba/Paldiski	Terminus
Location

Paldiski railway station (Estonian: Paldiski raudteejaam) is a railway station serving the town and Baltic Sea port of Paldiski, situated on the Pakri Peninsula of northwestern Estonia.

The station is the western terminus of the Tallinn-Paldiski Railway. It was opened in 1870 as part of a railway line linking Paldiski with Gatchina, which was subsequently connected to Saint Petersburg later that year. Currently, the station is served by Tallinn's commuter rail network, an electrified commuter rail network operated by Elron, linking the city of Tallinn with its suburbs and the surrounding countryside.

== History ==
The station opened in 1870 as a means to connect the Baltic Port at Paldiski, built under the orders of Peter the Great, with Saint-Petersburg. The line initially ran to Gatchina, with intermediate stops at Tallinn, Tapa and Narva. In the same year, it was connected to the Saint Petersburg–Warsaw railway, providing a link to the Russian city.

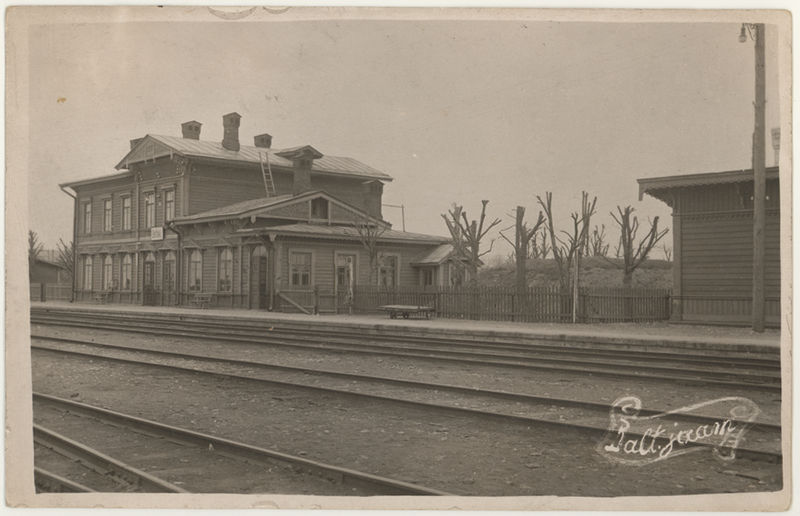
The station building in 1924

The station building was built in a typical fashion for one of its size, adhering to the 3rd class Baltic railway designs of the time. The construction cost 20,000 Tsarist Rubles. The interior was decorated with four oak benches in the main hall, as well as sofas in the departure lounge for first class passengers, which was split into separate rooms for men and women. During the 20th century some of the original decorative elements were lost from the roof and overhangs, however it still remains the best preserved Estonian station building of its time. In 1999, the building was added to Estonia's National Register of Cultural Monuments, being assigned number 21522.

The area surrounding the station was well-equipped, having to accommodate for the needs of the port and its workers. It had housing for railway employees, barracks-style housing for those working at the port, and large freight yards, converted from barracks and prisons, complete with a pumping station and a turntable. The complex also had a sauna.

The main station building was used for its intended purpose until 1999, when it came under private ownership, at which point it was no longer possible to buy tickets or use the waiting rooms. A cafe was opened in the building soon after, however it closed down in 2012.

== See also ==
- List of railway stations in Estonia
- Rail transport in Estonia
- History of rail transport in Estonia
