= Turba, Estonia =

Borough in Estonia

Turba
- Small borough
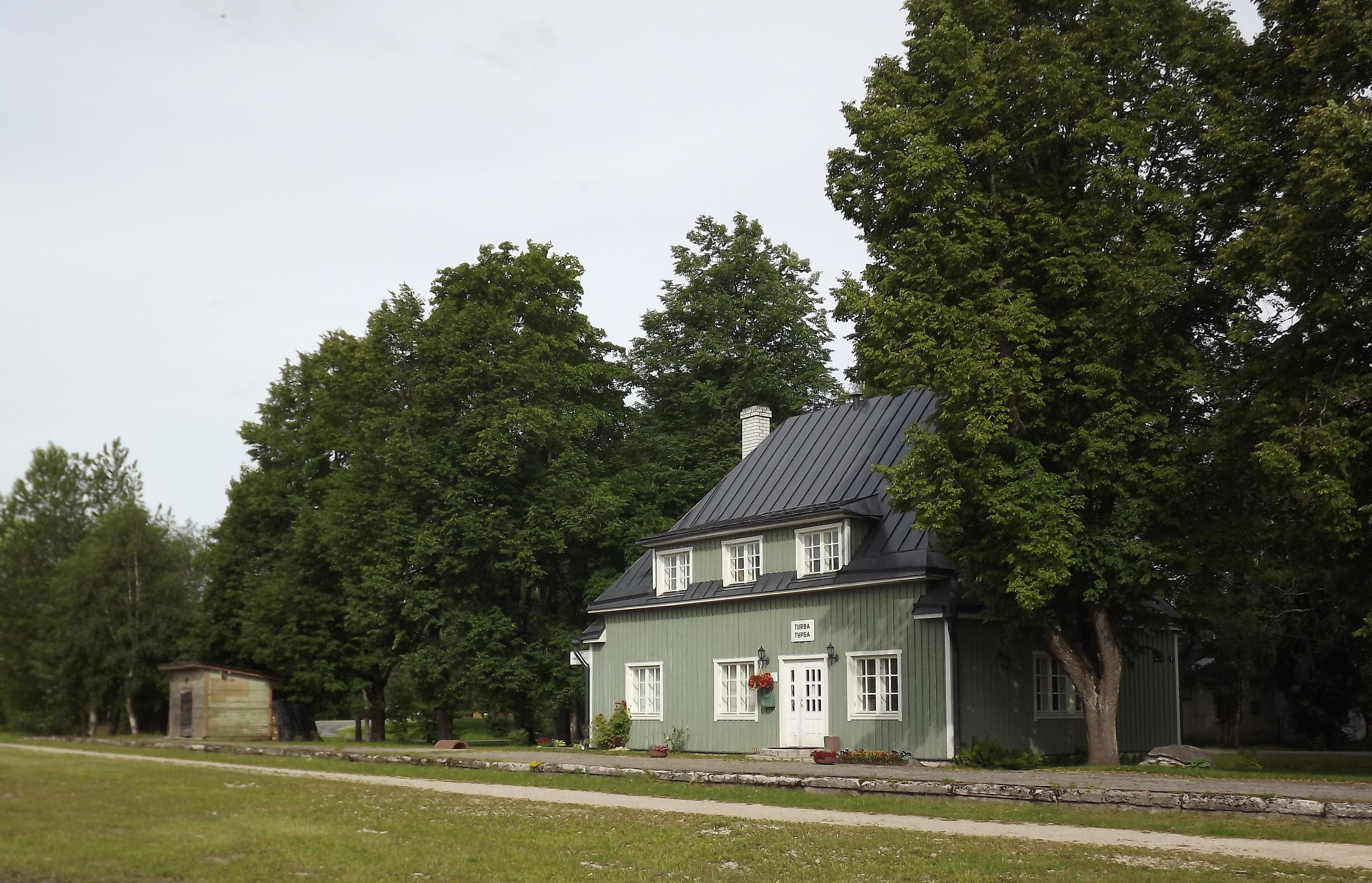
- Train station in Turba

- Location in Estonia
- Coordinates: 59°05′30″N 24°14′00″E
- Country: Estonia
- County: Harju County
- Municipality: Saue Parish

Population (2019)
  - Total: 964

Turba is a small borough (Estonian: alevik) in Saue Parish, Harju County, Estonia. Prior to the administrative reform of Estonian local governments in March 2017, Turba belonged to Nissi Parish. As of the 2011 census, the settlement's population was 927. In 2019, the population was found to have risen to 964.

Science journalist and humorist Tiit Kändler was born in Turba.

Turba railway station re-opened on 8 December 2019 after being closed to passenger services since September 1995. Hourly electric train services to Tallinn are provided by Elron.

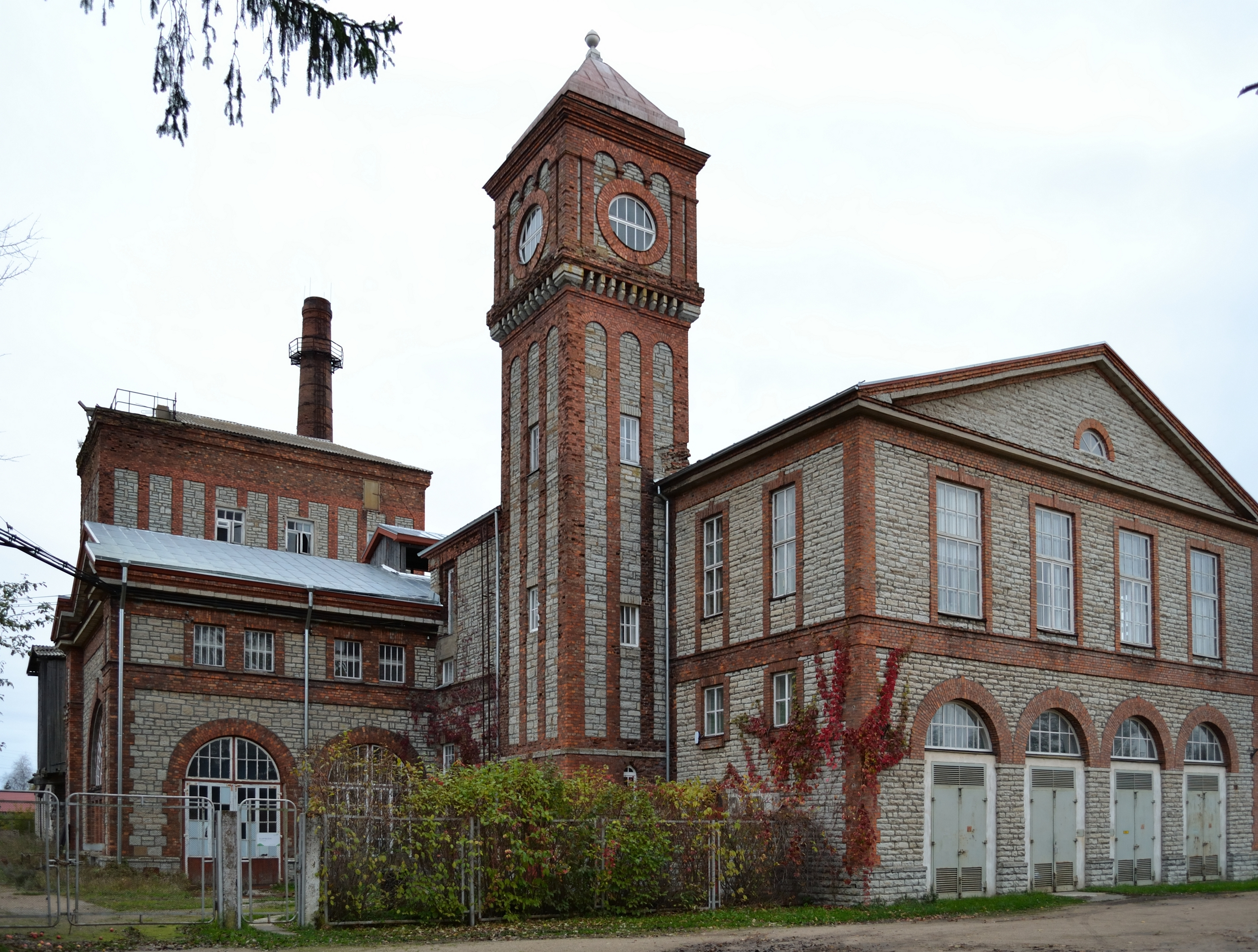
The former Ellamaa thermal power station in Turba

Preceding station	Elron	Following station
Riisipere towards Tallinn	Tallinn–Turba/Paldiski	Terminus
