= Kloogaranna =

Village in Estonia

- Village
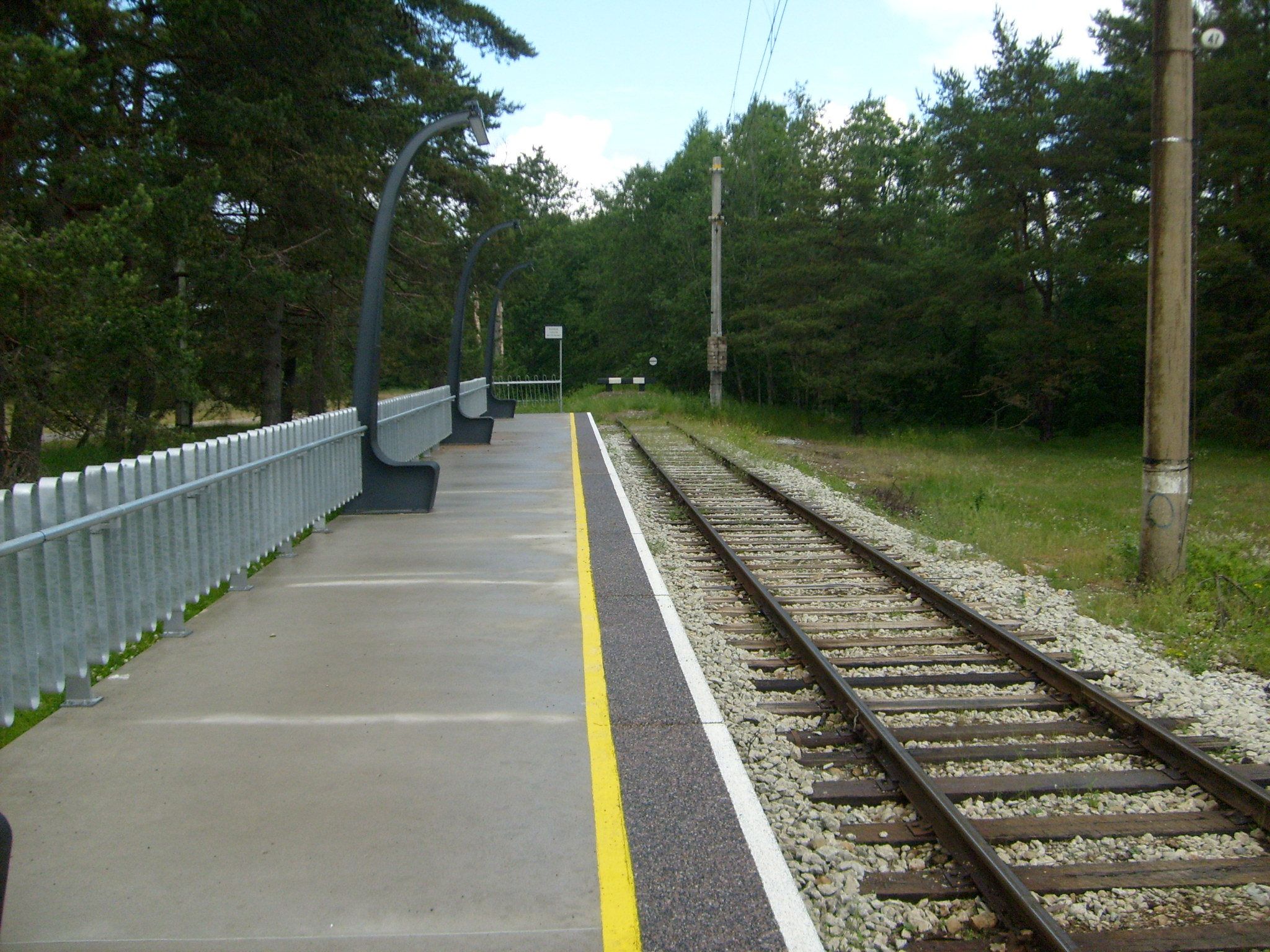
- Klooga-Rand railway station

- Location in Estonia
- Coordinates: 59°21′41.75″N 24°14′49.04″E
- Country: Estonia
- County: Harju County
- Parish: Lääne-Harju Parish

Population (01.01.2004)
  - Total: 121

Kloogaranna is a village in Lääne-Harju Parish, Harju County, Estonia. It has a population of 121 (1 January 2004).

Kloogaranna has a station on the Elron rail line and is served by up to six daily trains from Tallinn main station (Balti jaam).

Kloogaranna has a long sandy beach just by the train station. During the Soviet era it was very popular; now it is less crowded and for many years there were no facilities. Since 2021 there is a small café by the beach and a kiosk which sells ice cream.

== See also ==
- Klooga

Preceding station	Elron	Following station
Klooga towards Tallinn	Tallinn–Turba/Paldiski	Terminus
