= Ants Mellik =

Estonian architect

Ants Mellik (1 June 1926, Tartu – 26 September 2005) was an Estonian architect.

== Early life ==
Ants Mellik graduated from Tallinn Secondary School in 1944 and continued his studies at the Tallinn Polytechnic Institute, graduating in 1950. From 1952–56, he was a post-graduate student at the Institute of Nutrition and, from 1958 to 1968, a research scientist. He worked on the "Estonian Project" in 1956–57 and was a member of the Construction Committee. From 1957 to 1958, he was a member of the Architectural Department of the Executive Committee of the Council of Workers' Deputies of the City of Tallinn. He was also a member of the "EKE Project" from 1968 to 1992.

== Personal ==
Mellik was the son of sculptor Voldemar Mellik and Linda Mellik. He was the brother of architect Tõnu Mellik.

== Career ==
Ants Mellik presented a modern conception wherein architecture evolves from the needs of society, specific circumstances and democratic needs.

Mellik drafted plans for the Tallinn Hiiu quarter and designed the pointbuildings for Ilmarise Street. This residential project was also implemented in Keila and, with some changes, Mustamäe. He also created plans for: Kolga-Aadla, Kiiu-Aadla, Viinistu, Põdrangu, Treimani, and other settlements.

In 1950, the research team of the Science Academy of Building and Building Materials Institute (Note: The members: H. Arman, A. Kotli, A. Mellik, H. Parmas, and L. Volkov.) began building pilot projects for housing, but there were many faults. Their most successful experimental house, built in the early 1960s, was next to the Gonsior 18 Television House. It featured a constructive innovation of borderline-walls with large bridges that allowed for a freer space distribution and favoured apartments that could extend through the house.

Mellik's standard designs for one-family dwellings "Ants" and "Ando" are well known. Since 1977, many have been built. Examples of "Ants" are found in Ääsmäe. The "Ants" project is Estonian-like with a high beam roof, a mansard floor and two doors. Under the same roof are a sauna, garage and small adjoining rooms.

During 1982, many of his plans for the three-storey apartment blocs EKE-10 and two-storeyed blocs were used.

Together with Ü. Kuper, Mellik designed single-family houses in Spitak, Armenia for earthquake victims. They also worked on 18-apartment panel housing and, in 1991, a children's home. From 1990, Mellik began to design farmhouses and household buildings.

== Awards ==
In 1958, Ants and brother Tõnu Mellik received the I-II prize in the planning contest.

In the same year, he received the II prize at the "EKE Project" single-family project competition.
