= Jaan Tiidemann =

Estonian architect

- Born: 21 August 1971 (age 55); Tallinn, Estonia
- Education: Estonian Academy of Arts (1997)
- Occupation: Architect
- Projects: Tallinn Golf Club (1998); Veskimöldre kindergarten (2003)

Jaan Tiidemann (born 21 August 1971, in Tallinn) is an Estonian architect.

Jaan Tiidemann studied in the Estonian Academy of Arts in the department of architecture. He graduated from the academy in 1997.

From 1996 to 1999 Jaan Tiidemann worked in the Mai Shein Architectural Bureau. From 1999 he works in the Jaan Tiidemann Architectural Bureau.

Some of the most notable works by Jaan Tiidemann include the Golf Club of Tallinn in Niitvälja and the Veskimöldre kindergarten. Tiidemann was one of the nominees of the 2008 Best Young Architect award and is a member of the Union of Estonian Architects.

== Works ==
- Tallinn Golf Club in Niitvälja, 1998 (with Mai Shein)
- Interior design of the Teder&Rask Law Office, 1999
- Interior of the Cersco offices, 2001 (with Kadri Tamme)
- Wine shop in the Old Town of Tallinn, 2001 (with Kadri Tamme)
- Single-family home in Kakumäe, 2002
- Summer home in Pedaspea, 2003
- Kindergarten in Veskimöldre, 2003 (with Andres Lember)
- Summer home in Pedaspea, 2004
- Reconstruction of the office building on Sakala Street, 2007–2009
