= Valingu railway station =

Railway station in Harju County, Estonia

Valingu
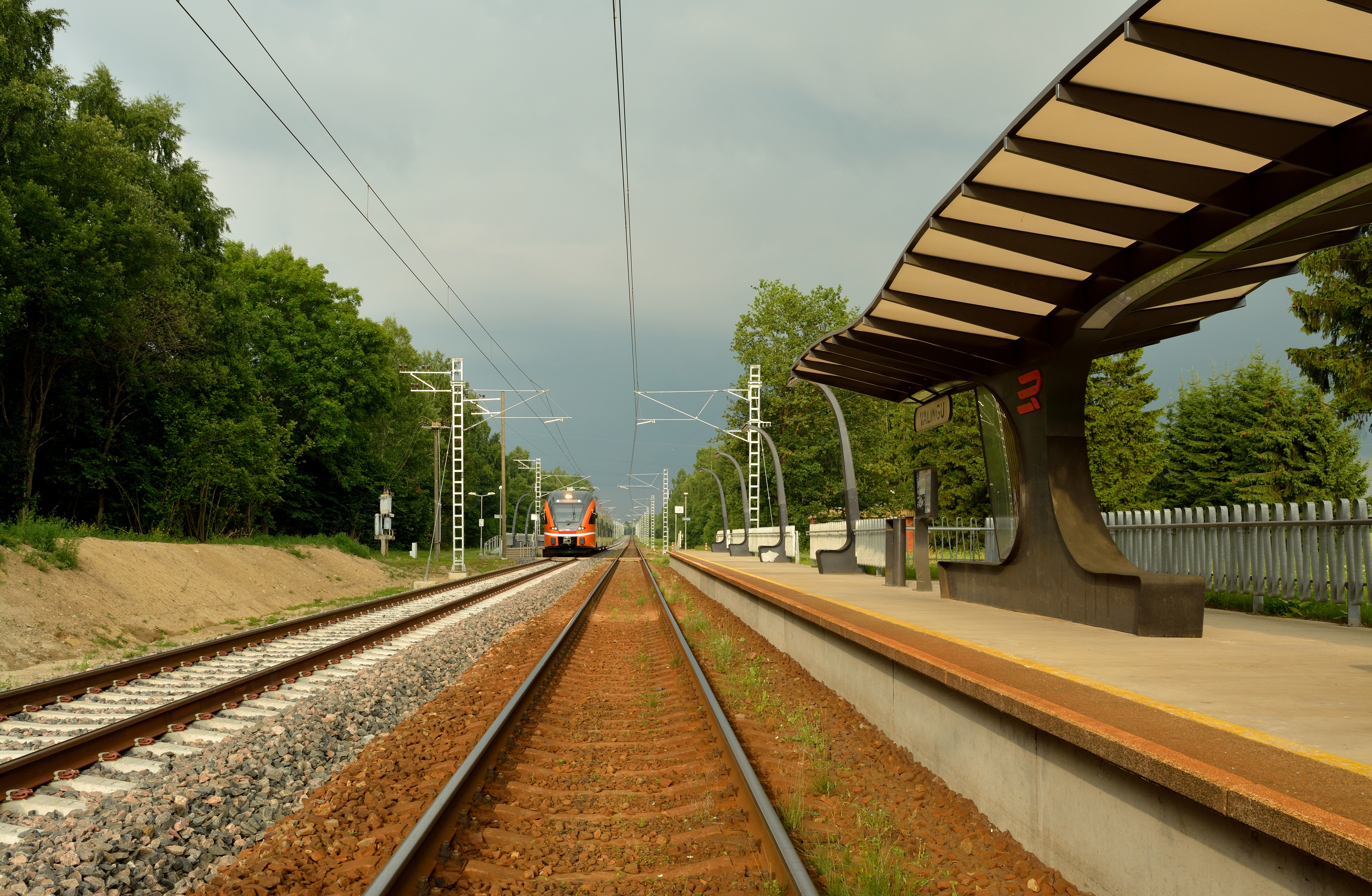
- Valingu railway station in 2013

General information
- Location: Valingu, Saue Parish, Harju County; Estonia
- Coordinates: 59.311389°N 24.484167°E
- System: railway station
- Owner: Eesti Raudtee (EVR)
- Platforms: 2
- Tracks: 2
- Train operators: Elron

Construction
- Structure type: at-grade
- Accessible: Yes

Other information
- Fare zone: II

History
- Opened: 1928; 98 years ago
- Electrified: 1924

Services
Preceding station	Elron	Following station
Saue towards Tallinn	Tallinn–Turba/Paldiski	Keila towards Turba, Kloogaranna or Paldiski
Location

Valingu railway station (Estonian: Valingu raudteepeatus) is a railway station serving the village of Saue in Saue Parish in Harju County in northern Estonia.

Valingu railway station is located on the Tallinn–Keila railway line, between Saue and Keila railway stations and approximately 23 km (14 mi) southwest from the Baltic station (Estonian: Balti jaam) which is the main railway station of Tallinn. The station opened in 1928 as an intermediate station on the Tallinn–Paldiski railway line which was completed in 1870. Currently, the station is served by Tallinn's commuter rail network, an electrified commuter rail network operated by Elron, linking the city of Tallinn with its suburbs and the surrounding countryside.

== See also ==
- List of railway stations in Estonia
- Rail transport in Estonia
