= Valingu =

Village in Estonia

- Village
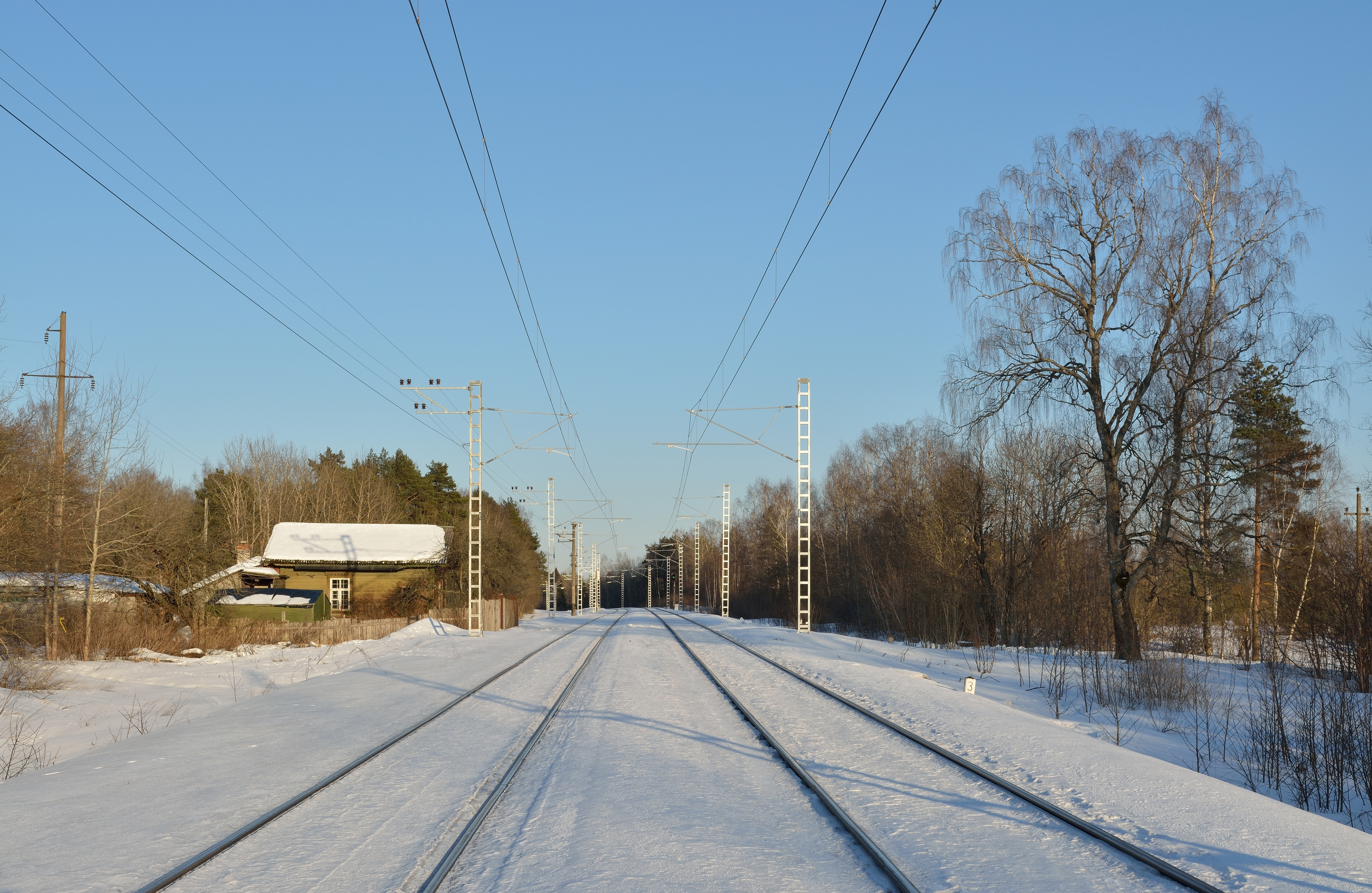
- The Tallinn–Keila railway line in Valingu

- Location in Estonia
- Coordinates: 59°18′10″N 24°28′16″E
- Country: Estonia
- County: Harju County
- Municipality: Saue Parish

Population (2011 Census)
  - Total: 299

Valingu is a village in Saue Parish, Harju County in northern Estonia. It is located by the Tallinn–Keila railway between Saue (5 km northeast) and Keila (3 km west). Valingu is served by Valingu railway station on the Elron western route. As of the 2011 census, the village's population was 299.

Valingu Manor (Walling) was established in the 1640s. The classicist one-storey stone main building from the beginning of the 19th century has not survived.
