= Johannes Herm =

Estonian military personnel

- Born: January 14, 1893; Kiiu-Aabla, Kolga Parish, Harju County, Estonia
- Died: January 1, 1926 (aged 32) Saue, Estonia
- Allegiance: Estonia
- Branch: Estonian Navy
- Service years: 1915–1925
- Rank: Captain
- Conflicts: World War I; Estonian War of Independence; Kunda landing operation; Utria landing
- Awards: Cross of Liberty (VR I/2, VR II/3) Order of St. George (4th class)

Johannes Herm (14 January 1893 – 1 January 1926) was an Estonian naval officer who served as the commander of the Estonian Navy from 1919 to 1925. He played an important role in the Estonian War of Independence, leading important amphibious operations and contributing to the development of Estonia's naval forces.

== Early life and education ==
Herm was born on 14 January 1893 in Kiiu-Aabla, then part of the Governorate of Estonia in the Russian Empire. In 1914, he completed his studies at a maritime school in Käsmu and in 1915 graduated from a maritime school in Narva. The same year, he passed the naval officer exams in Kronstadt as an external candidate.

== Military career ==
=== Service in World War I ===
From 1 May 1915 to 15 July 1918, Herm served in the Imperial Russian Navy. He participated in battles against Bulgarian forces on the Romanian front from January to December 1917, commanding a battalion. In January 1917, he successfully repelled a Bulgarian attack and destroyed an enemy unit, earning the Order of St. George (4th class). By the time he left the Russian Navy, he held the rank of lieutenant.

=== Estonian War of Independence ===
With the outbreak of the Estonian War of Independence, Herm was appointed commander of the landing unit on the gunboat Lembit. He participated in multiple amphibious operations between December 1918 and January 1919.

On 11 January 1919, after the wounding of Captain Karl Aleksander Paulus, Herm took command of the Kunda landing operation. He led a 300-man force that successfully repelled enemy Red Army troops. A week later, during the Utria landing on 18 January, he was appointed commandant of the liberated town of Narva-Jõesuu and took part in the Narva.

On 1 February 1919, Herm was appointed Commander of the Coastal Defense, Communications, and Rescue Stations. Later that year, on 28 November, he was promoted to Commander of the Estonian Navy. For his contributions to the war effort, he was awarded the Cross of Liberty (VR I/2 and VR II/3) and was granted land in Saue.

== Commander of the Estonian Navy ==
Herm served as the Commander of the Estonian Navy from 28 November 1919 to 1 March 1925. In 1920, he was promoted to Second-Class Captain, and in 1923 to Captain.

During his tenure, he restructured the navy for peacetime operations, improved coastal fortifications, and secured the acquisition of the mine cruisers Lennuk and Vambola. He also initiated training programs for Estonian naval officers in the United Kingdom. Alongside Hermann Salza, he submitted proposals to the Ministry of War on necessary reforms in the navy, prioritizing the procurement of submarines.

== Later life and death ==
Herm suffered from tuberculosis, which progressively worsened. By 1924, he was unable to fulfill his duties effectively and frequently sought medical treatment. In March 1925, he was placed in the naval reserve, and Hermann Salza succeeded him as Commander of the Estonian Navy.

Johannes Herm died on 1 January 1926 at his home in Saue. He was buried at Rahumäe Cemetery in Tallinn.
