= Tõnu Mellik =

Estonian architect

Tõnu Mellik (12 May 1934 Tartu – 3 June 1993 Tallinn) was an award-winning Estonian architect active in the mid-twentieth century.

== Early life ==
Tõnu Mellik graduated from Tallinn Secondary School in 1952. He went on to study film direction at the Moscow State All-Union Institute of Cinematography. In 1953 he went on to study at the State Art Institute of the Estonian SSR (ERKI) and ultimately graduated in 1959. After graduation he worked in Tallinn from 1959 to 1962 and became a member of the Union of Architects in 1960. From 1964 to 1968 he worked as a senior engineer and junior researcher at the Institute of Building and Building Materials. Thereafter, he worked as an architect for the "Estonian Land Reconstruction Project" until 1975. From 1975 to 1987, he was a senior lecturer at ERKI. In 1981, he was the chief architect of the private company, "Esmar".

== Family ==
Mellik was the son of sculptor Voldemar Mellik and Linda Mellik, and brother of architect Ants Mellik.

== Creations ==
Tõnu Mellik designed industrial, commercial, and residential buildings. He assisted in the development of the towns of Kiili, Kohila, Kuusalu, Loksa, Taebla, Viru-Jaagupi, Haabneeme, and Padise.

Mellik participated in developing the Tallinn General Plan and in the reconstruction of the city center in 1968. Arguably the most impressive building he worked on is the Otepää ski base, built in 1978.

Soviet-era architects like Tõnu Mellik were, by convention, simple practitioners. Soviet strictures did not permit architects to freely create their own works by exercising their own vision.

More Tõnu Mellik Buildings:

- Männiku experimental base of the Estonian Academy of Sciences (1962)
- The "Volta" factory technical building (1965)
- "Ühistare" cooperative house (1966)
- Keila-Joal Sanatorium Boarding School training building (1976)
- Three-story twelve-apartment terraced apartment building (1979)
- Tamsalu Culture House (1980)
- Viimsi office building (1991)

== Awards won ==
- In 1958 Ants and Tõnu Mellik won the first and second prizes for the Mustamäe residential area plan.
- In 1971 Mellik won first prize for the Saha-Loo area plan and buildings.
- In 1972, together with Peep Jänse, he won the first and second prizes for the opera and ballet theatre at Tõnismägi in Tallinn.
- In 1976 he won first prize for the Pajusi Collective Farm.
- In 1977, working with Peep Jänse, he won first prize for Elva's Retirement Home.
- In 1978 he won the first prize for Tartu Designers' House.
