= Räägi =

Village in Estonia

Coordinates: 58°27′39″N 22°44′07″E

- Village
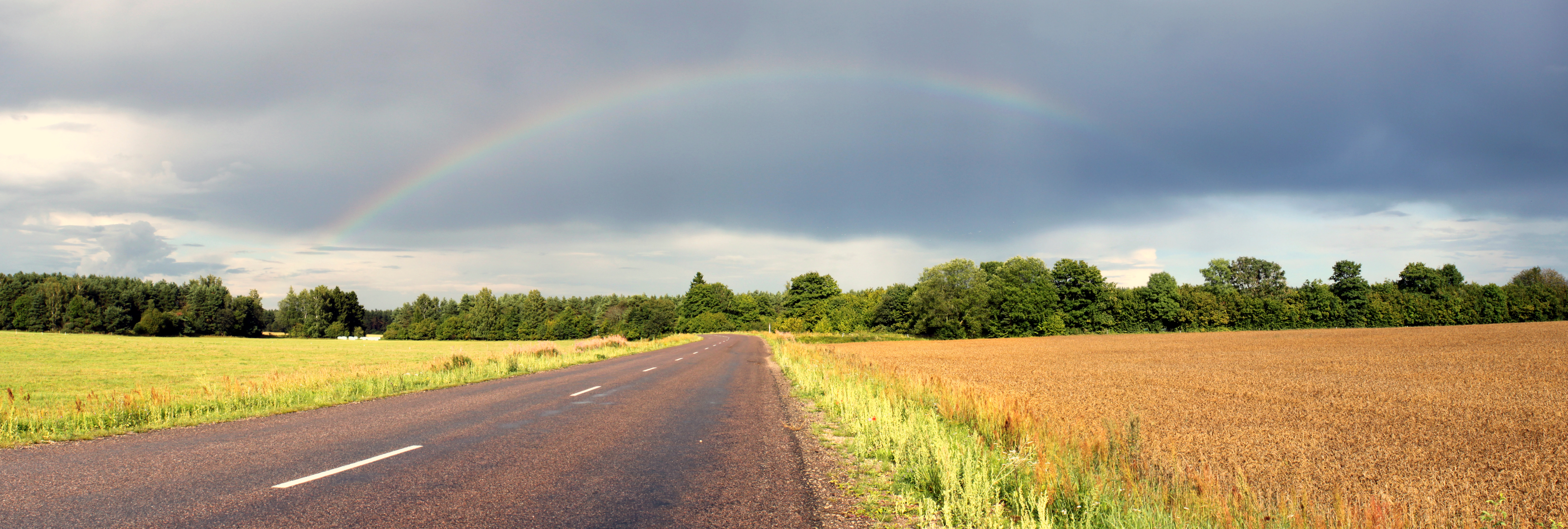
- Road in Räägi village
- Interactive map of Räägi
- Country: Estonia
- County: Saare County
- Parish: Saaremaa Parish
- Time zone: UTC+2 (EET)
  - Summer (DST): UTC+3 (EEST)

Räägi is a village in Saaremaa Parish, Saare County in western Estonia.

Before the administrative reform in 2017, the village was in Leisi Parish.

Architect Mai Šein (born 1946) was born in Räägi village.
