= Saue railway station =

Railway station in Harju County, Estonia

Saue
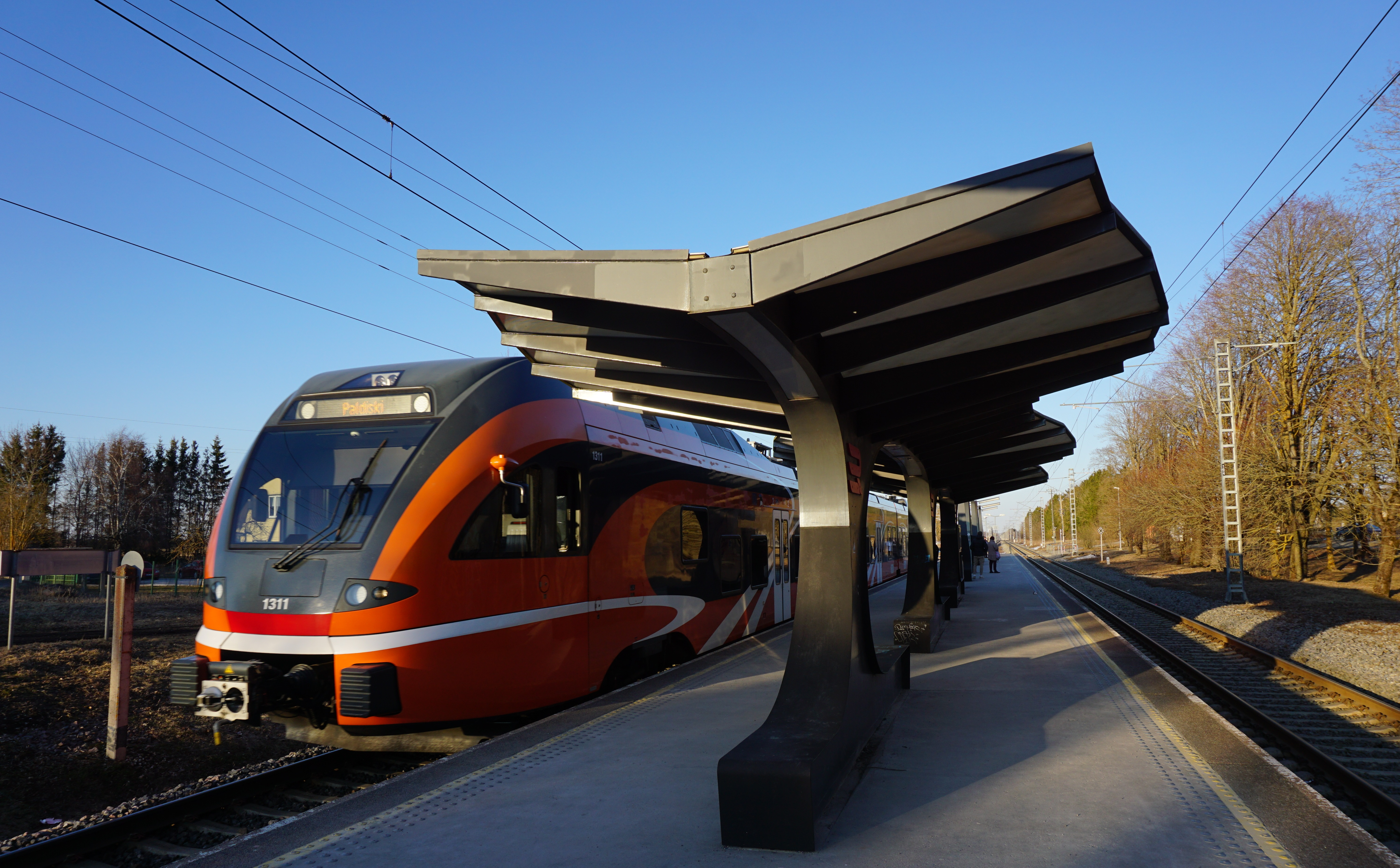
- Saue railway station in 2022

General information
- Location: Saue, Saue Parish, Harju County; Estonia
- Coordinates: 59.324914°N 24.548006°E
- System: railway station
- Owner: Eesti Raudtee (EVR)
- Platforms: 1
- Tracks: 2
- Train operators: Elron
- Connections: Regional Buses S1 S2 S4 S5 S6 S7 S9 S10 S11 112 191 192 199

Construction
- Accessible: yes

Other information
- Fare zone: II

History
- Opened: 1872; 154 years ago
- Electrified: 1924

Services
Preceding station	Elron	Following station
Padula towards Tallinn	Tallinn–Turba/Paldiski	Valingu towards Turba, Kloogaranna or Paldiski
Location

Saue railway station (Estonian: Saue raudteepeatus) is a railway station serving the town of Saue in Saue Parish in Harju County in northern Estonia.

Saue railway station is located on the Tallinn-Keila railway line, between Padula and Valingu railway stations and approximately 19 km (12 mi) southwest from the Baltic station (Estonian: Balti jaam) which is the main railway station of Tallinn. The station opened in 1872 as an intermediate station on the Saint Petersburg–Tallinn–Paldiski railway line which was completed in 1870. Currently, the station is served by Tallinn's commuter rail network, an electrified commuter rail network operated by Elron, linking the city of Tallinn with its suburbs and the surrounding countryside.

== See also ==
- List of railway stations in Estonia
- Rail transport in Estonia
