= Mai Šein =

Estonian architect

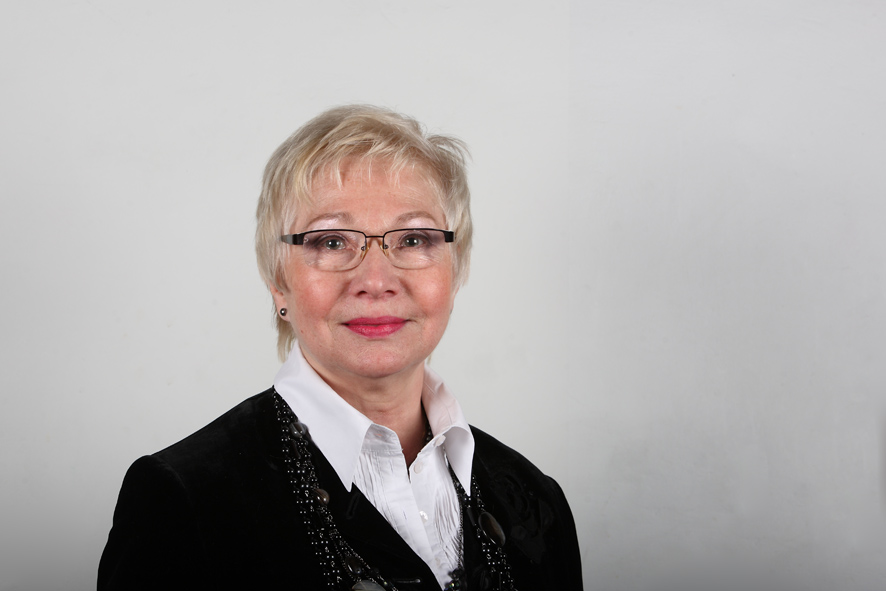
- Mai Šein in 2011.
- Born: 10 May 1946 (age 80); Räägi, Saaremaa, Estonia
- Education: National Art Institute of the Estonian SSR
- Occupation: Architect
- Practice: Tsentrosojuz Projekt; Mai Šein OÜ

Mai Šein (born 10 May 1946 in Räägi, Saaremaa) is an Estonian architect.

Mai Šein studied in the National Art Institute of the Estonian SSR (today's Estonian Academy of Arts) in the department of architecture. She graduated from the institute in 1970.

From 1970 to 1990, Mai Šein worked in the Tallinn office of the soviet design bureau Tsentrosojuz Projekt. Currently Mai Šein works in the architectural bureau Mai Šein OÜ.

Notable works by Mai Šein are the Golf Club of Tallinn in Niitvälja, the building of the Energetics department of the Tallinn Technical University, apartment building on Koidula Street and the terrace housing on the Sõpruse road. Mai Šein is a member of the Union of Estonian Architects.

== Works ==
- Tallinn Golf Club in Niitvälja, 1998 (with Jaan Tiidemann)
- Koidula border guard station
- Energetics Department of the Tallinn Technical University, 2004 (with Andrus Padu)
- Apartment building on Koidula Street (with Andrus Padu)
- Terrace housing on Sõpruse Road (with Andrus Padu)
- Saekoja eco-hotel in Otepää
