= Voldemar Mellik =

Estonian sculptor

Voldemar Mellik (until 1938 Melnik; 11 May 1887 Purtse – 24 November 1949 Tallinn) was an Estonian sculptor.

In 1911 he finished his studies at Saint Petersburg Art and Industry Academy. After graduating he attended several art schools in Saint Petersburg. In 1918 he returned to Estonia, settling in Tartu. from 1920 until 1935, he taught (with pauses) at Pallas Art School.

He was the father of architects Tõnu and Ants Mellik.

== Gallery ==
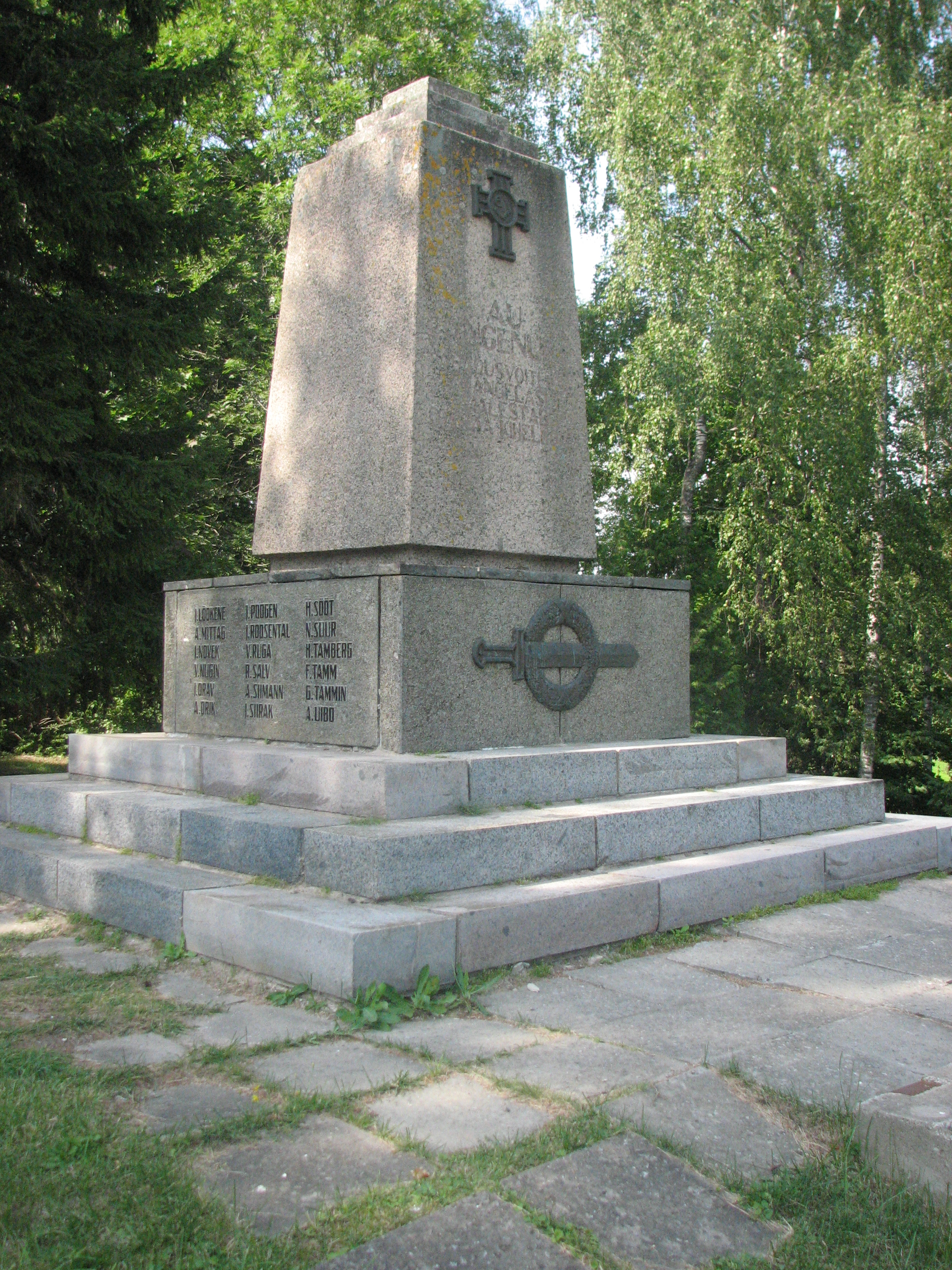
Estonian: Otepää Vabadussõja mälestussammas

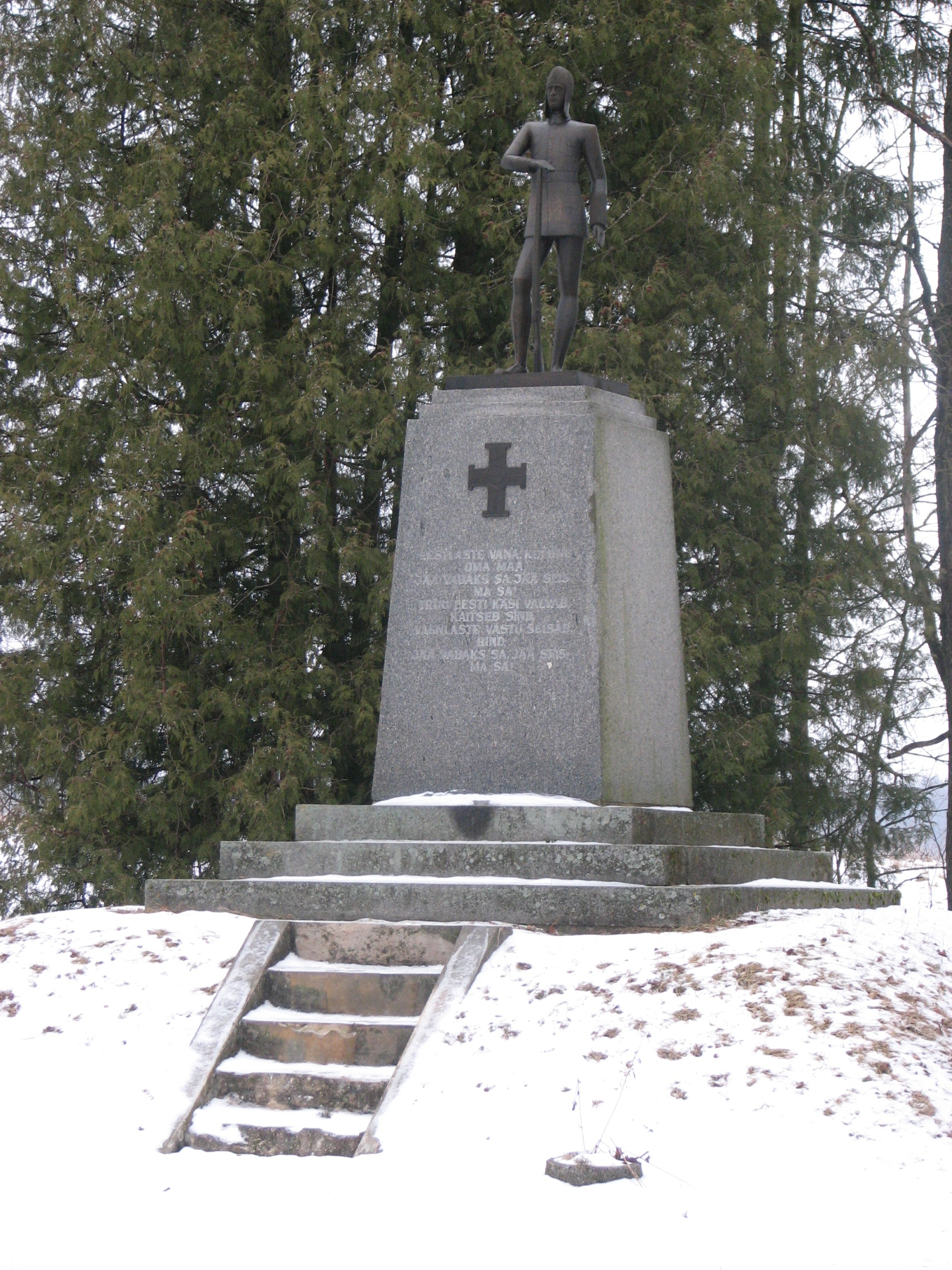
Estonian: Kursi Vabadussõja mälestussammas

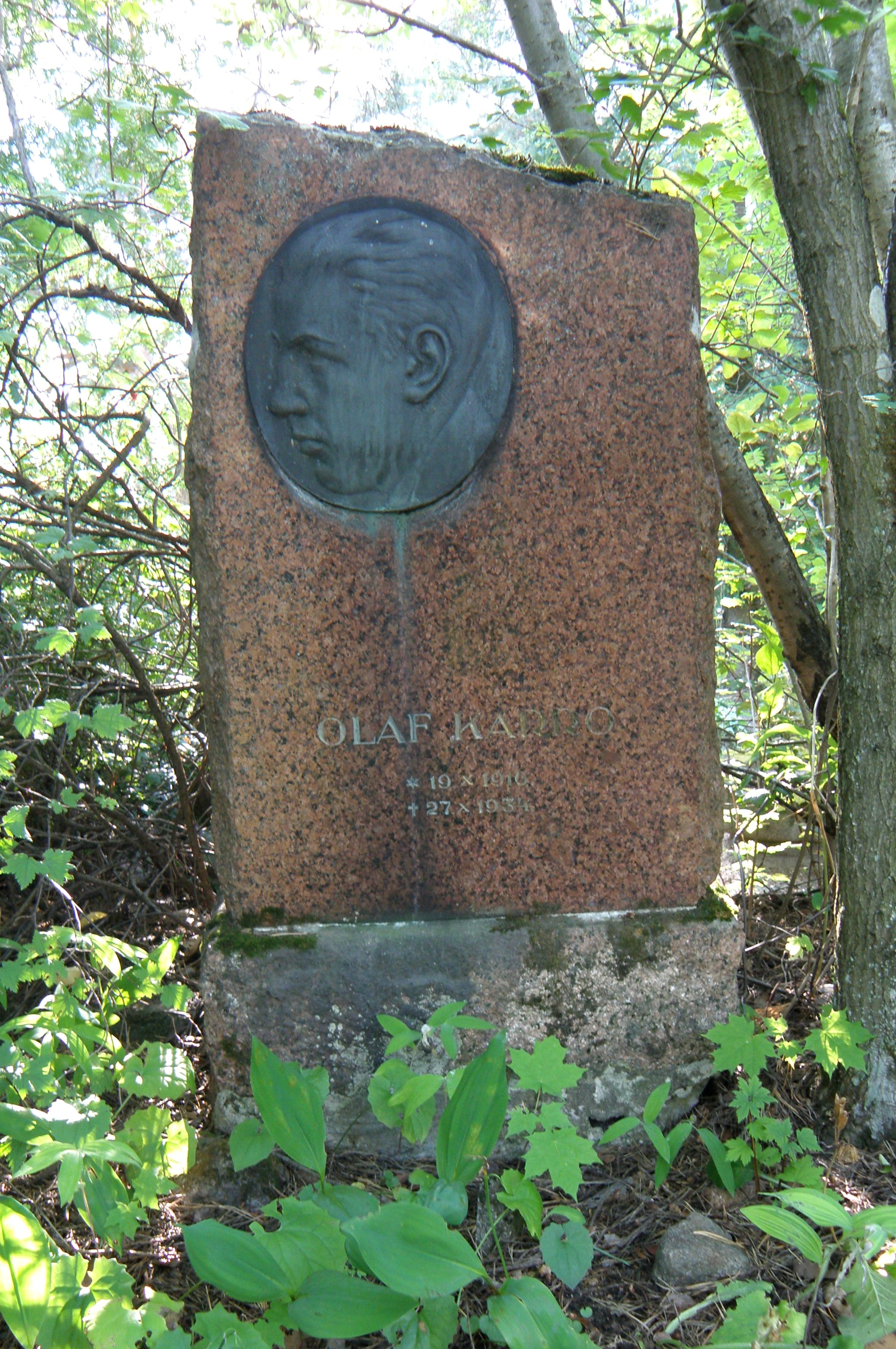
Olaf Karro's grave at Hiiu-Rahu Cemetery

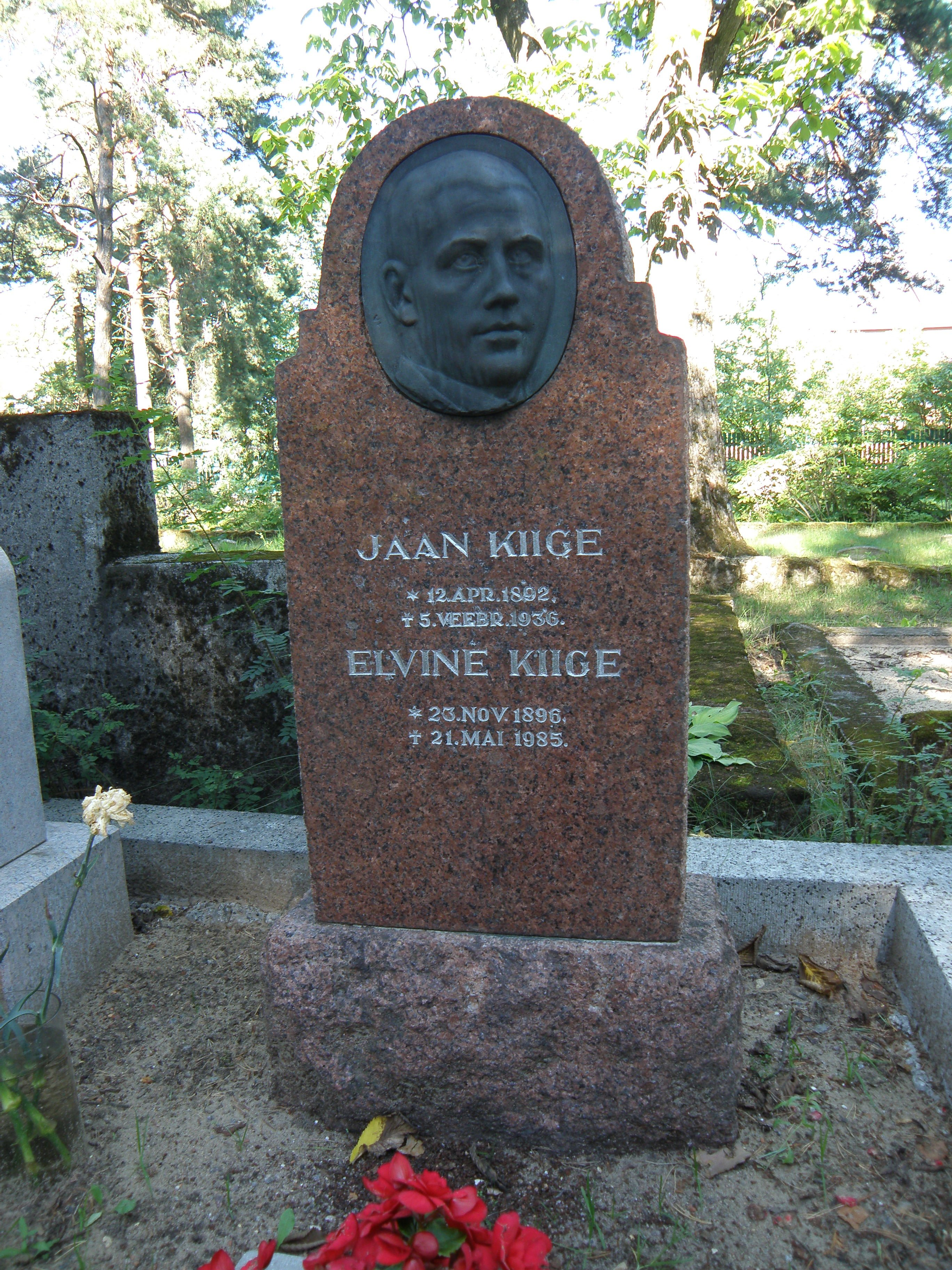
Jaan Kiik's grave at Hiiu-Rahu Cemetery
