= Kolga-Aabla =

Village in Estonia

Coordinates: 59°34′04″N 25°31′44″E

- Village
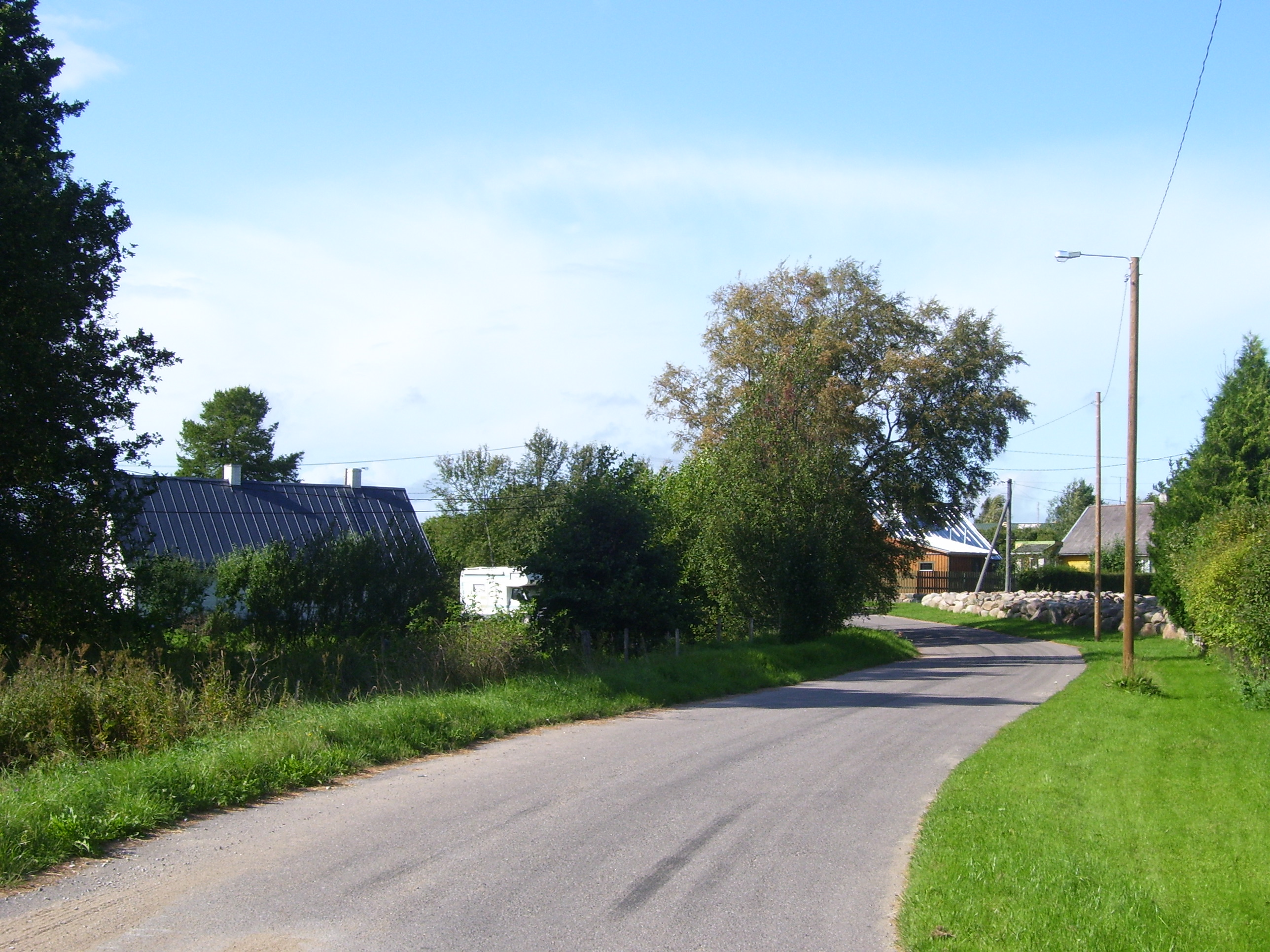
- The village road
- Interactive map of Kolga-Aabla
- Country: Estonia
- County: Harju County
- Parish: Kuusalu Parish
- Time zone: UTC+2 (EET)
  - Summer (DST): UTC+3 (EEST)

Kolga-Aabla is a village in Kuusalu Parish, Harju County in northern Estonia, on the territory of Lahemaa National Park. It is located on the Juminda Peninsula.

== Gallery ==
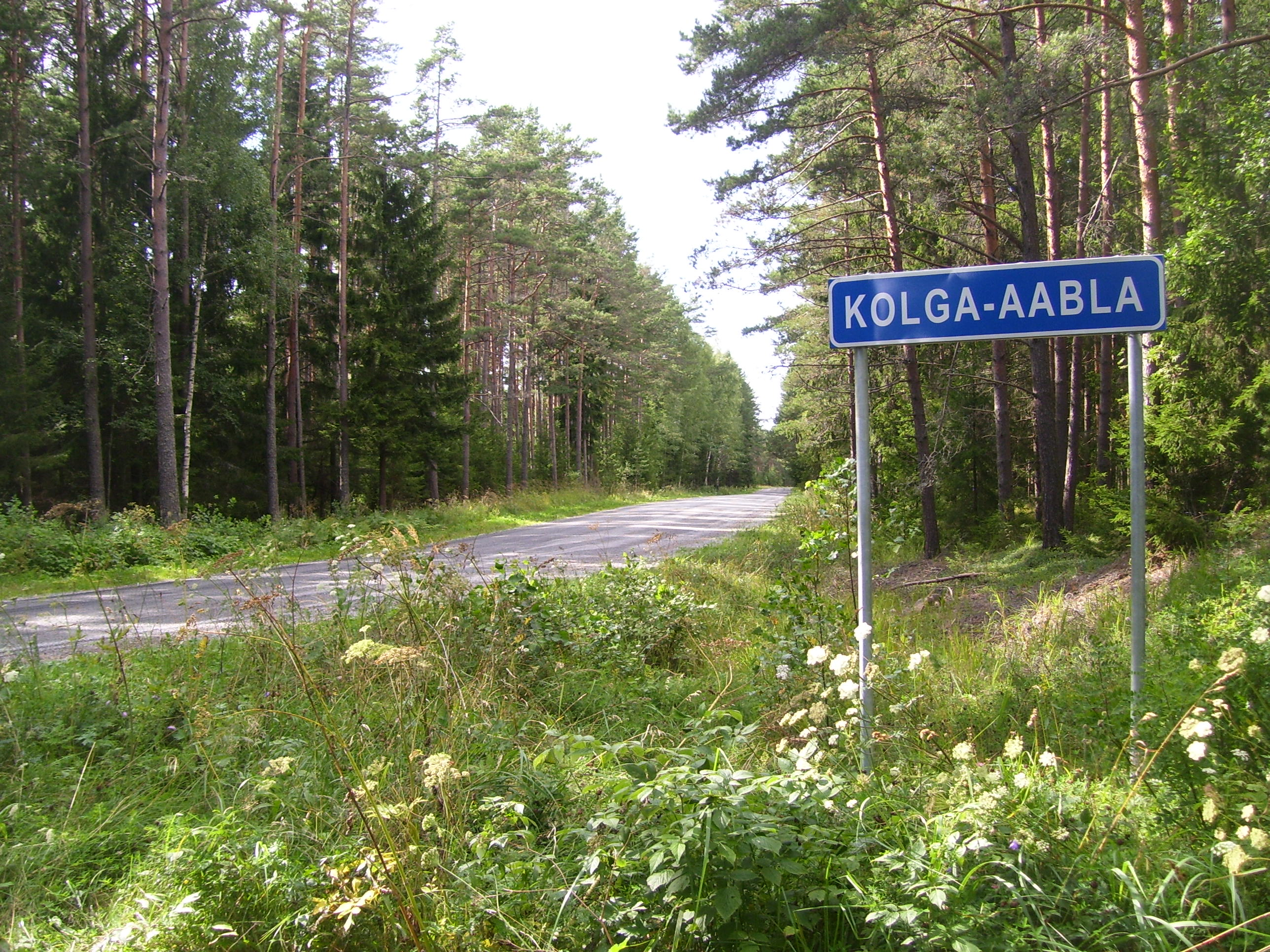
Entrance to Kolga-Aabla from Pedaspea side.

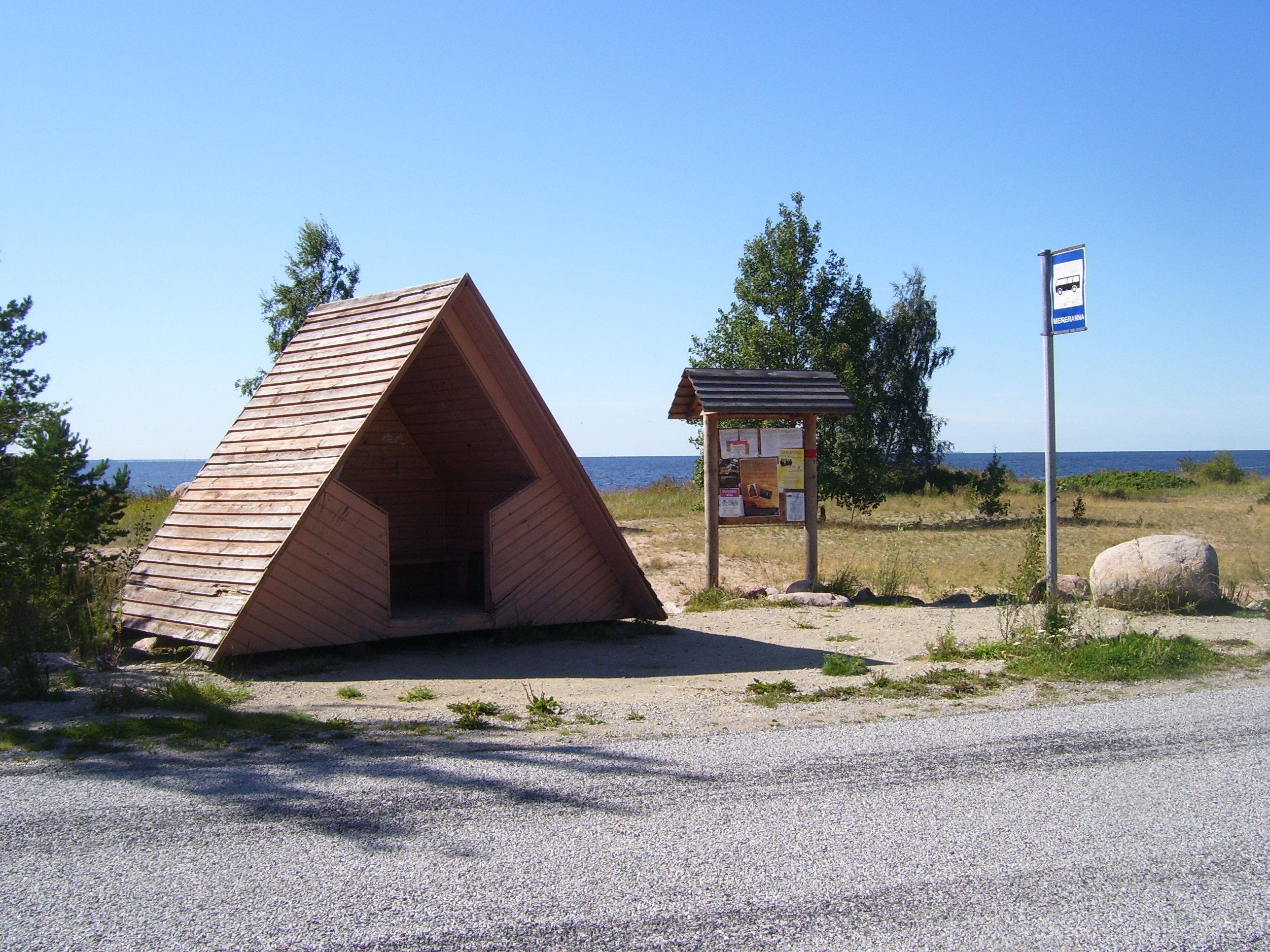
Bus stop in Kolga-Aabla

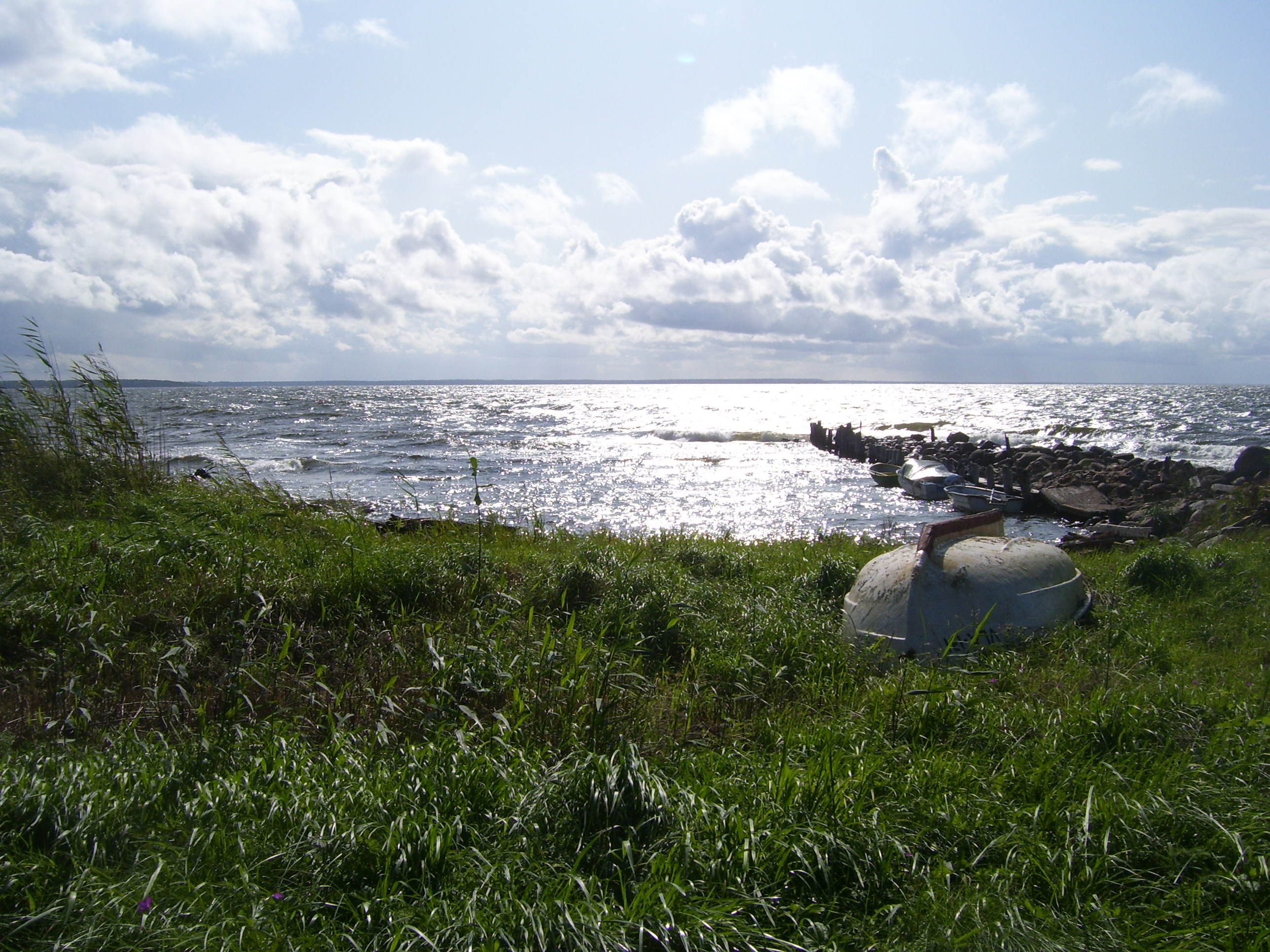
Old harbour

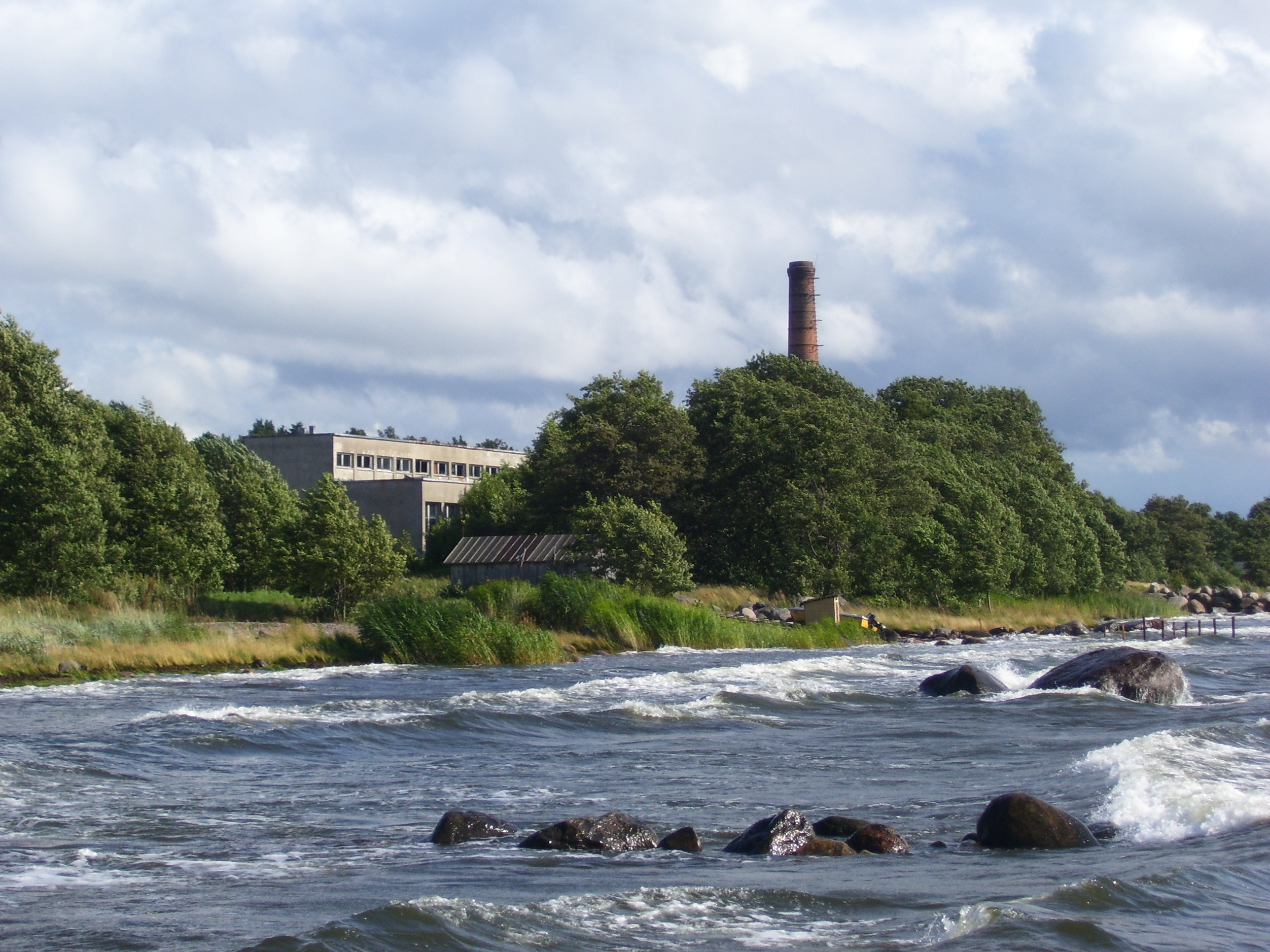
Former factory
