= Treimani =

Village in Estonia

- Village
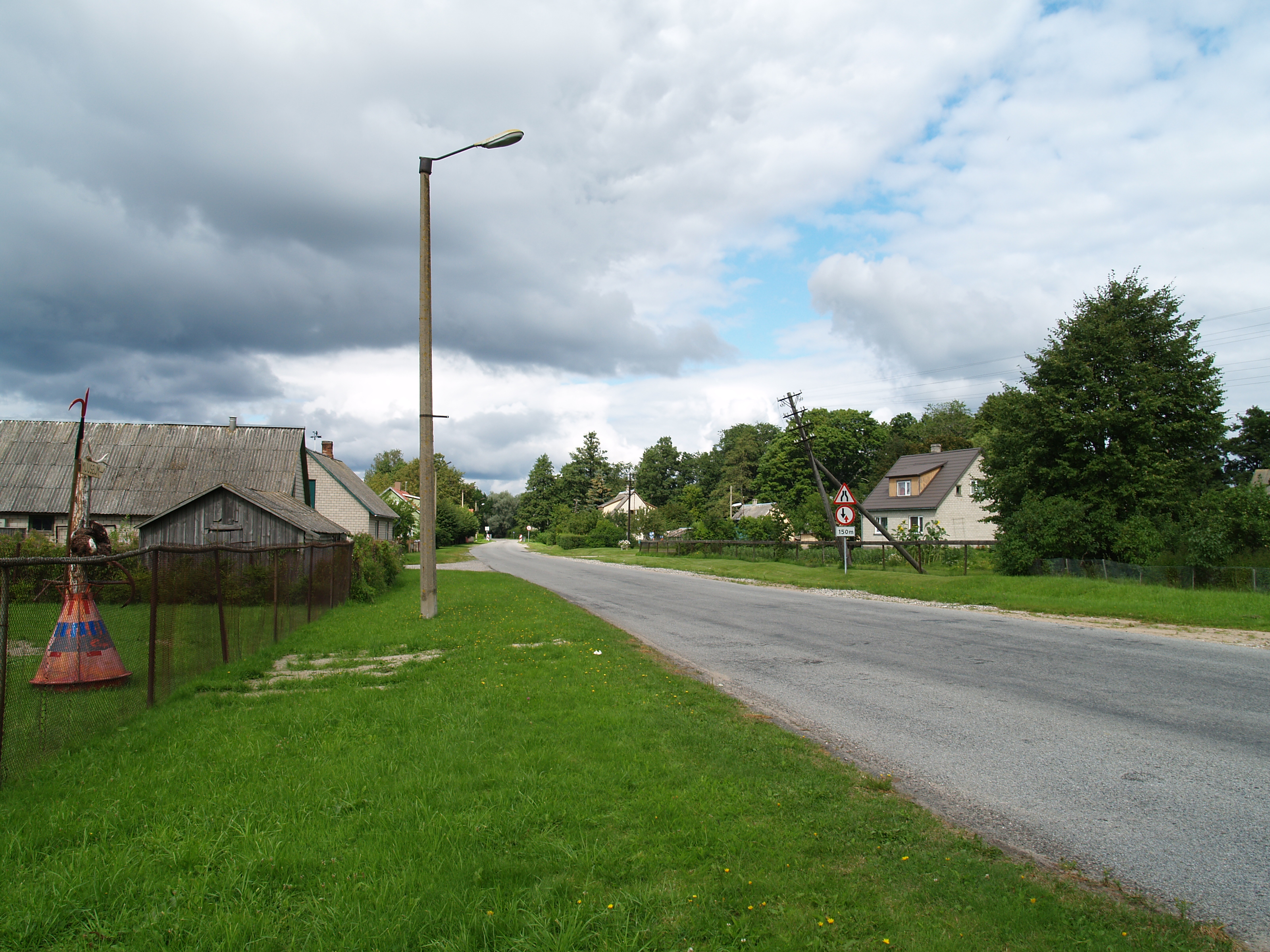
- Treimani
- Interactive map of Treimani
- Coordinates: 57.9236064°N 24.3942678°E
- Country: Estonia
- County: Pärnu County
- Parish: Häädemeeste Parish
- Time zone: UTC+2 (EET)
  - Summer (DST): UTC+3 (EEST)

Treimani is a village in Häädemeeste Parish, Pärnu County in southwestern Estonia.

In 1601, there was a single farm above the village, belonging to the village of Kabli. In 1797, it was named Dreimannsdorff, from which the current name of the village derives.

Treimani has a public house, a harbor and two churches.

== Gallery ==
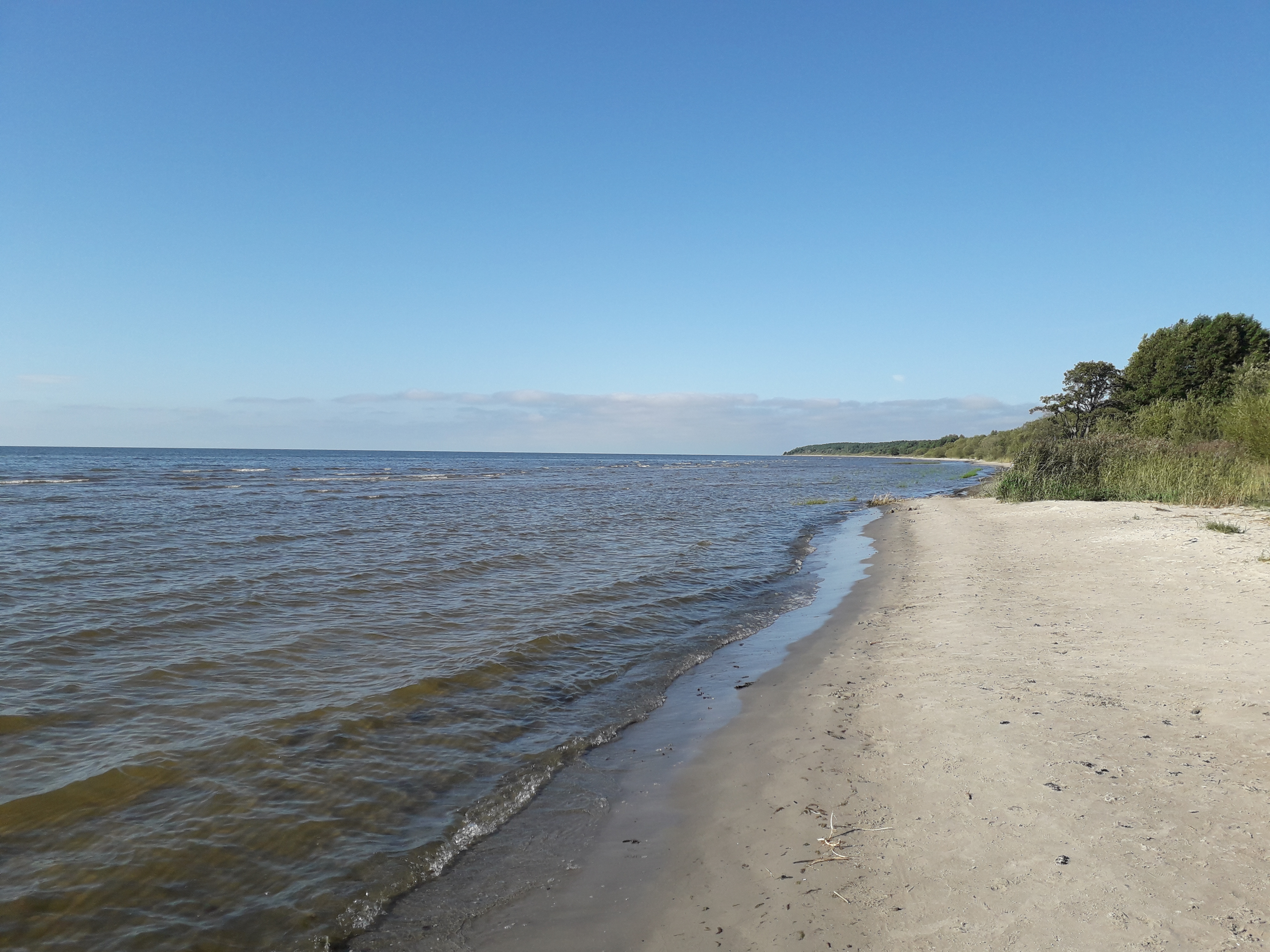
The beach of the Gulf of Riga in Treimani

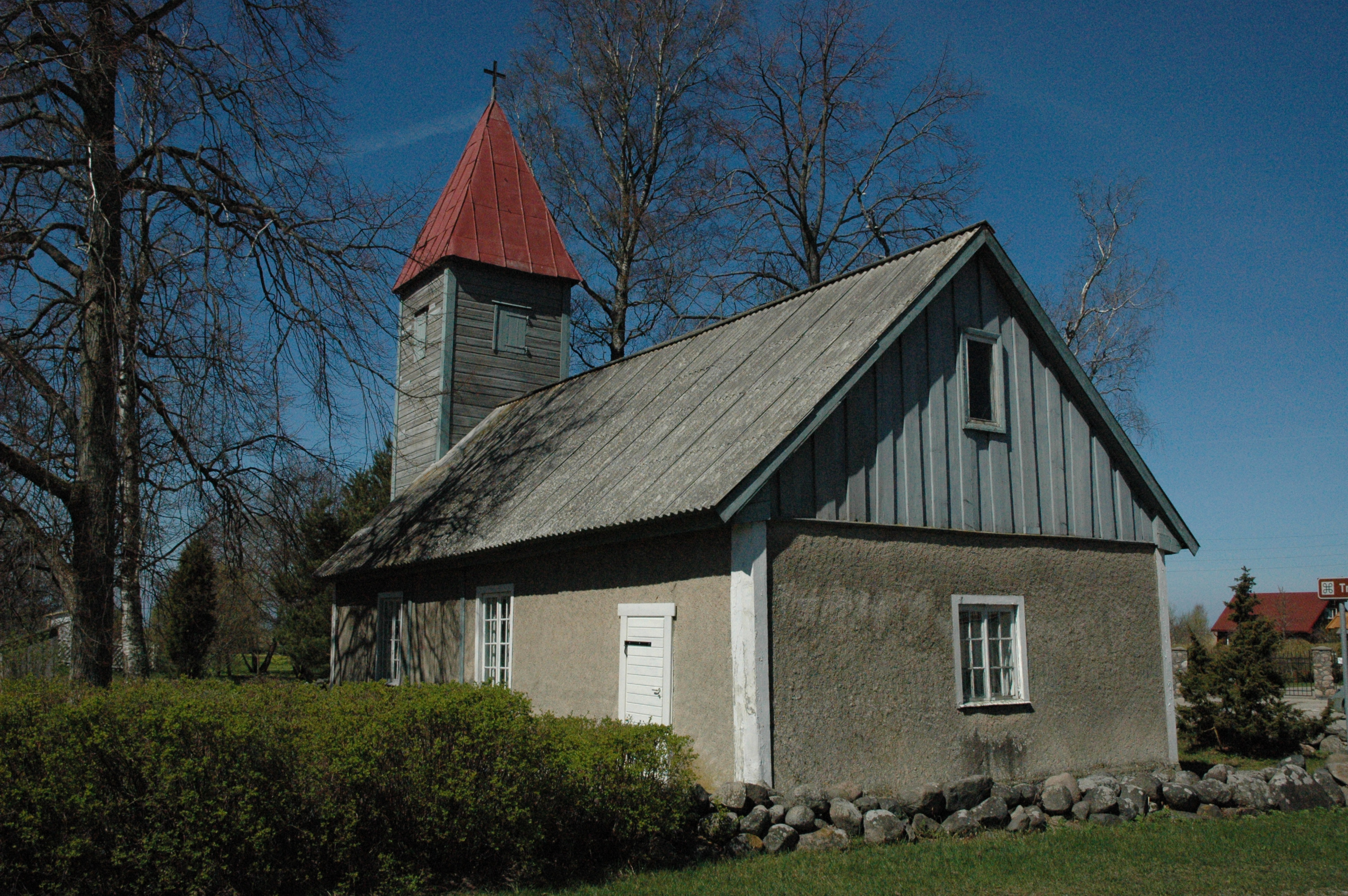
Treimani Lutheran Church

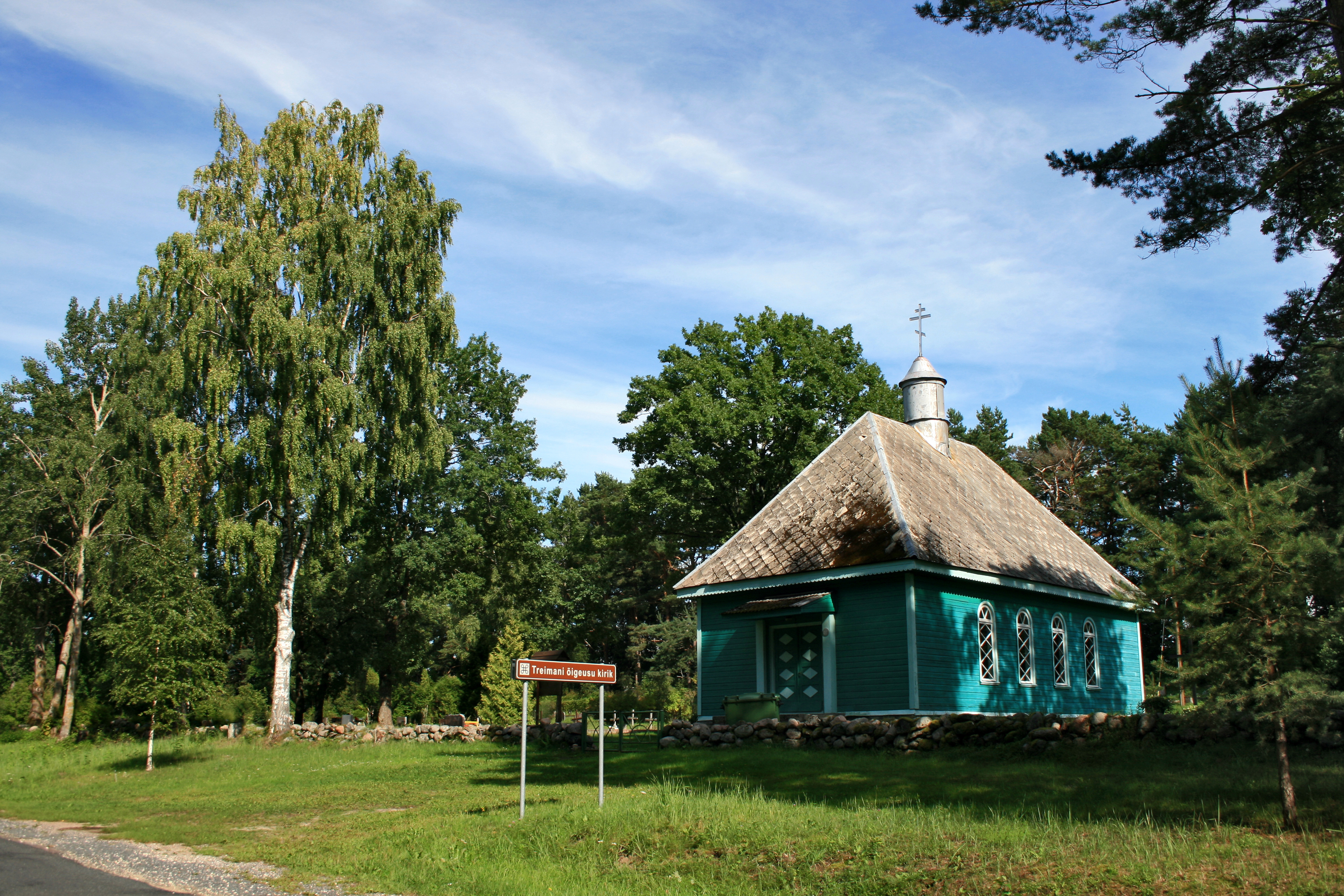
Treimani Orthodox Church

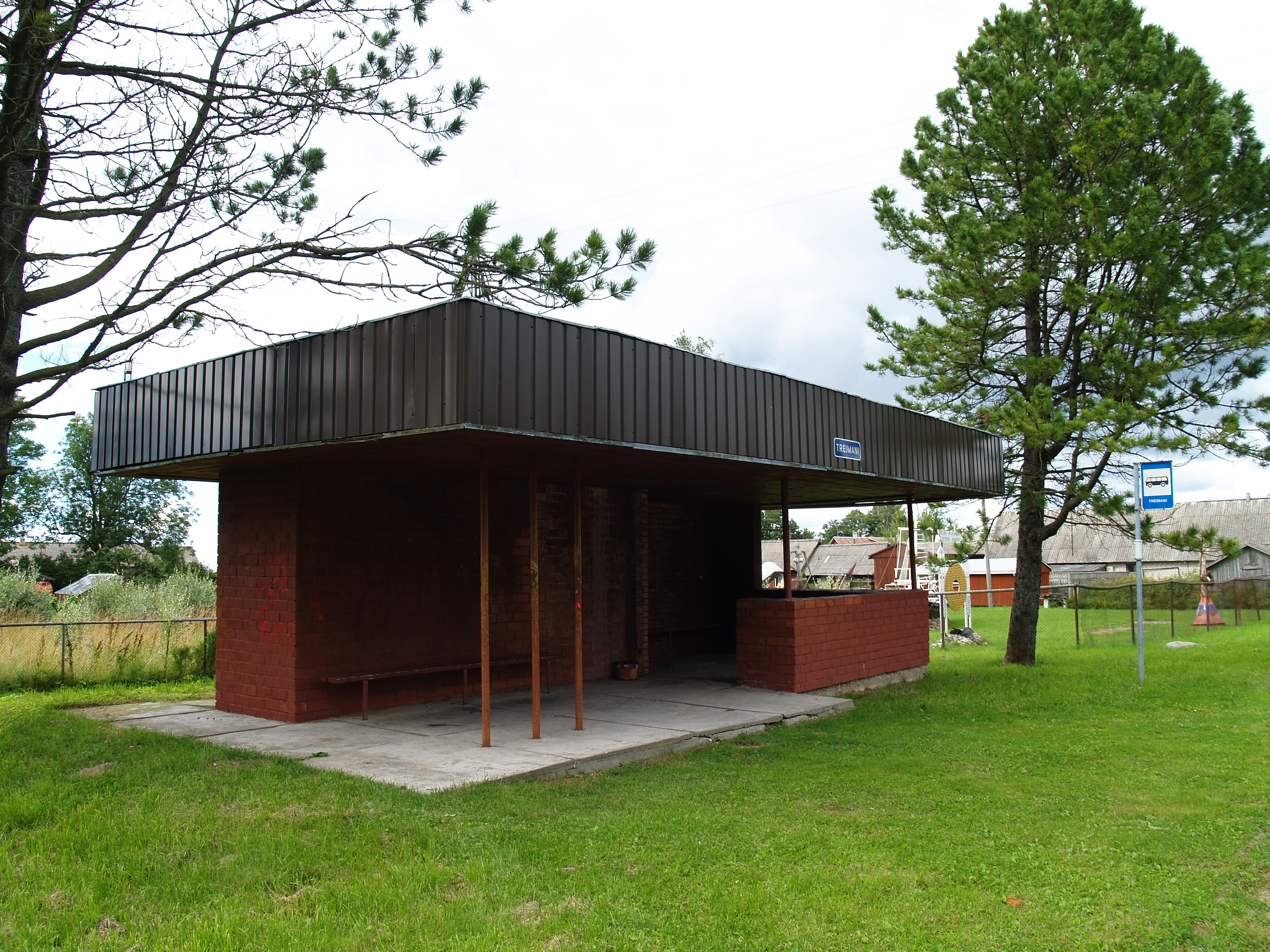
Bus stop

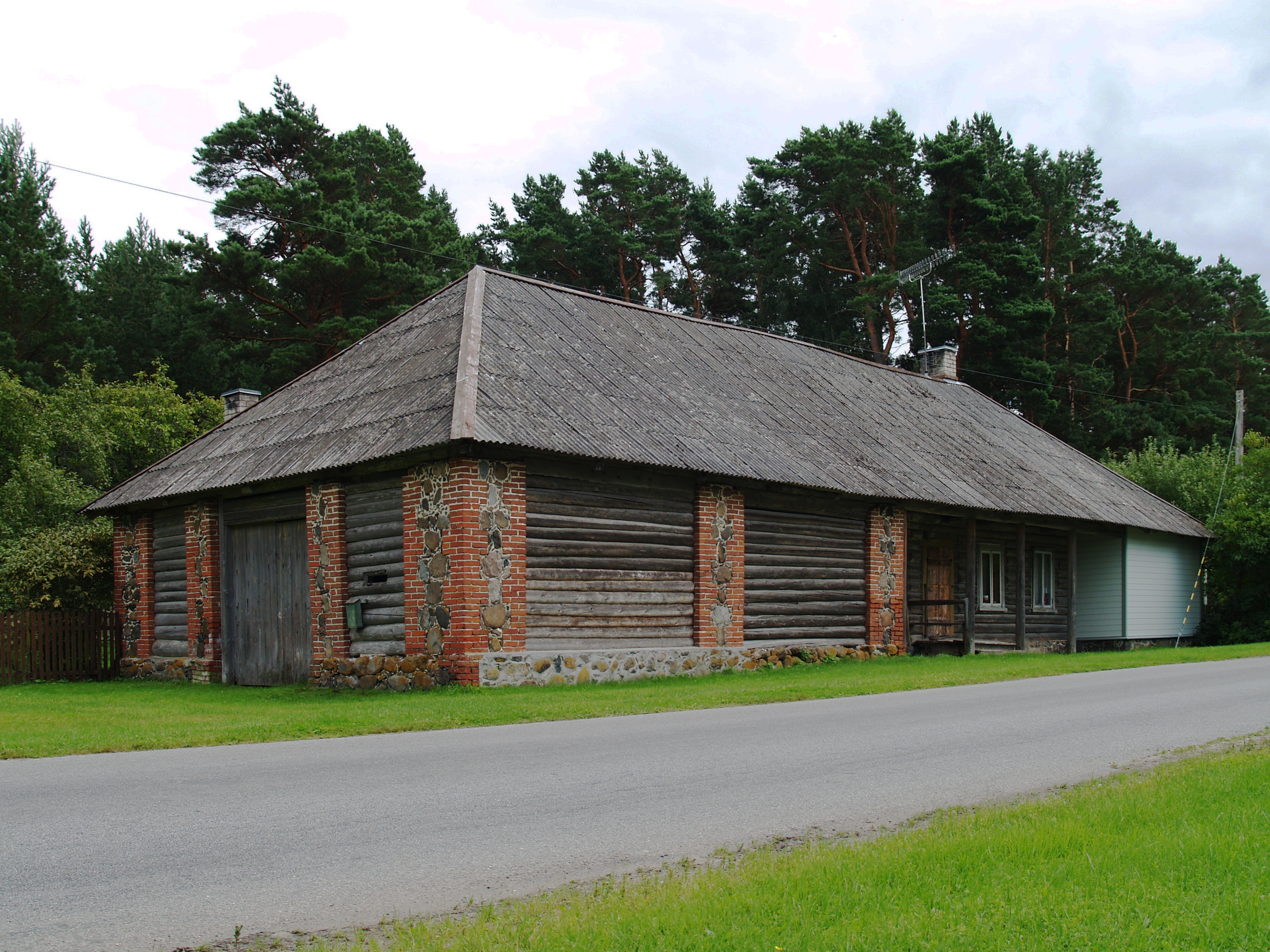
Former postal station and tavern
