= Kiiu-Aabla =

Village in Estonia

Coordinates: 59°35′N 25°31′E

- Village
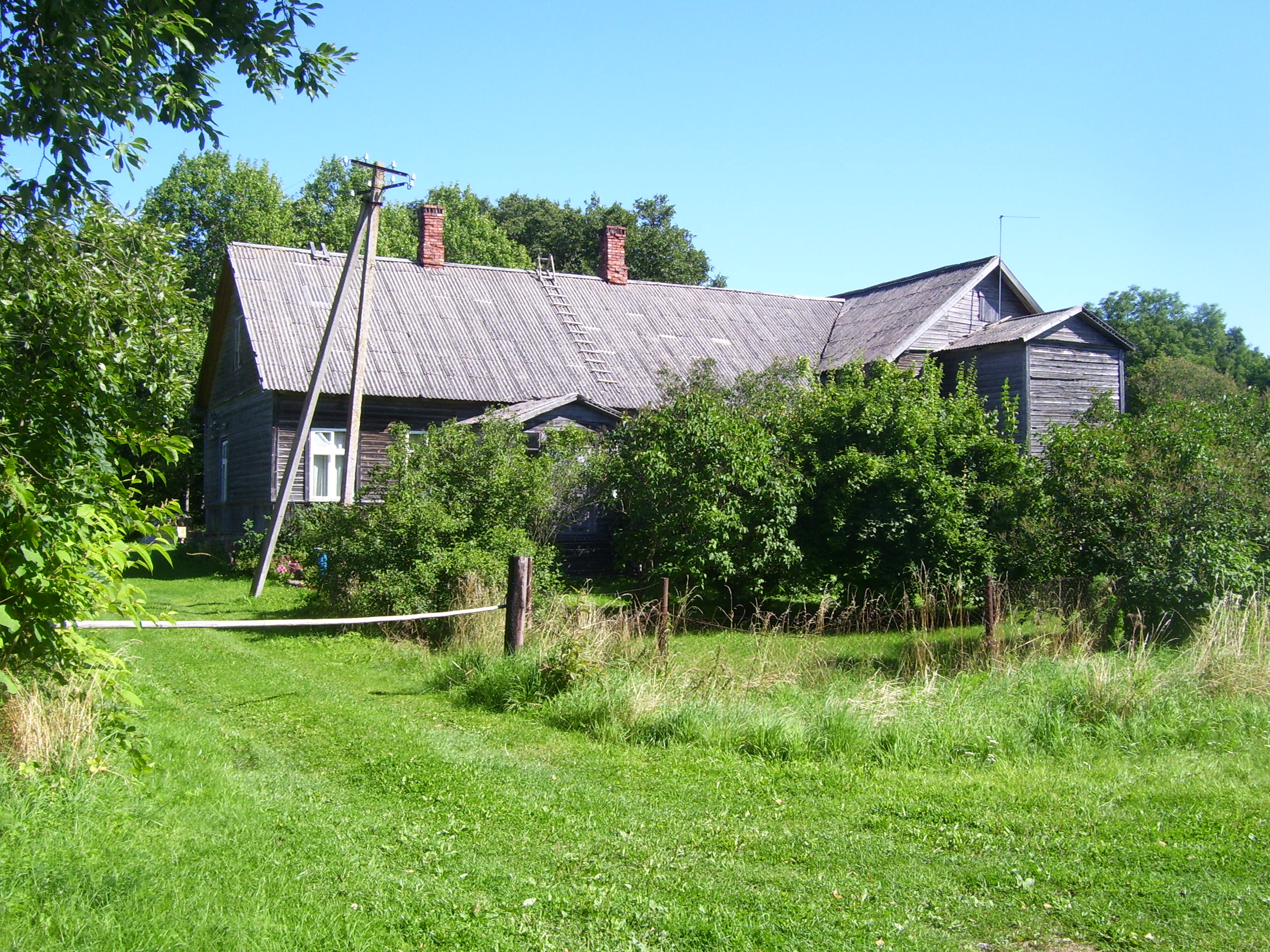
- Interactive map of Kiiu-Aabla
- Country: Estonia
- County: Harju
- Parish: Kuusalu
- Time zone: UTC+2 (EET)
  - Summer (DST): UTC+3 (EEST)

Kiiu-Aabla is a village in Kuusalu Parish, Harju County in northern Estonia, on the territory of Lahemaa National Park. It is located on the Juminda Peninsula.

== Notable people ==
- Johannes Herm, commander of the Estonian Navy in 1919-1925, was born here in 1893.
