= Pedaspea =

Village in Estonia

Coordinates: 59°33′N 25°34′E

- Village
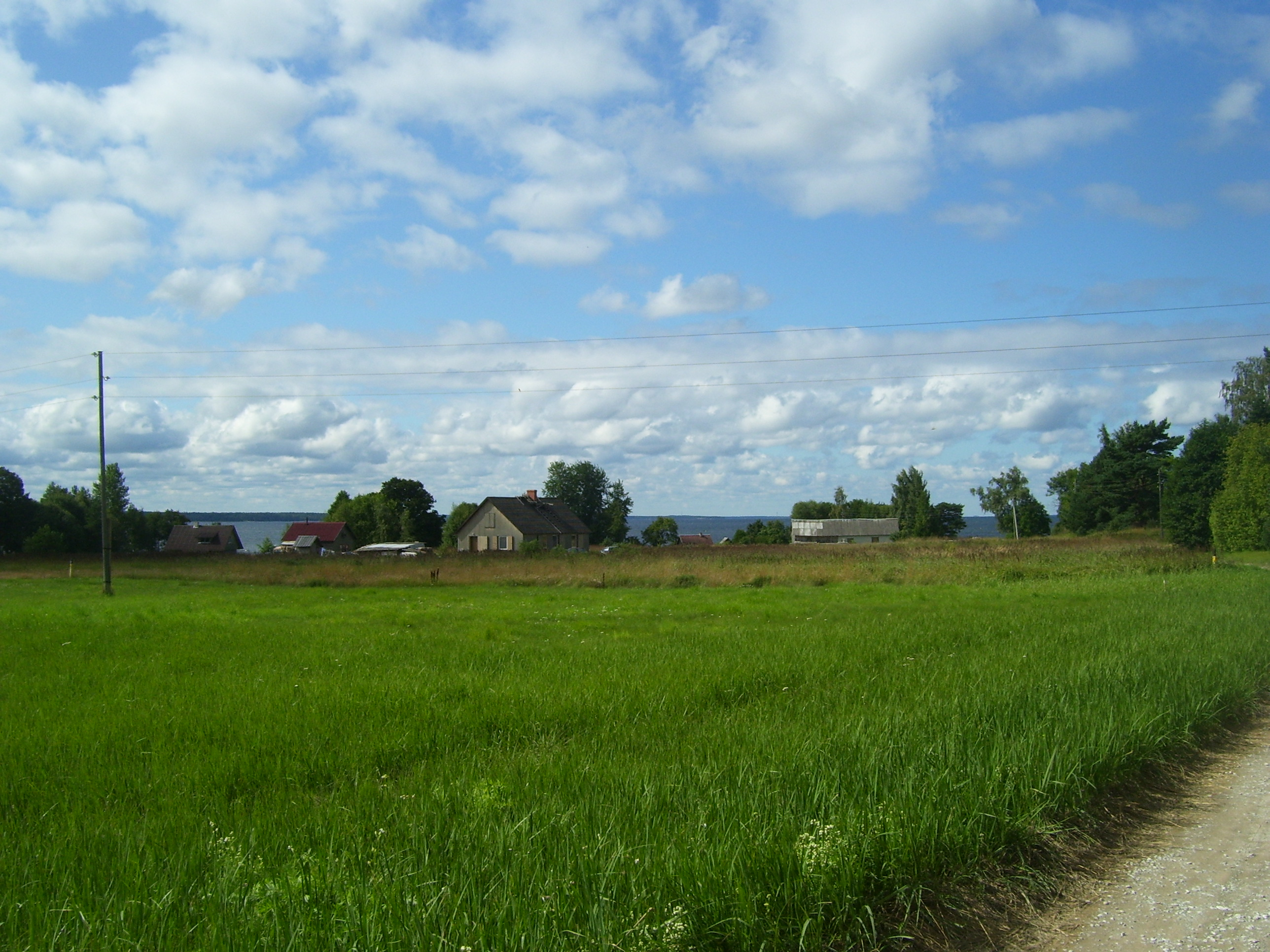
- Interactive map of Pedaspea
- Country: Estonia
- County: Harju County
- Parish: Kuusalu Parish
- Time zone: UTC+2 (EET)
  - Summer (DST): UTC+3 (EEST)

Pedaspea is a village in Kuusalu Parish, Harju County in northern Estonia, on the territory of Lahemaa National Park. It is located on the Juminda Peninsula.

== Gallery ==
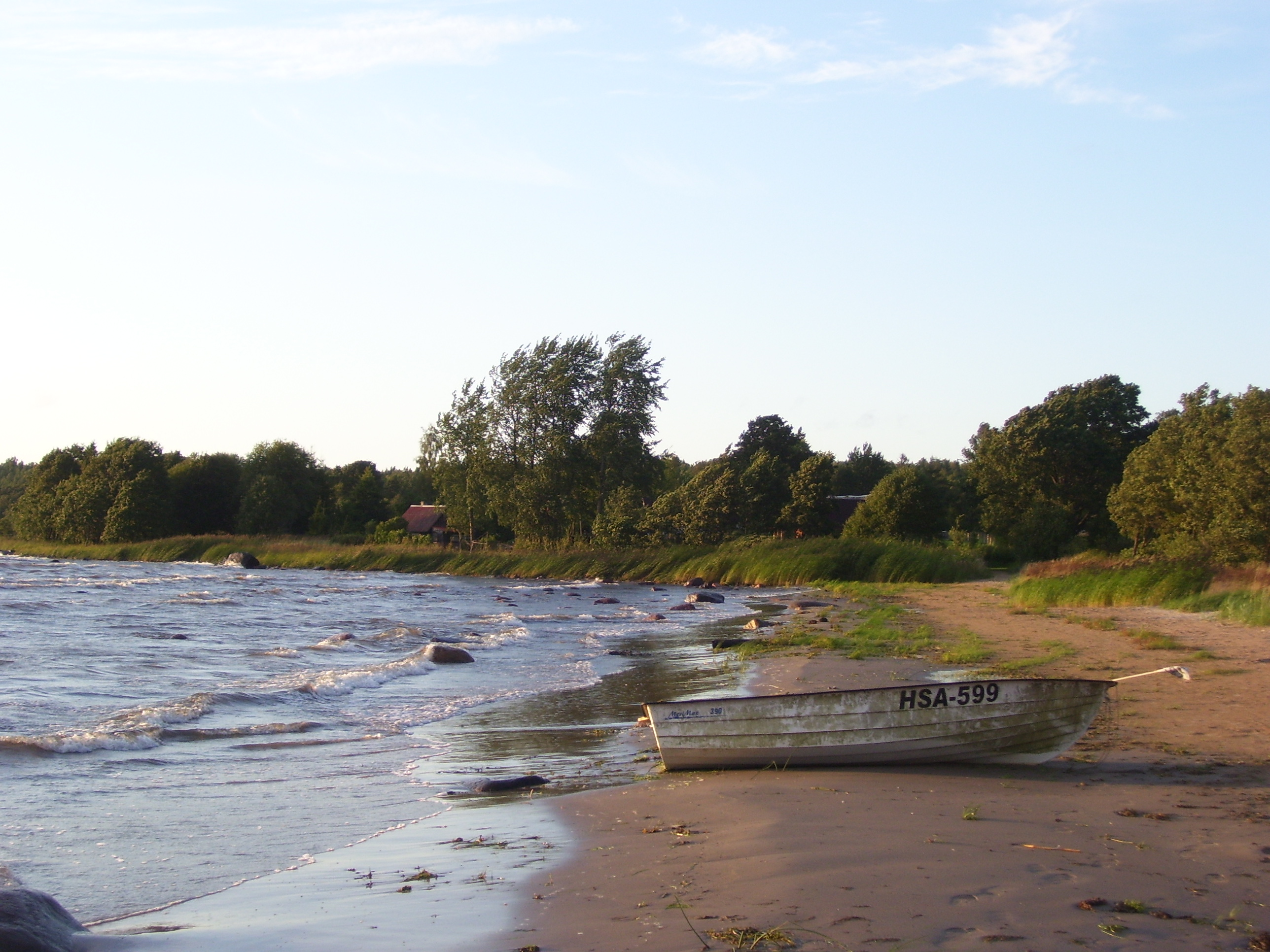
Pedaspea beach

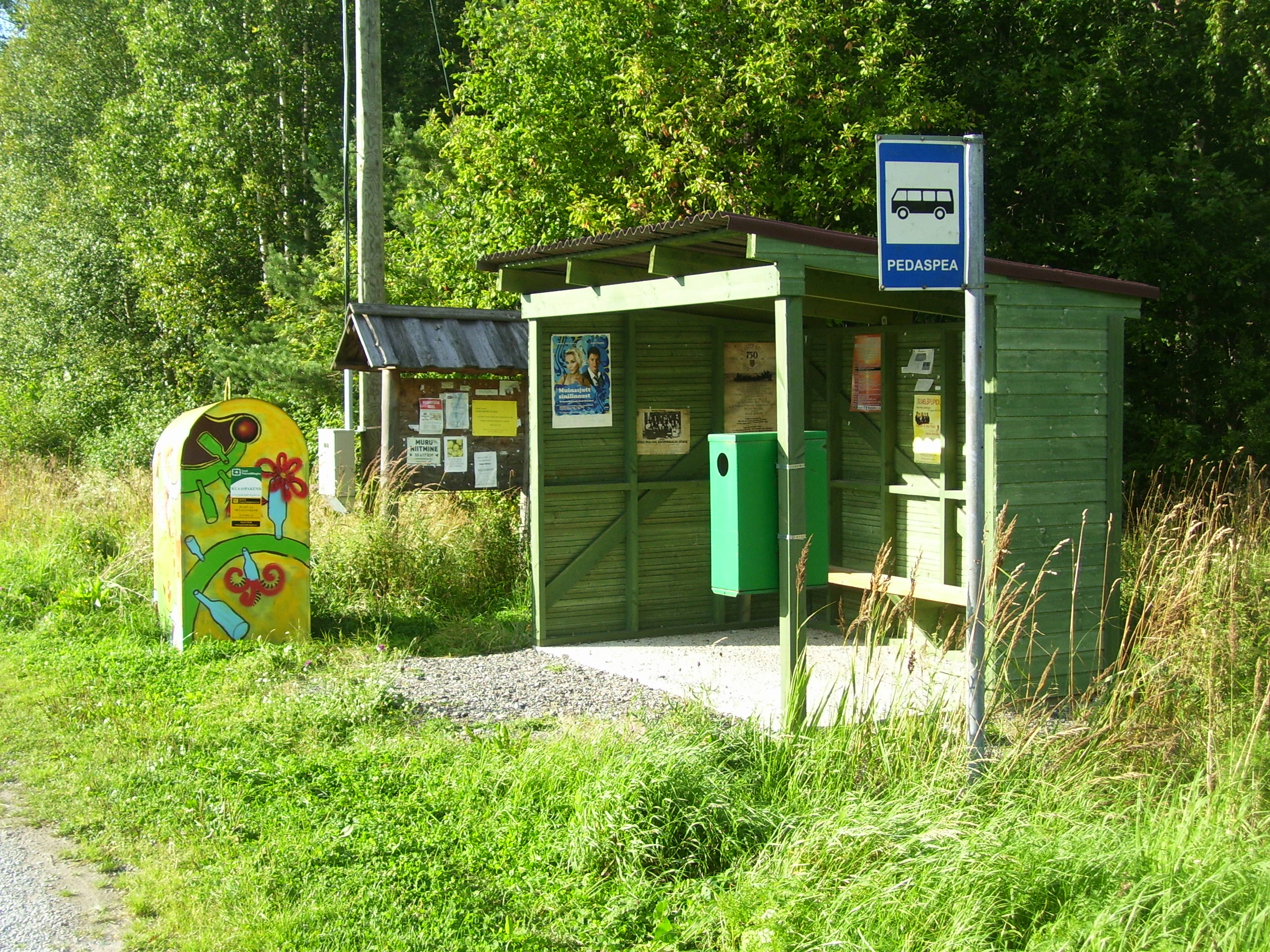
Pedaspea bus stop

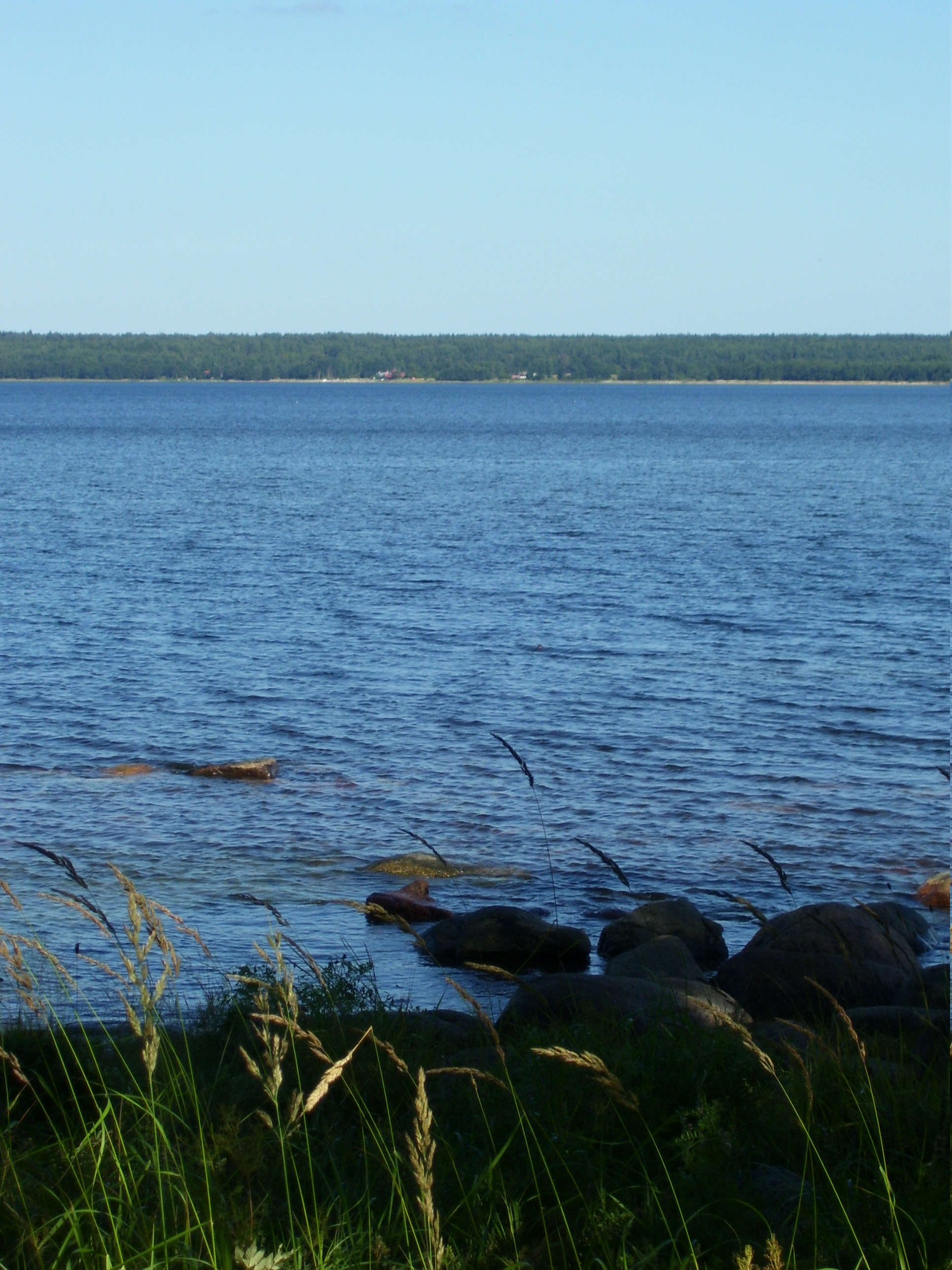
View at Pedaspea over the bay from Tsitre.
