= Saue =

Town in Estonia

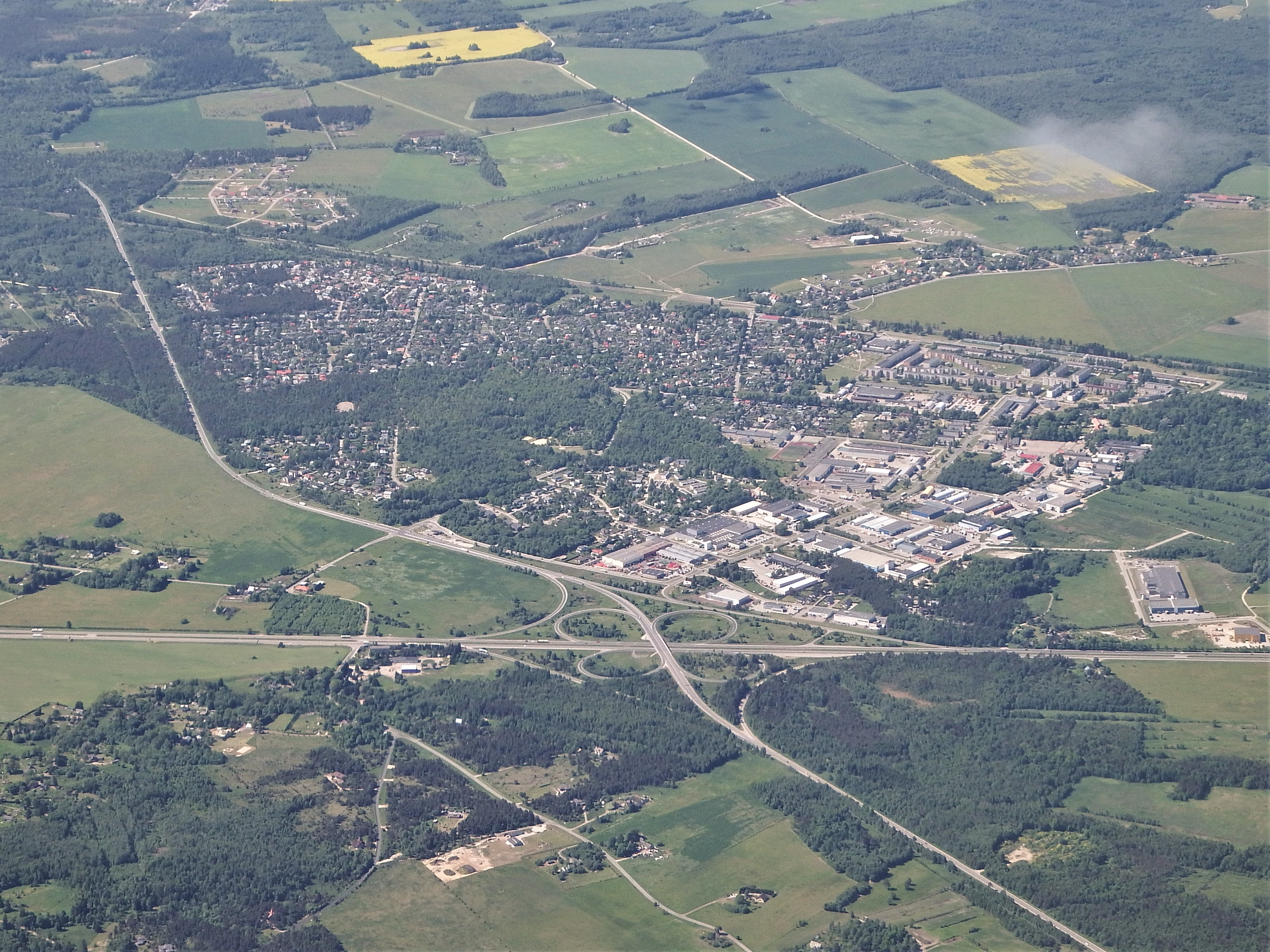
- Aerial view of Saue

- Location in Estonia
- Coordinates: 59.323°N 24.5622°E
- Country: Estonia
- County: Harju County
- Municipality: Saue Parish

Area
  - Total: 3.49 km^{2} (1.35 sq mi)

Population (2026)
  - Total: 6,146
  - Rank: 17th

Ethnicity
  - Estonians: 93.3%
  - Russians: 4.6%
  - other: 2.1%
- Time zone: UTC+2 (EET)
  - Summer (DST): UTC+3 (EEST)

Saue is a town in north-western Estonia. It is the administrative centre of Saue Parish in Harju County.

The territory of Saue is 3.50 square kilometres (1.35 sq mi) and population about 6,100. Closest centres are Tallinn (18 km (11 mi)), Keila (7 km (4 mi)), Saku (7 km (4 mi)) and Laagri (7 km (4 mi)).

== Geography ==
Saue is located near Tallinn, the capital of Estonia. It attracts moderately wealthy people who like the balance between the small town and big city atmosphere. While Saue is close to nature, it still entertainment, jobs, and other city amenities.

== History ==
- 1620s – Saue manor (Klein-Sauß) was established
- 1792 - The current manor house was built
- 1870 - The Saint Petersburg–Tallinn–Paldiski railway passing Saue was completed
- 1920s – Garden settlement started to arise
- 1960s – Saue was united with Tallinn
- 1973 – Saue, still part of Tallinn, gained a borough (alev) status
- 1993 – Saue was granted the town rights
- 1994 – Saue was separated from Tallinn and given a separate urban municipality status
- 2017 – Saue town, Saue Parish, Kernu Parish and Nissi Parish were united and a new Saue Parish was formed

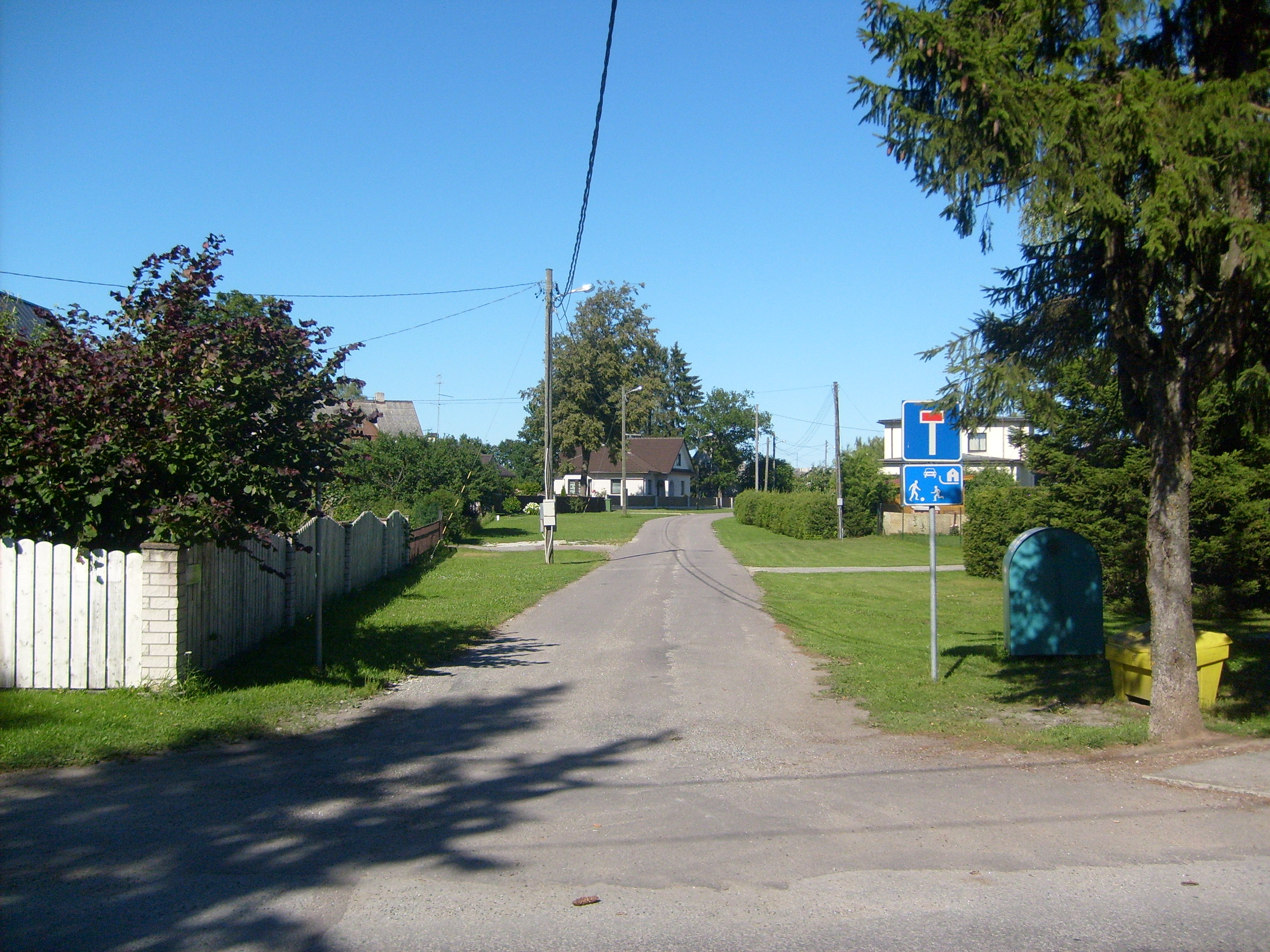
Street in Saue

== Demographics ==
93% of the people living in Saue are ethnic Estonians. The average age of people is 35. Over the years, the census of the population has shown that the population is slowly growing. In 1959 there were 1,088 people living in Saue, by 1970 it had increased to 1,979. In 1979 it was 3,293, in 1989 the population was 4,395, in 1995 it was 4,492 and finally, by 2000, the population was 4,996.

Ethnic composition 1934, 1979–2021
Ethnicity	1934		1979		1989		2000		2011		2021	
Ethnicity	amount	%	amount	%	amount	%	amount	%	amount	%	amount	%
Estonians	47	95.9	2991	90.8	3955	90.0	4555	91.9	5145	93.3	5432	93.2
Russians	0	0.00	203	6.16	305	6.94	267	5.39	259	4.70	226	3.88
Ukrainians	-	-	25	0.76	44	1.00	-	-	42	0.76	61	1.05
Belarusians	-	-	22	0.67	22	0.50	-	-	13	0.24	10	0.17
Finns	-	-	23	0.70	31	0.71	-	-	17	0.31	17	0.29
Jews	-	-	5	0.15	2	0.05	-	-	2	0.04	0	0.00
Latvians	0	0.00	10	0.30	8	0.18	-	-	4	0.07	9	0.15
Germans	2	4.10	0	0.00	6	0.14	-	-	8	0.15	5	0.09
Tatars	-	-	4	0.12	7	0.16	-	-	4	0.07	0	0.00
Poles	-	-	0	0.00	3	0.07	-	-	2	0.04	0	0.00
Lithuanians	-	-	5	0.15	3	0.07	-	-	2	0.04	3	0.05
unknown	0	0.00	0	0.00	0	0.00	23	0.46	3	0.05	19	0.33
other	0	0.00	5	0.15	9	0.20	113	2.28	13	0.24	42	0.72
Total	49	100	3293	100	4395	100	4958	100	5514	100	5826	99.9

== Economy ==
In Saue there is 1.30 square kilometres (0.50 sq mi) of private plots (average size of a plot is about 700 m^{2} (7,500 sq ft)) – 1015 plots, about 0.35 km^{2} (0.14 sq mi) of communal buildings, garages etc., 0.25 km^{2} (0.097 sq mi) of industrial areas, Streets and roads about 0.30 km^{2} (0.12 sq mi) (there are 62 streets in Saue – about 21 km (13 mi)), about 1.12 km^{2} (0.43 sq mi) of forests, parks etc. and about 0.15 km^{2} (0.058 sq mi) of fields.

== Transport ==
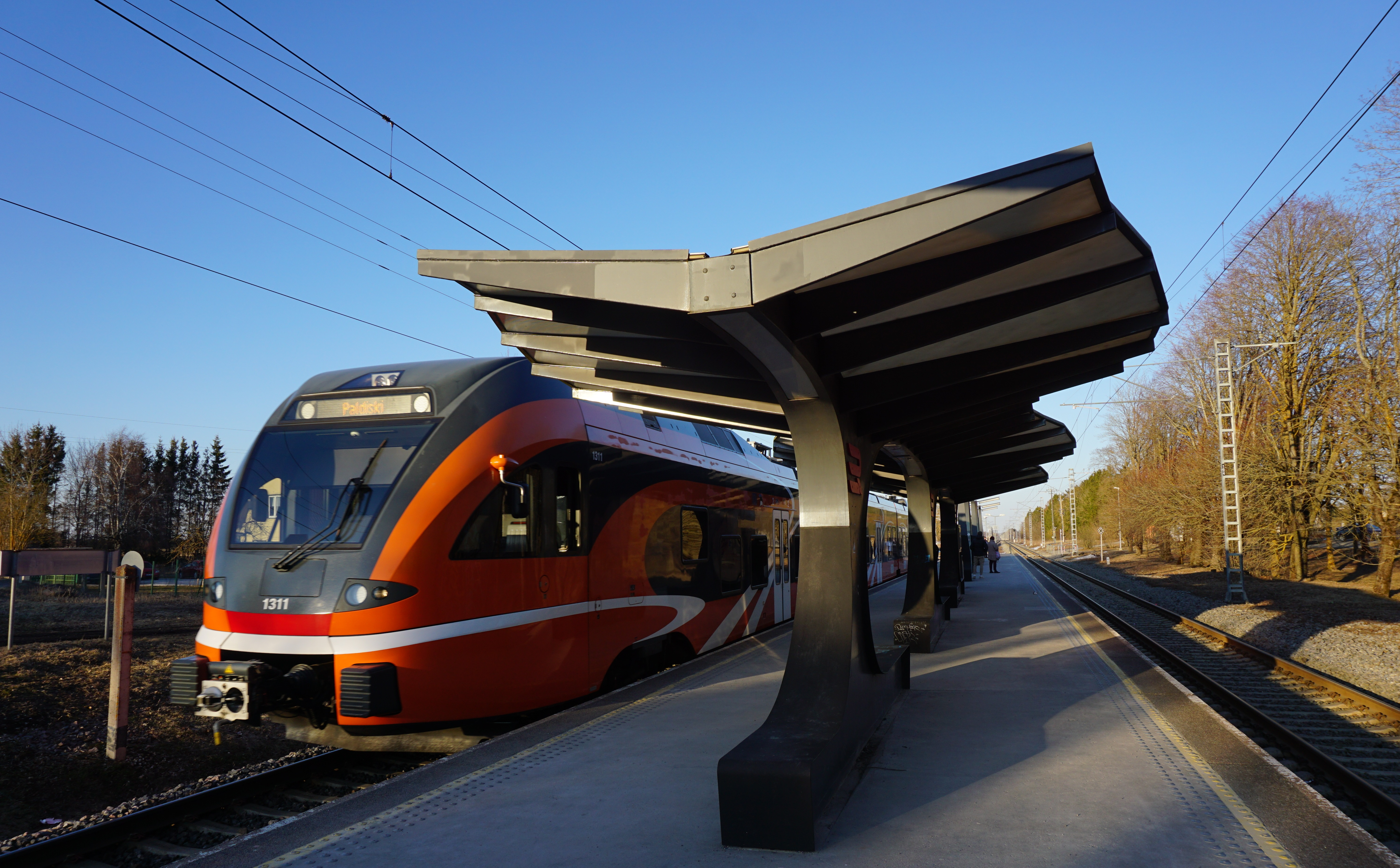
Saue railway station in 2022.

Saue is served by Saue railway station on the Tallinn-Keila railway line (serviced by Elron), as well as bus connections and fixed-route taxis.

== Saue Manor ==
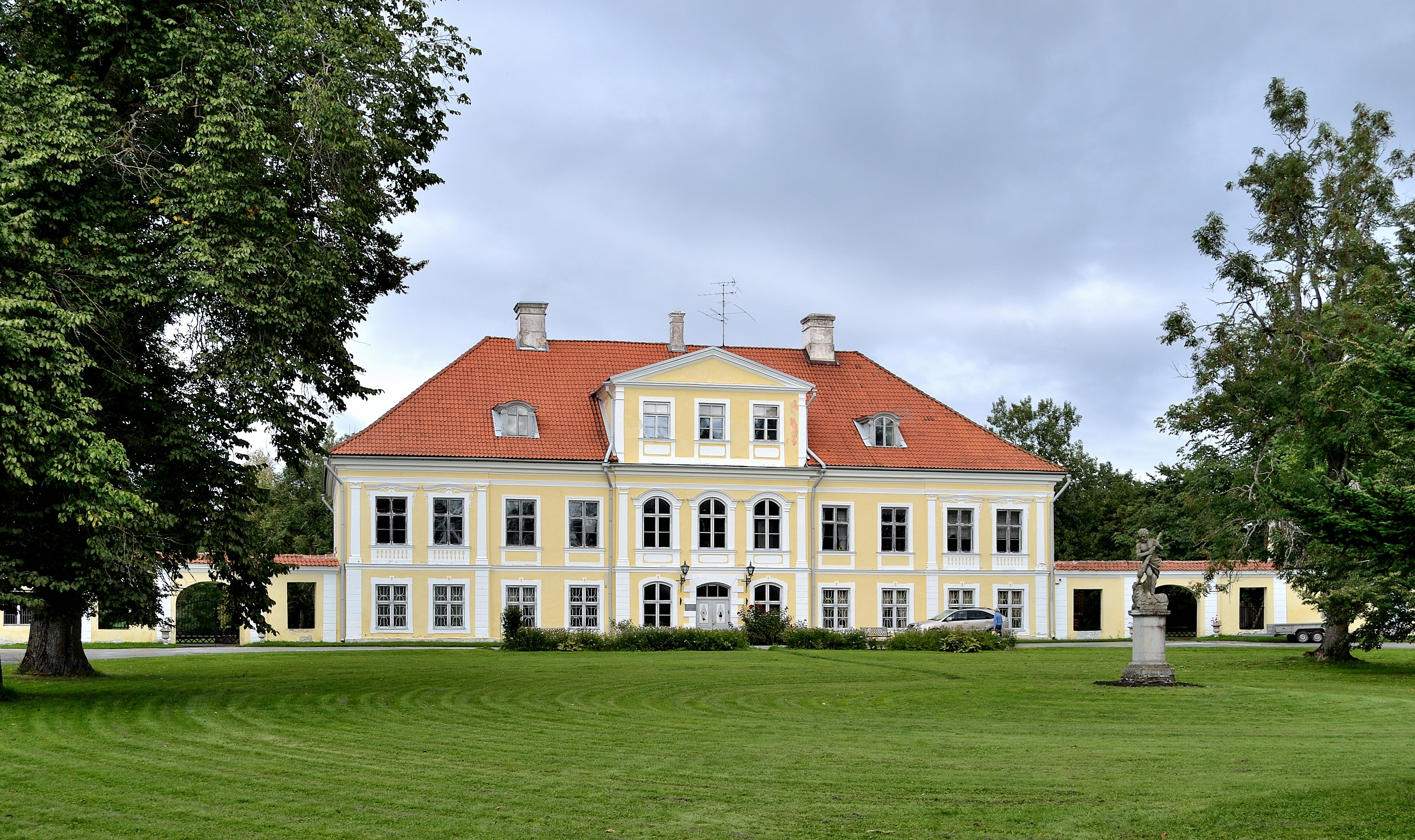
Saue Manor

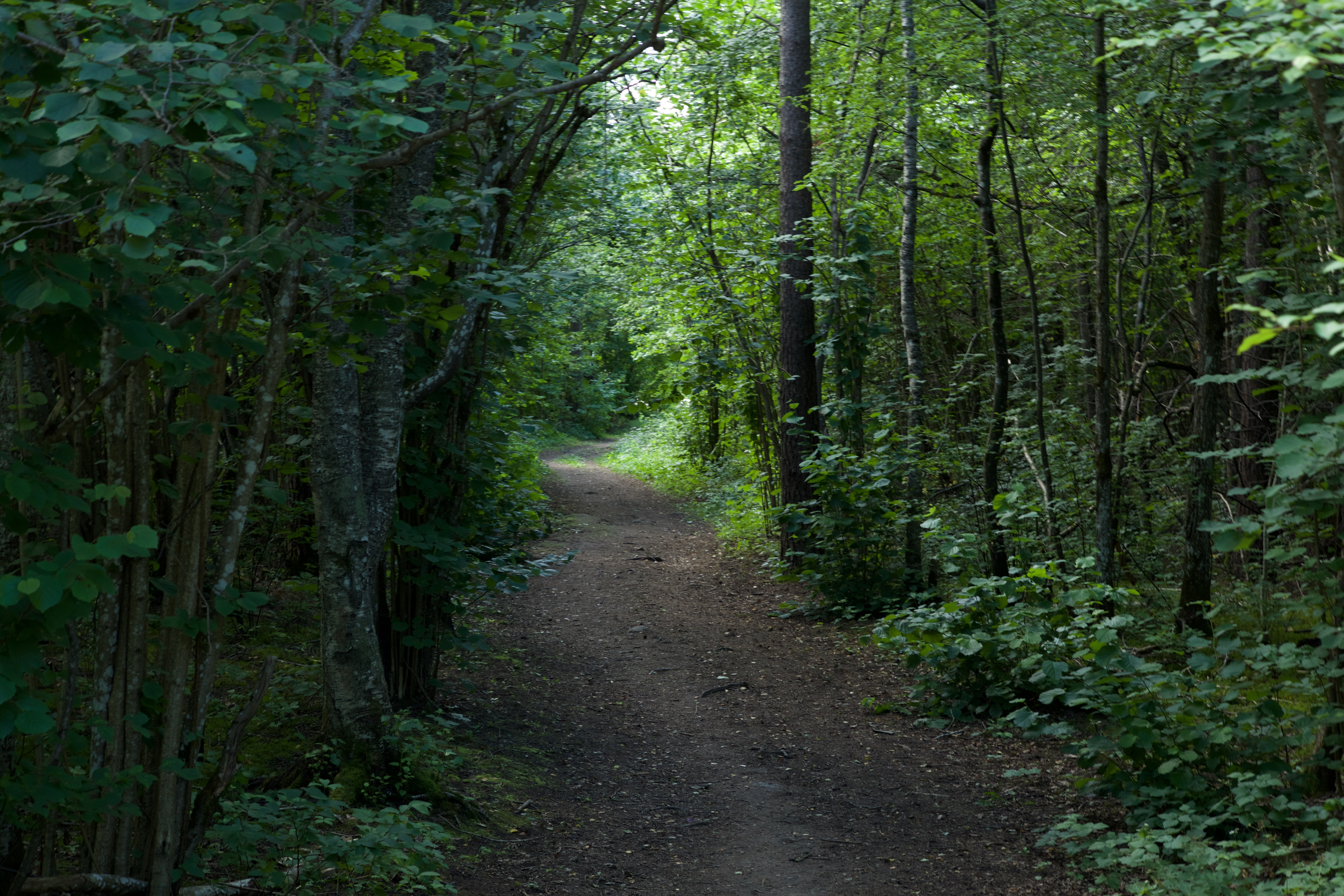
Sarapiku Fitness Trail in Saue

Saue Manor (German: Friedrichshof) traces its origins to at least the 17th century. The current building was erected when the estate was owned by Friedrich Hermann von Fersen. The architect was very probably Johann Schultz, who was also the architect behind the baroque extension of Toompea Castle, Tallinn. The manor house complex is one of the finest examples of baroque manor house architecture in Estonia.

The exterior of the main house is characterised by a ground storey with rustications and a pilastered main floor. Wings (a stable-coach house and a granary) are linked to the main building via arched walls. The remains of a baroque park surrounds the manor, with noteworthy details such as sculptures of Heracles and Hera, and baroque sculptured reliefs.

The interior is known for its stucco decorations of high quality in late baroque-early neoclassicist style. Stucco decorations adorn all the main rooms of the manor. Additionally, there are fine baroque cocklestoves in the manor.

== Notable people ==
- Ingemar Teever (born 1983), football player
- Johannes Herm (1893–1926), commander of the Estonian Navy
