= Paaskula =

Paaskula, Pääsküla, or Paasküla could refer to:

- Pääsküla, a subdistrict of Nõmme, Tallinn, in Estonia
  - Pääsküla railway station, a railway station in Pääsküla, Nõmme
- Pääsküla (river), a river in Harju county, Estonia
- Pääsküla Bog, a bog in Harju county, Estonia
- Paasküla, a village in Lääne-Viru county, Estonia
