= Laagri, Tallinn =

Subdistrict of Tallinn, Estonia

Coordinates: 59.355109°N 24.622496°E

Laagri
- Subdistrict of Tallinn
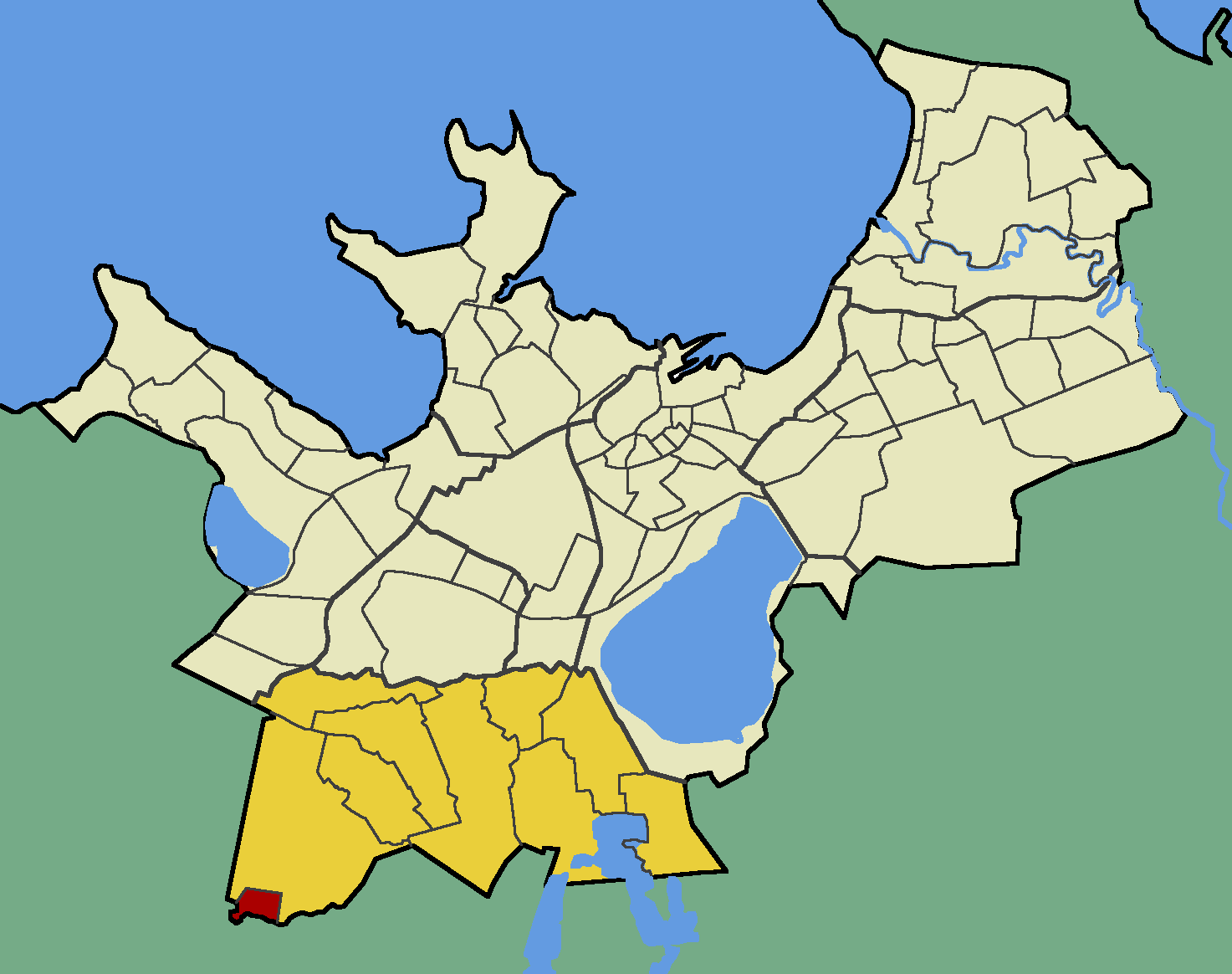
- Laagri within Nõmme District
- Country: Estonia
- County: Harju County
- City: Tallinn
- District: Nõmme

Area
  - Total: 0.55 km^{2} (0.21 sq mi)

Population (01.01.2014)
  - Total: 935
  - Density: 1,700/km^{2} (4,400/sq mi)

Laagri (Estonian for "Camp") is a subdistrict (Estonian: asum) in the district of Nõmme, Tallinn, the capital of Estonia. It covers an area of 0.55 km^{2} (0.21 sq mi) and has a population of 935 (as of 1 January 2014), and a population density of 1,600/km^{2} (4,140/sq mi). It is the southernmost subdistrict of Tallinn.

Like the borough of the same name, it is served by the Laagri railway stop on the Tallinn-Turba line, Elron's western route.

== Gallery ==
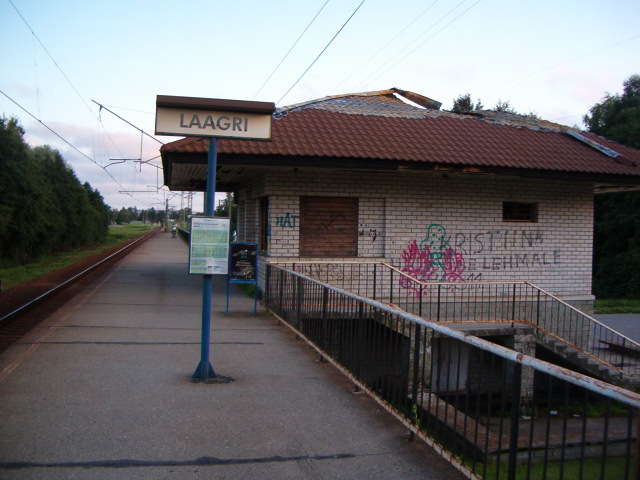
Laagri old train station

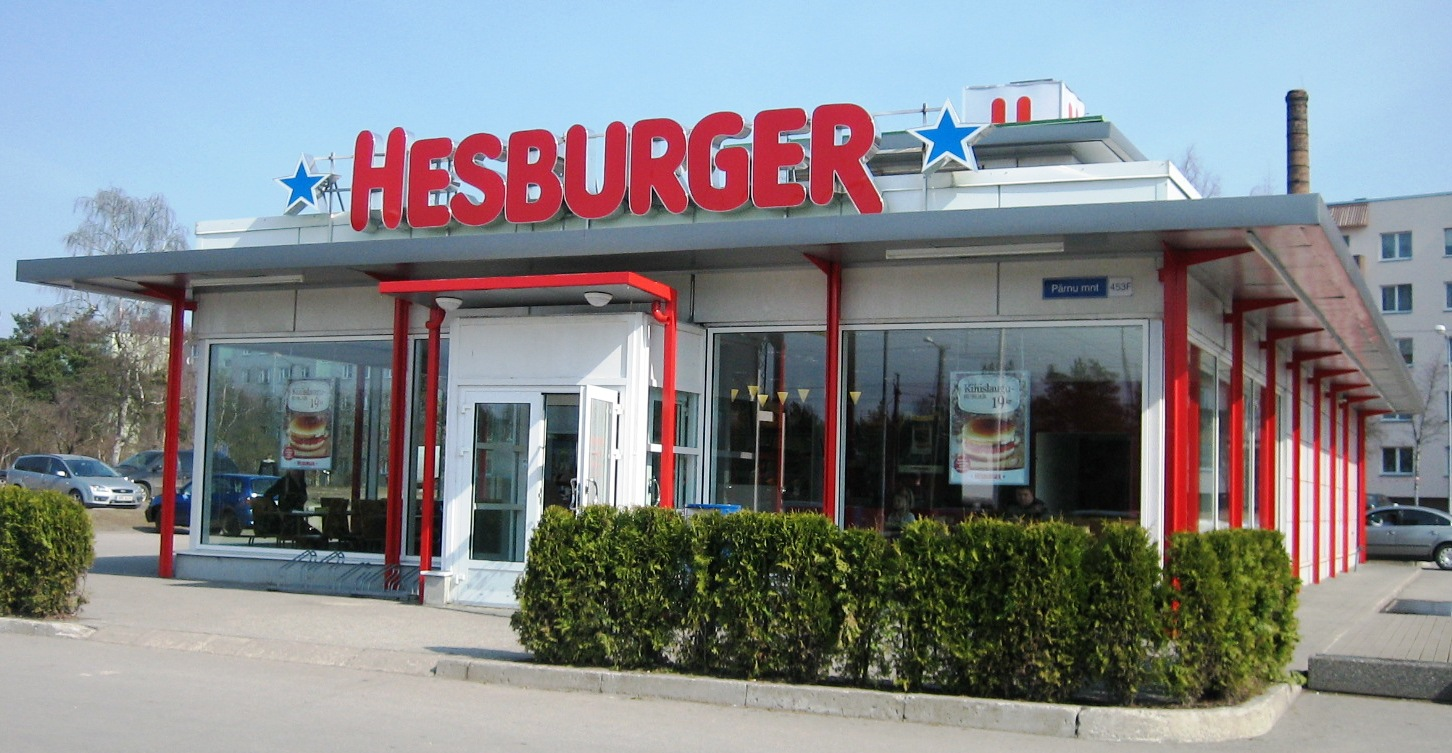
Hesburger fast-food restaurant

Preceding station	Elron	Following station
Pääsküla towards Tallinn	Tallinn–Turba/Paldiski	Urda towards Turba, Kloogaranna or Paldiski
