= Koidu, Harju County =

Village in Estonia

Koidu
- Village
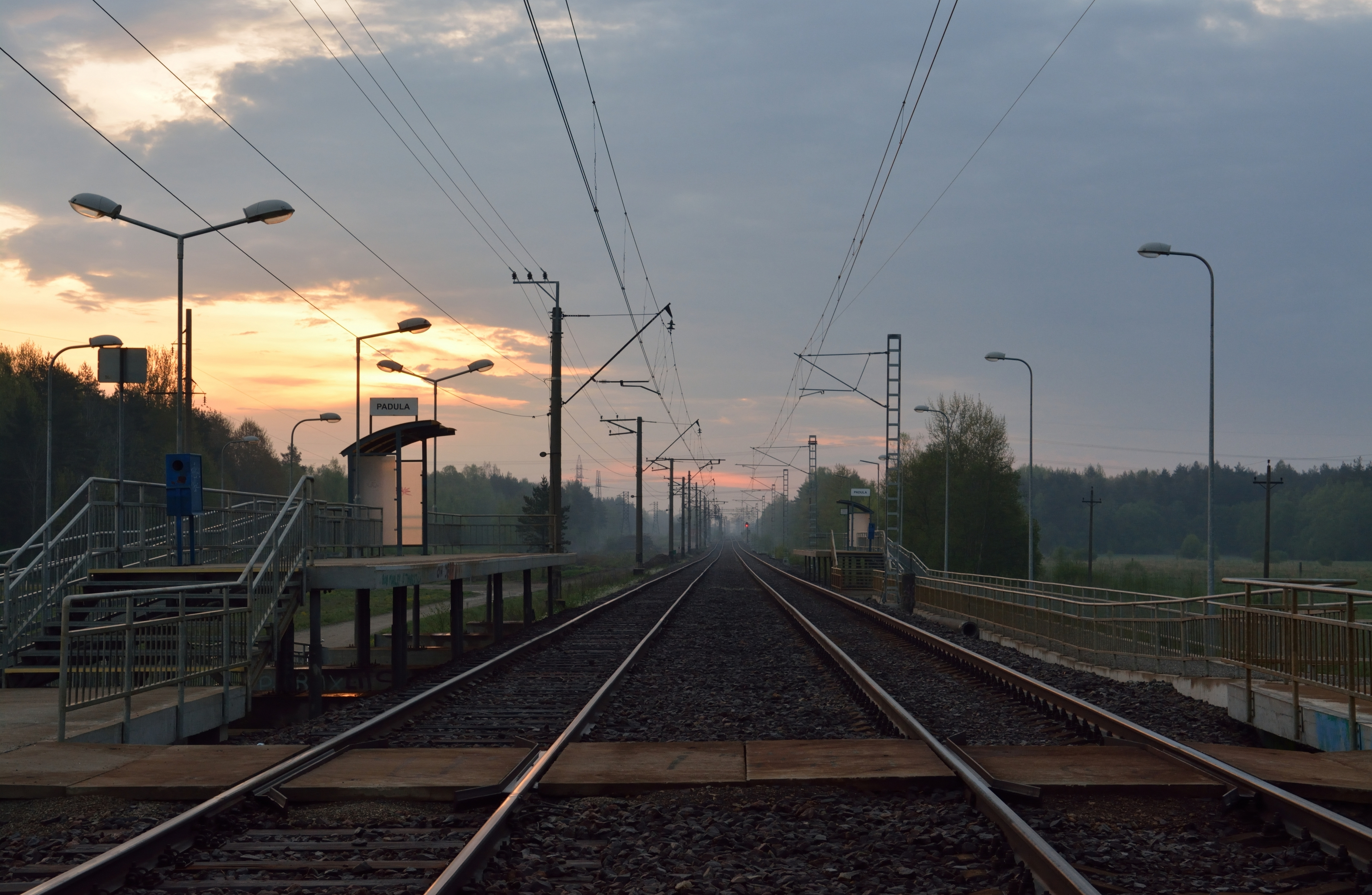
- Padula railway station in Koidu village.

- Location in Estonia
- Coordinates: 59°20′38″N 24°35′21″E
- Country: Estonia
- County: Harju County
- Municipality: Saue Parish
- Established: 16 July 2012

Koidu is a village in Saue Parish, Harju County in northern Estonia. It's located southwest of Estonian capital Tallinn (about 13 km (8 mi) from the city centre), just next to Laagri, the administrative centre of the municipality. The town of Saue is situated about 3.8 km (2 mi) southwest. Koidu is bordered by the Vääna River to the southwest and by the Tallinn–Keila–Paldiski railway to the southeast. There's a railway station named "Padula" in Koidu village.

Koidu village was established on 16 July 2012 by detaching the land from Alliku village. The initiative came from the local community.
