= Kivimäe, Tallinn =

Subdistrict of Tallinn, Estonia

Coordinates: 59.377278°N 24.657097°E

Kivimäe
- Subdistrict of Tallinn
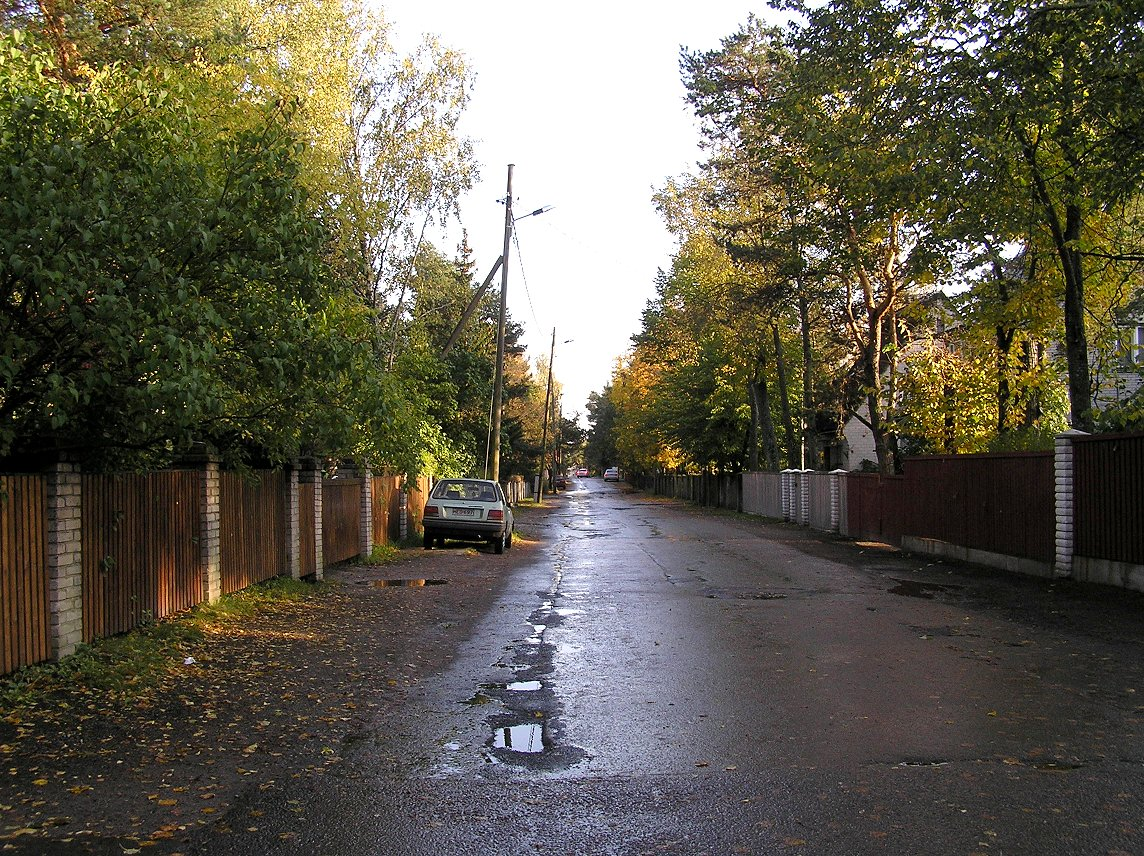
- Typical street in Kivimäe

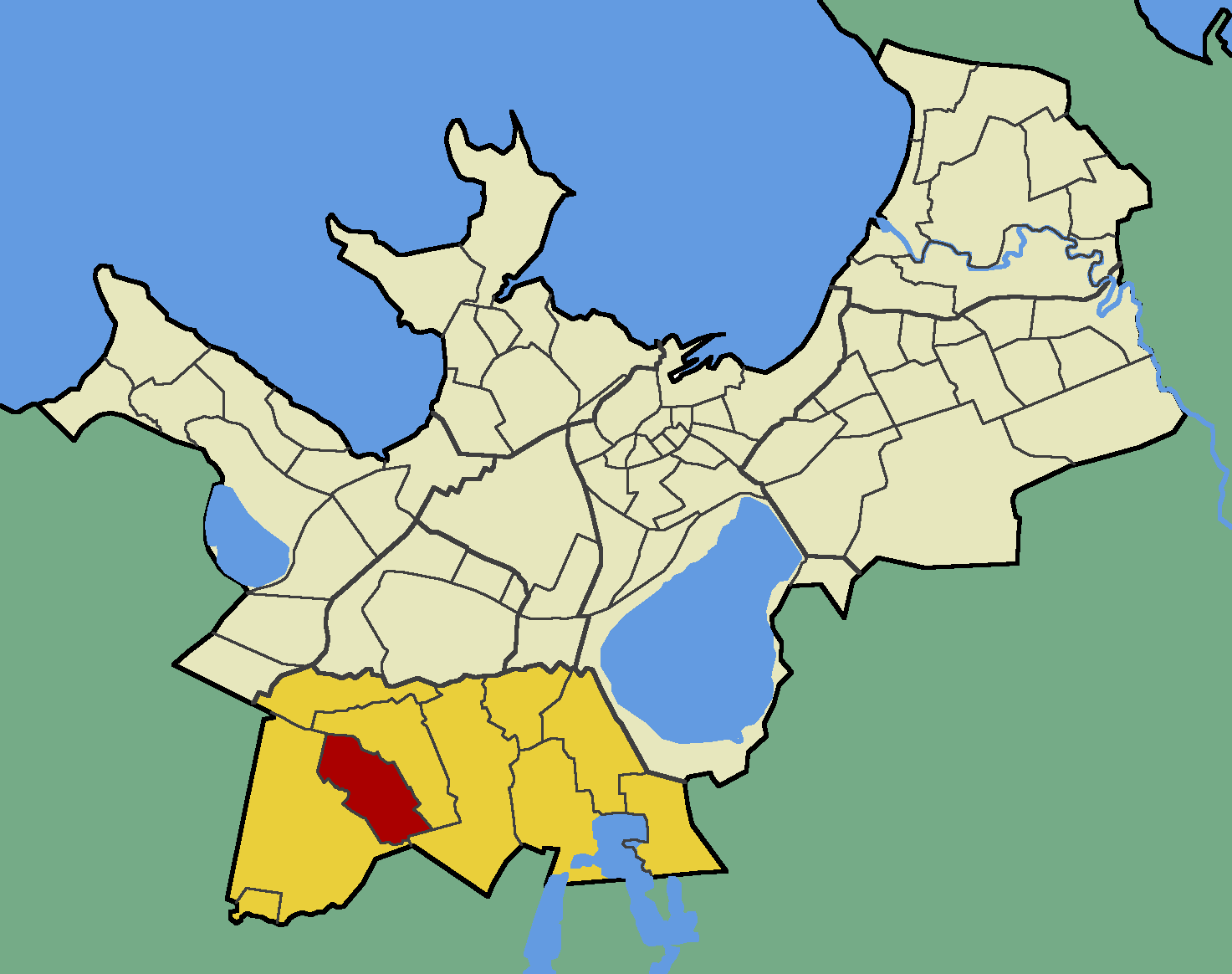
- Kivimäe within Nõmme District.
- Country: Estonia
- County: Harju County
- City: Tallinn
- District: Nõmme

Area
  - Total: 2.20 km^{2} (0.85 sq mi)

Population (01.01.2014)
  - Total: 4,936
  - Density: 2,240/km^{2} (5,810/sq mi)

Kivimäe (Estonian for 'stone hill') is a subdistrict (Estonian: asum) in the district of Nõmme, Tallinn, the capital of Estonia. It covers an area of 2.20 km^{2} (0.85 sq mi) and has a population of 4,936 (as of 1 January 2014), with a population density of 2,153/km^{2} (5,576/sq mi).

Kivimäe has a station on the Elron western route.

== Gallery ==
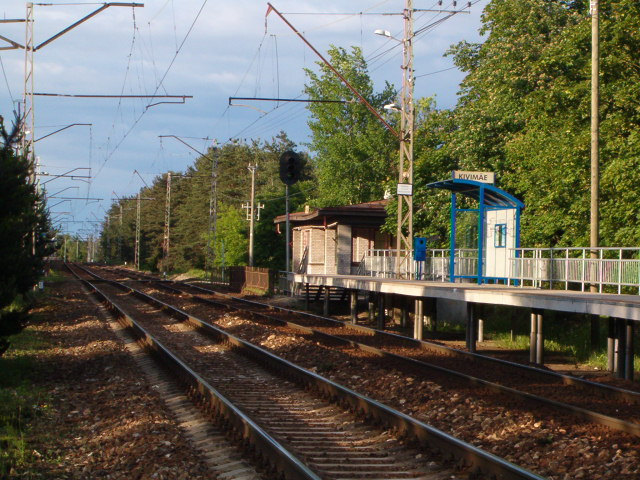
Kivimäe train station

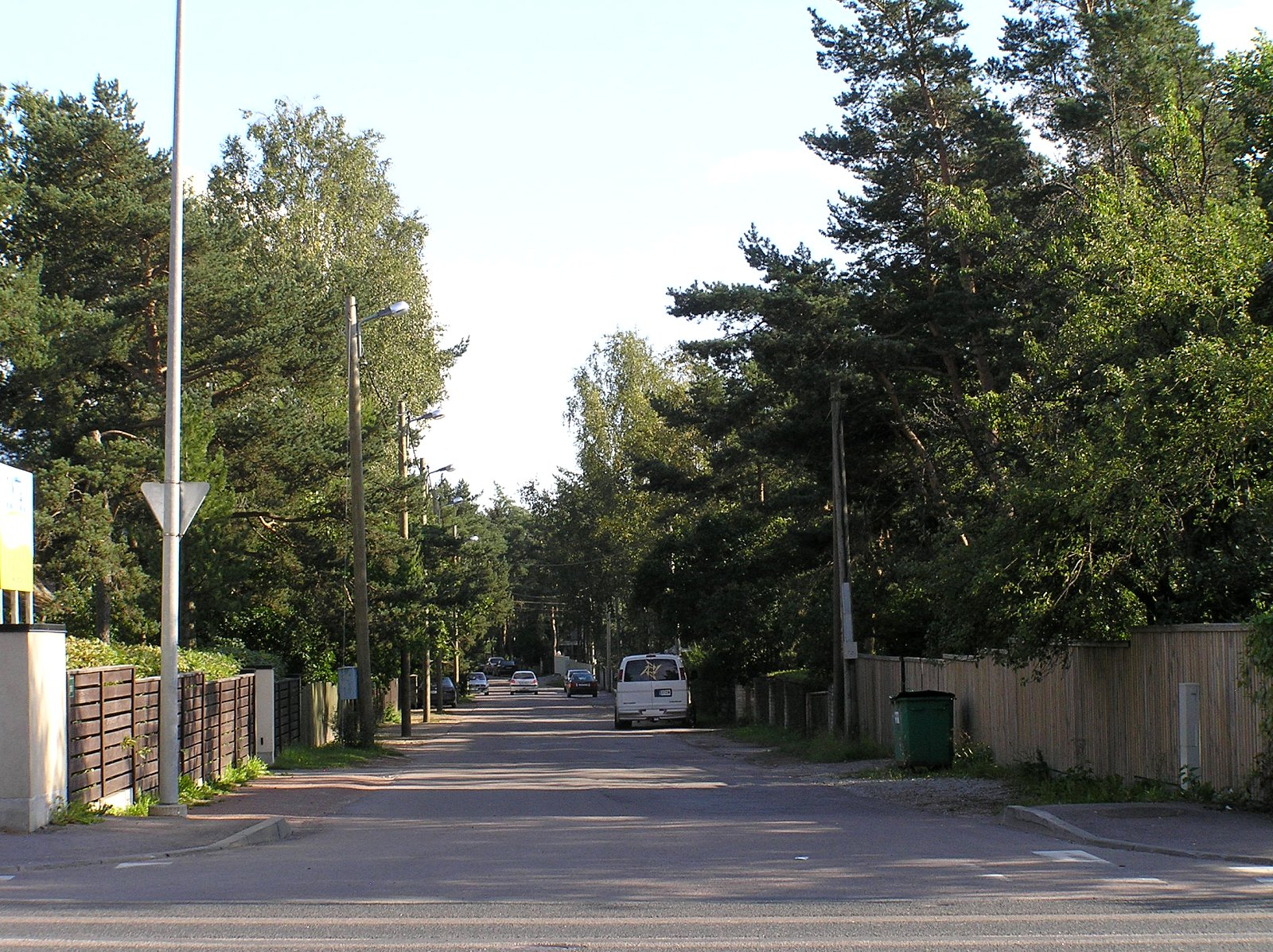
Ugala Street (Ugala tänav)

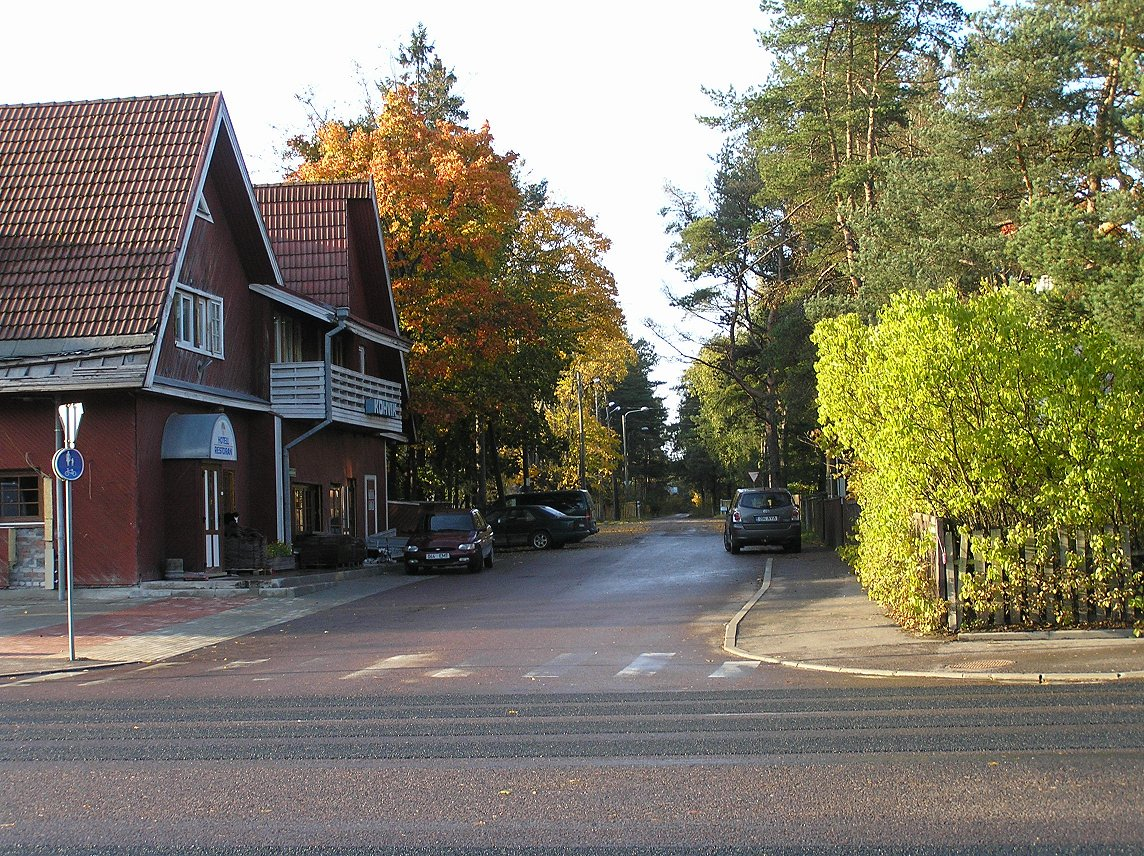
Sanatorium Street (Sanatooriumi tänav)

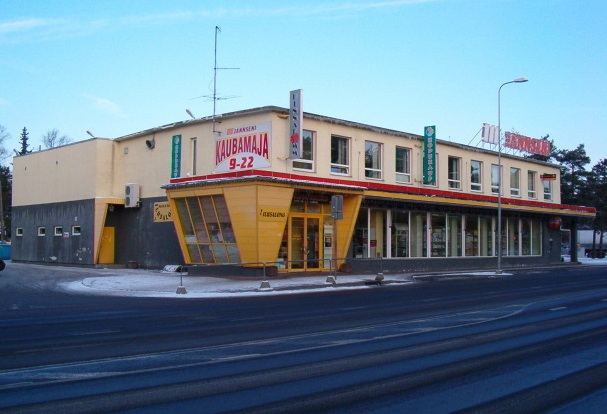
Local Jannsen Department Store (Jannseni Kaubamaja) shopping centre

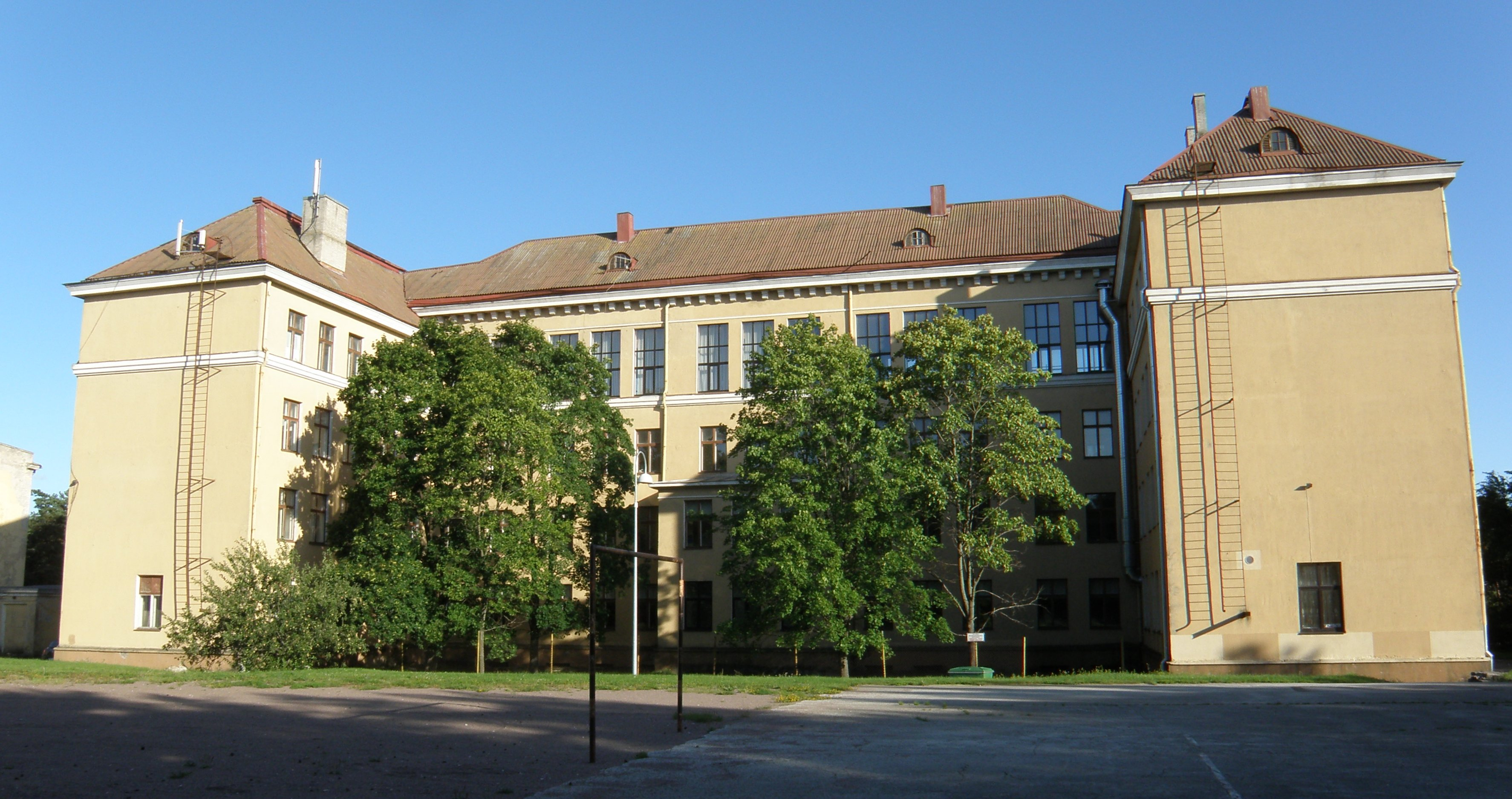
Tallinn Music High School

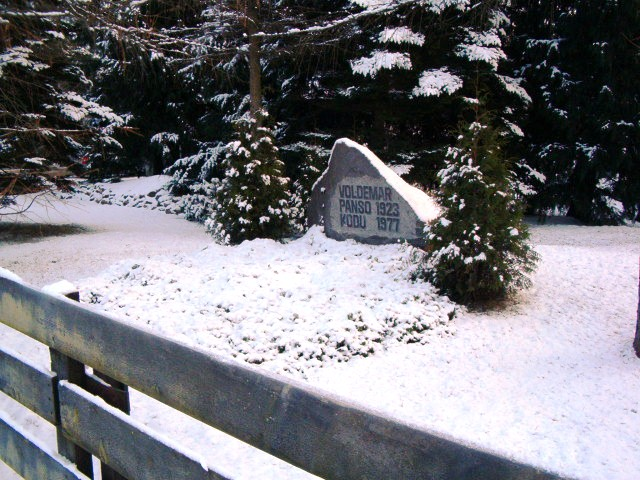
Memorial stone to actor and theatre director Voldemar Panso

Preceding station	Elron	Following station
Hiiu towards Tallinn	Tallinn–Turba/Paldiski	Pääsküla towards Turba, Kloogaranna or Paldiski
