= Padula railway station =

Railway station in Harju County, Estonia

Padula
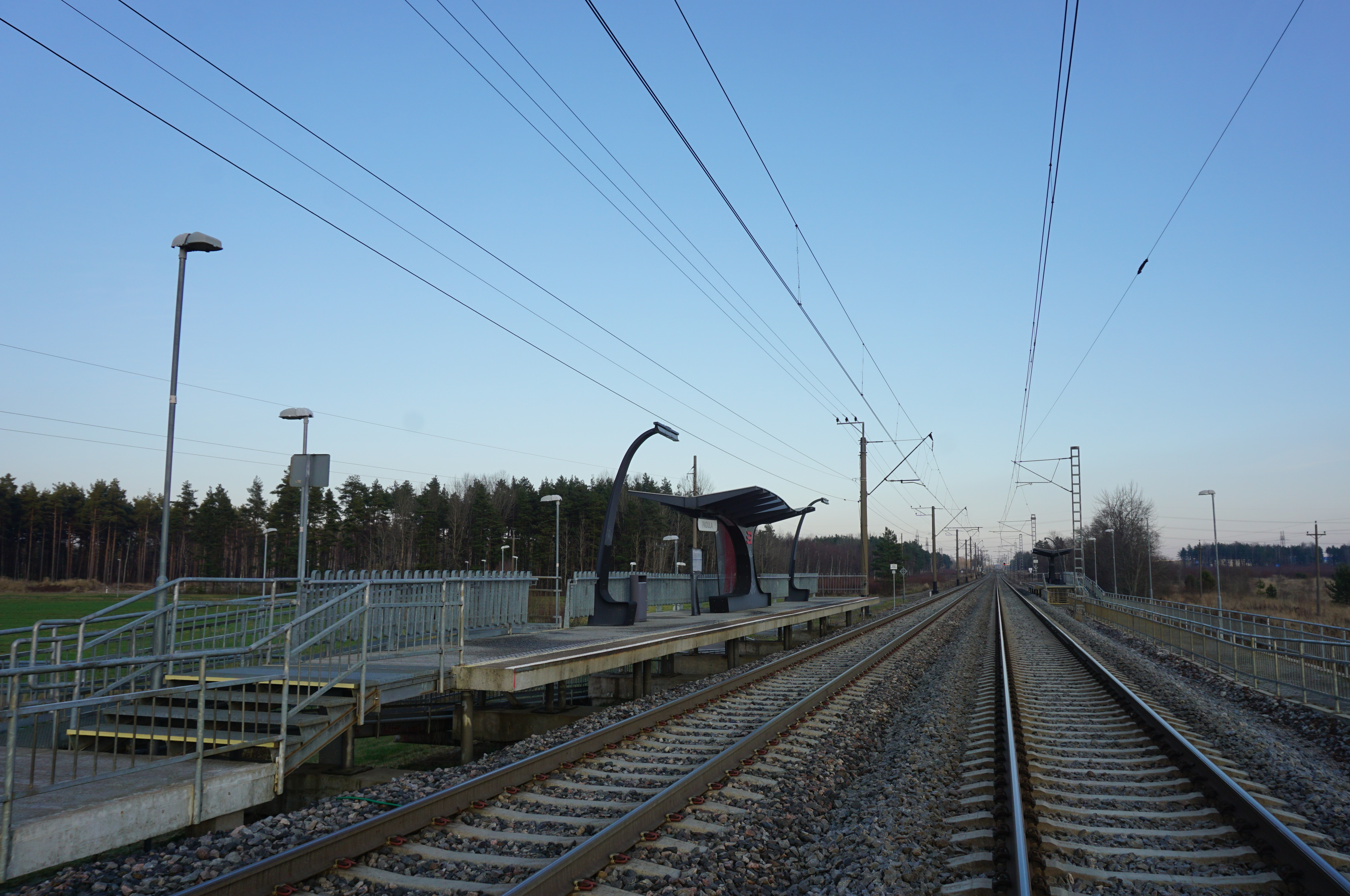
- Padula railway station in 2020

General information
- Location: Laagri/Koidu, Saue Parish, Harju County; Estonia
- Coordinates: 59.337778°N 24.591944°E
- System: railway station
- Owner: Eesti Raudtee (EVR)
- Platforms: 2
- Tracks: 2
- Train operators: Elron

Construction
- Structure type: at-grade
- Accessible: yes

Other information
- Fare zone: II

History
- Opened: 2008; 18 years ago

Services
Preceding station	Elron	Following station
Urda towards Tallinn	Tallinn–Turba/Paldiski	Saue towards Turba, Kloogaranna or Paldiski
Location
- Location within Estonia Location within Harju County

Padula railway station (Estonian: Padula raudteepeatus) is a railway station in Saue parish in Harju County in northern Estonia. It is located on the border between the small borough of Laagri and the village of Koidu. The stop is named after the Padula inn and farm that was once located in the area.

The Padula railway station is located on the Tallinn-Keila railway line, between Urda and Saue railway stations and approximately 15 kilometers (8 mi) southwest from the Baltic station (Estonian: Balti jaam) which is the main railway station of Tallinn. The station was officially opened in 2008 together with Kitseküla and Urda railway stations.

Only Elron's electric trains from Tallinn to Turba stop at Padula station. In 2024, there were approximately 15 train departures per day at Padula railway station towards Tallinn city center.

== See also ==
- List of railway stations in Estonia
- Rail transport in Estonia
