= Laagri railway station =

Railway station in Tallinn, Estonia

Laagri
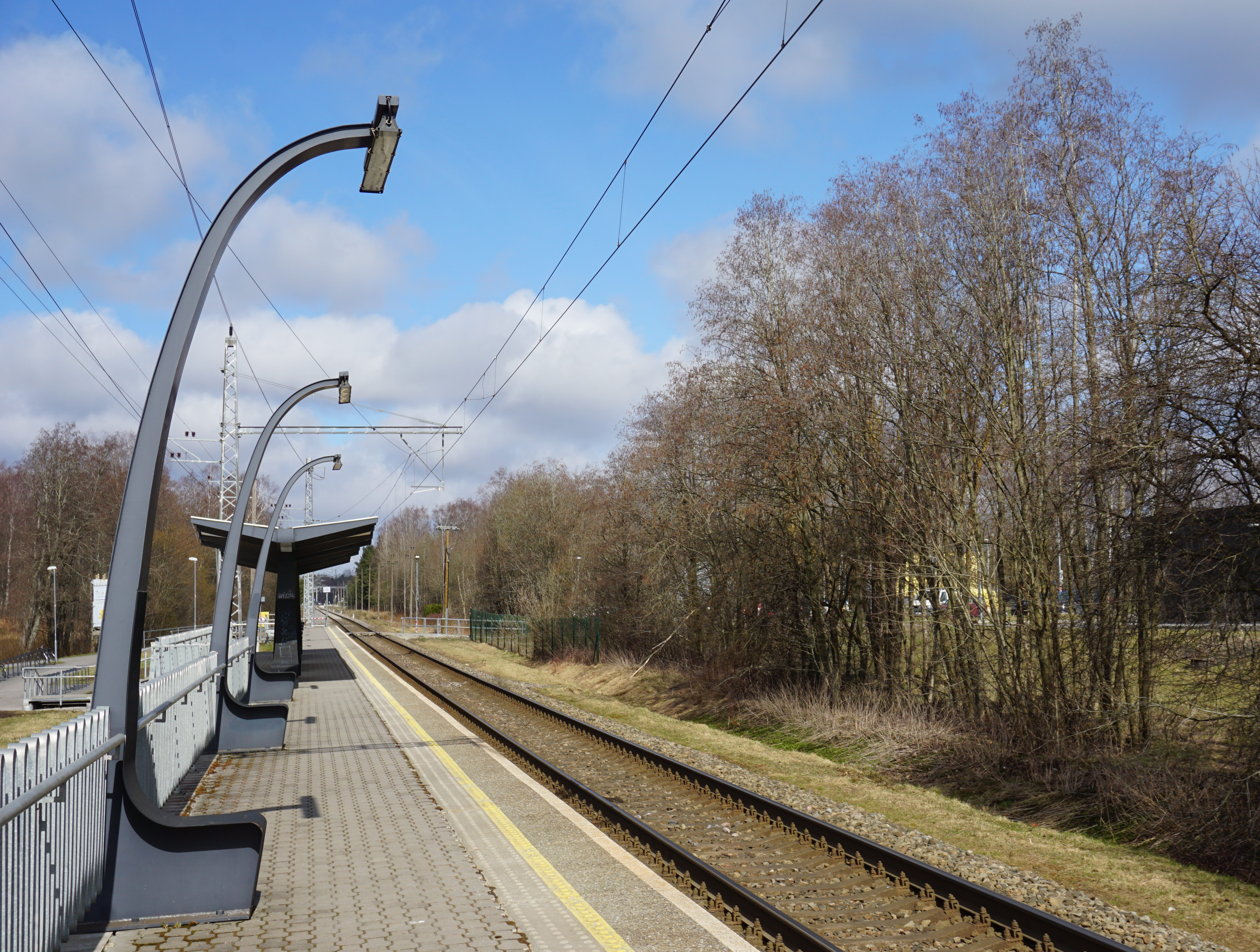
- Laagri railway station in 2020

General information
- Location: Laagri, Nõmme, Tallinn, Harju County; Estonia
- Coordinates: 59.3545°N 24.6275°E
- System: railway station
- Owner: Eesti Raudtee (EVR)
- Platforms: 2
- Tracks: 2
- Train operators: Elron

Construction
- Accessible: Yes

Other information
- Fare zone: I

History
- Opened: Officially: 1932; 94 years ago (Unofficially: 1928; 98 years ago)
- Electrified: 1958

Services
Preceding station	Elron	Following station
Pääsküla towards Tallinn	Tallinn–Turba/Paldiski	Urda towards Turba, Kloogaranna or Paldiski
Location
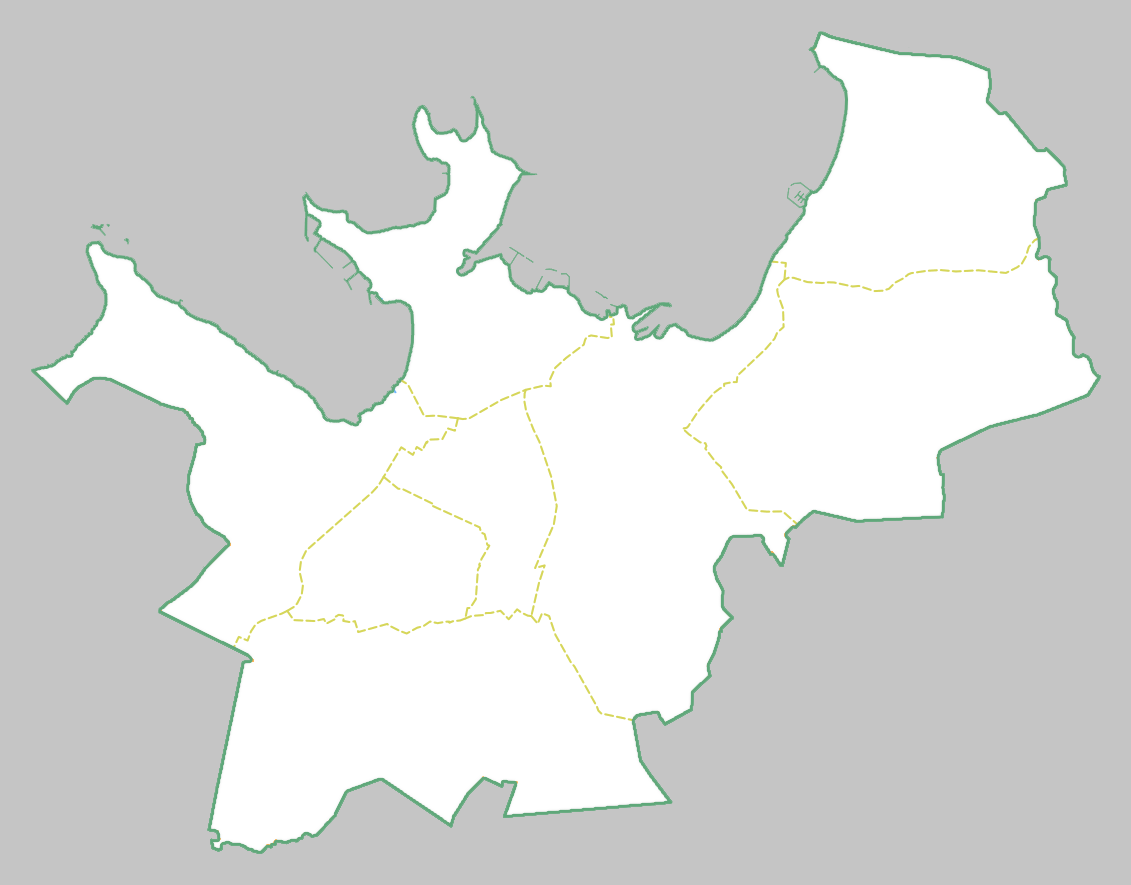
- Location within Estonia Location within Harju County Location within Tallinn

Laagri railway station (Estonian: Laagri raudteepeatus) is a station in the Nõmme district of Tallinn, Estonia. The railway station serves the Laagri sub-district of Nõmme and Laagri borough of Saue parish which in combination has approximately 6400 residents.

The station lies approximately 13 kilometers (8 mi) southwest from the Baltic station (Estonian: Balti jaam) which is the main railway station of Tallinn, near the Baltic Sea. The Laagri railway station is located between Pääsküla and Urda railway stations of Tallinn-Keila railway. The station was officially opened in 1932 but unofficially in 1928.

There is one platform along the one-track railway, 141 meters long. Elron's electric trains from Tallinn to Keila, Paldiski, Turba and Klooga-Rand stop at Laagri station. The station belongs to the Zone I, within which traffic is free for Tallinners and is the beginning of Zone II.

There is a possibility to transfer to TLT (Tallinn City Transport) bus lines 10, 14, 18 and 18A at a nearby bus station on Pärnu maantee. Bus station for bus line 20A is a little further from Laagri railway station on Veskitammi tänav.

In 2020, there were approximately 42 train departures per day at Laagri railway station towards Tallinn city center.

In 2020, Tallinn announced plans to open new train lines inside of the Tallinn city territory in the next 15 years. According to plan, no new railways have to be constructed, but some railways that are currently in use only for freight are planned to also accommodate commuter trains in the near future. One of the new lines is planned to run between two rapidly developing areas of Ülemiste and Kopli. Second line would be the already in use line Balti jaam - Laagri (currently Balti jaam - Pääsküla). Three transfer stations to hop to the other line are also planned located in Kristiine (Lilleküla station), Tondi and Järve. City is planning to use trains that belong to Elron. These trains would go back and forth the city's internal lines. The main reason for this is to have more departures inside the city, so that more people would prefer commuter trains as their main transportation mean. However, in order to implement this plan, it is necessary to acquire additional trains, build transfer stations and proper railway infrastructure, especially on the prospective Ülemiste-Kopli line. This most probably means that Laagri station would have two-lane railway in the near future instead of one-line railway.

== See also ==
- List of railway stations in Estonia
- Rail transport in Estonia
- Public transport in Tallinn
