= Pääsküla =

Subdistrict of Tallinn, Estonia

Coordinates: 59°22′10″N 24°38′06″E

- Subdistrict of Tallinn
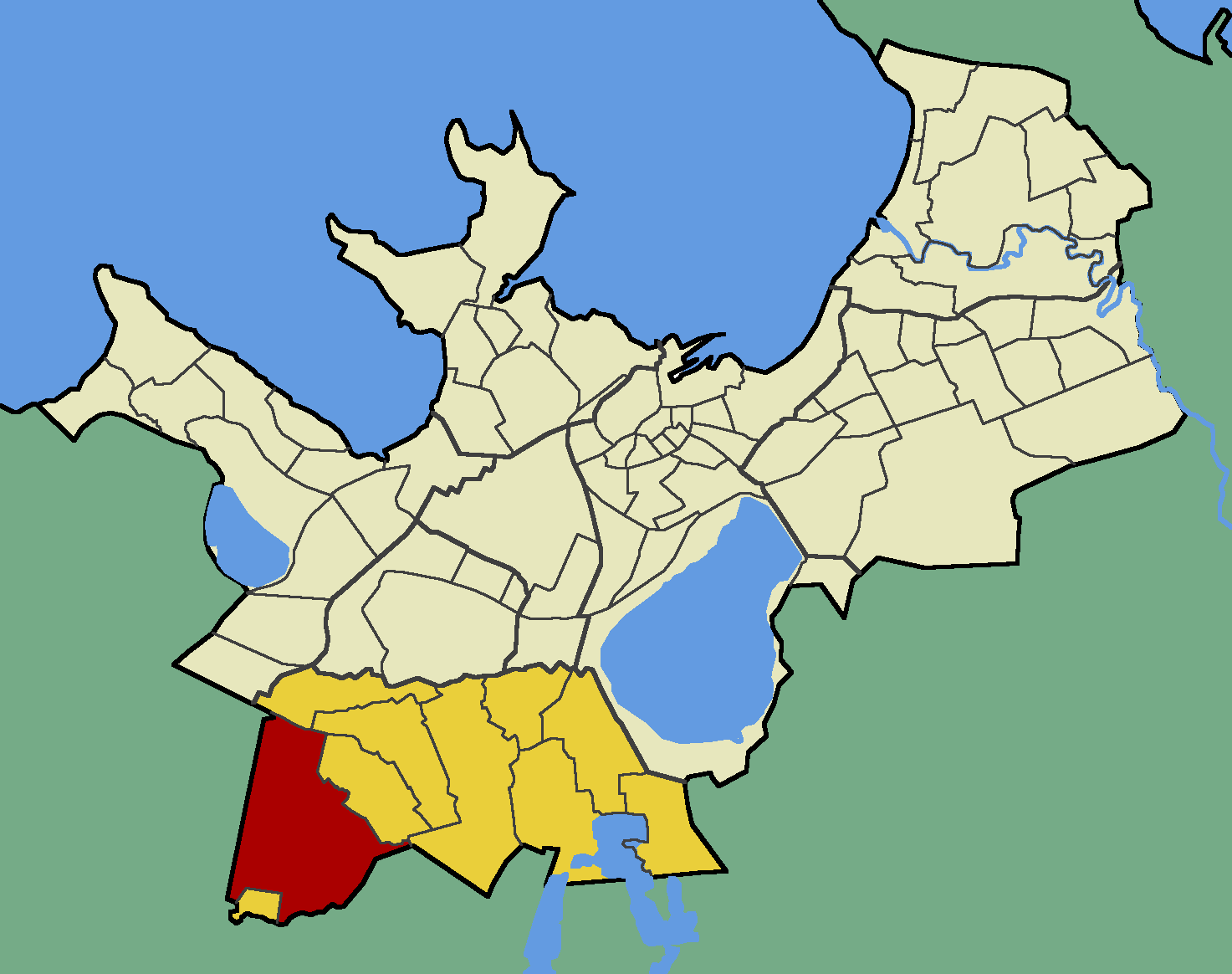
- Pääsküla within Nõmme District.
- Country: Estonia
- County: Harju County
- City: Tallinn
- District: Nõmme

Area
  - Total: 5.95 km^{2} (2.30 sq mi)

Population (01.01.2014)
  - Total: 9,948
  - Density: 1,670/km^{2} (4,330/sq mi)

Pääsküla (Estonian for "Passage Village") is a subdistrict (Estonian: asum) in the district of Nõmme, Tallinn, the capital of Estonia. It covers an area of 5.95 km^{2} (2.30 sq mi) and has a population of 9,948 (As of 1 January 2014), population density is 1,611.1/km^{2} (4,173/sq mi).

Pääsküla has a station on the Elron western route.

== Gallery ==
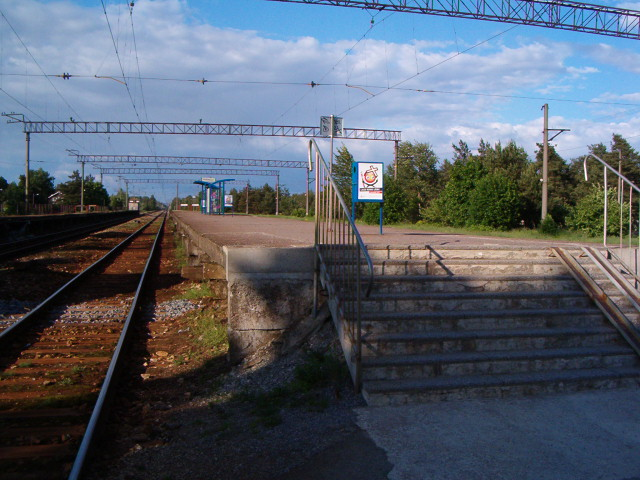
Pääsküla old train station

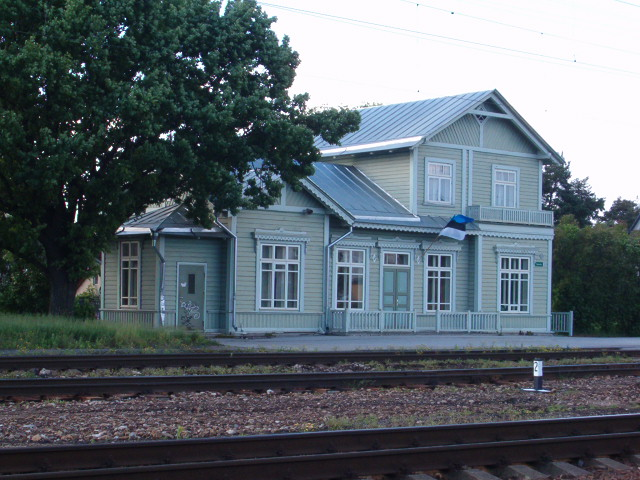
Old station building

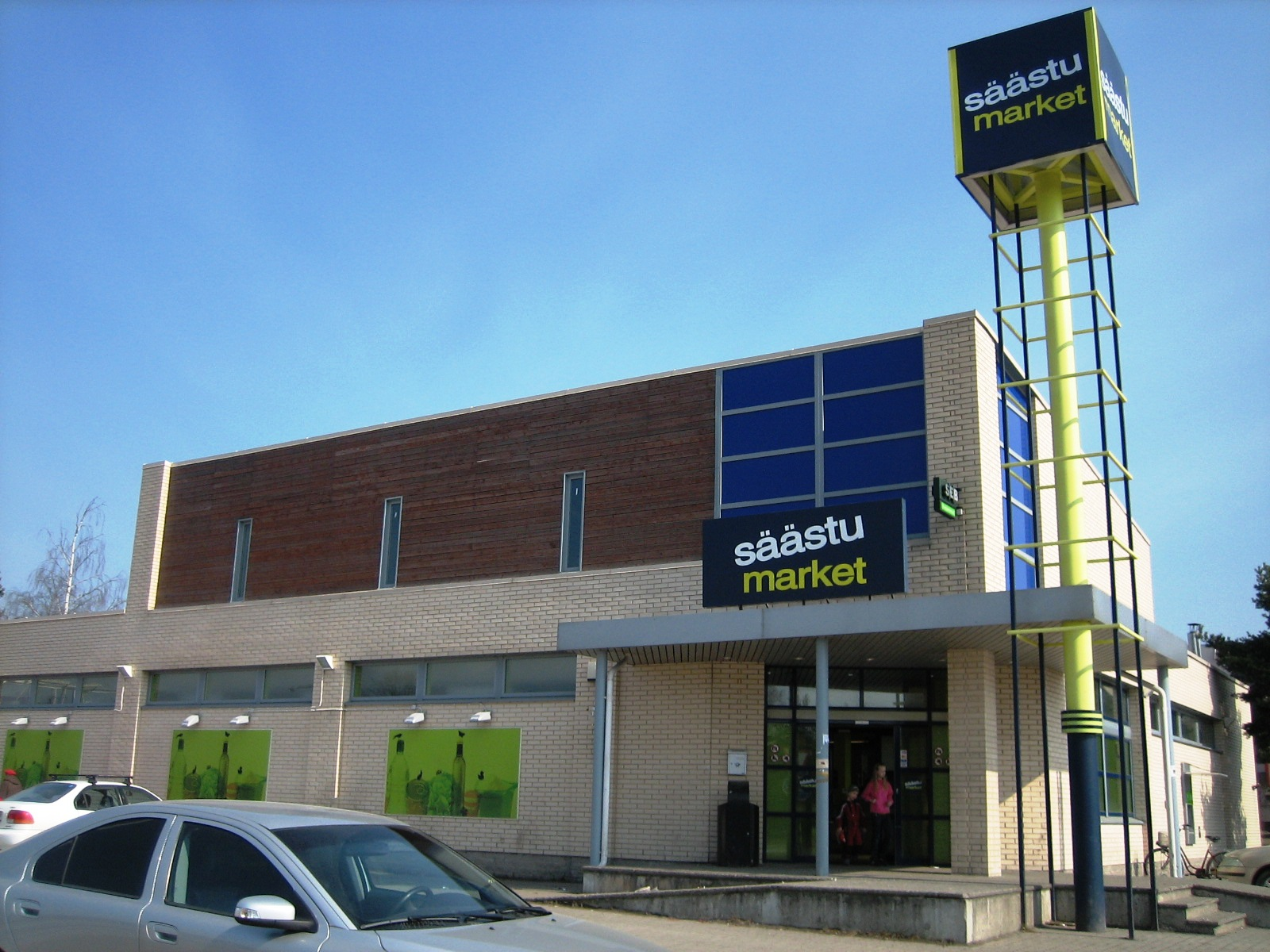
Laagri Säästumarketet in Vana-Pääsküla (Old Pääsküla)

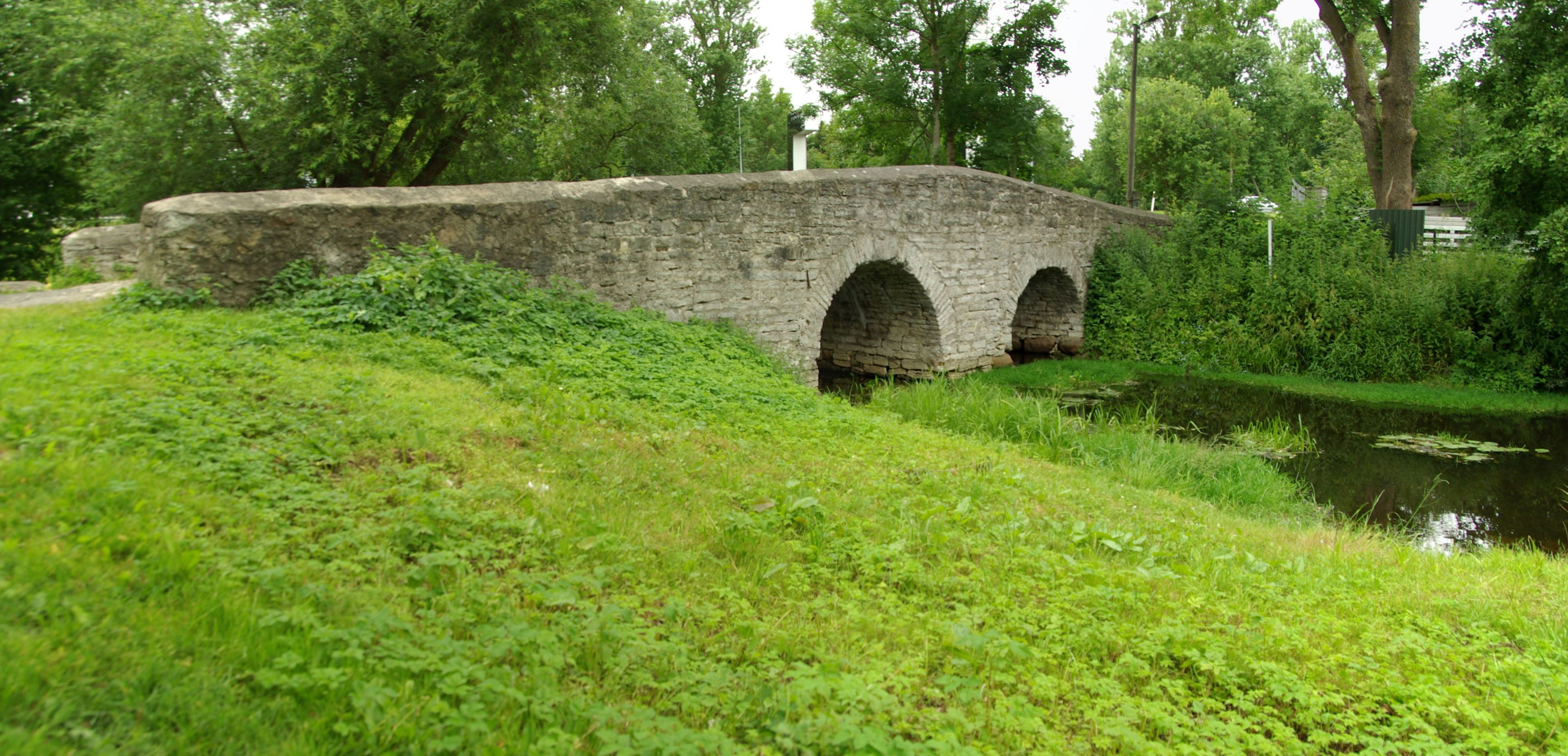
Pääsküla Stone Bridge

Preceding station	Elron	Following station
Kivimäe towards Tallinn	Tallinn–Turba/Paldiski	Laagri towards Turba, Kloogaranna or Paldiski
