= Urda railway station =

Railway station in Harju County, Estonia

Urda
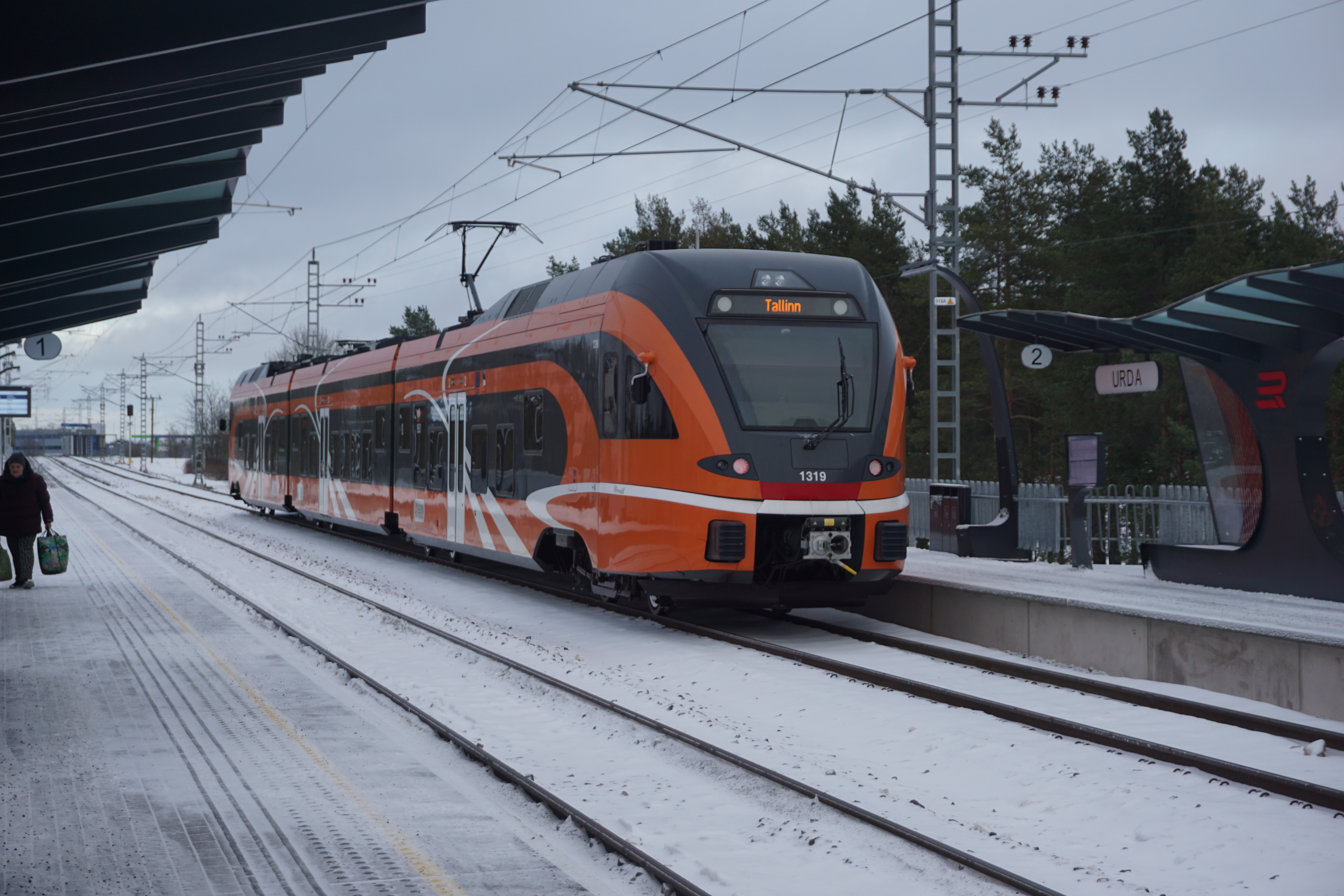
- Urda railway station in 2022

General information
- Location: Laagri, Saue Parish, Harju County; Estonia
- Coordinates: 59.343564°N 24.612164°E
- System: railway station
- Owner: Eesti Raudtee (EVR)
- Platforms: 2
- Tracks: 2
- Train operators: Elron
- Connections: Regional Buses L1 112

Other information
- Fare zone: II

History
- Opened: 2008

Services
Preceding station	Elron	Following station
Laagri towards Tallinn	Tallinn–Turba/Paldiski	Padula towards Turba, Kloogaranna or Paldiski
Location

Urda railway station (Estonian: Urda raudteepeatus) is a railway station serving the southern part of the Laagri borough of Saue parish in Harju County in northern Estonia.

The Urda railway station is located on the Tallinn-Keila railway line, between Laagri and Padula railway stations and approximately 15 kilometers (8 mi) southwest from the Baltic station (Estonian: Balti jaam) which is the main railway station of Tallinn. The station was officially opened in 2008.

In 2022 the second track through Urda station was completed, and the station now has two 150 meters long platforms. Elron's electric trains from Tallinn to Keila, Paldiski, Turba and Klooga-Rand stop at Urda station.

In 2026, there are approximately 50 train departures per day at Urda railway station towards Tallinn.

== See also ==
- List of railway stations in Estonia
- Rail transport in Estonia
