= Kivimäe railway station =

Railway station in Tallinn, Estonia

Kivimäe
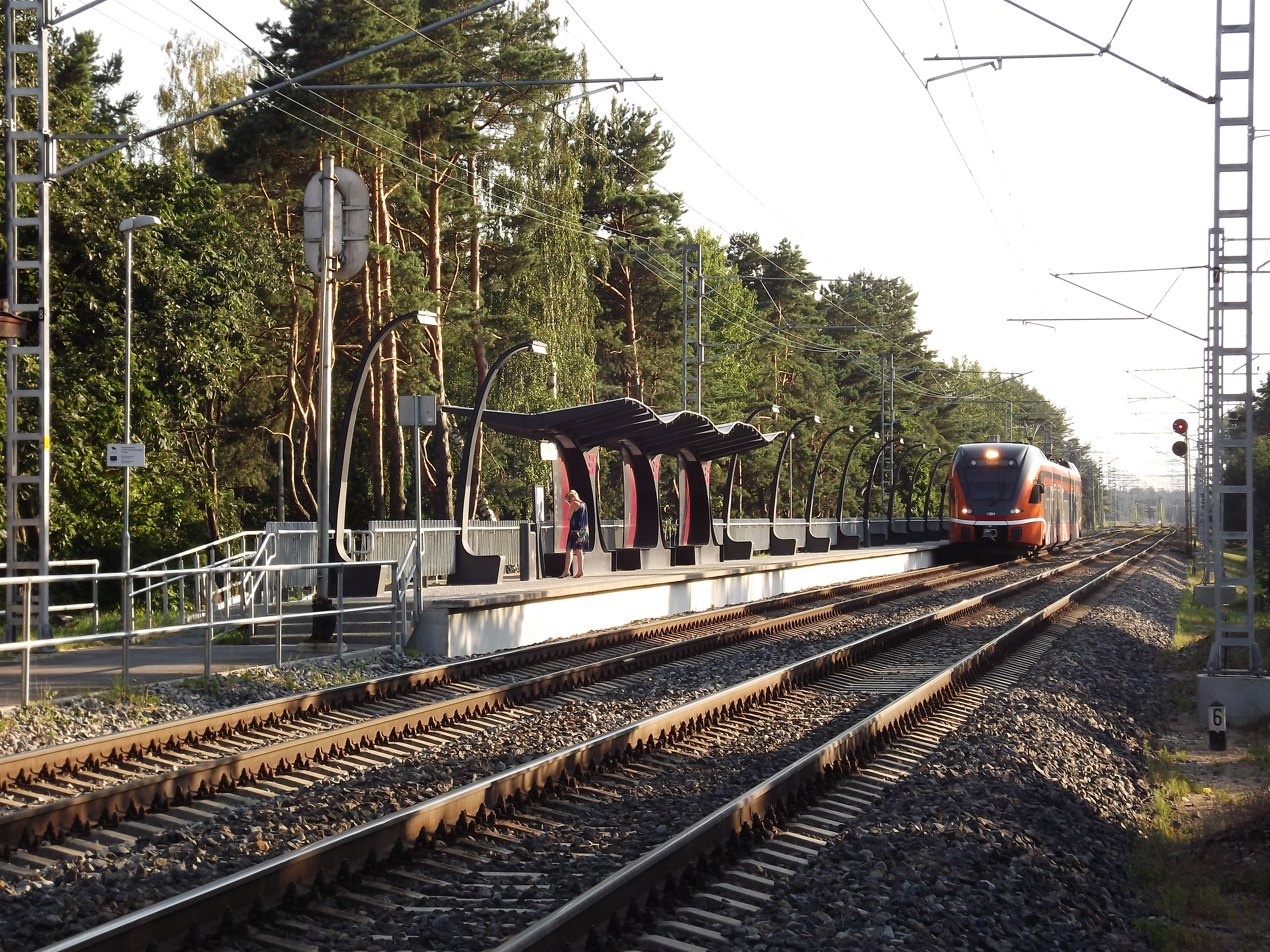
- Kivimäe railway station in 2014

General information
- Location: Kivimäe, Nõmme, Tallinn, Harju County; Estonia
- Coordinates: 59.3770°N 24.6563°E
- System: railway station
- Owner: Eesti Raudtee (EVR)
- Platforms: 2
- Tracks: 2
- Train operators: Elron
- Connections: Buses 27 96

Construction
- Accessible: Yes

Other information
- Fare zone: I

History
- Opened: 3 November 1924; 101 years ago
- Electrified: 1924

Services
Preceding station	Elron	Following station
Hiiu towards Tallinn	Tallinn–Turba/Paldiski	Pääsküla towards Turba, Kloogaranna or Paldiski
Location
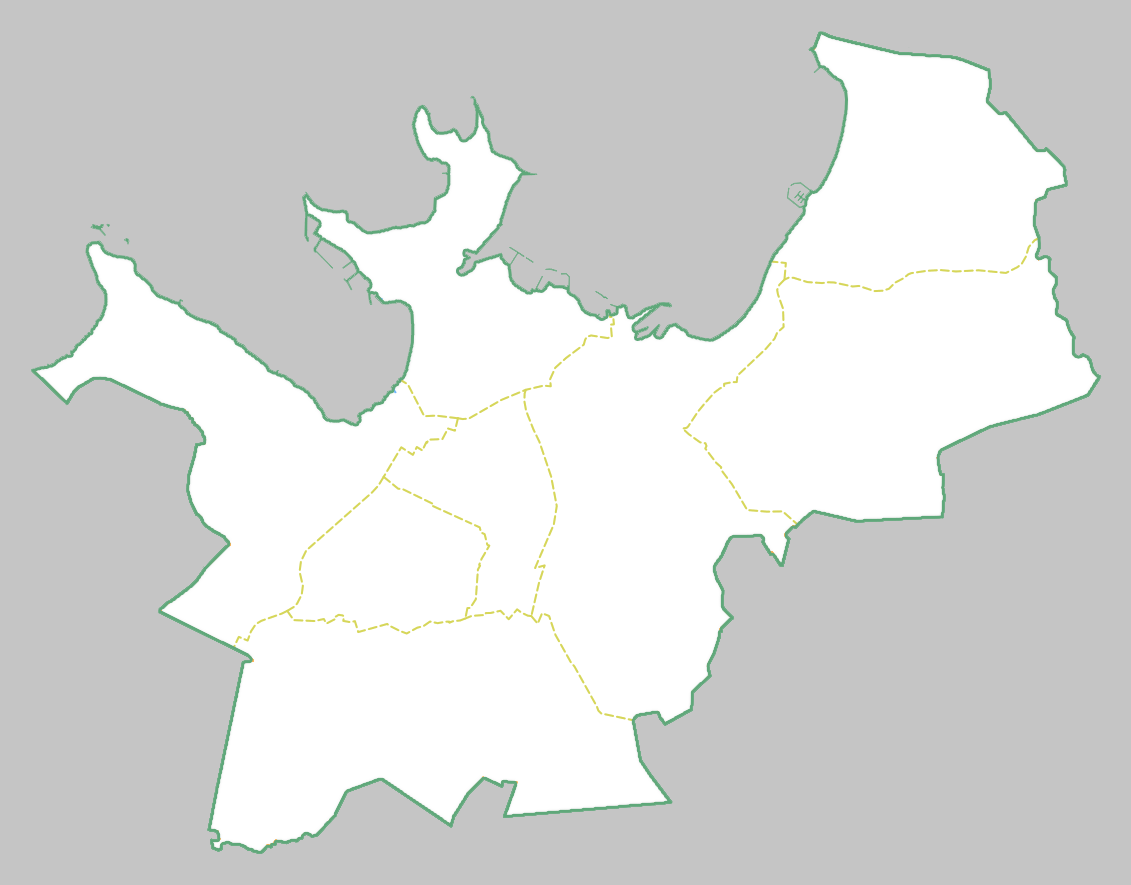
- Location within Estonia Location within Harju County Location within Tallinn

Kivimäe railway station (Estonian: Kivimäe raudteepeatus) is a railway station in the Nõmme district of Tallinn, Estonia. The station serves the Kivimäe sub-district which has approximately 4800 residents.

It is located approximately 10 kilometers (6,2 mi) southwest from the Baltic station (Estonian: Balti jaam) which is the main railway station of Tallinn, near the Baltic Sea. The Kivimäe railway station is located between Hiiu and Pääsküla railway stations of Tallinn-Keila railway. The station was opened on November 3, 1924.

There are two platforms along the two-track railway, 133 and 146 meters long. Elron's electric trains from Tallinn to Keila, Paldiski, Turba and Klooga-Rand stop at Kivimäe station. The station is in Zone I, within which traffic is free for Tallinners.

There is a possibility to transfer to bus line 27 and the night bus 96 northwest of the railway station on Pärnu maantee.

In 1937 a station building was completed from silicate bricks according to the project of Hendrik Otlood, which in 1997 was declared a cultural monument.

Ticket sales in the station building ended in 1998.

In 2020, there were approximately 58 train departures per day at Kivimäe railway station towards Tallinn city center.

== See also ==
- List of railway stations in Estonia
- Rail transport in Estonia
- Public transport in Tallinn
