= Hiiu railway station =

Railway station in Tallinn, Estonia

Hiiu
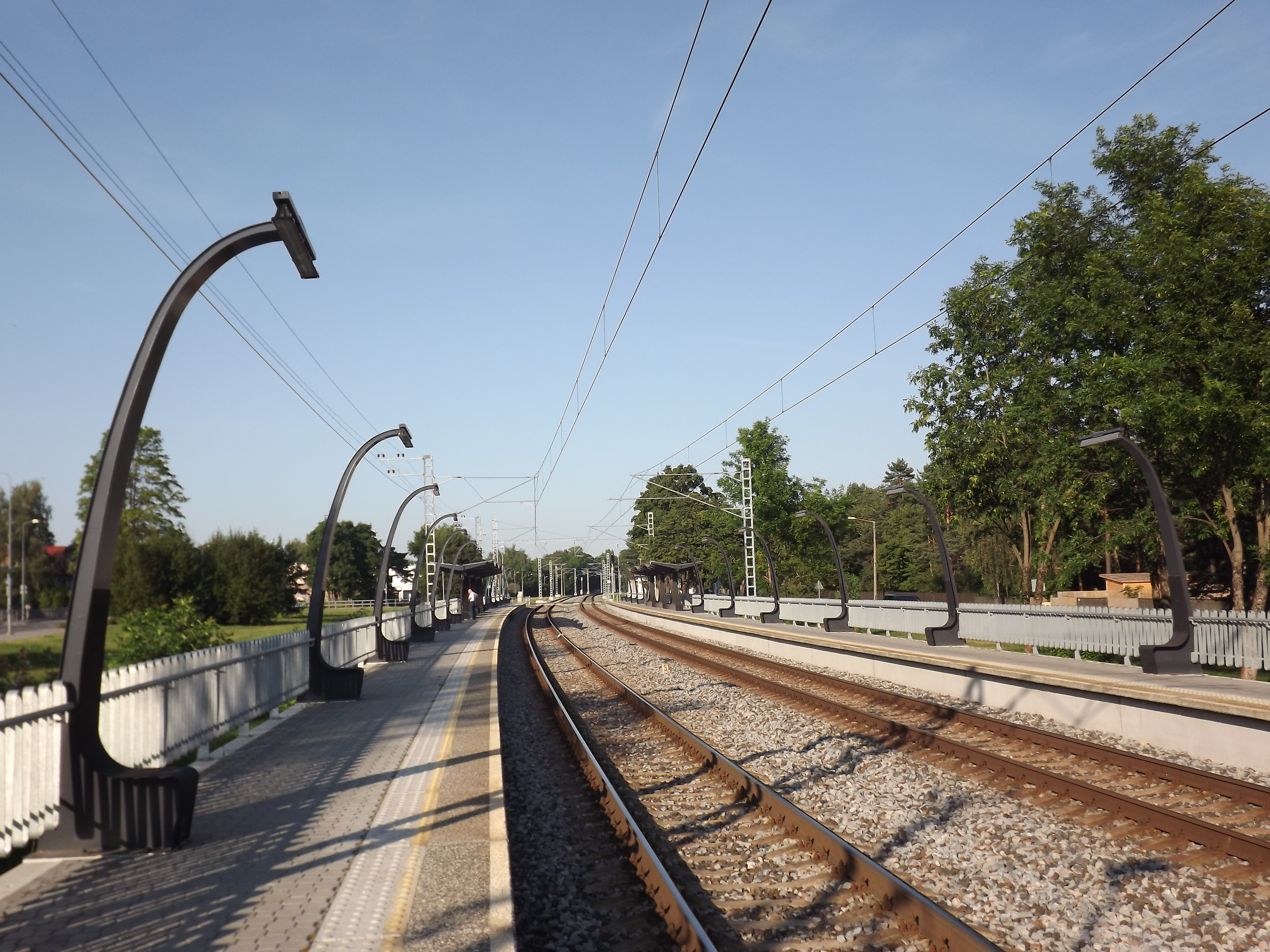
- Hiiu railway station in 2014

General information
- Location: Hiiu, Nõmme, Tallinn, Harju County; Estonia
- Coordinates: 59.3830°N 24.6702°E
- System: railway station
- Owner: Eesti Raudtee (EVR)
- Platforms: 2
- Tracks: 2
- Train operators: Elron
- Connections: Buses 10 27 33

Construction
- Structure type: at-grade
- Accessible: Yes

Other information
- Fare zone: I

History
- Opened: 1926
- Electrified: 3 kV DC OHLE
- Former names: Nõmme-Väike

Services
| Preceding station | Elron | Following station |
|---|---|---|
| Nõmme towards Tallinn | Tallinn–Turba/Paldiski | Kivimäe towards Turba, Kloogaranna or Paldiski |
Location
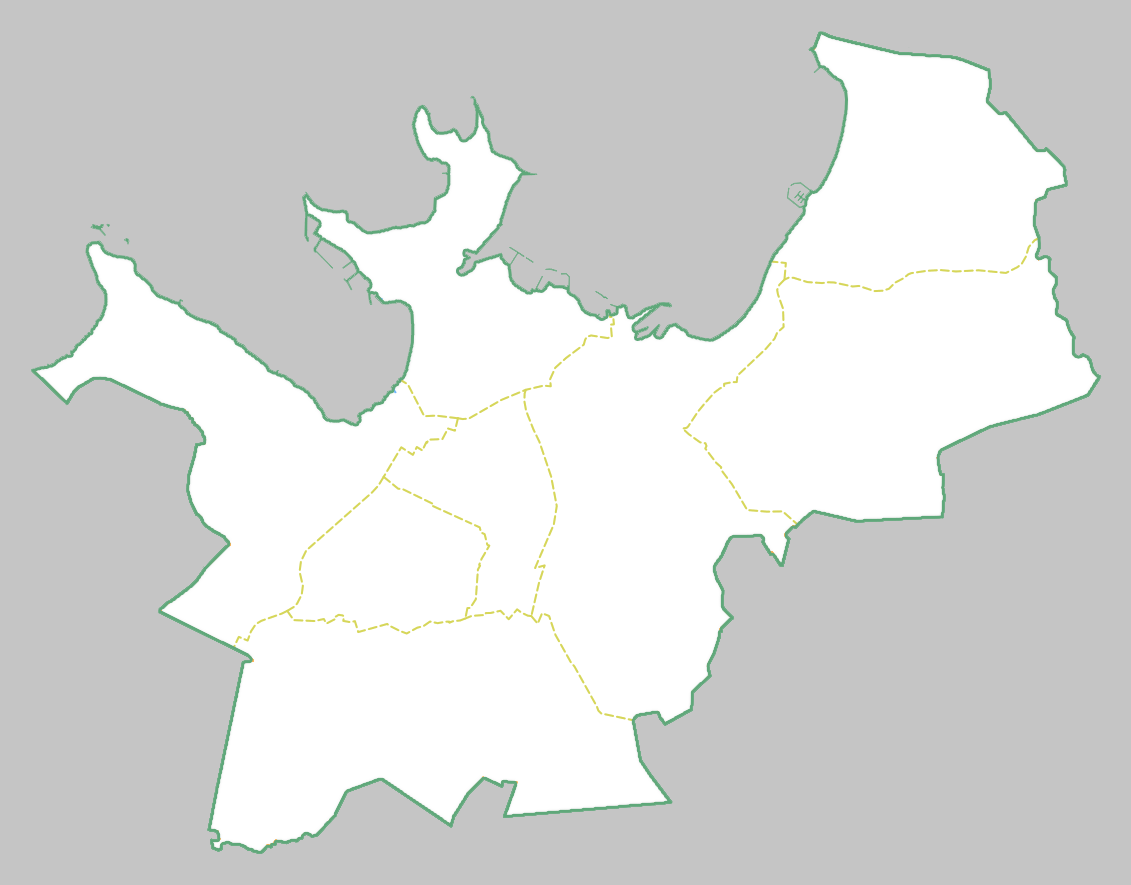
- Location within Estonia Location within Harju County Location within Tallinn

Hiiu railway station (Estonian: Hiiu raudteepeatus; previous name: Nõmme-Väike) is a railway station in the Nõmme district of Tallinn, Estonia. The station serves the Hiiu sub-district which has approximately 3900 residents. It is located approximately 9 kilometers (5,6 mi) southwest from the Baltic station (Estonian: Balti jaam) which is the main railway station of Tallinn, near the Baltic Sea. The Hiiu railway station is located between Nõmme and Kivimäe railway stations of Tallinn-Keila railway. The station was opened in 1926.

There are two platforms along the two-lane railway, both of which are 146 meters long. Elron's electric trains from Tallinn to Keila, Paldiski, Turba and Klooga-Rand stop at Hiiu station. The station belongs to the Zone I, within which traffic is free for Tallinners.

There is a possibility to transfer to TLT (Tallinn City Transport) bus lines 10, 27 at a nearby bus station on Pärnu maantee. Bus station for bus line 33 is located on Raudtee tänav and Hiiu tänav.

In 1929, a station building made of oil shale ash bricks and with a sloping roof was completed, where in 1932 the postal agency also moved. Ticket sales were terminated at the station building in the spring of 1998. In 1997, the building was declared an architectural monument.

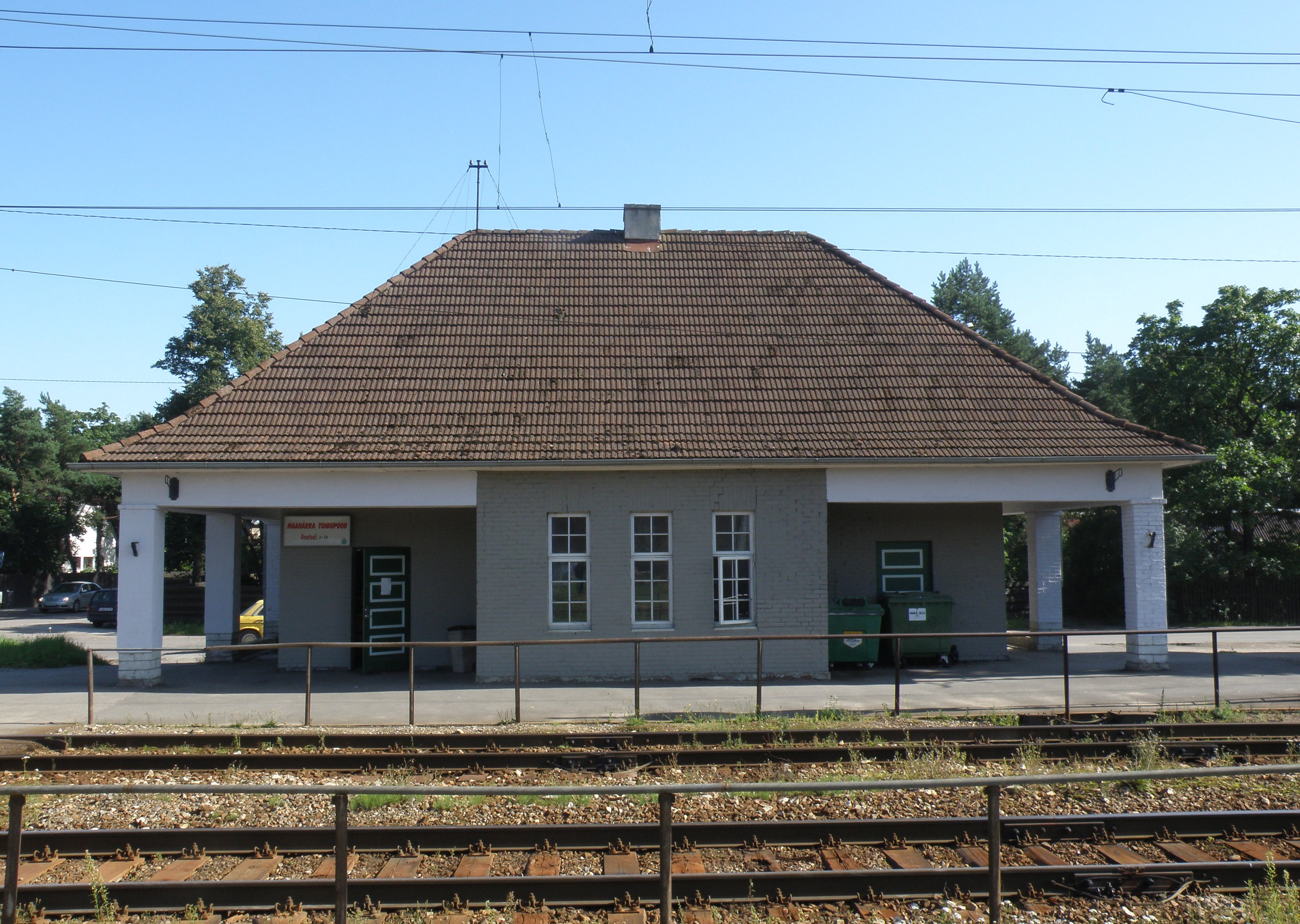
Hiiu station's historical building

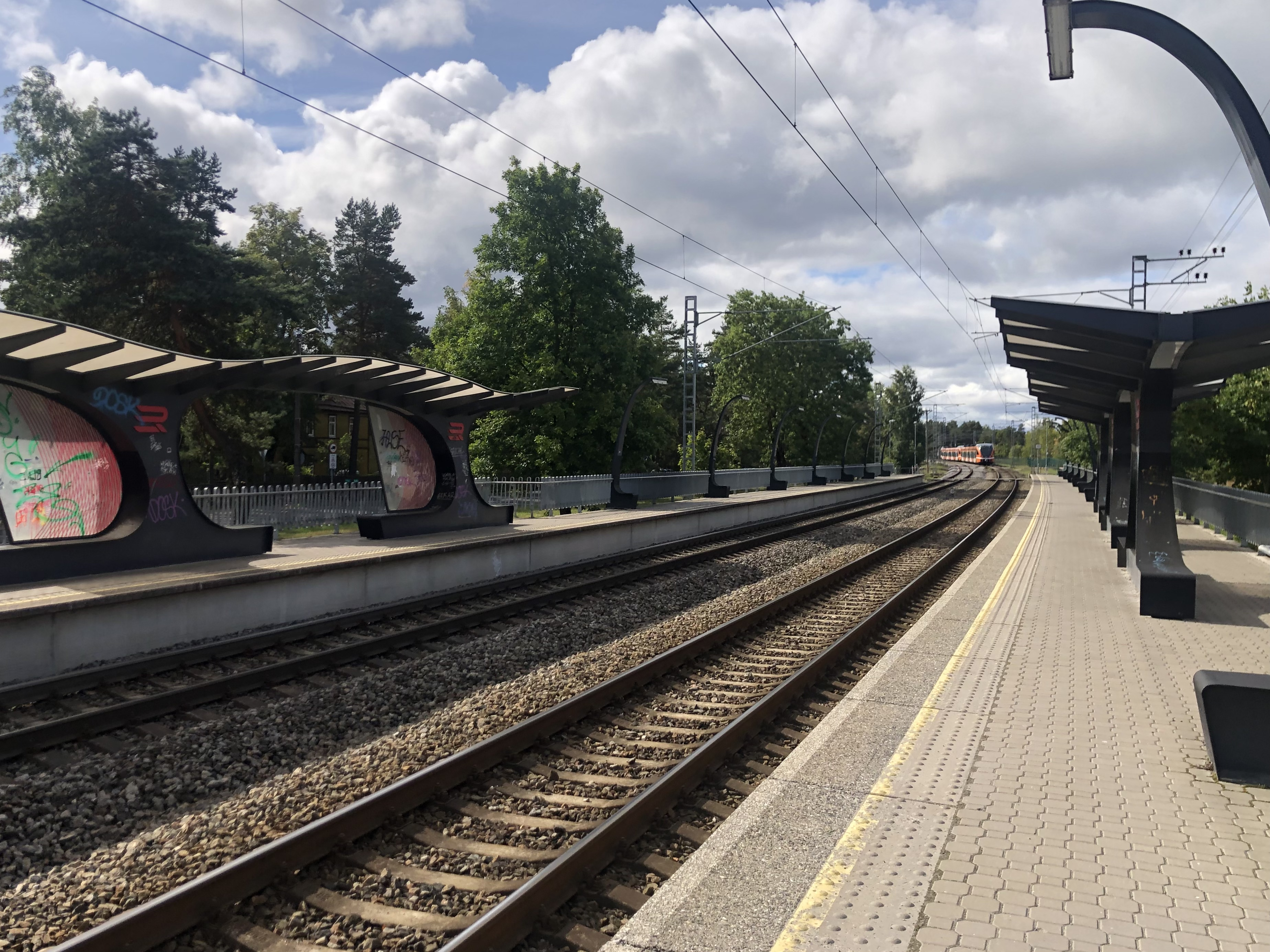
Platforms of Hiiu train station in September 2022. The commuter train to Paldiski is leaving the station

In 2020, there were approximately 58 train departures per day at Hiiu railway station towards Tallinn city center.

== See also ==
- List of railway stations in Estonia
- Rail transport in Estonia
- Public transport in Tallinn
