= Pääsküla (river) =

River in Estonia

Pääsküla River
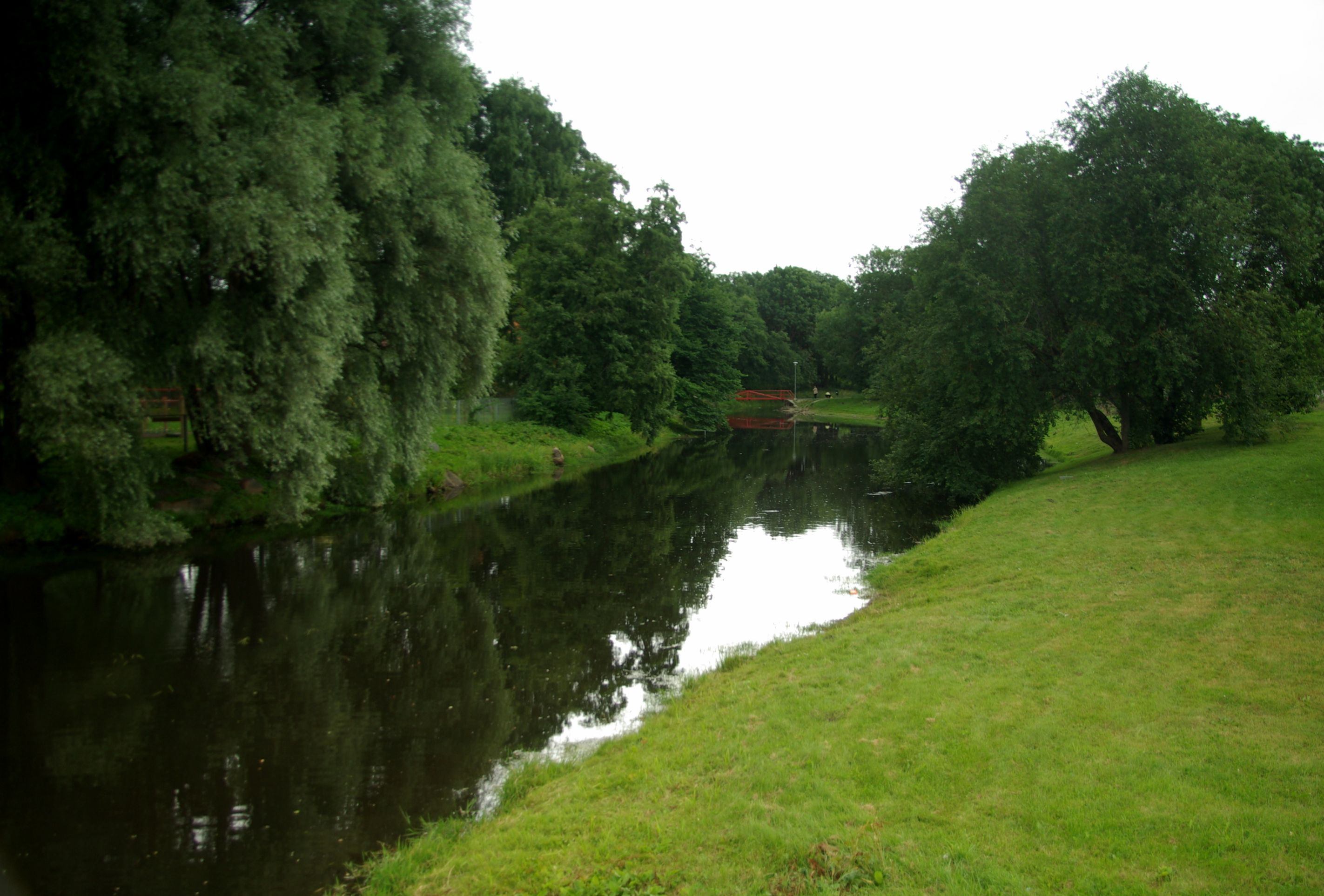
- The Pääsküla River in Laagri

Location
- Country: Estonia

Physical characteristics
- Mouth: Vääna River
  - coordinates: 59°21′25″N 24°34′17″E
- Length: 11.6 km
- Basin size: 41.2 km^{2}

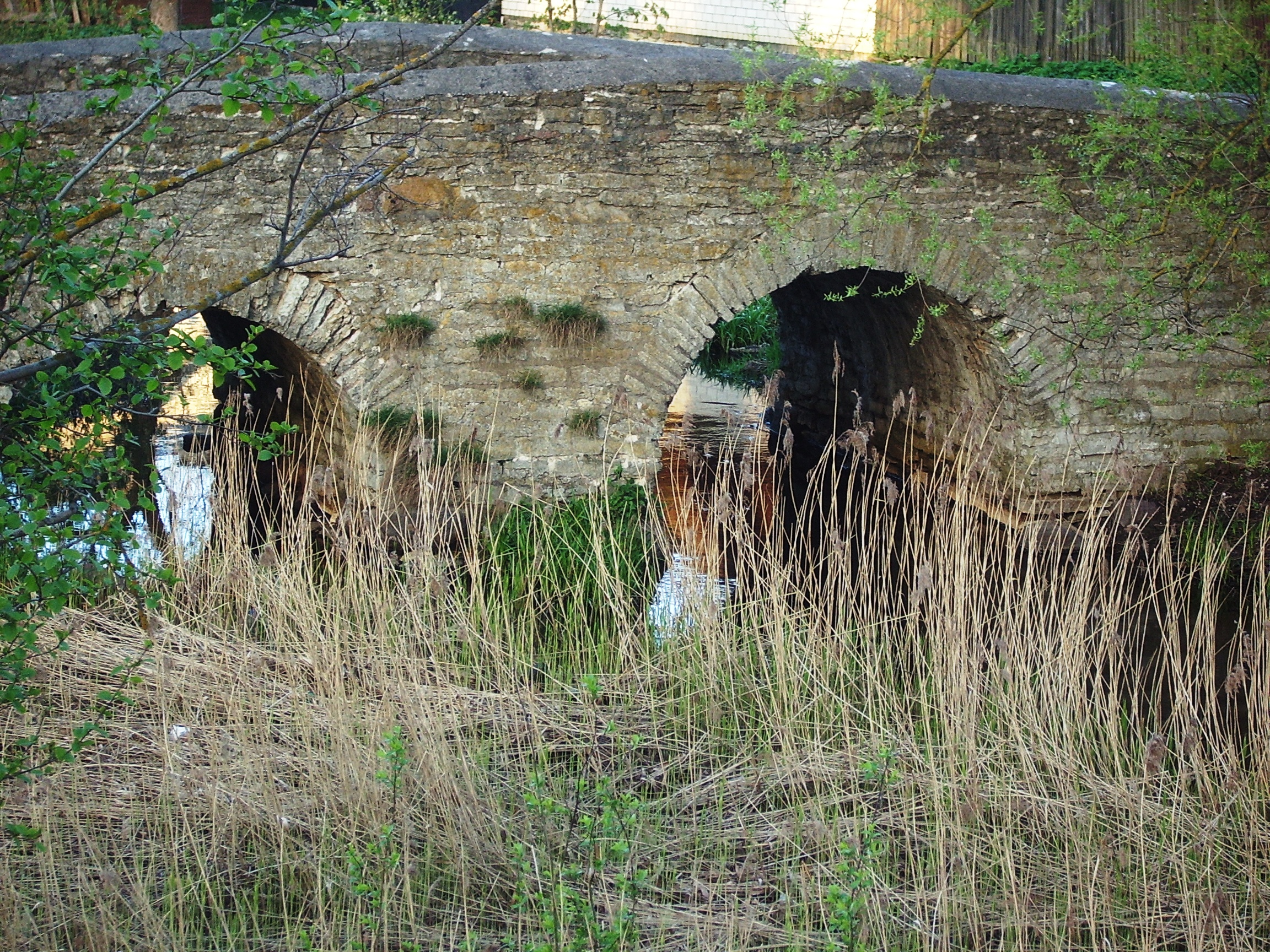
The Pääsküla Stone Bridge over the river

The Pääsküla River is a river in Estonia in Harju County. The river is 11.6 km long, and its basin size is 41.2 km^{2}. It discharges into the Vääna River.

The Pääsküla Stone Bridge was built over the river in the 1860s. The bridge has been designated a cultural heritage object of Estonia.
