= Laagri =

Borough in Estonia

- Small borough
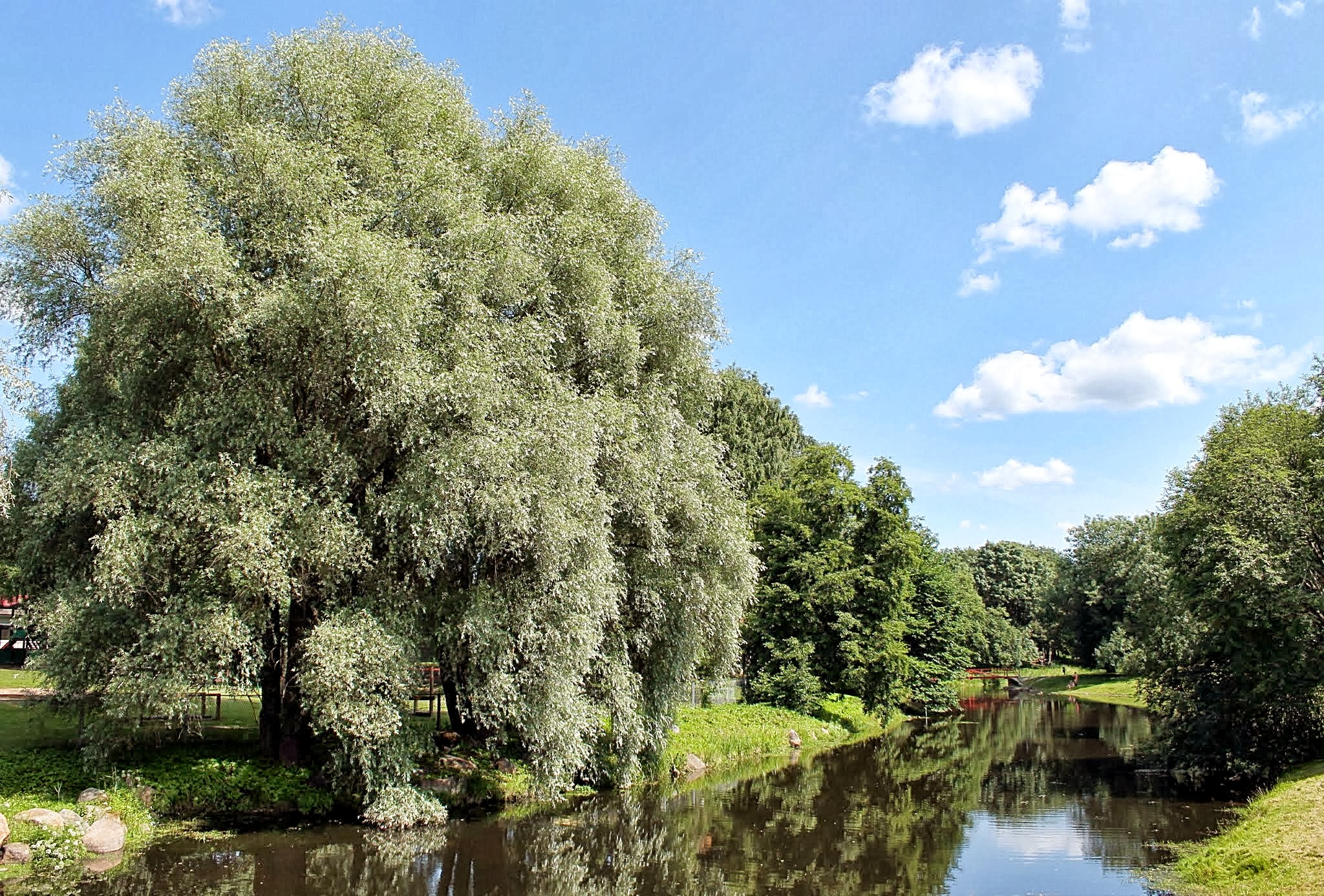
- Pääsküla River in Laagri

- Location in Estonia
- Coordinates: 59°21′04″N 24°37′05″E
- Country: Estonia
- County: Harju County
- Municipality: Saue Parish

Population (1 January 2025)
  - Total: 6,017

Laagri is a small borough (Estonian: alevik) in Harju County, northern Estonia. It is located in Saue Parish. As of 1 January 2025, the settlement's population is 6,017.

It is served by the Laagri railway stop on the Tallinn-Turba line, Elron's western route which also serves the Laagri subdistrict of Nõmme.

== Gallery ==
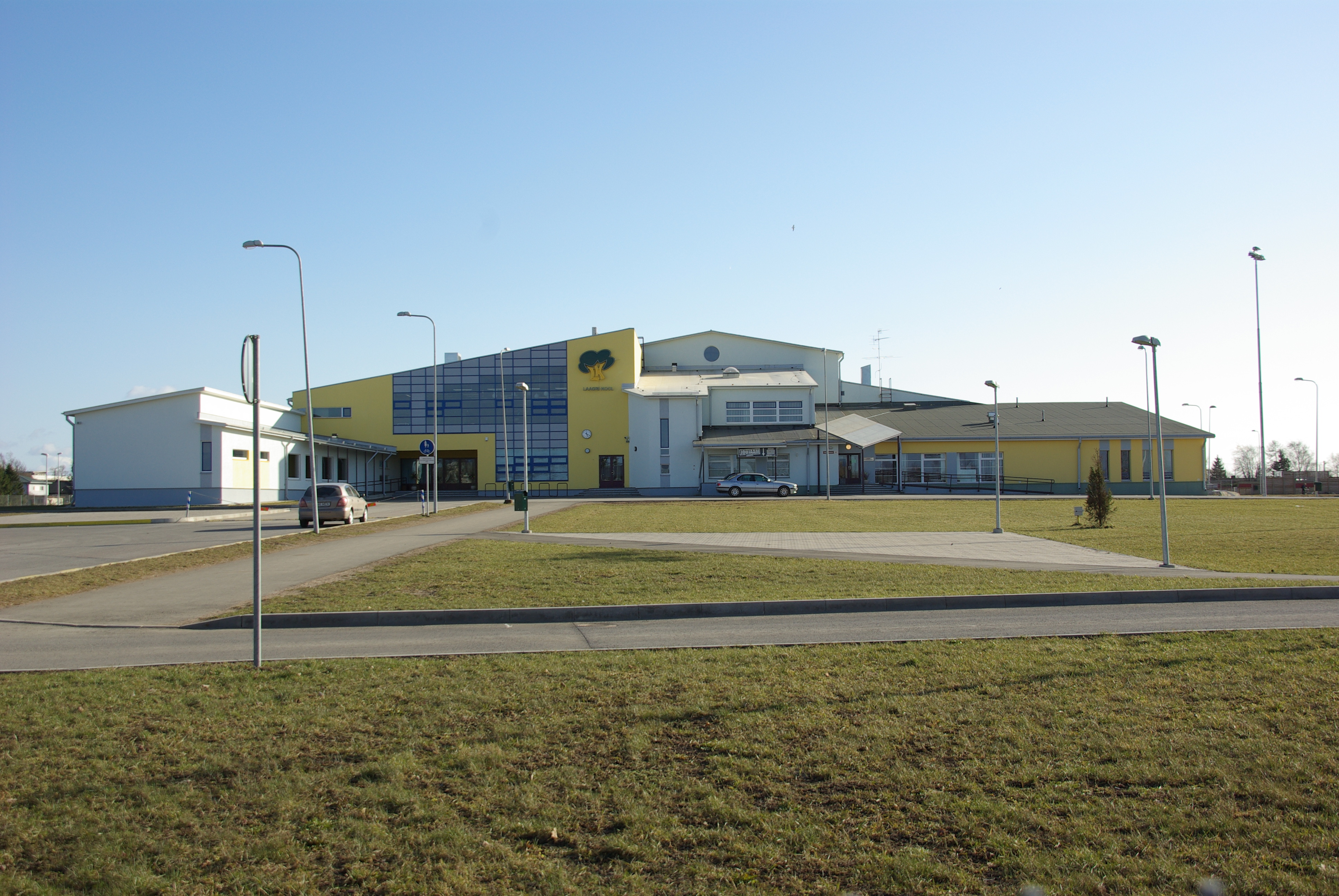
Laagri school

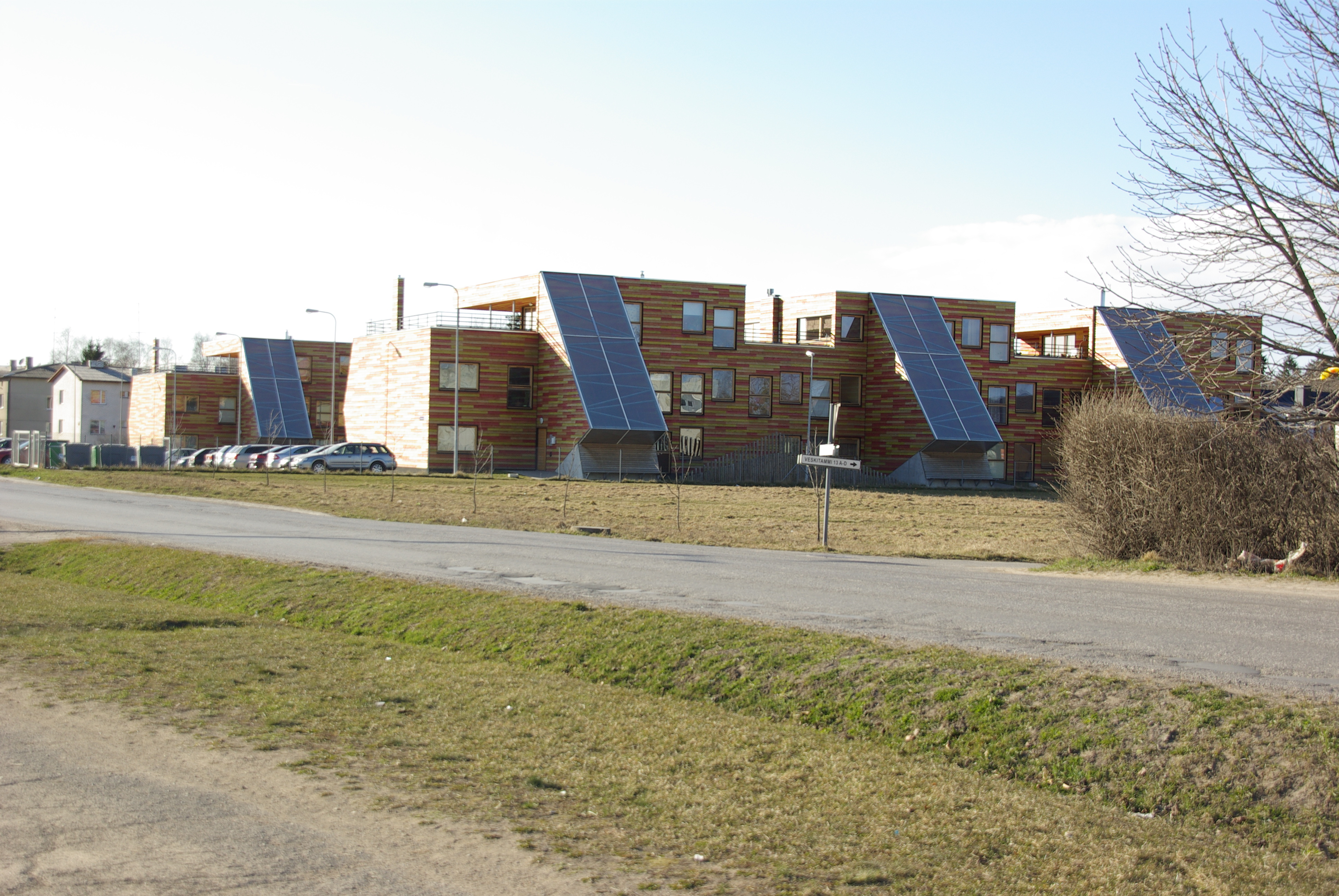
Apartment buildings in Laagri

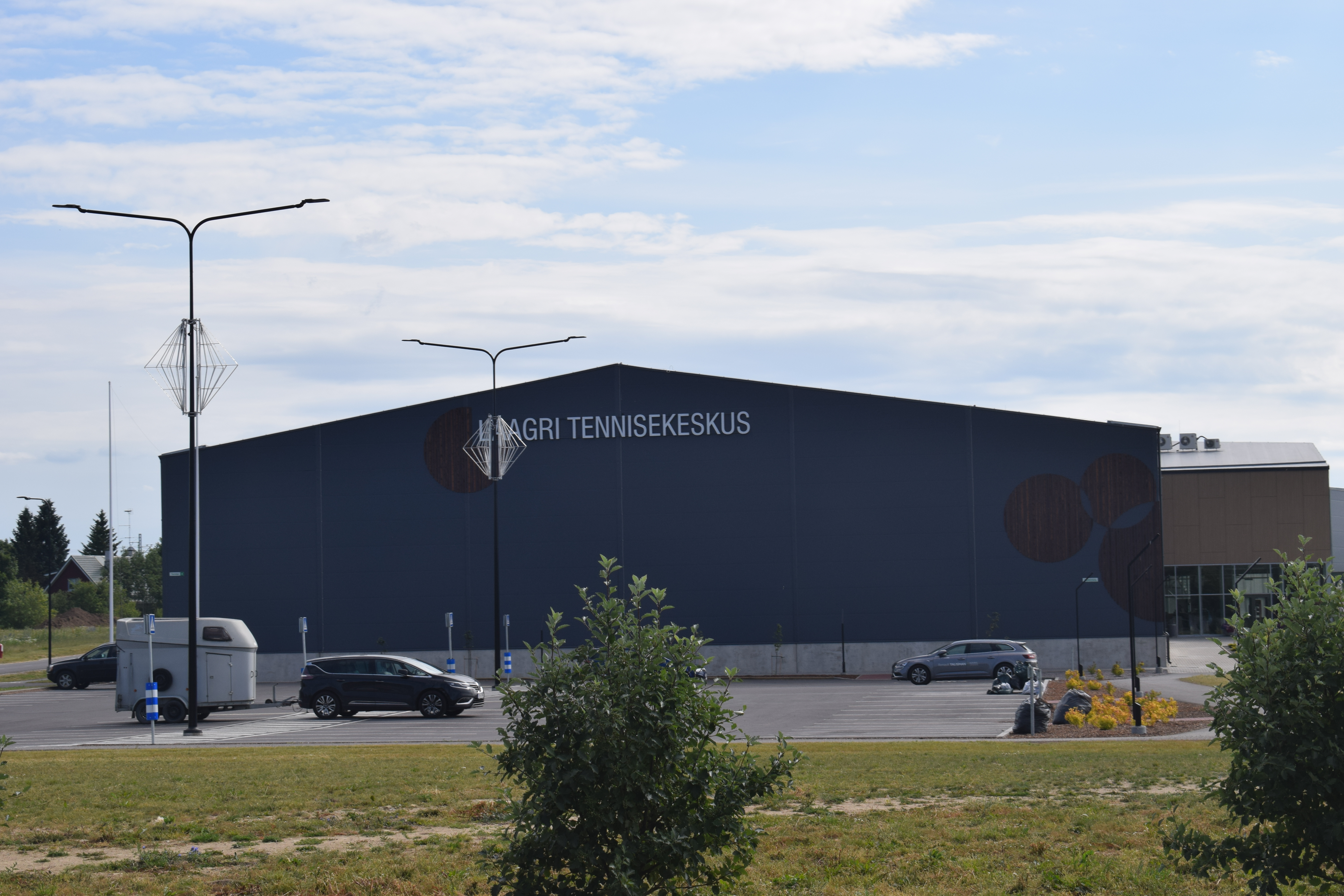
Laagri tennis center
