= Pääsküla railway station =

Railway station in Tallinn, Estonia

Pääsküla
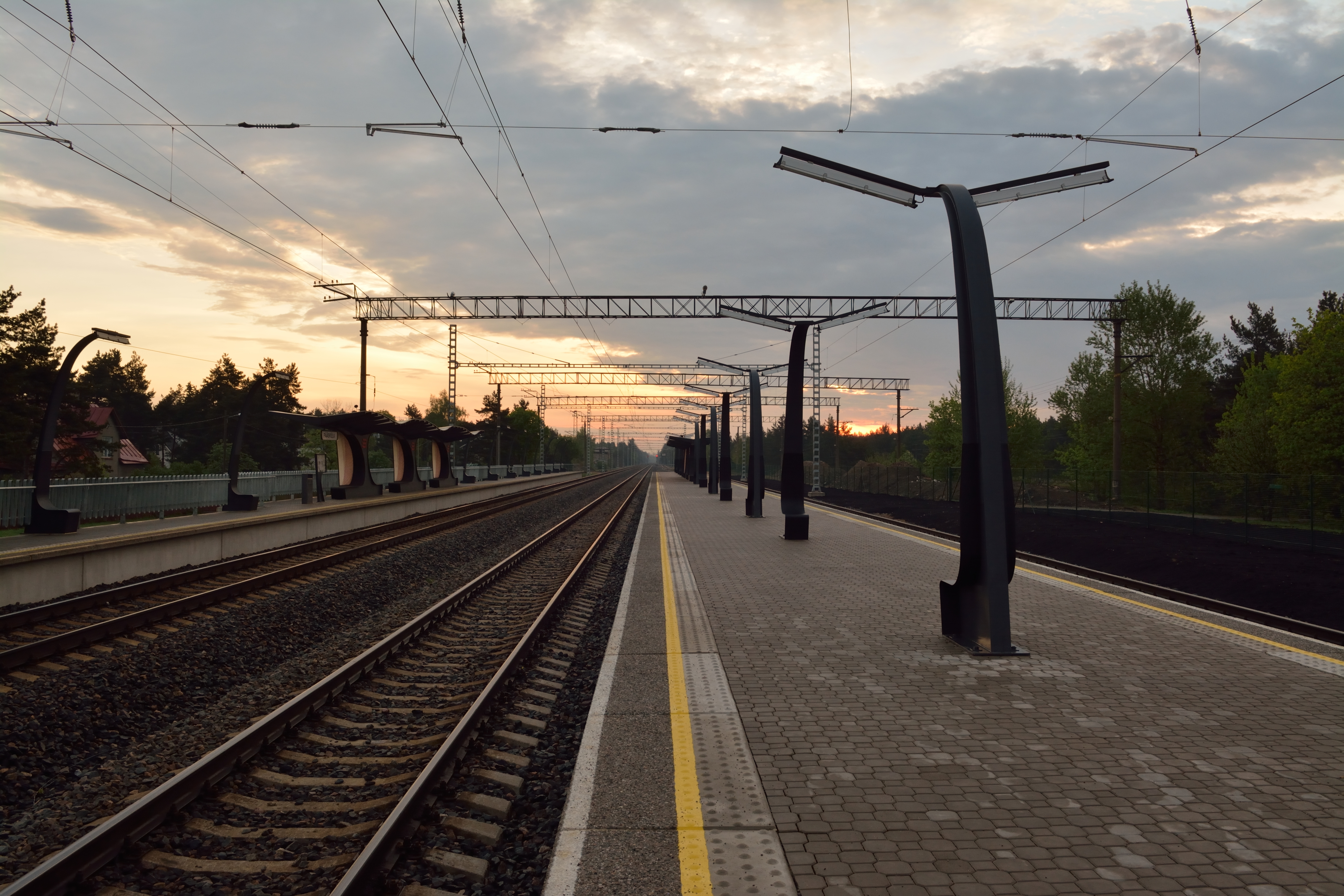
- Pääsküla railway station in 2013

General information
- Location: Pääsküla, Nõmme, Tallinn; Harju County; Estonia
- Coordinates: 59.368972°N 24.640194°E
- System: railway station
- Owner: Eesti Raudtee (EVR)
- Platforms: 2
- Tracks: 4
- Train operators: Elron
- Connections: Buses 27 96; Regional Buses 163

Construction
- Accessible: Yes

Other information
- Fare zone: I

History
- Opened: 1915; 111 years ago
- Electrified: 1924

Services
Preceding station	Elron	Following station
Kivimäe towards Tallinn	Tallinn–Turba/Paldiski	Laagri towards Turba, Kloogaranna or Paldiski
Location
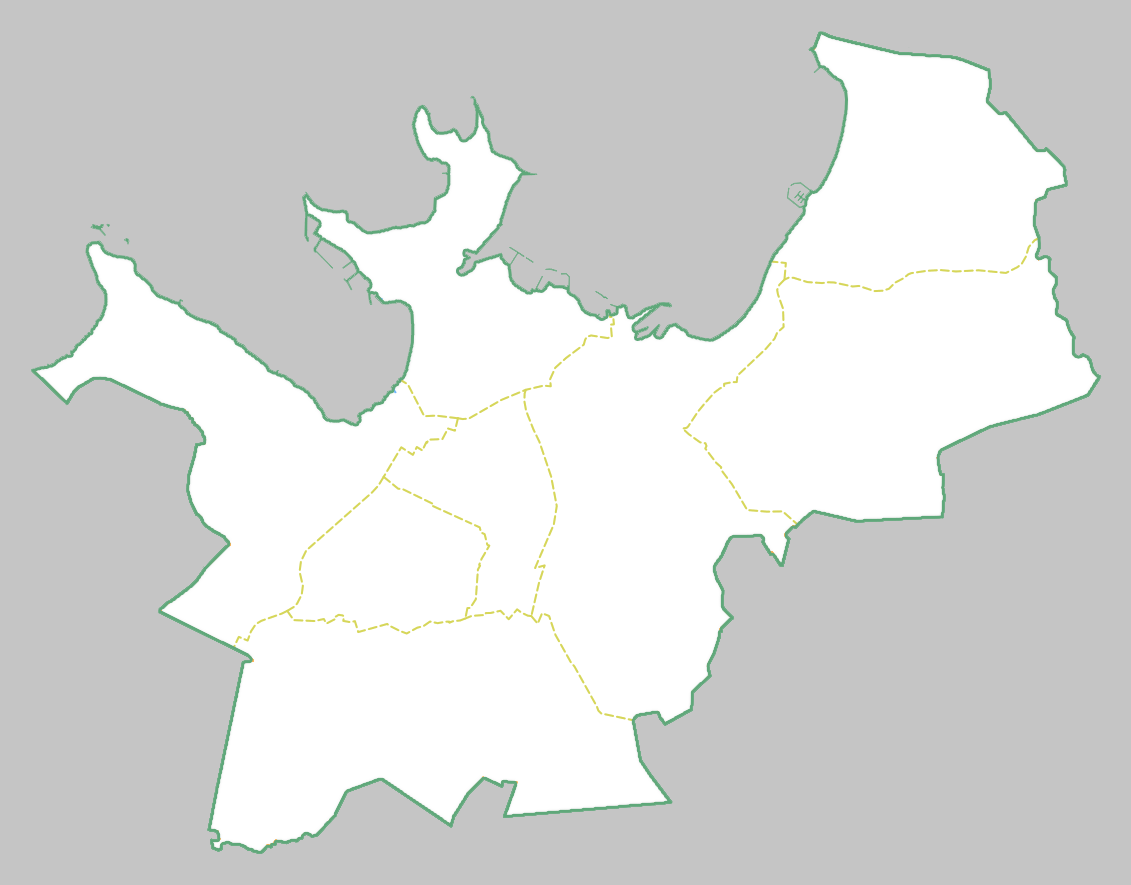
- Location within Estonia Location within Harju County Location within Tallinn

Pääsküla station (Estonian: Pääsküla raudteepeatus, previous Russian name was Petrovskaja Sloboda until 1919) is a railway station in Pääsküla in Nõmme district of Tallinn, Estonia, approximately 11 kilometers (6,8 mi) southwest from the Baltic station (Estonian: Balti jaam) which is the main railway station of Tallinn, near the Baltic Sea. The Pääsküla railway station is located between Kivimäe and Laagri railway stops of Tallinn-Keila railway. The station was opened in 1915.

There are two platforms along the three-lane railway, both 150 meters long. Elron's electric trains from Tallinn to Keila, Paldiski, Turba and Klooga-Rand stop at Pääsküla station. The station belongs to the Zone I, within which traffic is free for Tallinners.

The main railway depot of Estonia is located nearby the Pääsküla station.

Pääsküla railway station serves the Pääsküla sub-district which has approximately 9800 residents.

There is a possibility to transfer to bus line 27 and 20 at nearby bus station on Pärnu maantee. Bus station for bus line 14, 18 and 18A is about 500 meters from the Pääsküla railway station on Vabaduse puiestee.

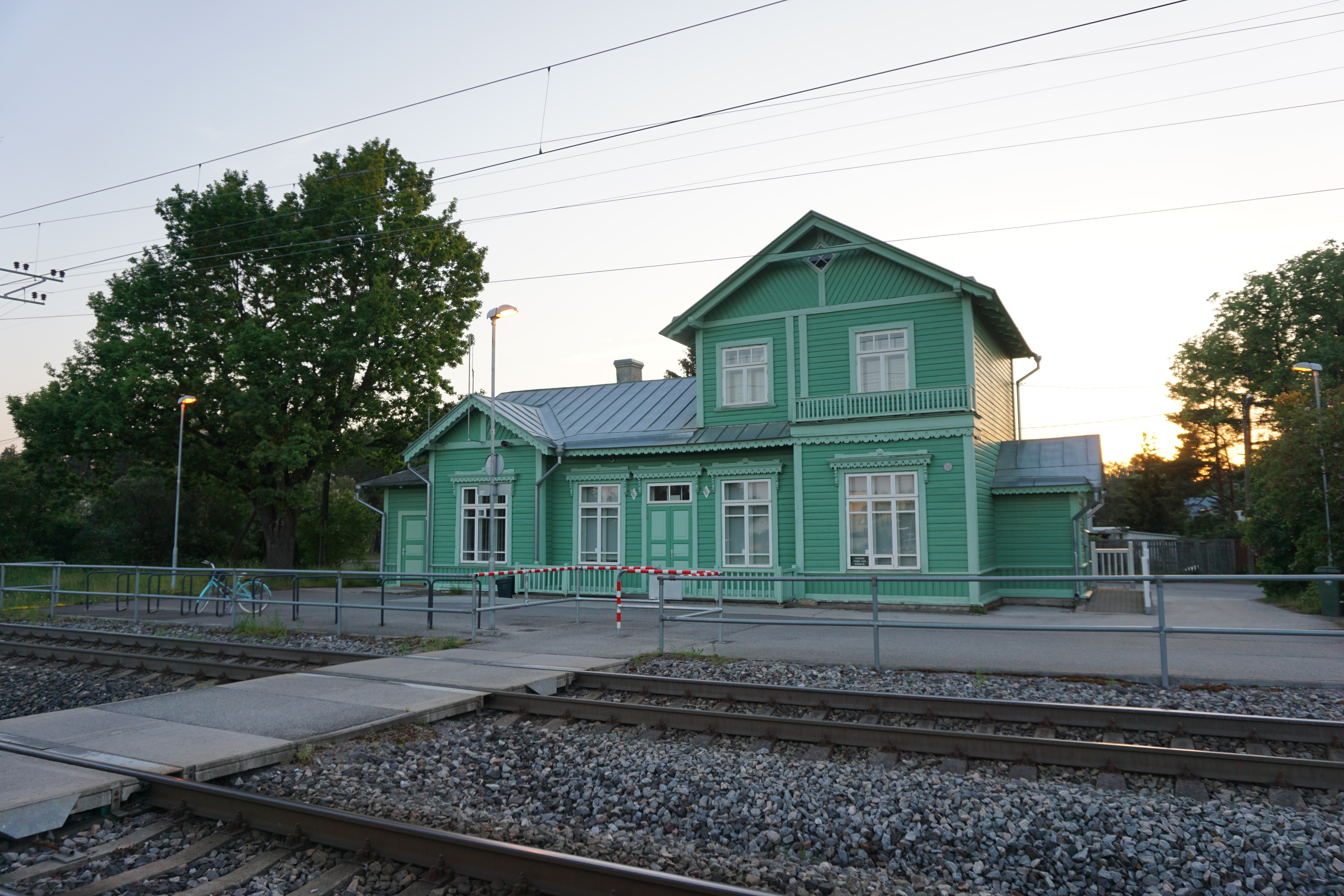
Pääsküla railway station's building from 1916 and 1926 (first storey)

In 1916 a wooden station building was completed and the first story of the building was added in 1926.

Ticket sales in the station building ended in 1997.

In 2020, there were approximately 58 train departures per day at Pääsküla railway station towards Tallinn city center.

== See also ==
- List of railway stations in Estonia
- Rail transport in Estonia
- Public transport in Tallinn
