= Maidla Parish =

Former municipality of Estonia

Coordinates: 59°18′N 27°1′E

Maidla Parish Maidla vald
- Former municipality of Estonia
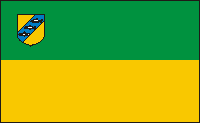
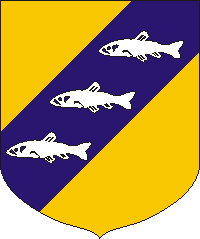
- Flag Coat of arms

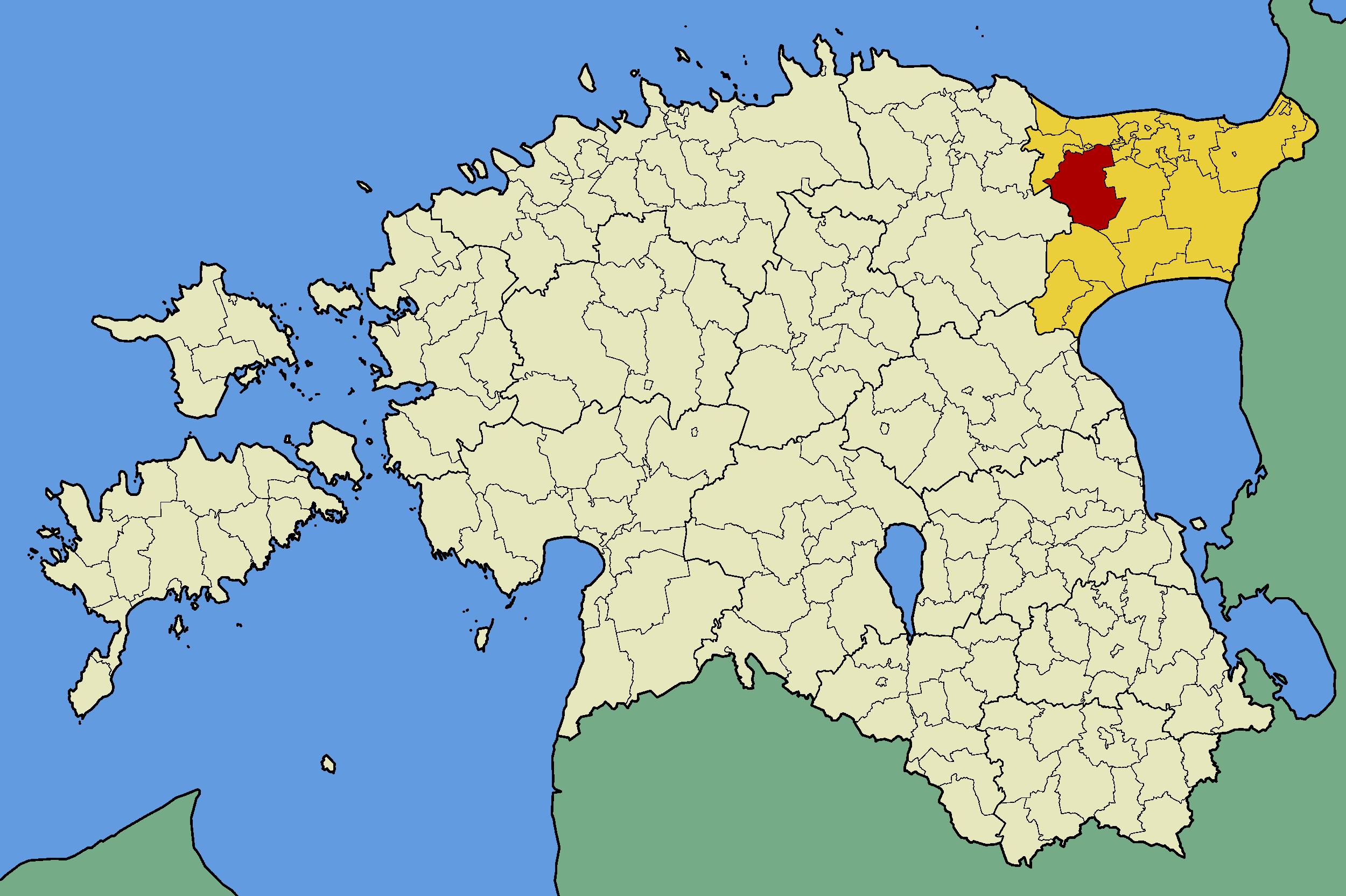
- Maidla Parish within Ida-Viru County in 2009.
- Country: Estonia
- County: Ida-Viru County
- Administrative centre: Savala

Area
  - Total: 332.3 km^{2} (128.3 sq mi)

Population (2004)
  - Total: 772
  - Density: 2.32/km^{2} (6.02/sq mi)
- Website: www.maidlavv.ee

Maidla Parish (Estonian: Maidla vald) was an Estonian municipality located in Ida-Viru County.

In October 2013, Maidla Parish along with the town of Püssi were merged into Lüganuse Parish, and therefore ceased to exist as sovereign municipalities.

In 2004 Maidla Parish had a population of 772 and an area of 332.3 km².

== Villages ==
In 2013, Maidla Parish had 27 villages: Aidu, Aidu-Liiva, Aidu-Nõmme, Aidu-Sooküla, Aruküla, Arupäälse, Aruvälja, Hirmuse, Koolma, Kulja, Lipu, Lümatu, Maidla, Mehide, Oandu, Ojamaa, Piilse, Rebu, Rääsa, Salaküla, Savala, Sirtsi, Soonurme, Tarumaa, Uniküla, Veneoja and Virunurme.
