= Sonda Parish =

Former municipality of Estonia

Coordinates: 59°20′N 26°50′E

Sonda Parish Sonda vald
- Former municipality of Estonia
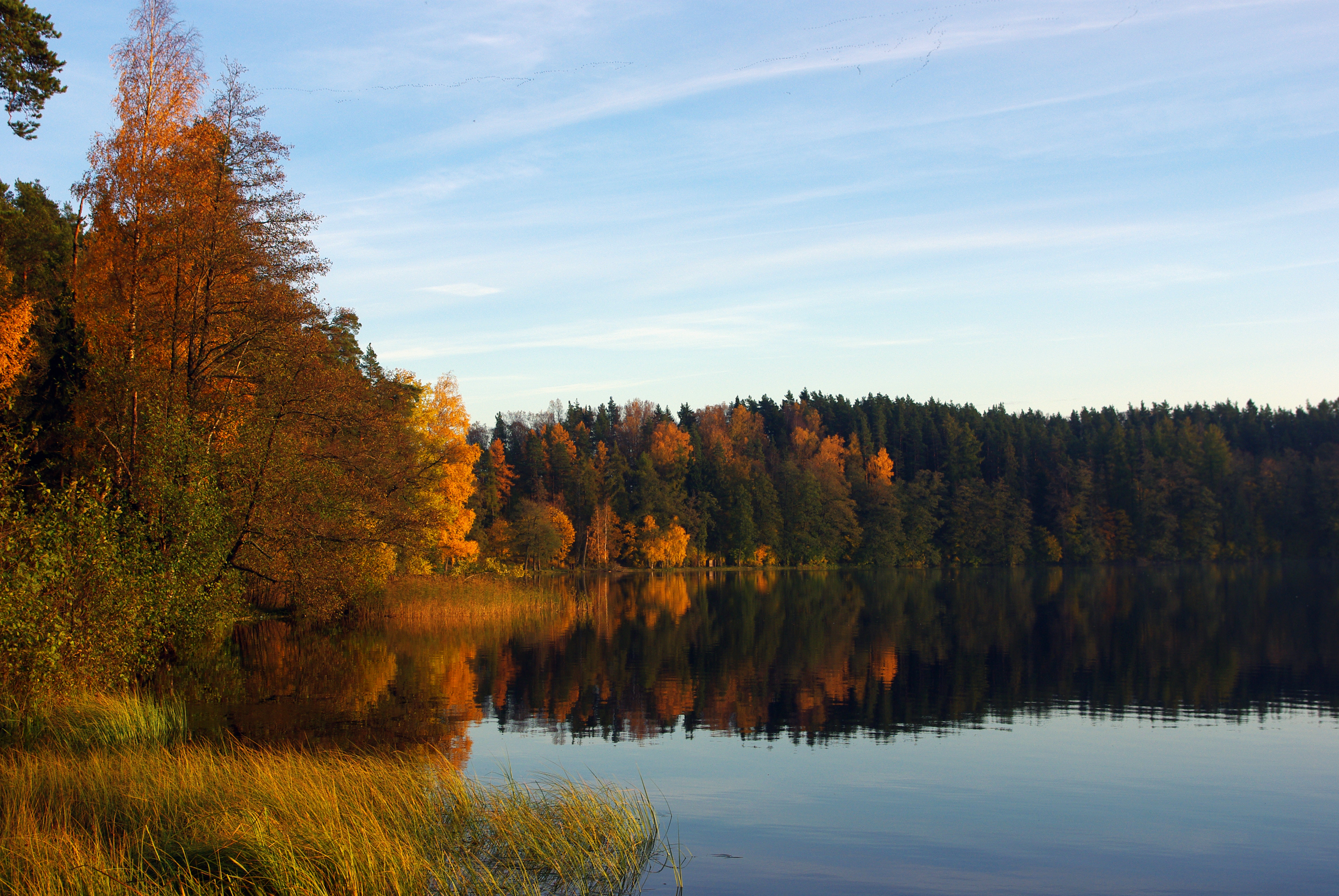
- Uljaste lake

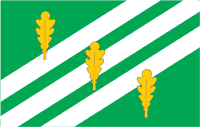
- Flag Coat of arms

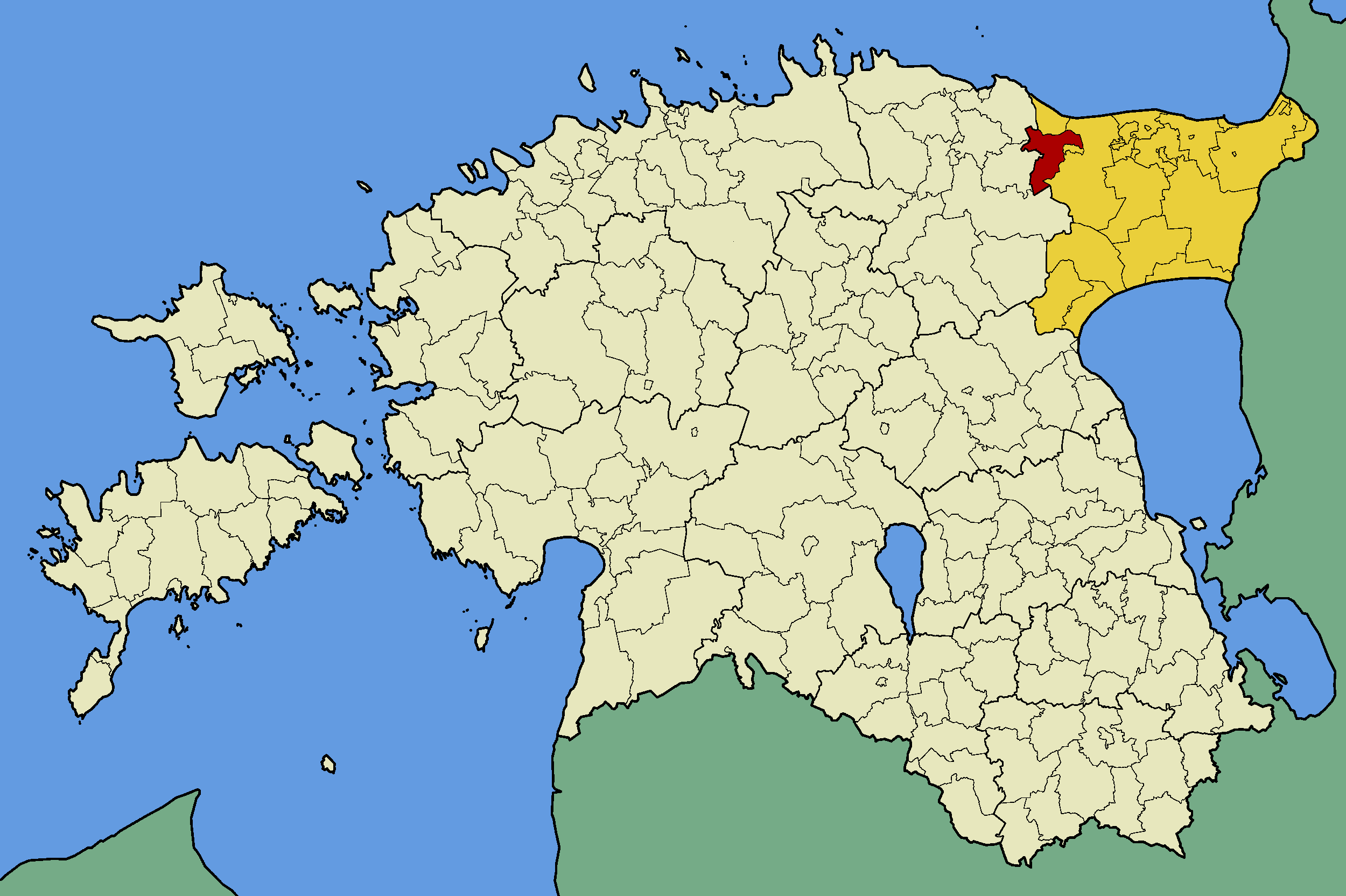
- Sonda Parish within Ida-Viru County.
- Country: Estonia
- County: Ida-Viru County
- Administrative centre: Sonda

Area
  - Total: 161 km^{2} (62 sq mi)

Population (2006)
  - Total: 1,019
  - Density: 6.33/km^{2} (16.4/sq mi)
- Website: www.sonda.ee

Sonda Parish (Estonian: Sonda vald) was an Estonian municipality located in Ida-Viru County. It had a population of 1,019 (2006) and an area of 161 km².

== Settlements ==
Small boroughs

Erra - Sonda

Villages

Erra-Liiva - Ilmaste - Koljala - Nüri - Satsu - Uljaste - Vainu - Vana-Sonda - Varinurme
