= Uljaste =

Uljaste may refer to several places in Estonia:

- Uljaste, Ida-Viru County, village in Lüganuse Parish, Ida-Viru County
  - Lake Uljaste, lake near Sonda
- Uljaste, Lääne-Viru County, village in Vinni Parish, Lääne-Viru County
