= Rebu =

Rebu may refer to:

- Libu or Rebu, Egyptian term for the people of Libya
- Rebu, Estonia, village in Lüganuse Parish, Ida-Viru County, Estonia
- Abba Rebu (reigned 1855–1859), Ethiopian king
- O Rebu, a Brazilian late night telenovela

== See also ==
- Rebus (disambiguation)
