= Aidu =

Aidu may refer to:

- Aidu, Ida-Viru County, village in Maidla Parish, Ida-Viru County, Estonia
- Aidu, Jõgeva County, village in Pajusi Parish, Jõgeva County, Estonia
- Aidu, Viljandi County, village in Paistu Parish, Viljandi County, Estonia

== See also ==
- Aizu, third of Fukushima Prefecture, Japan
