= Voorepera =

Village in Estonia

- Village
- Location within Estonia
- Coordinates: 59°24′N 27°8′E
- Country: Estonia
- County: Ida-Viru County
- Parish: Lüganuse Parish

Population (2000)
  - Total: 56
- Time zone: UTC+2 (EET)
  - Summer (DST): UTC+3 (EEST)

Voorepera is a village in Lüganuse Parish, Ida-Viru County in northeastern Estonia.
