= Varinurme =

Village in Estonia

- Village
- Location in Estonia
- Coordinates: 59°21′11″N 26°53′57″E
- Country: Estonia
- County: Ida-Viru County
- Municipality: Lüganuse Parish

Varinurme is a village in Lüganuse Parish, Ida-Viru County in northeastern Estonia. It is located between Sonda, the centre of the parish, and the town of Kiviõli.

Tallinn–Tapa–Narva goes through the village.

On 29 November 2010 part of the land that belonged to the village on the western side was separated to establish a new official village Vana-Sonda.
