= Lümatu =

Lümatu may refer to several places in Estonia:

- Lümatu, Ida-Viru County, village in Lüganuse Parish, Ida-Viru County
- Lümatu, Võru County, village in Antsla Parish, Võru County
