= Vana-Sonda =

Village in Estonia

- Village
- Location in Estonia
- Coordinates: 59°21′01″N 26°52′10″E
- Country: Estonia
- County: Ida-Viru County
- Municipality: Lüganuse Parish
- Official village: 29 November 2010

Population (01.01.2010)
  - Total: 15

Vana-Sonda is a village in Lüganuse Parish, Ida-Viru County, in northeastern Estonia. It's located about 1.5 km east of Sonda. Vana-Sonda has a population of 15 (as of 1 January 2010)

Tallinn–Tapa–Narva goes through the heart of the village.

Vana-Sonda village was established on 29 November 2010 by separating the land from Varinurme village.
