= Kulja (disambiguation) =

Kulja, Kuldja, Gulja, Ghulja, etc. typically refer to the city of Yining in Xinjiang, China. It was also formerly distinguished as Old Kulja or Tartar Kulja.

They may also refer to:

- Kulja Sultanate or Ili Sultanate, one of the states formed during the 1860s and 1870s Dungan Revolt against the Qing Empire
- Ghulja incident in the Xinjiang city in 1997
- Gulja noir, from the Xinjiang city, another name for the French red wine grape generally known as Mornen noir
- New Kulja or Gulja, also known as Manchu or Chinese Kulja, former names of Huiyuan in Xinjiang, China
- Kulja, Estonia, a village
- Kulja, Western Australia, a town
