= Matka, Estonia =

Village in Estonia

Matka
- Village
- Location within Estonia
- Coordinates: 59°23′38″N 27°0′13″E
- Country: Estonia
- County: Ida-Viru County
- Parish: Lüganuse Parish

Population (2011)
  - Total: 25
- Time zone: UTC+2 (EET)
  - Summer (DST): UTC+3 (EEST)

Matka is a village in Lüganuse Parish, Ida-Viru County, Estonia.
