= Jabara =

Jabara may refer to:

- Jabara (citrus), the plant and fruit of the Japanese citrus family
- Jabara (instrument), a type of cymbal associated with the Korean musical tradition Daechwita
- Jabara, Estonia, a village in Estonia
- Halil-Salim Jabara (1913–1999), Israeli Arab politician
- Hussniya Jabara (born 1958), Israeli politician
- James Jabara (1923–1966), also known as "Jabby" Jabara, American aviator and jet fighter ace
  - Jabara Award, a United States Air Force Academy award for airmanship
  - Colonel James Jabara Airport, an airport at Wichita, Kansas, U.S.
- Paul Jabara (1948–1992), American actor, singer, and songwriter
- Jabara Williams (born 1989), American footballer
- Jubur (Arabic: جبور), sometimes Jabara, the largest Arab tribe in Iraq
