= Uljaste Landscape Conservation Area =

Nature park in Estonia

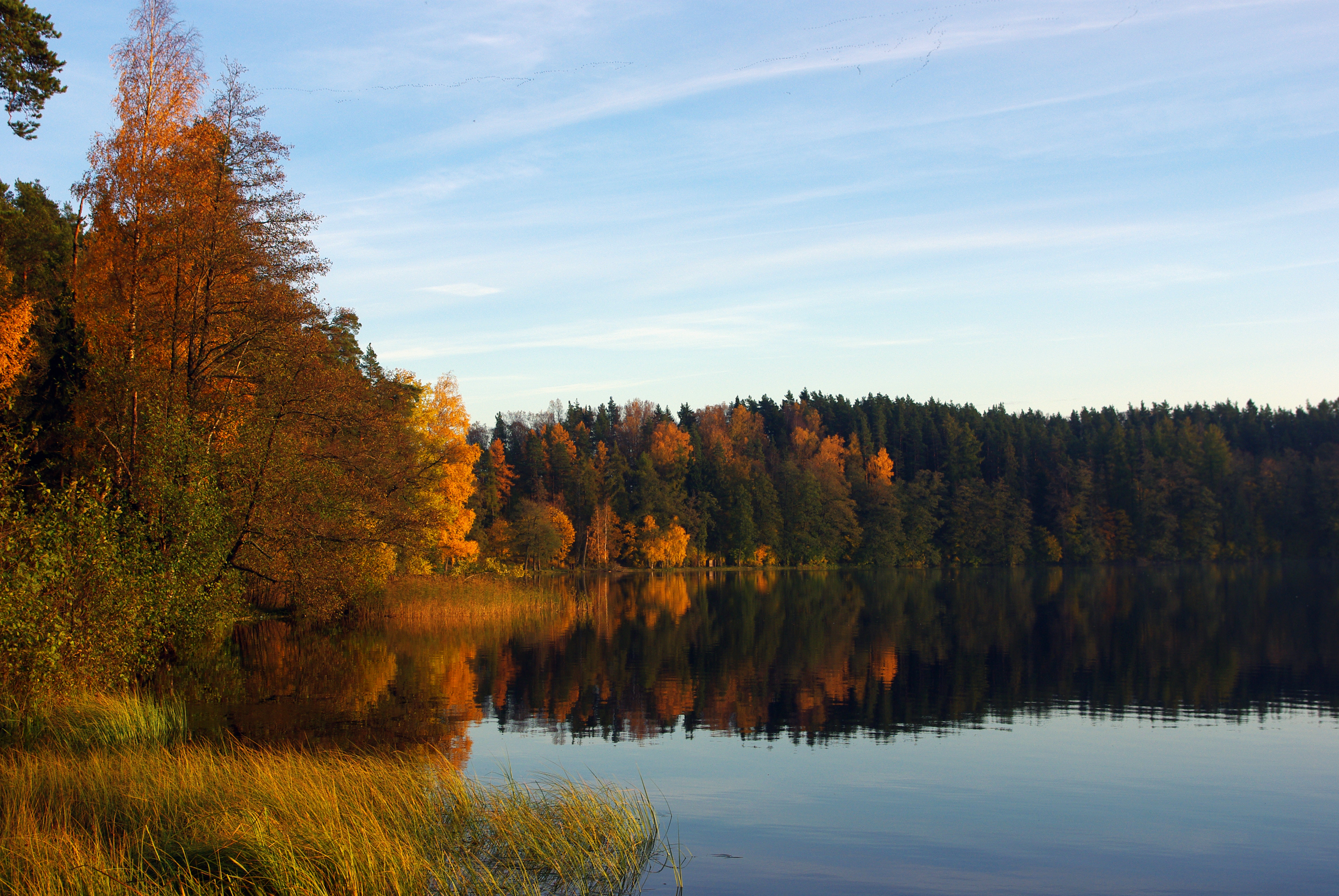

- Location within Estonia
- Location: Estonia
- Coordinates: 59°22′N 26°46′E
- Area: 638 hectares (1,580 acres)
- Established: 1959 (2017)

Uljaste Landscape Conservation Area is a nature park which is located in Lääne-Viru County, Estonia.

The area of the nature park is 638 hectares (1,580 acres).

The protected area was founded in 1959 to protect Uljaste Lake and Uljaste Esker. In 2017, the protected area was designated to the landscape conservation area.
