= Vainu =

Vainu may refer to several places in Estonia:

- Vainu, Ida-Viru County, village in Lüganuse Parish, Ida-Viru County
- Vainu, Pärnu County, village in Tori Parish, Pärnu County
