= Satsu =

Satsu may refer to:

- Megumi Satsu (1948–2010), Japanese-French singer
- Satsu Station, a station in Kami, Mikata District, Hyōgo, Japan
- Satsu, Estonia, village in Lüganuse Parish, Ida-Viru County, Estonia

== In fiction ==
- Satsu (Buffy the Vampire Slayer), a character in Buffy the Vampire Slayer
- Shun Goku Satsu, Akuma's signature technique in the Street Fighter video games
