= Kopli (disambiguation) =

Kopli may refer to several places in Estonia:

- Kopli, subdistrict of Tallinn
- Kopli, Rae Parish, village in Rae Parish, Harju County
- Kopli, Ida-Viru County, village in Lüganuse Parish, Ida-Viru County
- Kopli, Saare County, village in Saaremaa Parish, Saare County
