= Irvala =

Village in Estonia

Coordinates: 59°21′N 27°01′E

- Village
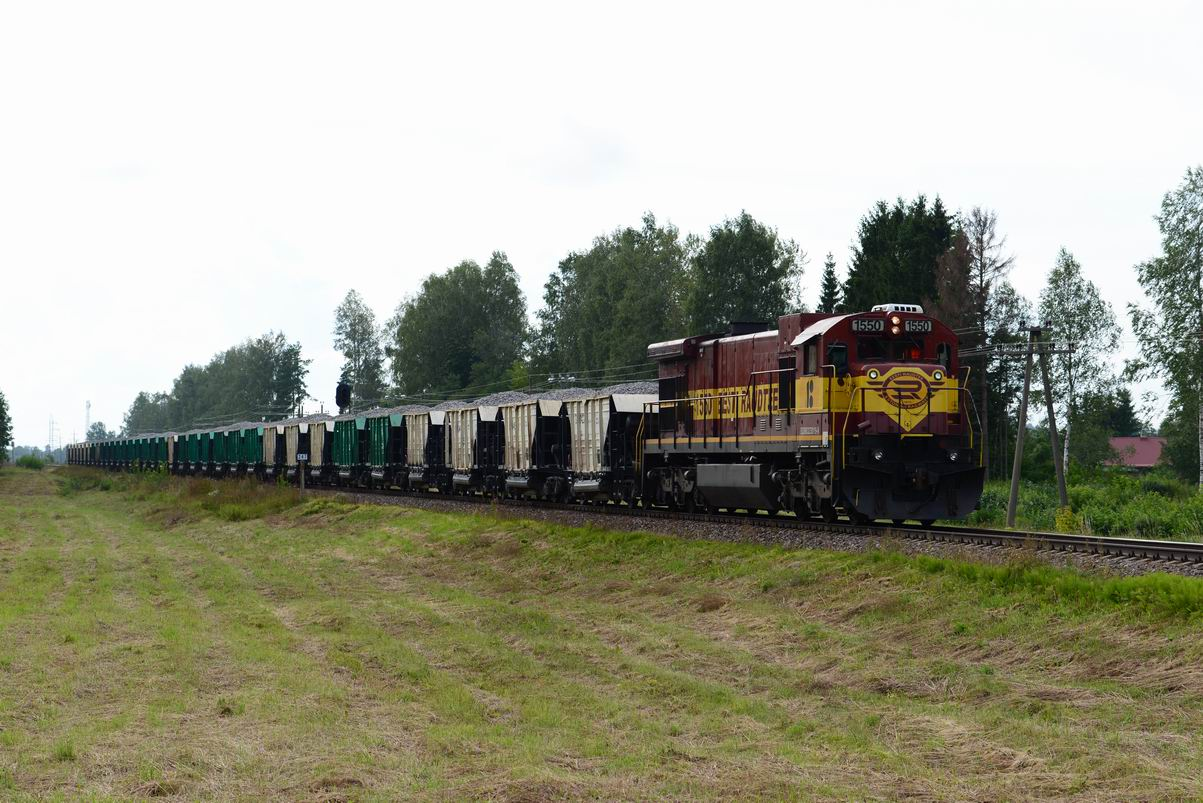
- Freight train on the Tallinn–Narva railway in Irvala
- Interactive map of Irvala
- Country: Estonia
- County: Ida-Viru County
- Parish: Lüganuse Parish
- Time zone: UTC+2 (EET)
  - Summer (DST): UTC+3 (EEST)

Irvala is a village in Lüganuse Parish, Ida-Viru County in northeastern Estonia.
