= Savela =

Savela may refer to:

- Efraim Savela, alternate spelling of Efraim Sevela, a Soviet-Russian-Israeli screenwriter, director, producer, and writer.
- Mika Savela, Finnish trance musician
- Savela, Helsinki, district of Helsinki
- Savela, Jyväskylä, district of Jyväskylä

== See also ==
- Savala, village in Maidla Parish, Ida-Viru County, Estonia
