= Koolma =

Koolma may refer to several places in Estonia:

- Koolma, Ida-Viru County, village in Maidla Parish, Ida-Viru County
- Koolma, Põlva County, village in Veriora Parish, Põlva County
