= Moldova, Estonia =

Village in northeastern Estonia

Moldova
- Village
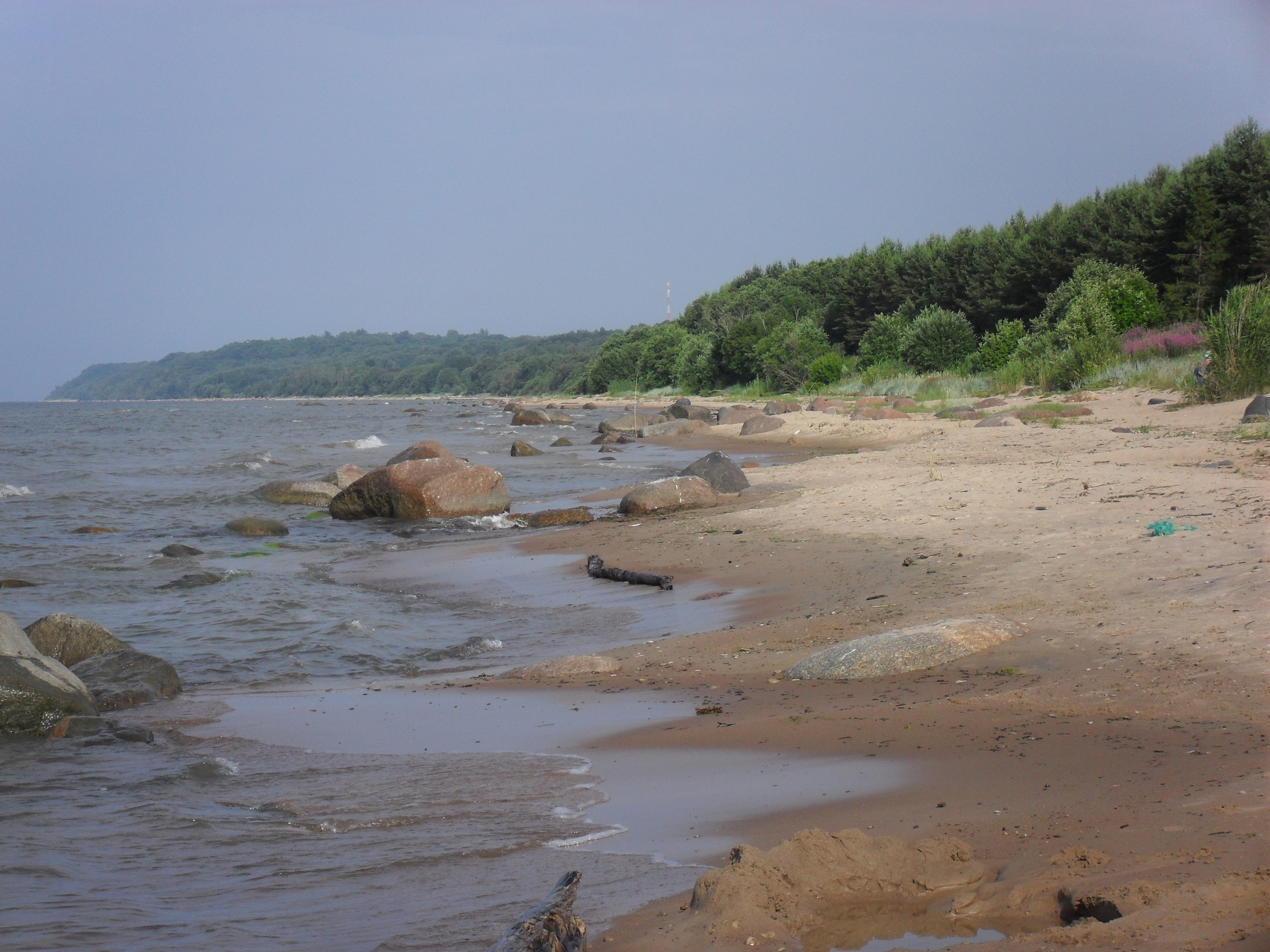
- Beach in Moldova, Estonia

- Location within Estonia
- Coordinates: 59°25′29″N 27°06′32″E
- Country: Estonia
- County: Ida-Viru County
- Parish: Lüganuse Parish
- Time zone: UTC+2 (EET)
  - Summer (DST): UTC+3 (EEST)

Moldova (Estonian: [ˈmoltovɑ]) is a village in Lüganuse Parish, Ida-Viru County, in northeastern Estonia.
