= Aruvälja, Ida-Viru County =

Village in Estonia

Coordinates: 59°18′09″N 26°59′35″E

Aruvälja
- Village
- Interactive map of Aruvälja
- Country: Estonia
- County: Ida-Viru County
- Municipality: Lüganuse Parish
- Time zone: UTC+2 (EET)
  - Summer (DST): UTC+3 (EEST)

Aruvälja is a village in Lüganuse Parish, Ida-Viru County in northeastern Estonia.
