= Veneoja =

Village in Estonia

Coordinates: 59°15′14″N 26°59′47″E

- Village
- Interactive map of Veneoja
- Country: Estonia
- County: Ida-Viru County
- Municipality: Lüganuse Parish
- Time zone: UTC+2 (EET)
  - Summer (DST): UTC+3 (EEST)

Veneoja is a village in Lüganuse Parish, Ida-Viru County in northeastern Estonia.
