= Erra-Liiva =

Village in Estonia

Coordinates: 59°21′39″N 27°00′28″E

- Village
- Interactive map of Erra-Liiva
- Country: Estonia
- County: Ida-Viru County
- Parish: Lüganuse Parish
- Time zone: UTC+2 (EET)
  - Summer (DST): UTC+3 (EEST)

Erra-Liiva is a village in Lüganuse Parish, Ida-Viru County in northeastern Estonia.
