= Salaküla =

Village in Estonia

Coordinates: 59°21′N 26°55′E

- Village
- Interactive map of Salaküla
- Country: Estonia
- County: Ida-Viru County
- Municipality: Lüganuse Parish
- Time zone: UTC+2 (EET)
  - Summer (DST): UTC+3 (EEST)

Salaküla is a village in Lüganuse Parish, Ida-Viru County in northeastern Estonia.
