= Kopli, Ida-Viru County =

Village in Estonia

Coordinates: 59°22′58″N 27°02′40″E

Kopli
- Village
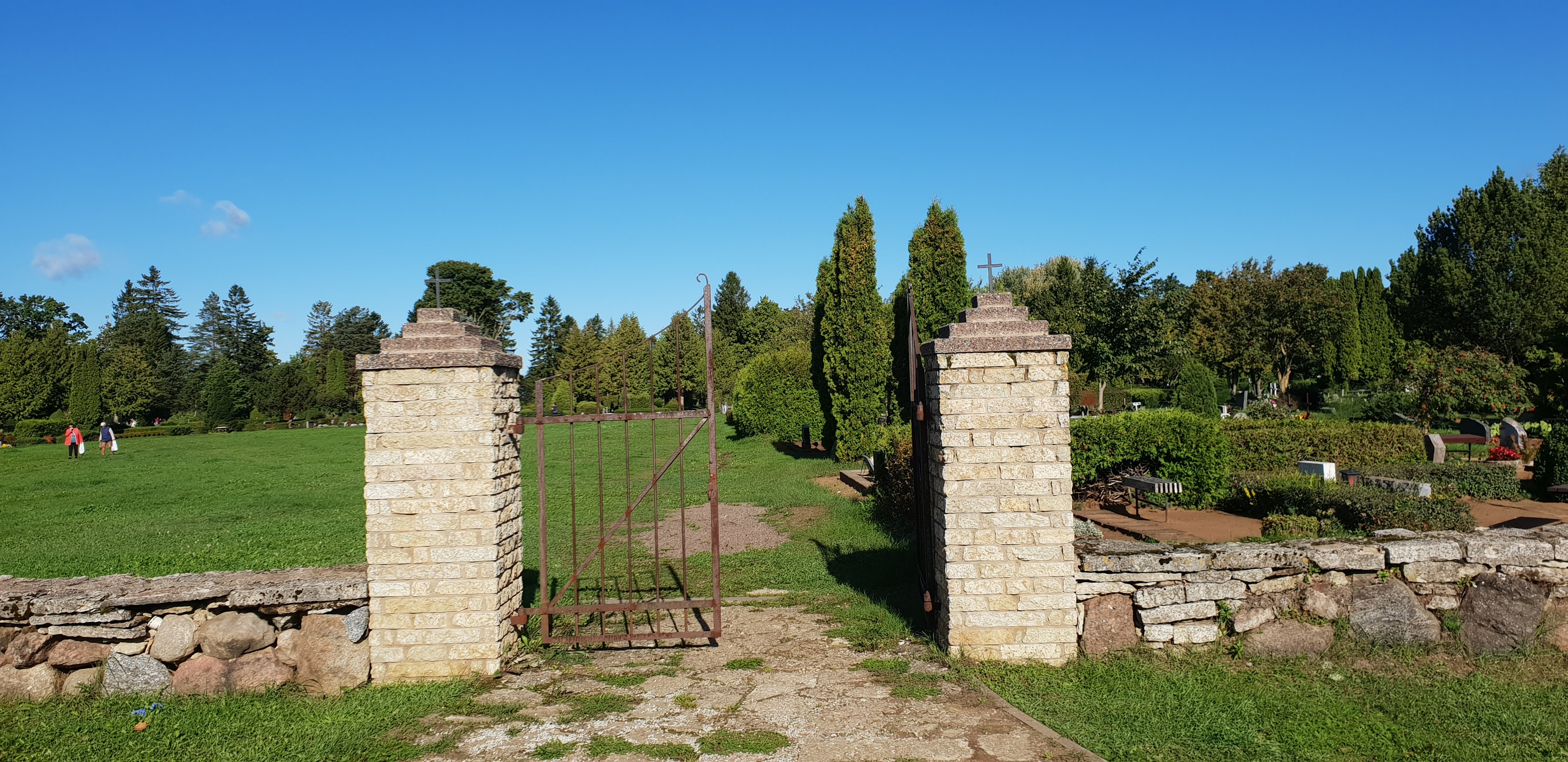
- Lüganuse cemetery in Kopli
- Interactive map of Kopli
- Country: Estonia
- County: Ida-Viru County
- Parish: Lüganuse Parish
- Time zone: UTC+2 (EET)
  - Summer (DST): UTC+3 (EEST)

Kopli is a village in Lüganuse Parish, Ida-Viru County in northeastern Estonia.
