= Maidla, Ida-Viru County =

Village in Estonia

Maidla
- Village
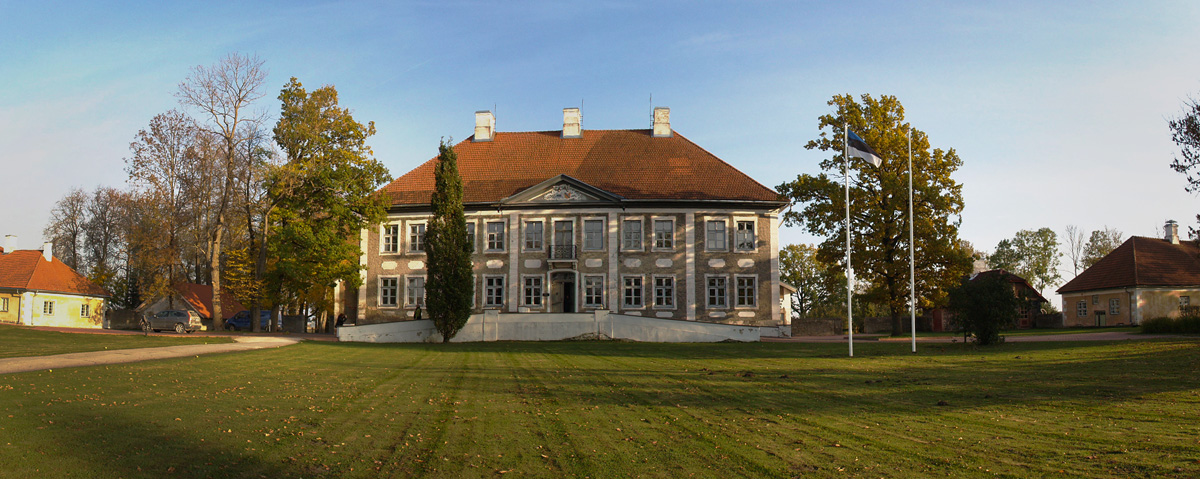
- Maidla Manor

- Location in Estonia
- Coordinates: 59°20′N 27°00′E
- Country: Estonia
- County: Ida-Viru County
- Municipality: Lüganuse Parish
- Time zone: UTC+2 (EET)
  - Summer (DST): UTC+3 (EEST)

Maidla is a village in Lüganuse Parish, Ida-Viru County in northeastern Estonia.

== Maidla Manor ==
Maidla manor (German: Herrenhaus Wrangelstein) traces its history back to at least 1465, although the village was mentioned for the first time as early as the 13th century, in the Danish Census Book. Over the centuries, the manor estate belonged to several different aristocratic families. The present baroque manor house was built in 1764–1767 based on plans by the architect Johann Paul Dürschmidt during the ownership of the Wrangel family. After the Estonian land reform that followed the declaration of independence of Estonia in 1919, the manor was converted into a school. The manor is a fine example of baroque manor house architecture in Estonia. Details such as the finely carved door, interior stucco decoration, and the pediment decorated with coats-of-arms, survive.

== See also ==
- List of palaces and manor houses in Estonia
