= Aidu-Nõmme =

Village in Estonia

Coordinates: 59°20′N 27°06′E

- Village
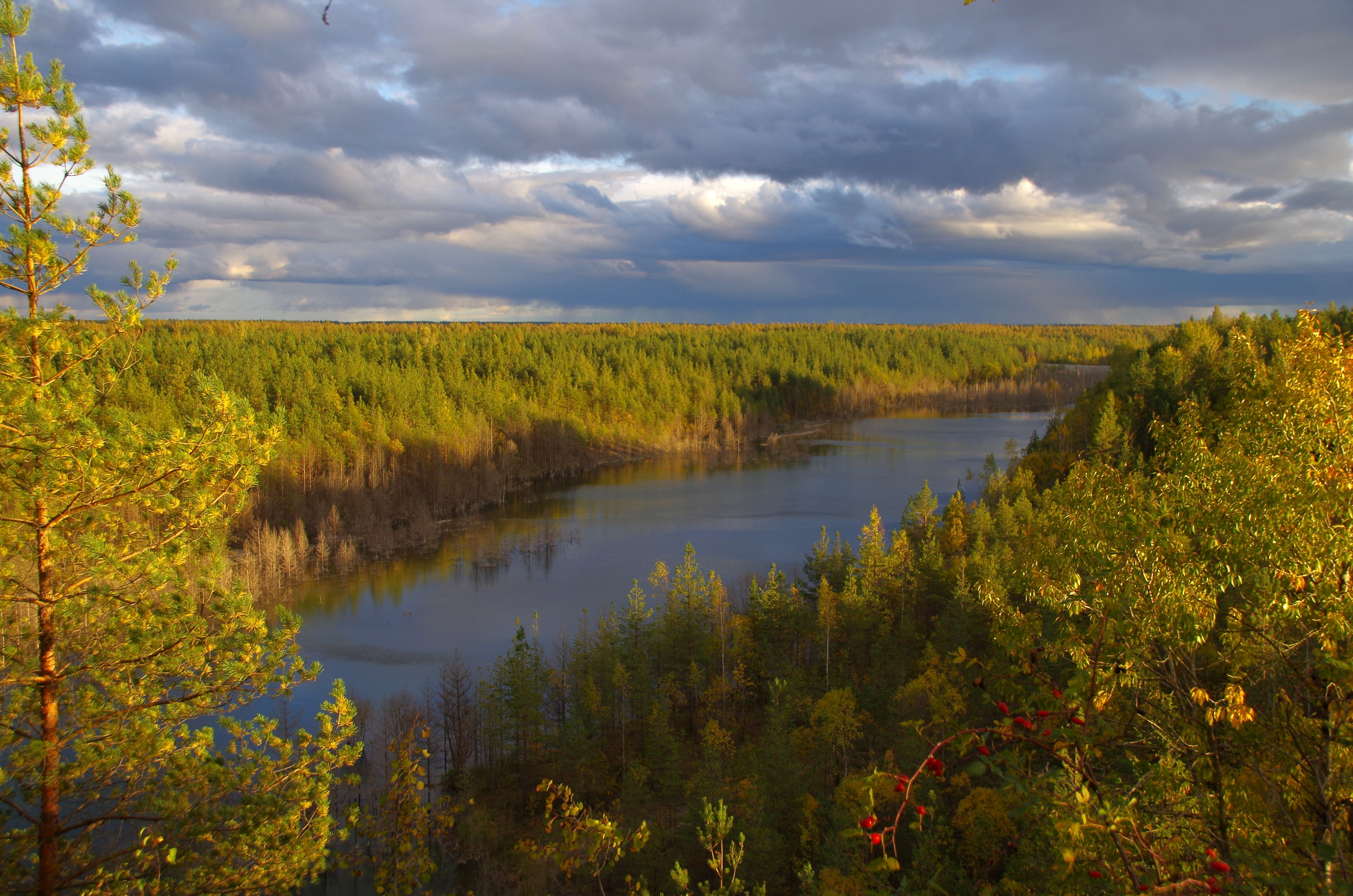
- Rehabilitated Aidu quarry
- Interactive map of Aidu-Nõmme
- Country: Estonia
- County: Ida-Viru County
- Municipality: Lüganuse Parish
- Time zone: UTC+2 (EET)
  - Summer (DST): UTC+3 (EEST)

Aidu-Nõmme is a village in Lüganuse Parish, Ida-Viru County in northeastern Estonia.
