= Aruküla, Lüganuse Parish =

Village in Estonia

Coordinates: 59°17′42″N 27°01′44″E

Aruküla
- Village
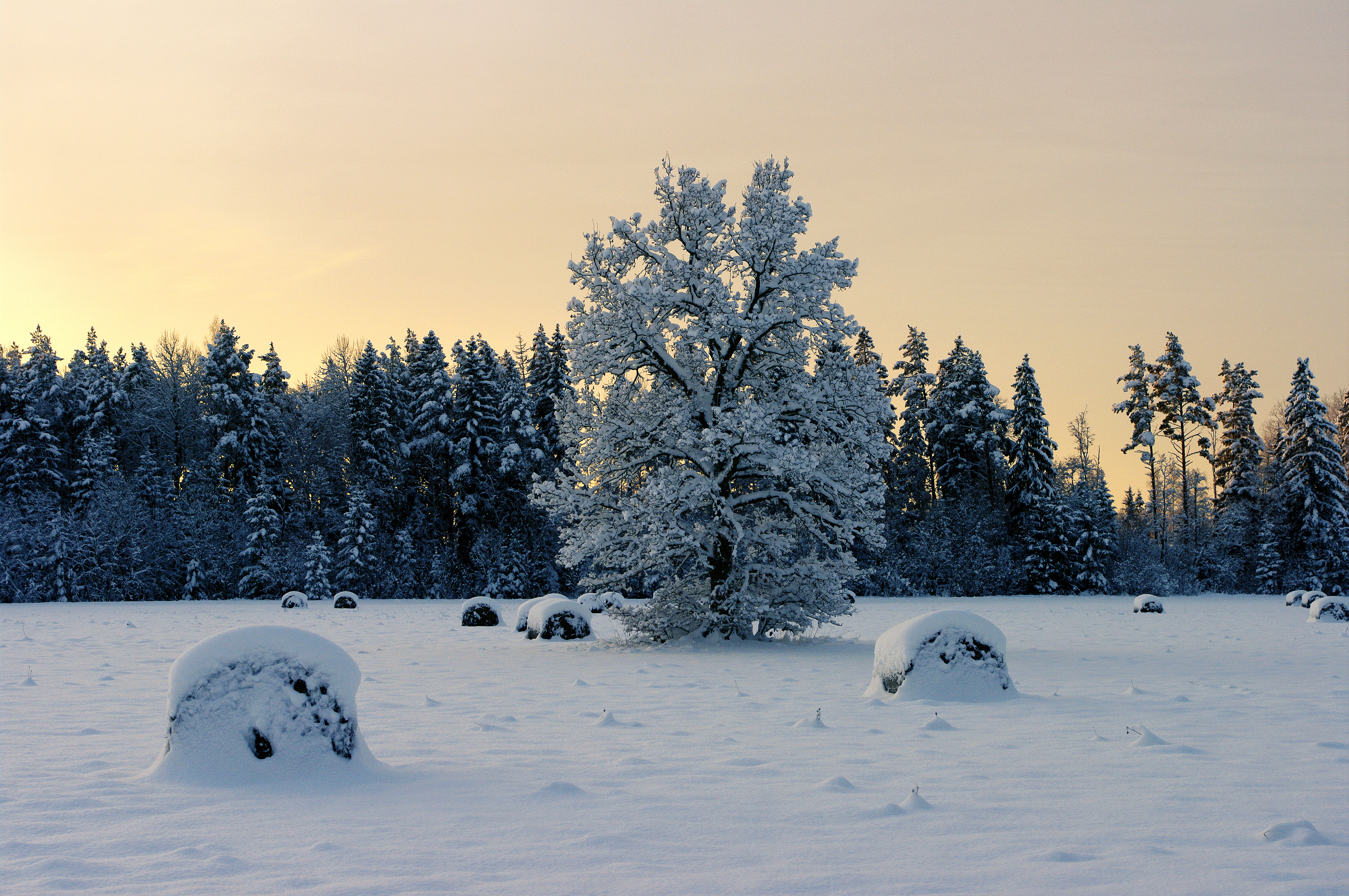
- Snowy Aruküla scenery
- Interactive map of Aruküla
- Country: Estonia
- County: Ida-Viru County
- Municipality: Lüganuse Parish
- Time zone: UTC+2 (EET)
  - Summer (DST): UTC+3 (EEST)

Aruküla is a village in Lüganuse Parish, Ida-Viru County in northeastern Estonia.
