= Ojamaa =

Village in Estonia

Coordinates: 59°17′13″N 27°06′50″E

- Village
- Interactive map of Ojamaa
- Country: Estonia
- County: Ida-Viru County
- Municipality: Lüganuse Parish
- Time zone: UTC+2 (EET)
  - Summer (DST): UTC+3 (EEST)

Ojamaa is a village in Lüganuse Parish, Ida-Viru County in northeastern Estonia.
