= Lake Uljaste =

Lake in Estonia

- Uljaste järv (Estonian)
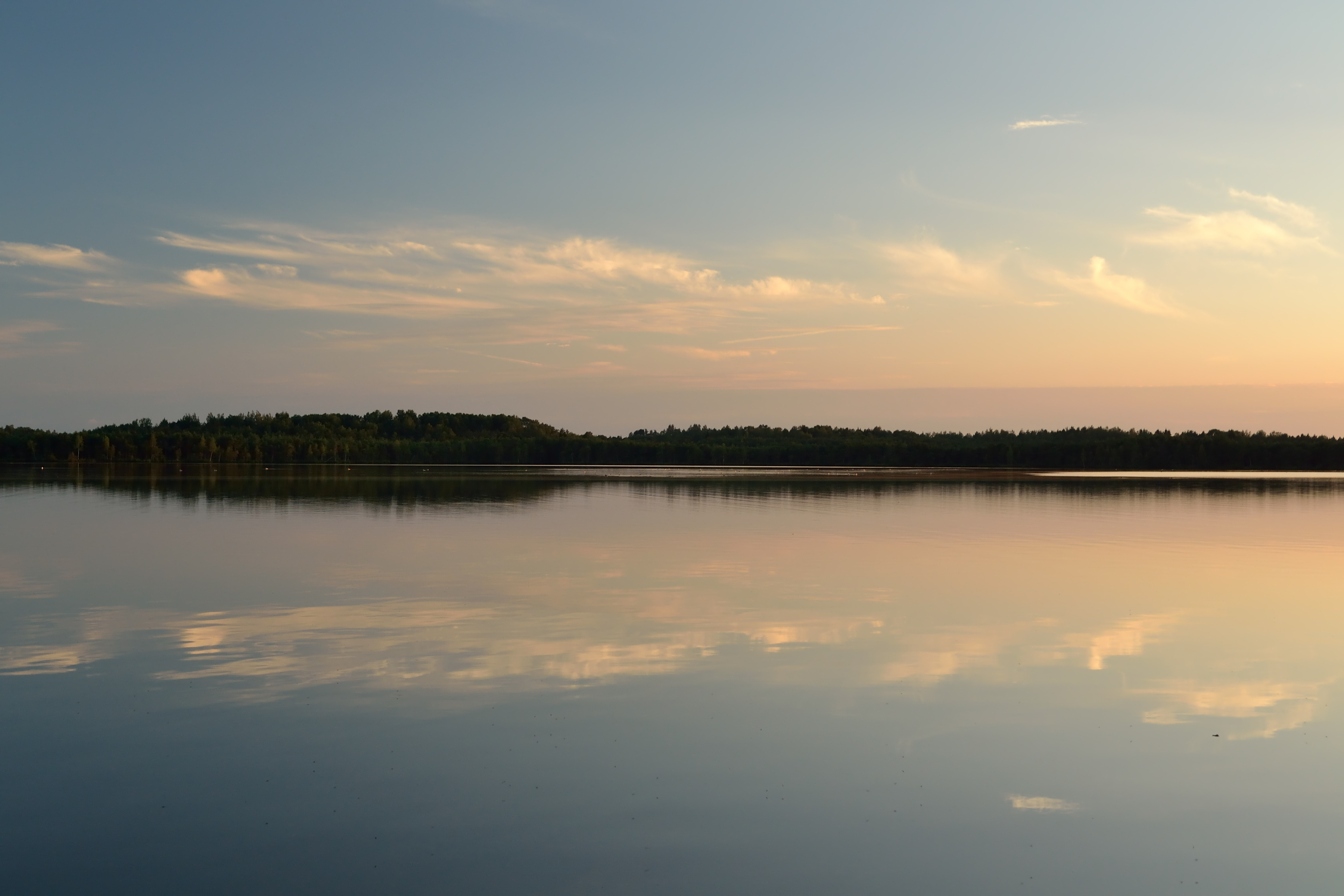

- Location within Estonia
- Location: Ida-Viru County, Estonia
- Coordinates: 59°21.5′N 26°46.5′E
- Basin countries: Estonia
- Max. length: 1,280 meters (4,200 ft)
- Surface area: 63.3 hectares (156 acres)
- Average depth: 3.4 meters (11 ft)
- Max. depth: 5.1 meters (17 ft)
- Shore length^{1}: 3,690 meters (12,110 ft)
- Surface elevation: 67.1 meters (220 ft)
- ^{1} Shore length is not a well-defined measure.

Lake Uljaste (Estonian: Uljaste järv, also Uljastjärv or Suur Uljaste järv, Russian: Ульясте) is a lake in Estonia. It is located in the village of Uljaste in Lüganuse Parish, Ida-Viru County.

== Physical description ==
The lake has an area of 63.3 hectares (156 acres). The lake has an average depth of 3.4 meters (11 ft) and a maximum depth of 5.1 meters (17 ft). It is 1,280 meters (4,200 ft) long, and its shoreline measures 3,690 meters (12,110 ft). It has a volume of 2,162,000 cubic meters (76,400,000 cu ft).

== Gallery ==
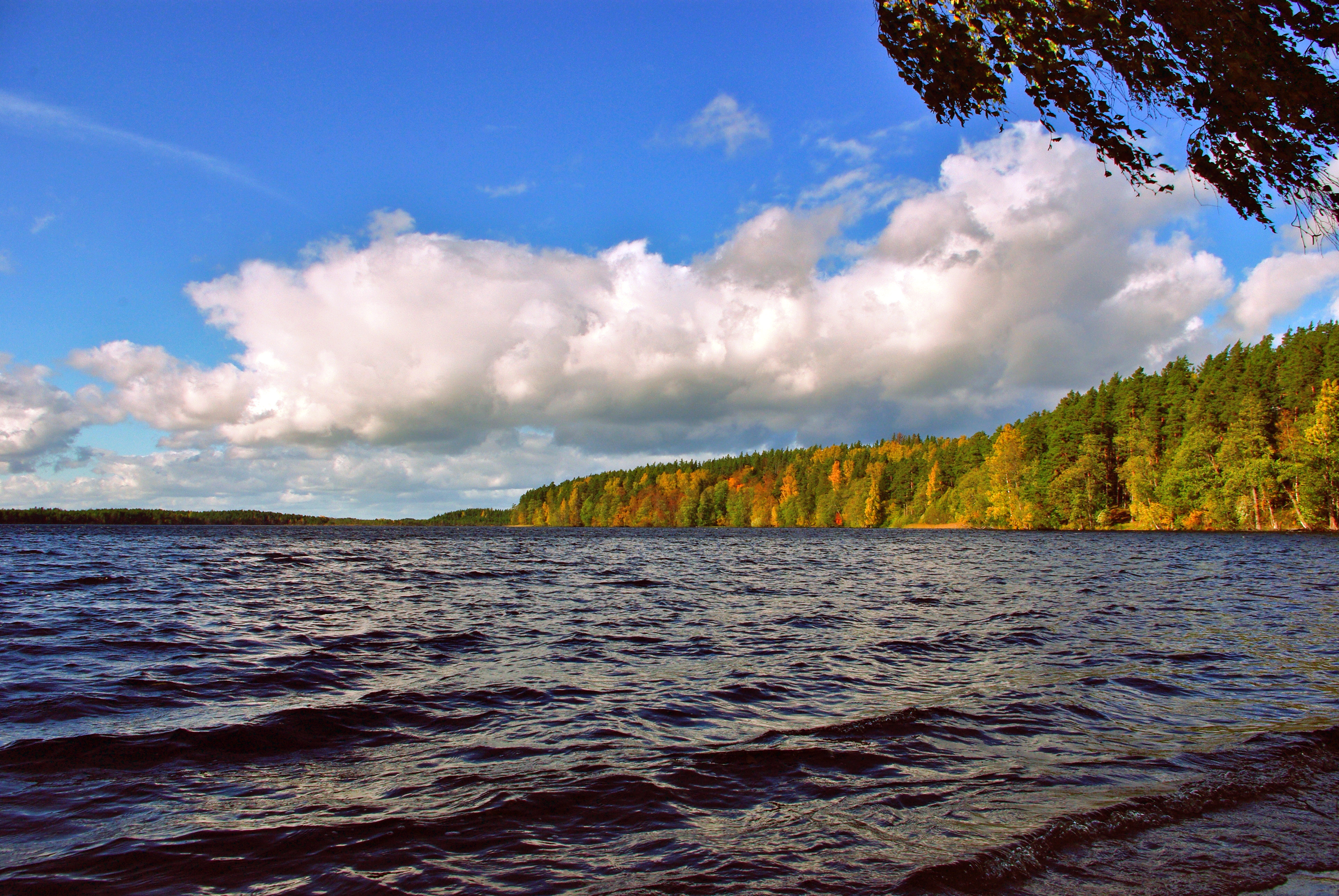

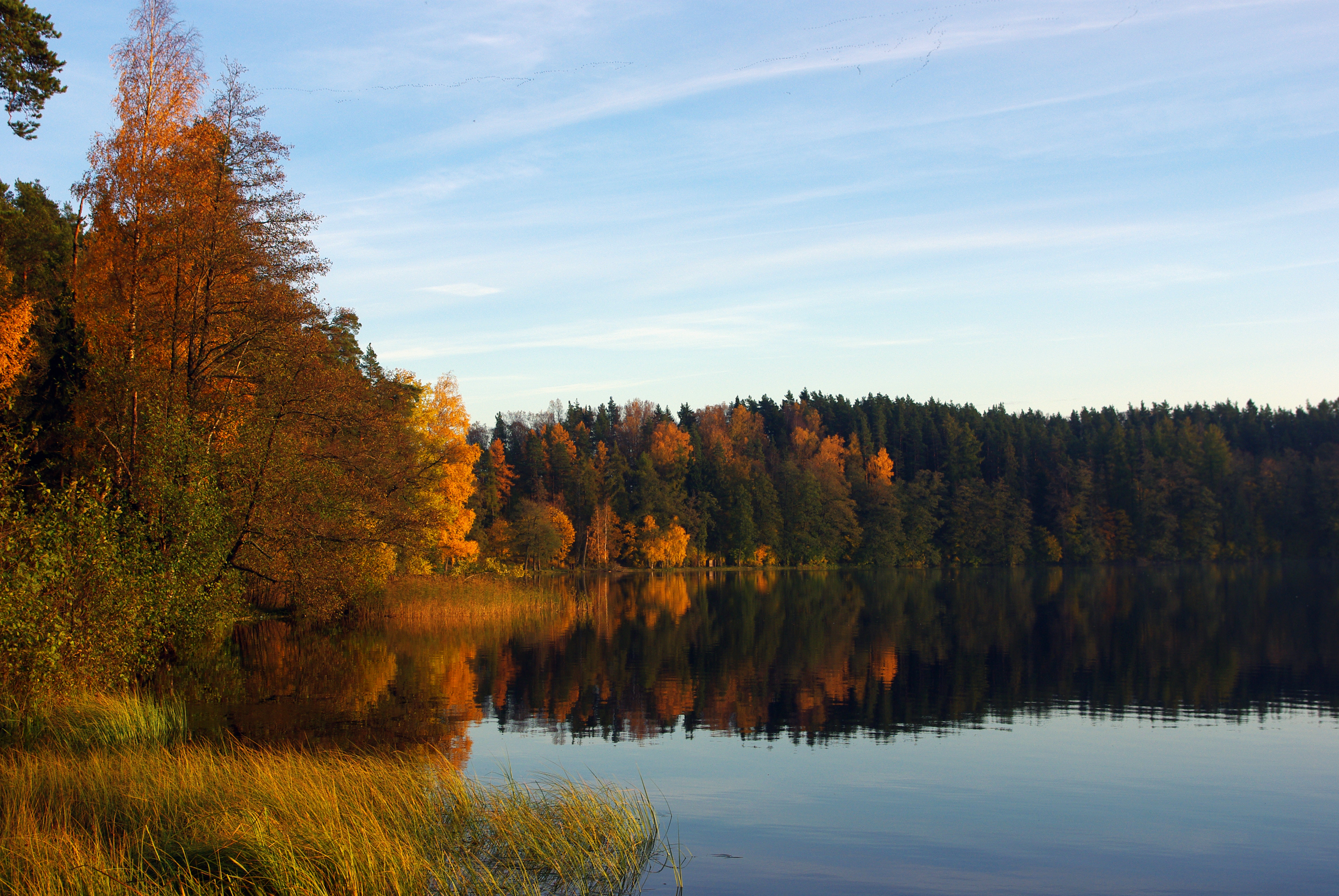

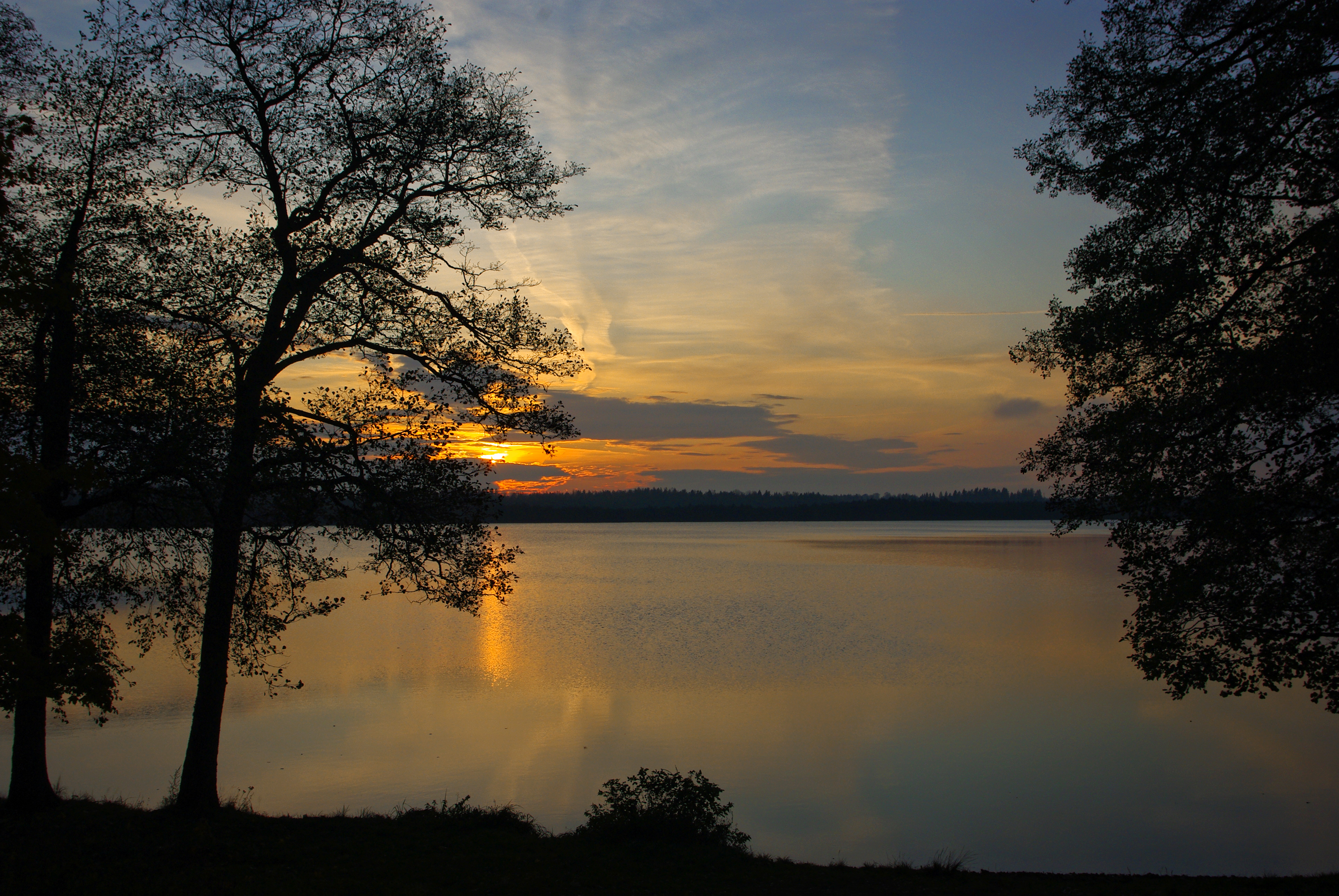

== See also ==
- List of lakes of Estonia
