= Uniküla, Ida-Viru County =

Village in Estonia

Coordinates: 59°18′48″N 27°01′11″E

Uniküla
- Village
- Interactive map of Uniküla
- Country: Estonia
- County: Ida-Viru County
- Municipality: Lüganuse Parish
- Time zone: UTC+2 (EET)
  - Summer (DST): UTC+3 (EEST)

Uniküla is a village in Lüganuse Parish, Ida-Viru County in northeastern Estonia.
