= Erra, Estonia =

Borough in Estonia

Erra
- Small borough
- Location in Estonia
- Coordinates: 59°22′20″N 26°59′16″E
- Country: Estonia
- County: Ida-Viru County
- Municipality: Lüganuse Parish

Population (2011 Census)
  - Total: 130

Erra (German: Erras) is a small borough (Estonian: alevik) in Lüganuse Parish, Ida-Viru County, in northeastern Estonia. As of the 2011 census, the settlement's population was 130.
