= Aidu, Ida-Viru County =

Village in Estonia

Coordinates: 59°19′40″N 27°04′43″E

Aidu
- Village
- Interactive map of Aidu
- Country: Estonia
- County: Ida-Viru County
- Municipality: Lüganuse Parish

Population (2011)
  - Total: 0
  - Density: 0/km^{2} (0/sq mi)
- Time zone: UTC+2 (EET)
  - Summer (DST): UTC+3 (EEST)

Aidu is a village in Lüganuse Parish, Ida-Viru County in north-eastern Estonia. According to the 2011 census, there were no permanent residents living in the village.
