= Rebus (disambiguation) =

A rebus is a kind of word puzzle that uses pictures to represent words or parts of words.

Rebus may also refer to:

- Inspector Rebus, a series of detective novels by Ian Rankin
  - Detective Inspector John Rebus, the protagonist in the Inspector Rebus novels
  - Rebus (2000 TV series), a television series based on the Inspector Rebus novels, airing between 2000 and 2007
  - Rebus (2024 TV series), a 2024 television series based on the Inspector Rebus novels
- Rebus (film), a 1969 crime film
- Rebus (album), a 2007 album by Joe Morris
- Kartia: The Word of Fate, known in Japan as Rebus, a 1998 video game by Atlus
- "Rebus", a song by Squarepusher from the 1997 album Hard Normal Daddy

== See also ==
- Rebus coat-of-arms, a coat of arms where the individual or community represented is translated into a rebus
