= Savala =

Village in Estonia

Coordinates: 59°19′N 27°01′E

- Village
- Interactive map of Savala
- Country: Estonia
- County: Ida-Viru County
- Municipality: Lüganuse Parish
- Time zone: UTC+2 (EET)
  - Summer (DST): UTC+3 (EEST)

Savala is a village and seat of Lüganuse Parish, Ida-Viru County in northeastern Estonia.

The village has been part of Lüganuse parish. Before Maidla municipality merged with Lüganuse municipality in 2013, Savala was the administrative center of Maidla municipality.
