= Satsu, Estonia =

Village in Estonia

Satsu
- Village
- Location within Estonia
- Coordinates: 59°22′45″N 26°50′28″E
- Country: Estonia
- County: Ida-Viru County
- Parish: Lüganuse Parish

Population (2011)
  - Total: 12
- Time zone: UTC+2 (EET)
  - Summer (DST): UTC+3 (EEST)

Satsu is a village in Lüganuse Parish, Ida-Viru County, Estonia.
