= Lüganuse Parish =

Municipality of Estonia (2017)

Coordinates: 59°22′N 27°3′E

Lüganuse Parish Lüganuse vald
- Municipality of Estonia
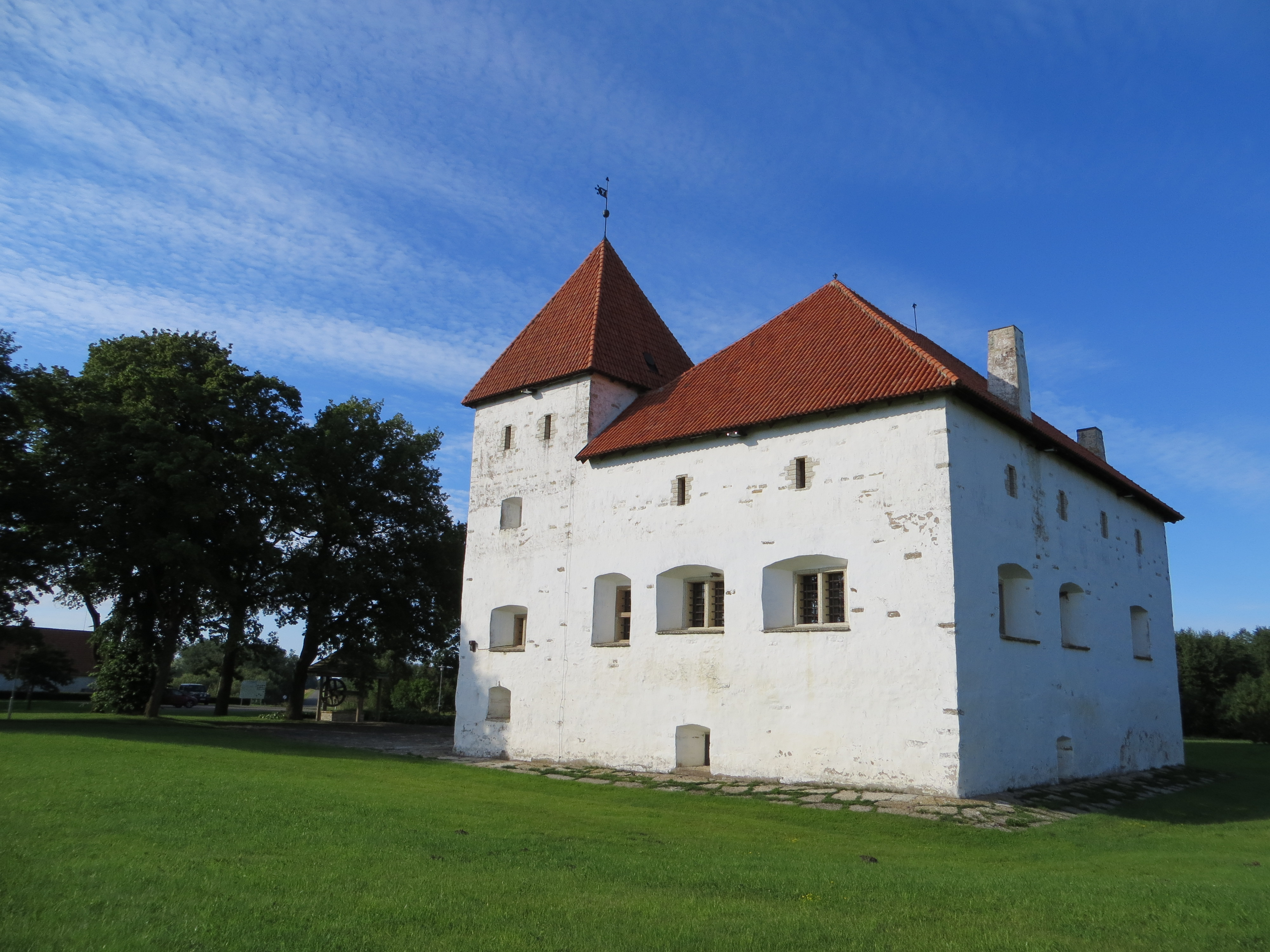
- Purtse Castle

- Flag Coat of arms

- Lüganuse Parish within Ida-Viru County
- Country: Estonia
- County: Ida-Viru County
- Administrative centre: Lüganuse

Government
  - Mayor: Viktor Rauam

Area
  - Total: 599 km^{2} (231 sq mi)

Population (01.01.2019)
  - Total: 8,552
  - Density: 6.7/km^{2} (17/sq mi)
- ISO 3166 code: EE-442
- Website: www.lyganuse.ee

Lüganuse Parish (Estonian: Lüganuse vald) is a municipality of Ida-Viru County in northern Estonia. As of 1 January 2015, it had a population of 2,941.

In October 2013, the neighbouring Maidla Parish and the town of Püssi were merged into Lüganuse Parish.

== Geography ==
The territory of the municipality is located on the Viru Plateau, the part directly bordering the sea is located on the coastal lowland. The Purtse river flowing through its territory. The Environmental Agency has compiled the climate data for the municipality based on estimates as there is no weather station with long-term observation data in the municipality. There is hydrometric station of the Environmental Agency in Lüganuse small borough.

Climate data for Lüganuse parish 1991–2020
Month	Jan	Feb	Mar	Apr	May	Jun	Jul	Aug	Sep	Oct	Nov	Dec	Year
Mean maximum °C (°F)	4.4 (39.9)	4.4 (39.9)	9.8 (49.6)	20.2 (68.4)	25.2 (77.4)	26.9 (80.4)	28.6 (83.5)	27.7 (81.9)	22.6 (72.7)	15.5 (59.9)	9.3 (48.7)	5.7 (42.3)	16.7 (62.1)
Daily mean °C (°F)	−4.3 (24.3)	−4.7 (23.5)	−1.3 (29.7)	4.6 (40.3)	10.4 (50.7)	14.8 (58.6)	17.4 (63.3)	16.1 (61.0)	11.5 (52.7)	5.8 (42.4)	1.1 (34.0)	−2.1 (28.2)	5.8 (42.4)
Mean minimum °C (°F)	−20.4 (−4.7)	−20.2 (−4.4)	−15.6 (3.9)	−6.4 (20.5)	−2.6 (27.3)	2.3 (36.1)	6.3 (43.3)	4.6 (40.3)	0.1 (32.2)	−5.2 (22.6)	−10.3 (13.5)	−15.2 (4.6)	−6.9 (19.6)
Average precipitation mm (inches)	44.2 (1.74)	34.6 (1.36)	33.5 (1.32)	33.3 (1.31)	45.4 (1.79)	77.0 (3.03)	70.6 (2.78)	84.5 (3.33)	58.5 (2.30)	71.4 (2.81)	56.1 (2.21)	47.5 (1.87)	656.6 (25.85)
Source: Keskkonnaagentuur.ee

== Settlements ==
Towns: Kiviõli, Püssi

Small boroughs: Erra, Lüganuse, Sonda

Villages: Aa, Aidu, Aidu-Liiva, Aidu-Nõmme, Aidu-Sooküla, Aruküla, Arupäälse, Aruvälja, Erra-Liiva, Hirmuse, Ilmaste, Irvala, Jabara, Koljala, Koolma, Kopli, Kulja, Liimala, Lipu, Lohkuse, Lümatu, Maidla, Matka, Mehide, Moldova, Mustmätta, Nüri, Oandu, Ojamaa, Piilse, Purtse, Rebu, Rääsa, Salaküla, Satsu, Savala, Sirtsi, Soonurme, Tarumaa, Uljaste, Uniküla, Vainu, Vana-Sonda, Varinurme, Varja, Veneoja, Virunurme and Voorepera

== Religion ==
Religion in Lüganuse Parish (2021)
1. Unaffiliated (65.3%)
2. Orthodox (27.0%)
3. Lutheran (5.10%)
4. Other Christians (0.20%)
5. Unknown (2.40%)

== Notable people ==
- Voldemar Mellik (1887 in Purtse – Tallinn), sculptor, he taught at Pallas Art School, 1920 until 1935
- Heino Lipp (1922 in Erra-Liiva – 2006), athlete, excellent decathlete of the 1940s
- Andi Meister (1938 – 2025), a road engineer and politician, Minister of Roads and Communications, 1992–1995
- Urmas Espenberg (born in Aa 1961), author, politician and publicist
