= Vainu, Ida-Viru County =

Village in Estonia

Coordinates: 59°22′50″N 26°58′19″E

Vainu
- Village
- Location within Estonia
- Country: Estonia
- County: Ida-Viru County
- Parish: Lüganuse Parish
- Time zone: UTC+2 (EET)
  - Summer (DST): UTC+3 (EEST)

Vainu is a village in Lüganuse Parish, Ida-Viru County in northeastern Estonia.
