= Kulja, Estonia =

Village in Estonia

Coordinates: 59°18′31″N 26°58′42″E

Kulja
- Village
- Interactive map of Kulja
- Country: Estonia
- County: Ida-Viru County
- Municipality: Lüganuse Parish
- Time zone: UTC+2 (EET)
  - Summer (DST): UTC+3 (EEST)

Kulja is a village in Lüganuse Parish, Ida-Viru County in northeastern Estonia.
