= Sonda, Estonia =

Borough in Estonia

Sonda
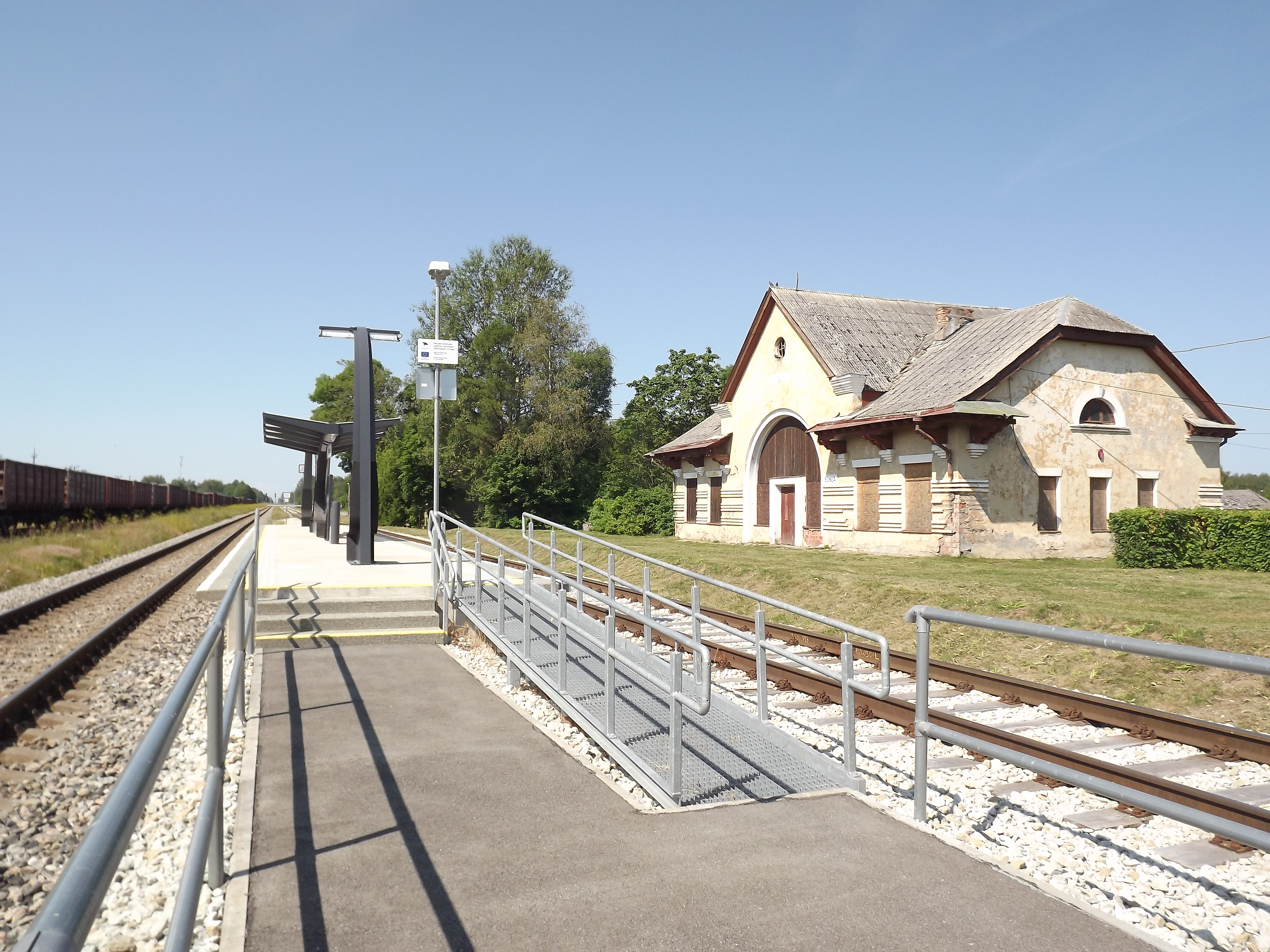
- The old Sonda railway station

- Location within Estonia
- Coordinates: 59°20′37″N 26°50′11″E
- Country: Estonia
- County: Ida-Viru County
- Parish: Lüganuse Parish
- Time zone: UTC+2 (EET)

Sonda is a small borough (alevik) in Lüganuse Parish Ida-Viru County, in northeastern Estonia. Prior to 2017, it was the administrative centre of the former Sonda Parish.

| Preceding station | Elron | Following station |
|---|---|---|
| Kabala towards Tallinn | Tallinn–Narva | Kiviõli towards Narva |
