= Uljaste, Ida-Viru County =

Village in Estonia

Coordinates: 59°21′42″N 26°47′13″E

Uljaste
- Village
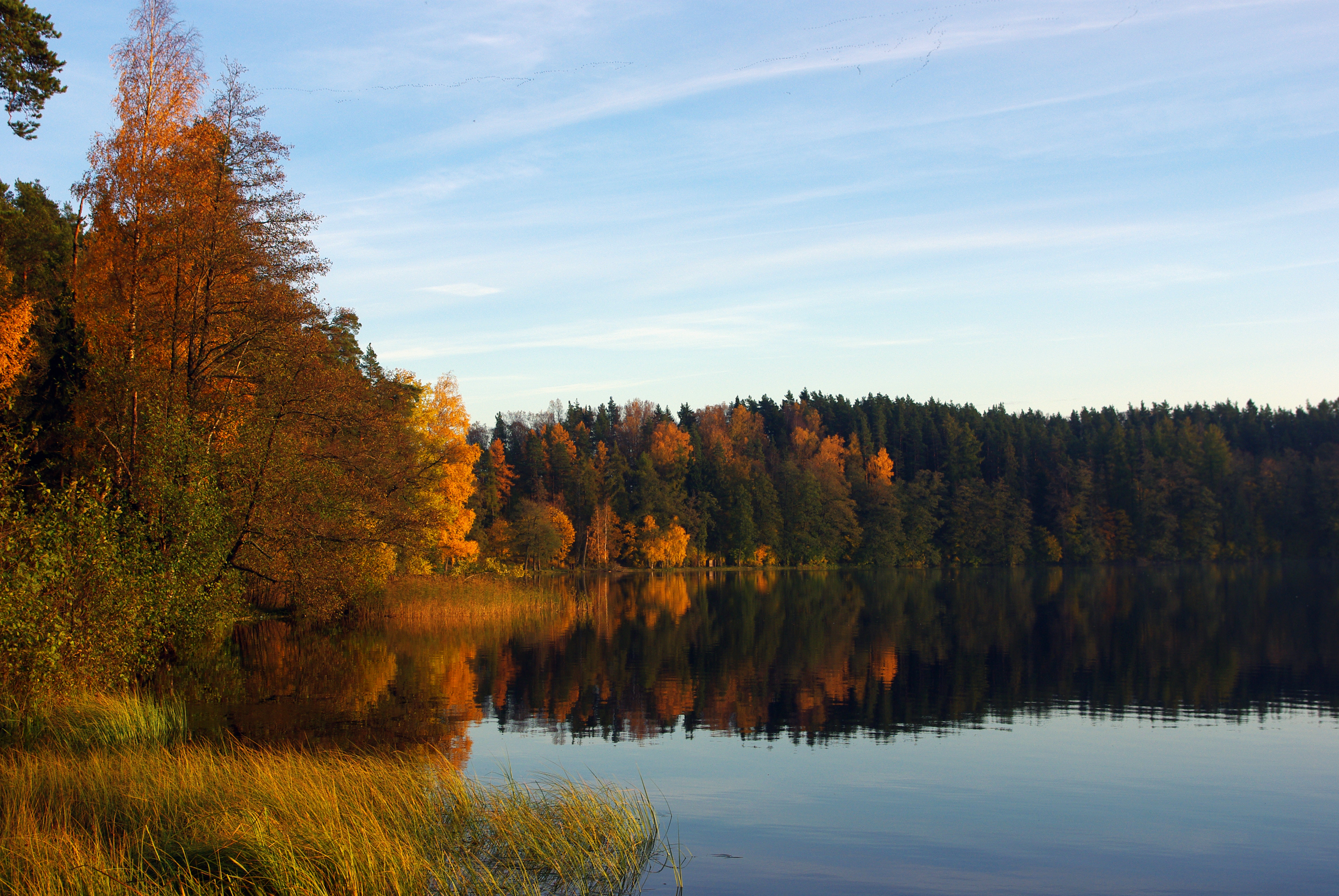
- Lake Uljaste
- Interactive map of Uljaste
- Country: Estonia
- County: Ida-Viru County
- Parish: Lüganuse Parish
- Time zone: UTC+2 (EET)
  - Summer (DST): UTC+3 (EEST)

Uljaste is a village in Lüganuse Parish, Ida-Viru County in northeastern Estonia.
