= Ida-Viru County =

County in northeastern Estonia

Coordinates: 59°13′N 27°18′E

Ida-Viru County Ida-Virumaa
- County
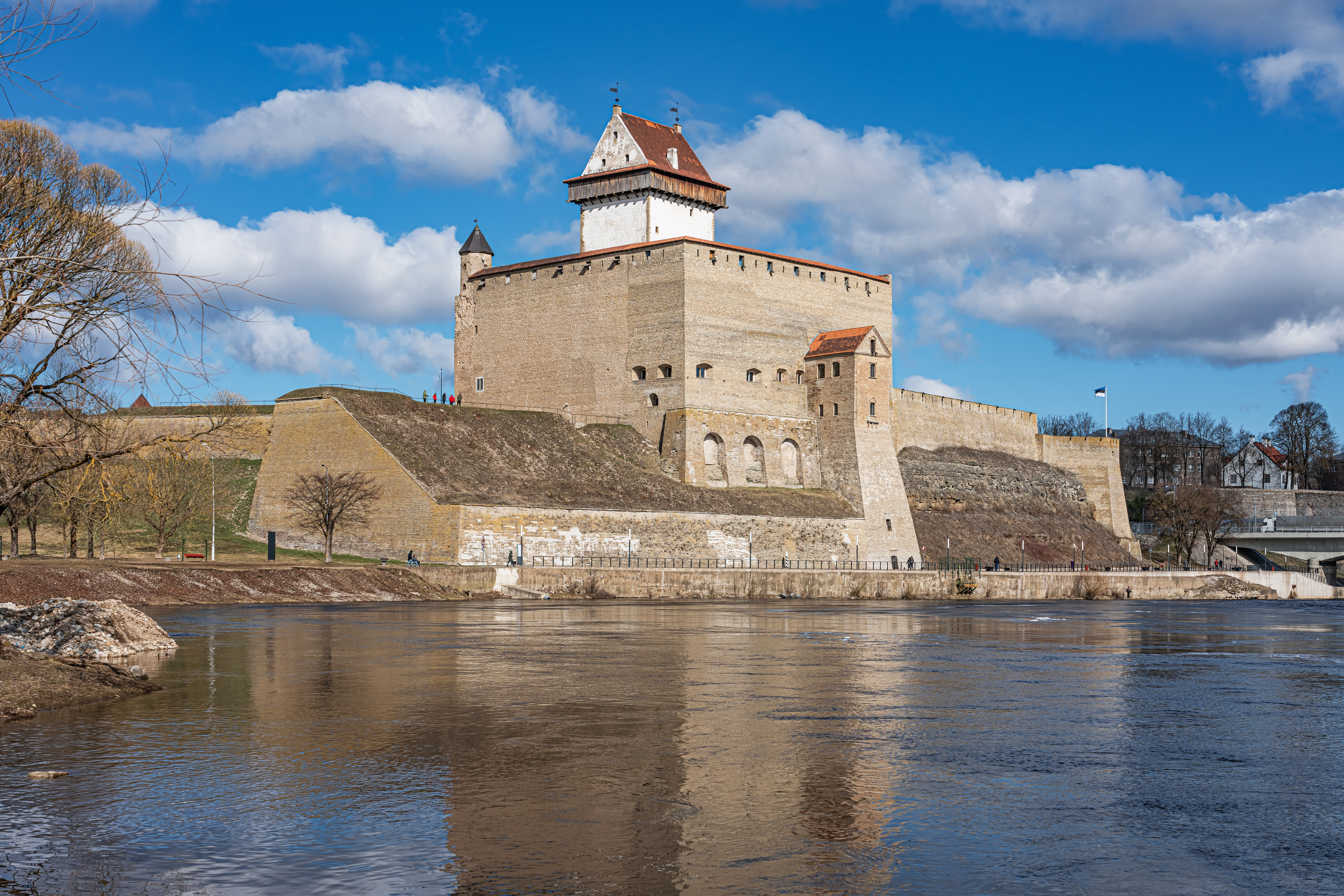

- Flag Coat of arms

- Country: Estonia
- Capital: Jõhvi
- Largest town: Narva

Area
  - Total: 2,972 km^{2} (1,147 sq mi)

Population (2025)
  - Total: 130,156
  - Rank: 3rd
  - Density: 43.79/km^{2} (113.4/sq mi)

Ethnicity
  - Russians: 68.5%
  - Estonians: 20.3%
  - Ukrainians: 5%
  - other: 5.7%

GDP
  - Total: €2.631 billion (2022)
  - Per capita: €19,778 (2022)
- ISO 3166 code: EE-45
- Vehicle registration: I

Ida-Viru County (Estonian: Ida-Viru maakond) is one of the 15 counties of Estonia. It is the most northeastern part of the country. The county contains large deposits of oil shale – the main mineral mined in Estonia. Oil shale is used in the production of shale oil and in thermal power plants. The capital of the county is the town of Jõhvi which is administratively united with the Jõhvi Parish; nevertheless, Narva is the largest town in the county in terms of population and at the same time the third-largest city in Estonia after Tallinn and Tartu.

In January 2019, Ida-Viru County had a population of 136,240 – constituting 10.3% of the total population in Estonia. It borders Lääne-Viru County in the west, Jõgeva County in the southwest and Russia (Leningrad Oblast) in the east. It is the only county in Estonia where Russians constitute the majority of population (73.1% in 2010), the second highest being Harju (28%).

== History ==
On 1 January 1990, Kohtla-Järve County was established within the boundaries of the current Kohtla-Järve district, which was renamed Ida-Viru County in March of the same year.

County Government (Estonian: maavalitsus), led by a governor (Estonian: maavanem), ceased to exist after administrative reform in 2017. The last governor of Ida-Viru county was Andres Noormägi.

== Demographics ==
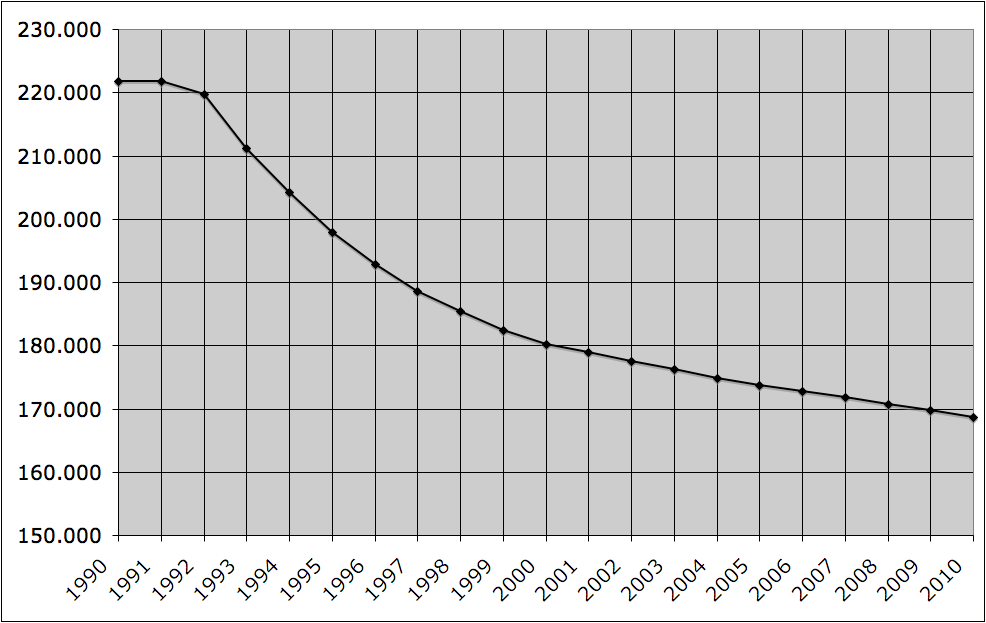
The population of Ida-Viru county declined from 221,807 in 1990 to 168,656 in 2010.

In January 2017, the population of Ida-Virumaa was 143,880, which makes it the third largest county in Estonia (after Harju and Tartu counties, which include the capital Tallinn and country's second-largest city Tartu). 44.6% of the population are men and 55.4% women.

By January 2020, the population of Ida-Virumaa had decreased to 134,259, of whom 33% were of native origin and 67% of foreign origin.

As a result of migration, Ida-Viru County is now the only county in Estonia where ethnic Russians have become a majority.

By ethnic origin, on 1 January 2017, 73.1% of the population were Russians, 18.9% were Estonians, 2.3% were Ukrainians, 2.1% were Belarusians, and 0.9% were Finns.

According to the 2021 Estonian census, the population of Ida-Virumaa was 132,741. By ethnic origin, 97,231 (73.25%) were Russians, 24,490 (18.45%) were Estonians, 3,265 (2.46%) were Ukrainians, 2,720 (2.05%) were Belarusians, and 1,065 (0.80%) were Finns. Estonians are predominant in the more rural parishes to the west of country: Alutaguse (69.47%), Toila (64.27%), and Lüganuse (55.07%).

== Religion ==
The following congregations of the Estonian Evangelical Lutheran Church (EELC) operate in Ida-Viru County under the Viru Deanery of the EELC: Iisaku congregation, Illaku congregation, Jõhvi congregation, Lüganuse congregation, Narva congregation, Narva-Jõesuu congregation, Pühajõe congregation and Tudulinna congregation.

Regarding Eastern Orthodoxy, the following Orthodox congregations operate under the jurisdiction of the Estonian Orthodox Church of the Moscow Patriarchate: Alajõe, Jaama, Jõhvi, Kiviõli, Kohtla-Järve, Lohusuu, Vasknarva, the congregation of the Narva Cathedral of the Resurrection of Christ and three other Orthodox parishes in the city of Narva and two congregations in Narva-Jõesuu.

A Russian Orthodox convent, Pühtitsa Convent, is located in Ida-Viru County.

The congregations belonging to the Catholic Church in Estonia that operate in Ida-Viru County are: Ahtme, Narva, Sillamäe, Kiviõli and Sompa and Kohtla-Järve.

Baptist congregations operating in Ida-Viru County: Kiviõli, Sillamäe, four congregations in the city of Kohtla-Järve and two congregations in Narva.

Of the other Christian churches, there are four Methodist congregations, one Pentecostal congregation, two Adventist congregations and one Jehovah's Witnesses congregation.

Religious affiliations in Ida-Viru County, census 2000–2021*
Religion	2000		2011		2021	
Religion	Number	%	Number	%	Number	%
Christianity	54,269	36.2	63,141	48.9	58,530	50.6
—Orthodox Christians	43,302	28.5	55,840	42.2	53,180	46.0
—Lutherans	7,946	5.3	4,623	3.6	2,440	2,1
—Catholics	1,145	0.7	815	0.6	1,110	0.9
—Baptists	675	0.4	379	0.2	200	0.1
—Jehovah's Witnesses	282	0.2	342	0.2	320	0.2
—Pentecostals	504	0.3	318	0.2	400	0.3
—Old Believers	108	0.007	158	0.1	130	0.1
—Methodists	172	0.1	140	0.1	160	0.1
—Adventists	135	0.1	111	0.1	80	0.1
—Other Christians	-	-	415	0.2	510	0.4
Islam	-	-	244	0.2	700	0.6
Buddhism	-	-	35	0.02	30	0.02
Other religions**	590	0.3	438	0.2	740	0.6
No religion	50,551	33.7	42,754	33.1	40,250	34.8
Not stated***	44,362	29.5	22,436	17.4	15,400	13.3
Total population*	150,049		129,049		115,650	
*The censuses of Estonia count the religious affiliations of the population older than 15 years of age.

== Municipalities ==
Ida-Virumaa County is subdivided into seven municipalities, of which four are urban (Estonian: linnad — cities or towns) and three are rural (Estonian: vallad — parishes). There are 217 villages in Ida-Virumaa.

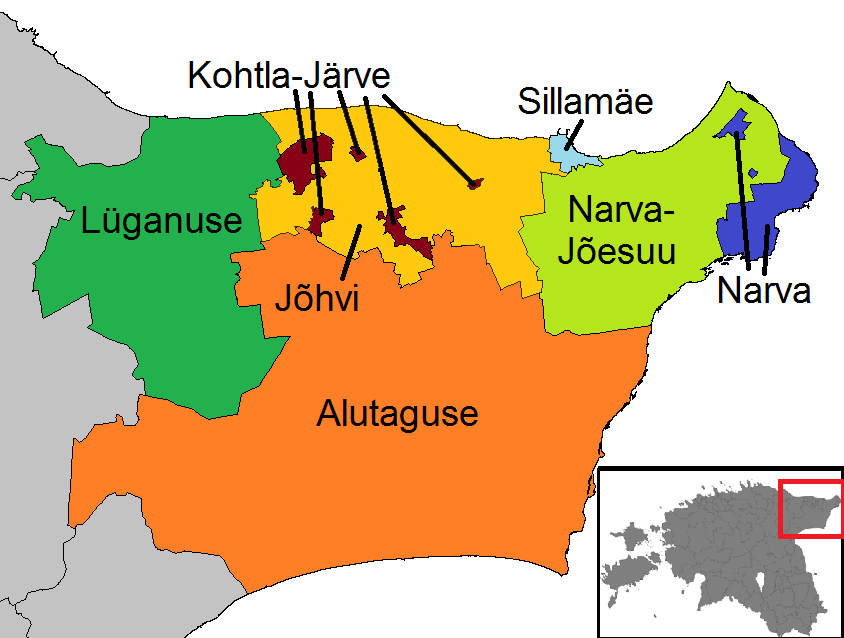
Municipalities of Ida-Viru County

Rank	Municipality	Type	Population (2018)	Area km^{2}	Density
1	Alutaguse Parish	Rural	4,929	1,465	3.4
2	Jõhvi Parish	Rural	16,452	390	42.2
3	Kohtla-Järve	Urban	35,395	39	907.6
4	Lüganuse Parish	Rural	8,942	599	14.9
5	Narva	Urban	58,610	85	689.5
6	Narva-Jõesuu	Urban	4,828	411	11.7
7	Sillamäe	Urban	13,406	11	1,218.7

== Landmarks ==
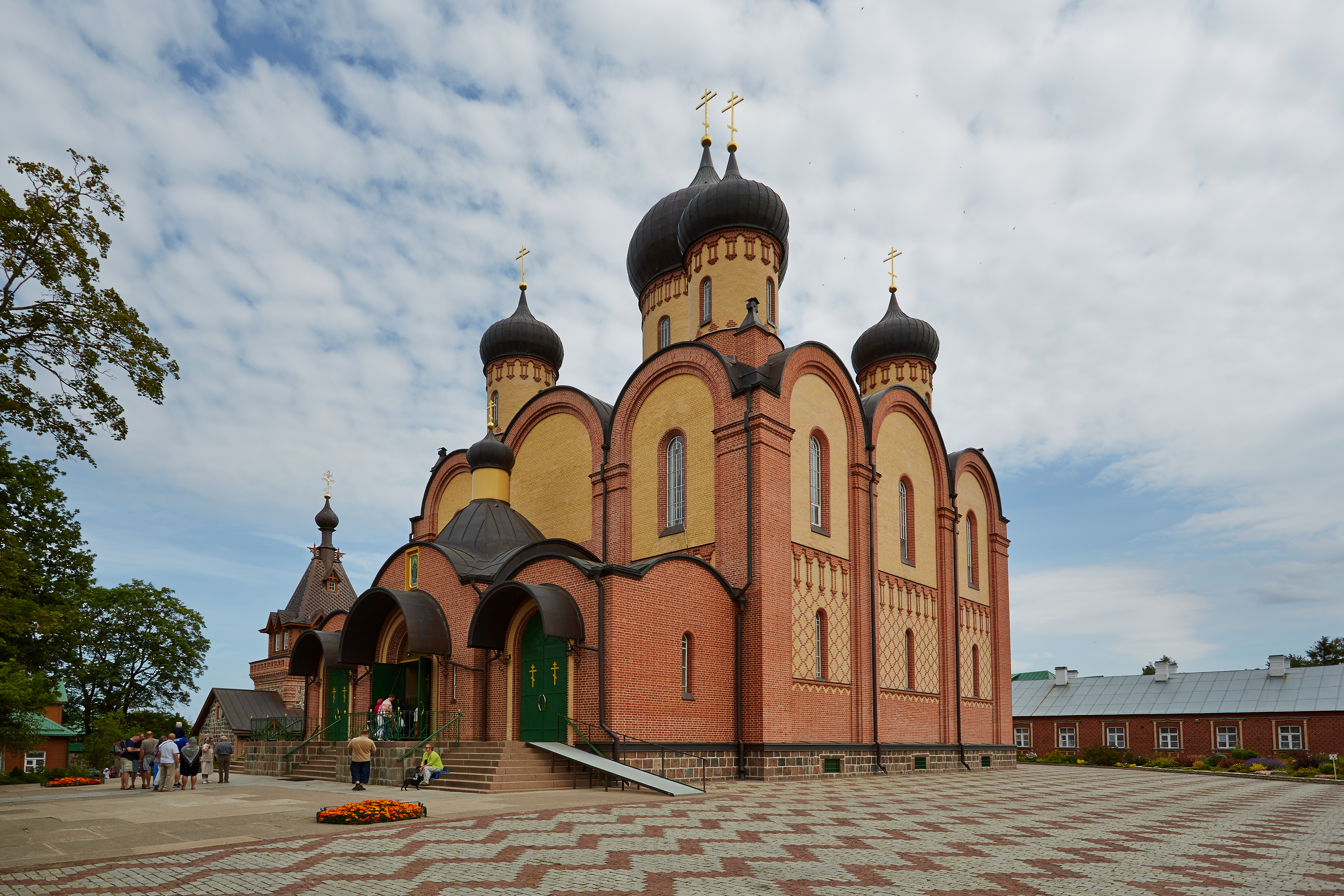
Pühtitsa Convent

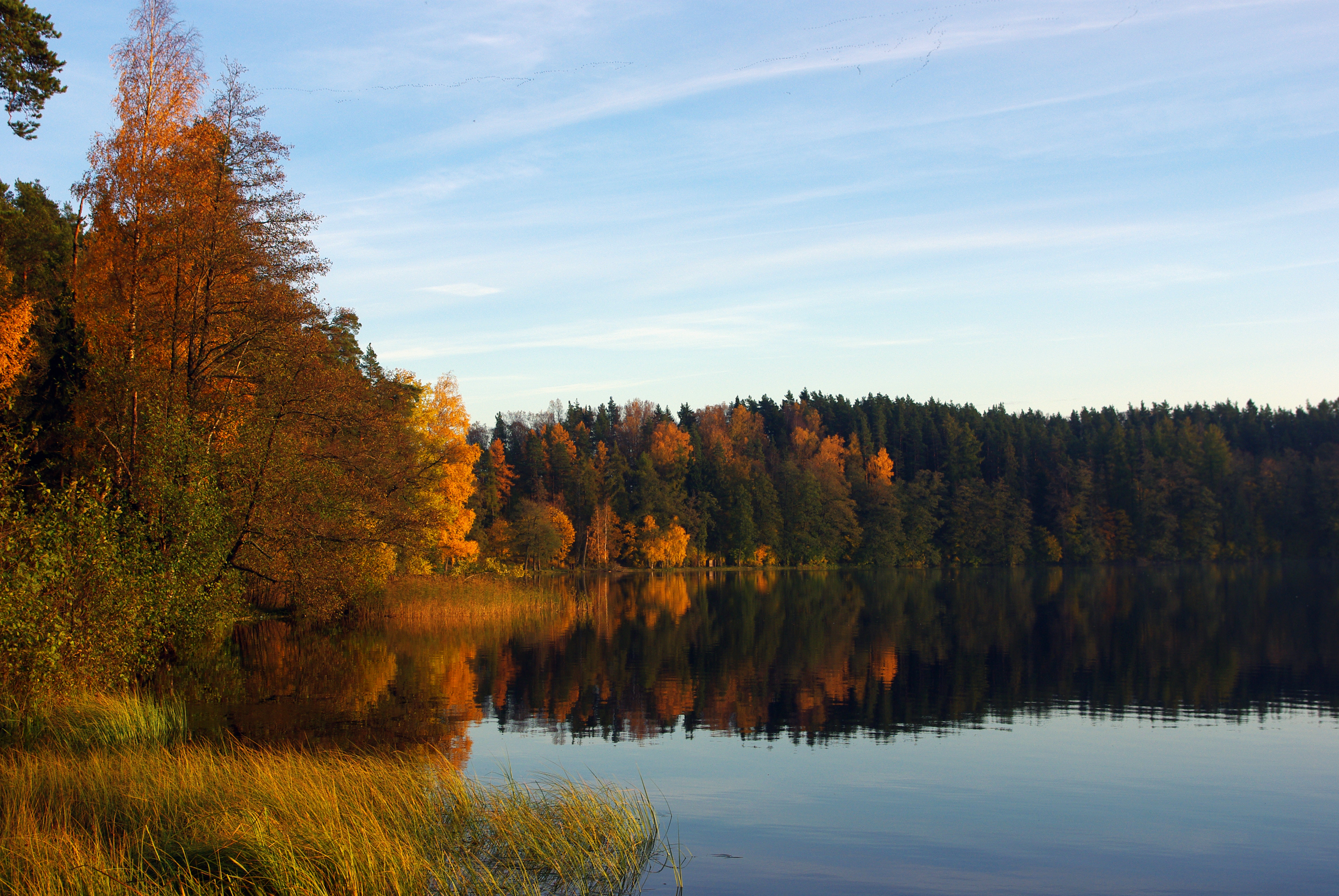
Lake Uljaste

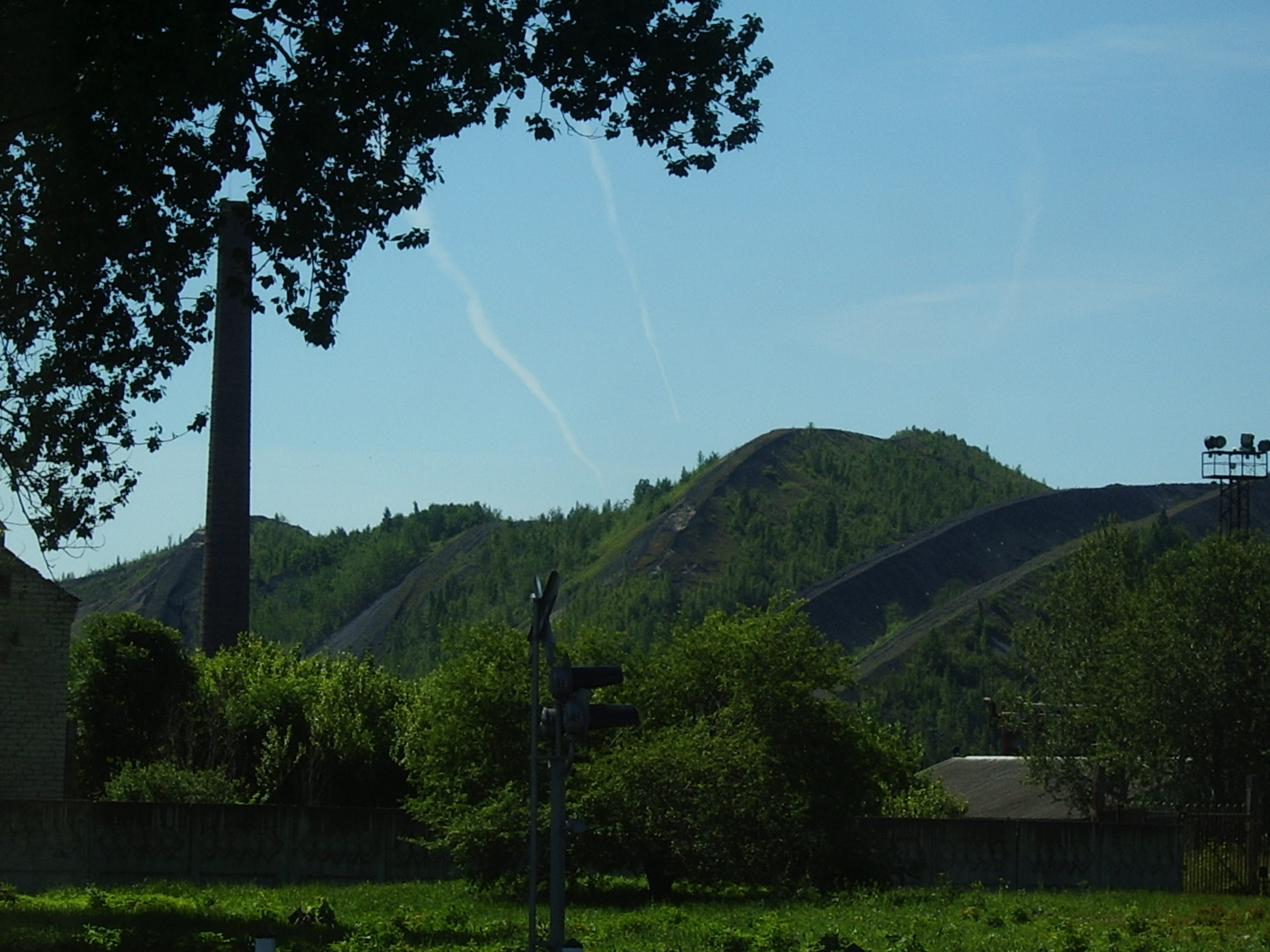
Ash hills in Ida-Viru County

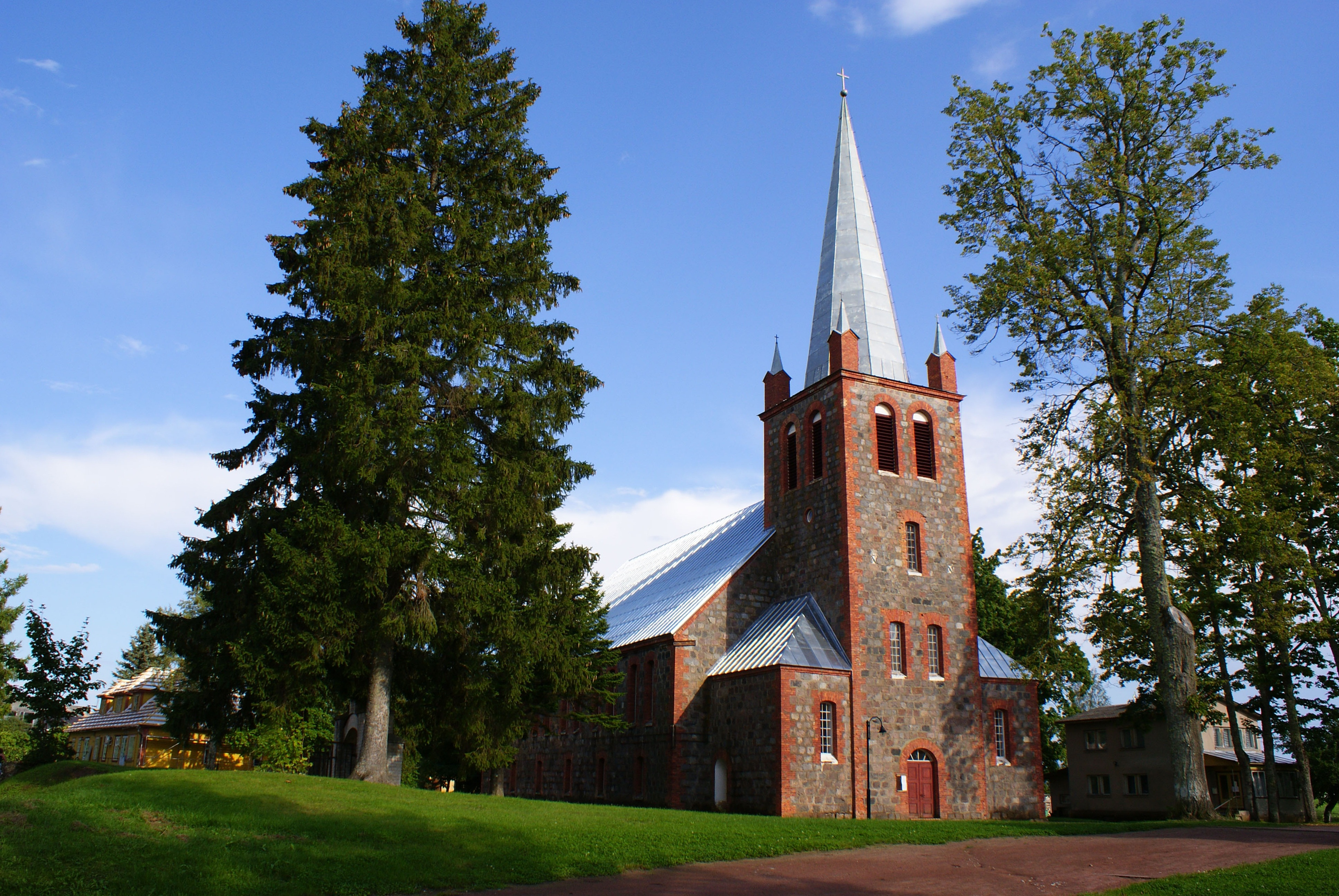
Avinurme church

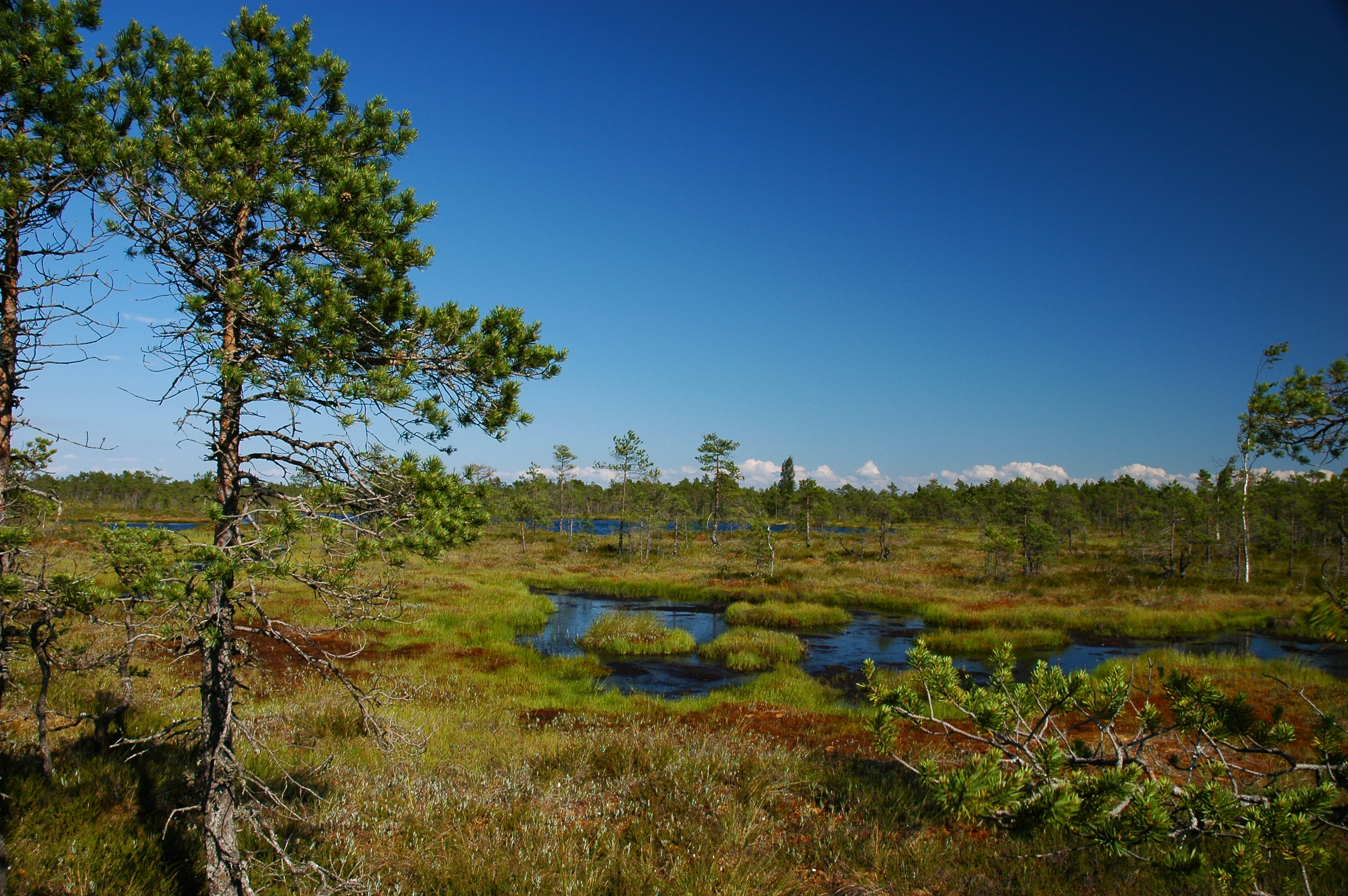
Selisoo bog

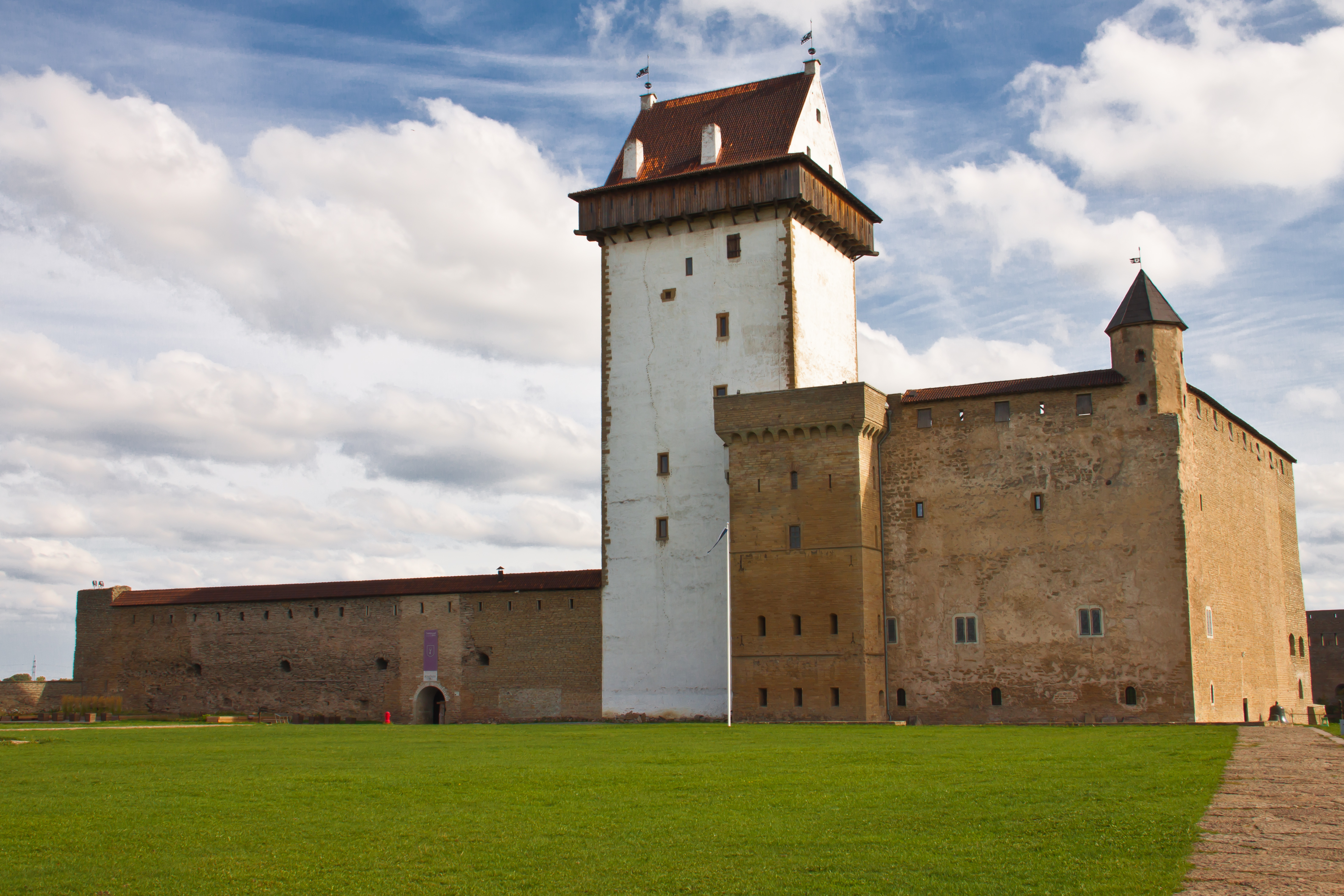
Hermann Castle

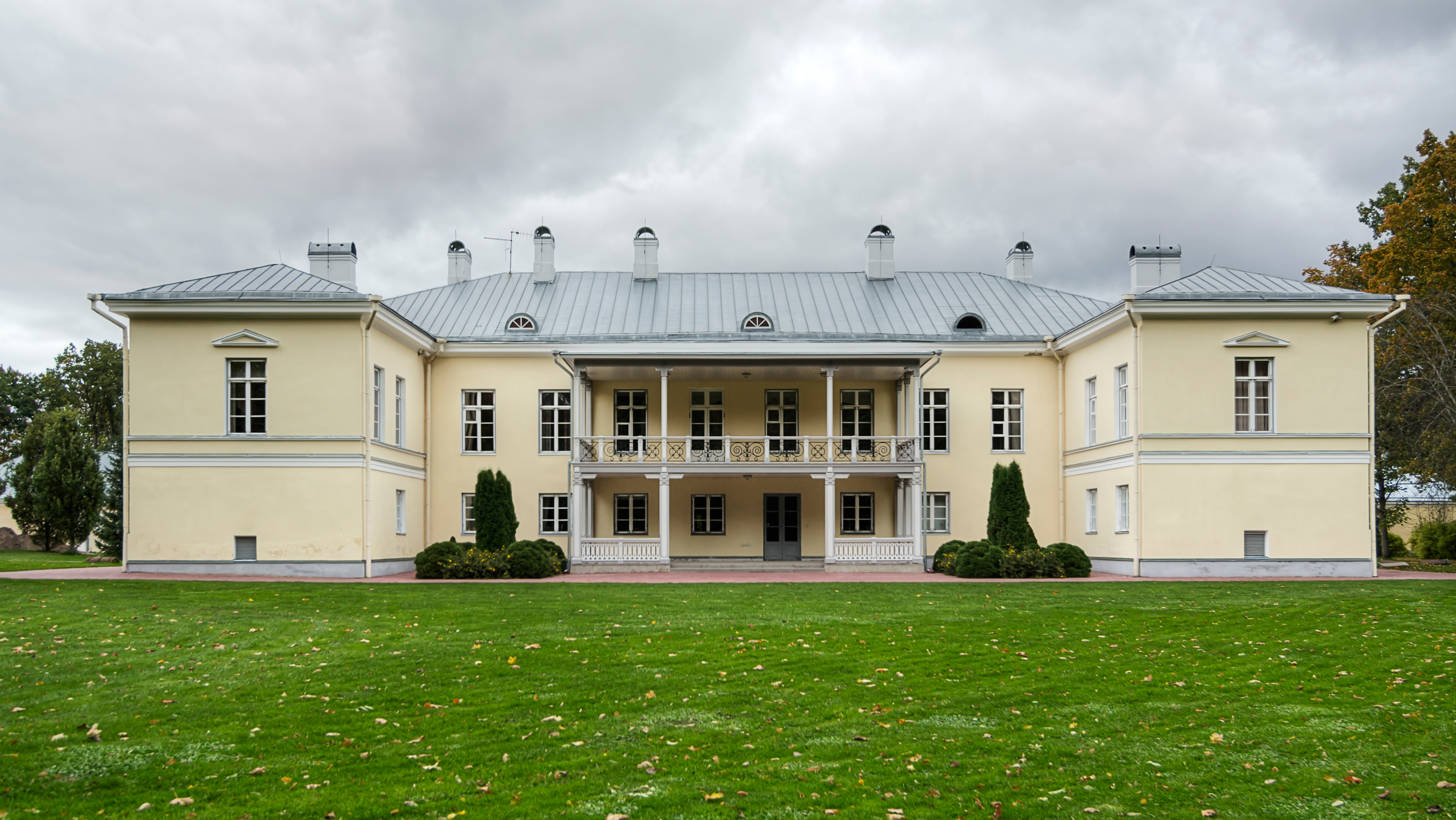
Mäetaguse manor house

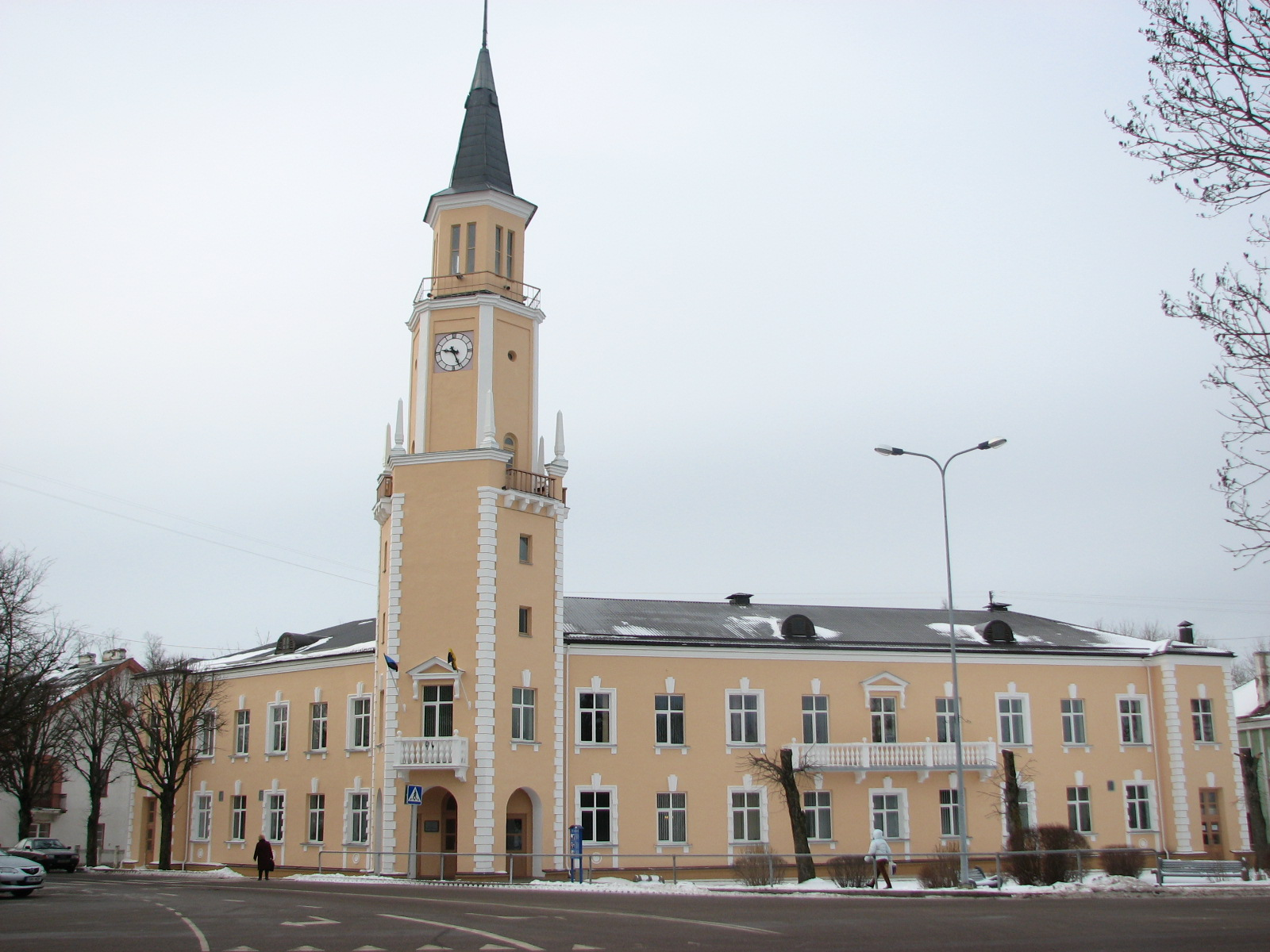
Sillamäe town hall
