= Tõreska =

Village in Estonia

Coordinates: 59°25′03″N 25°51′31″E

- Village
- Interactive map of Tõreska
- Country: Estonia
- County: Harju County
- Parish: Kuusalu Parish
- Time zone: UTC+2 (EET)
  - Summer (DST): UTC+3 (EEST)

Tõreska is a village in Kuusalu Parish, Harju County in northeast Estonia.

The entire territory of the village is occupied by Keskpolügoon, the central training area of the Estonian Defence Forces.
