= Kaarel Heinver =

Estonian politician

Kaarel Heinver (born Kaarel Uurmann; 22 March 1886 in Uurita, Kuusalu Parish – 1961 Loksa Selsoviet) was an Estonian politician. He was a member of VI Riigikogu (its National Council) and the first mayor of the former Kõnnu Municipality.
