= Kolgu =

Village in Estonia

Coordinates: 59°18′N 25°52′E

- Village
- Interactive map of Kolgu
- Country: Estonia
- County: Harju County
- Parish: Kuusalu Parish
- Time zone: UTC+2 (EET)
  - Summer (DST): UTC+3 (EEST)

Kolgu is a village in Kuusalu Parish, Harju County in northern Estonia. It lies on the Valgejõgi River, just northwest of the town of Tapa.

The western part, which is about half of the villages territory, is occupied by Keskpolügoon, the central training area of the Estonian Defence Forces.
