= Kuusalu (village) =

Village in Estonia

- Village
- Location in Estonia
- Coordinates: 59°27′15″N 25°26′21″E
- Country: Estonia
- County: Harju County
- Municipality: Kuusalu Parish

Population (01.01.2010)
  - Total: 221

Kuusalu is a village in Kuusalu Parish, Harju County in northern Estonia. It has a population of 221 (as of 1 January 2010).

== Gallery ==
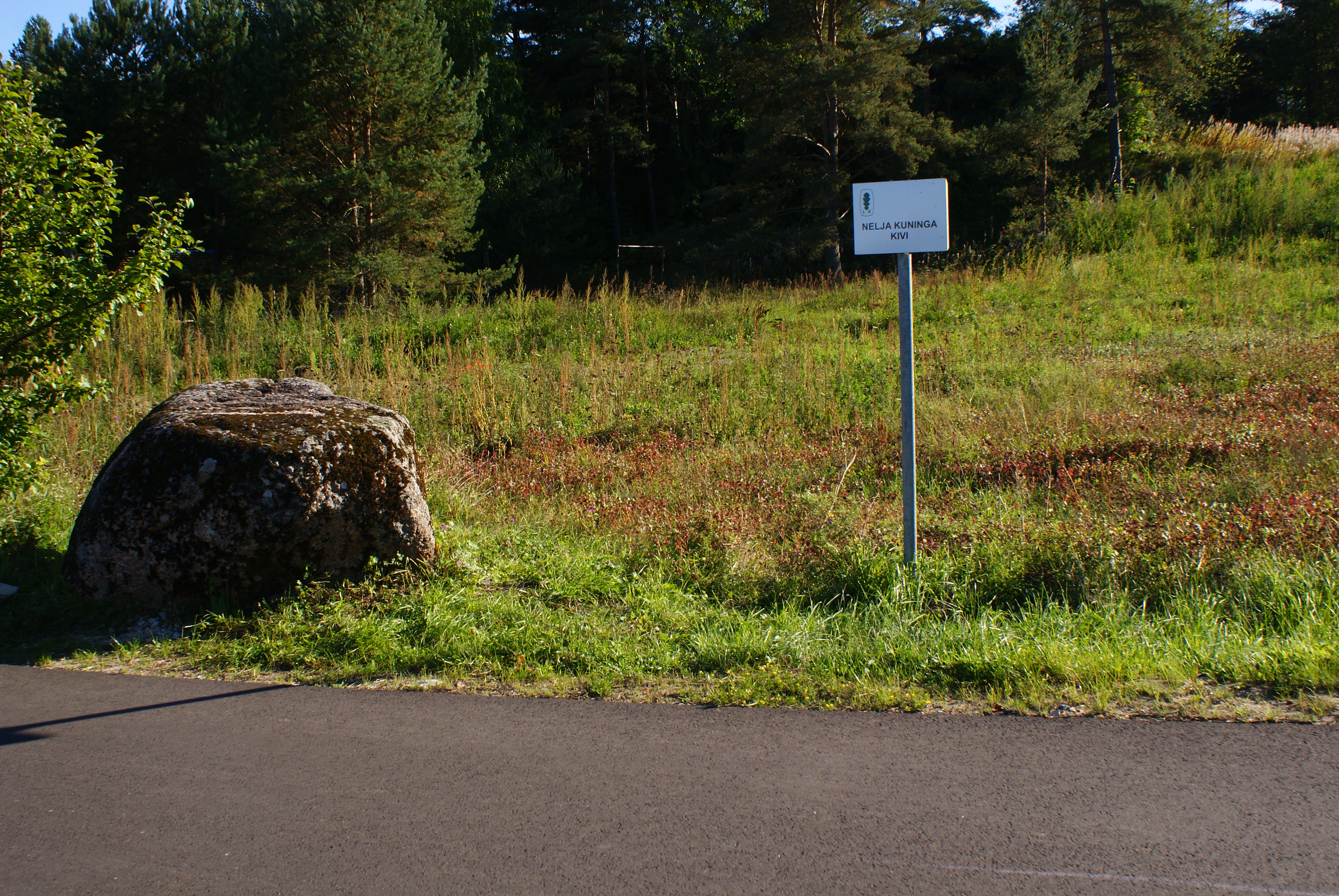
Stone to Four Kings

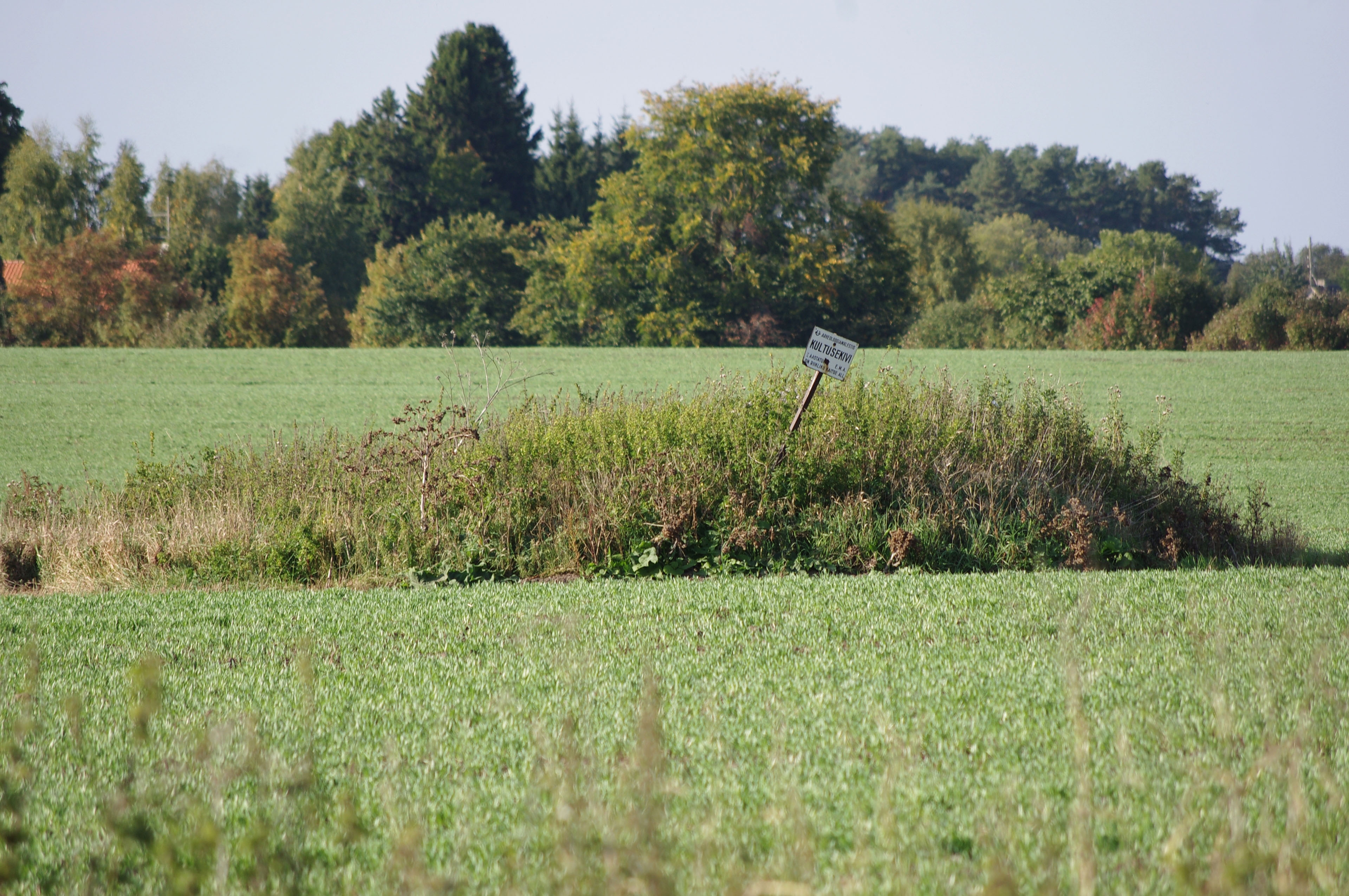
Offering stone

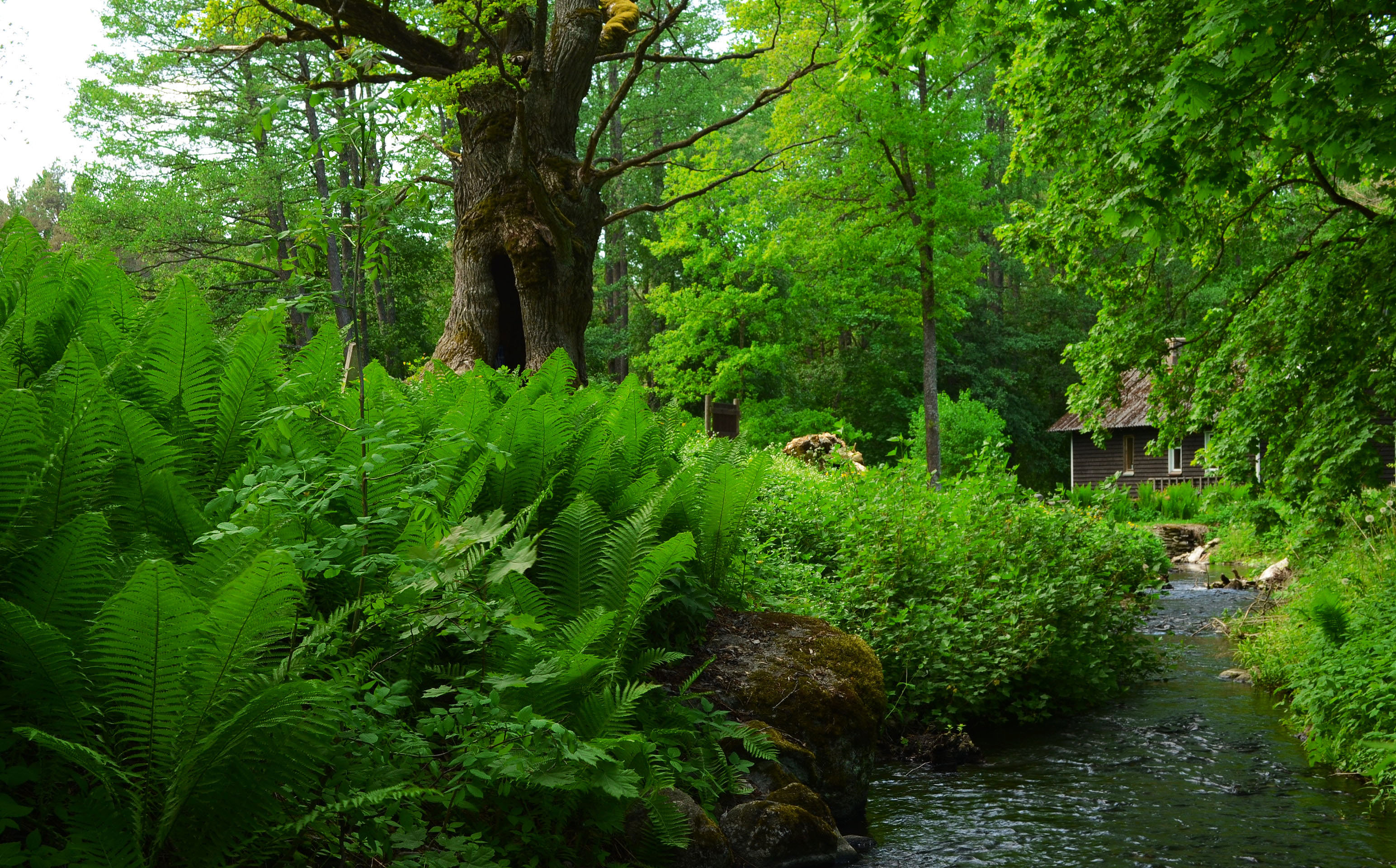
Tülivere Oak

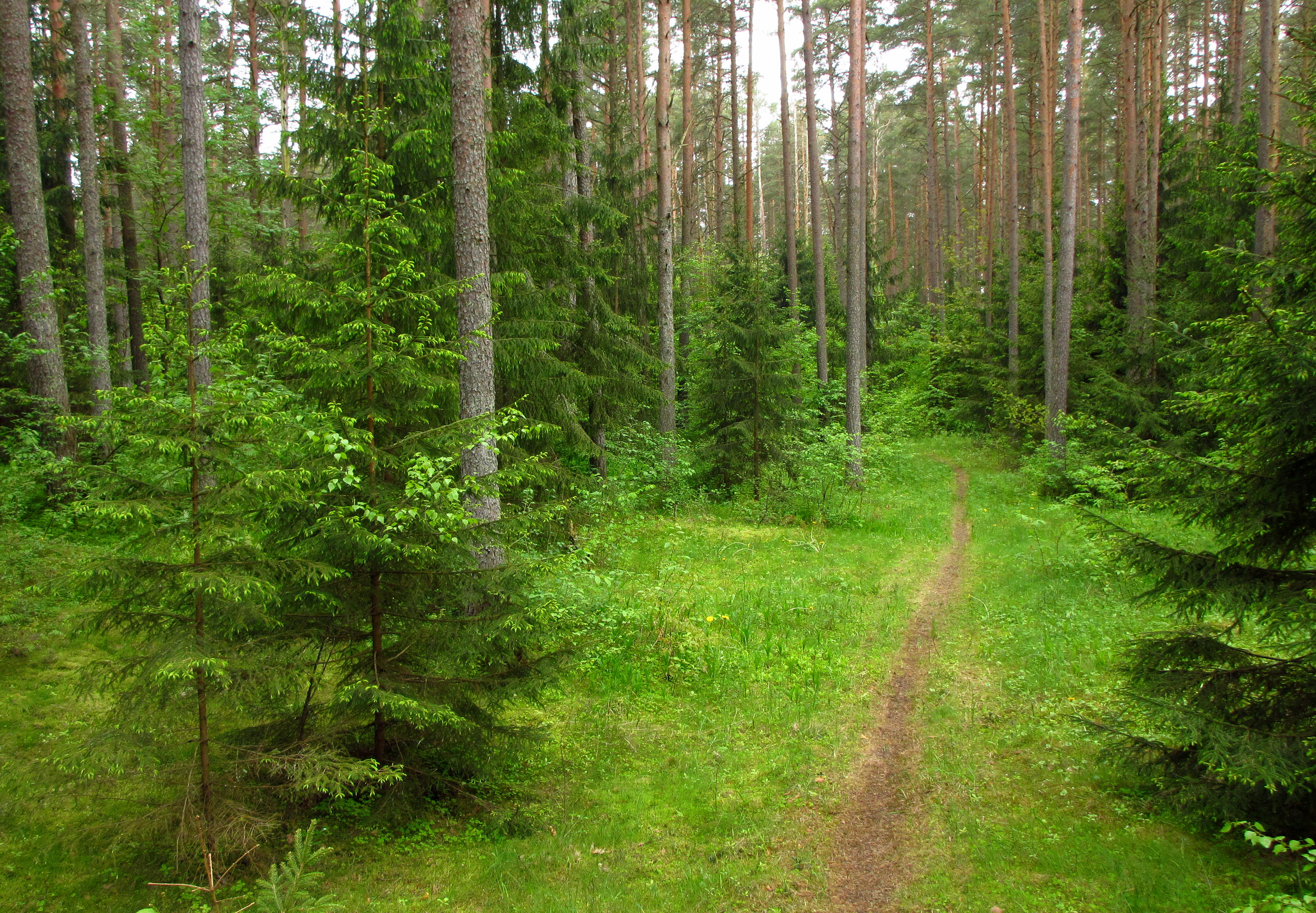
Võnsi pine forest
