= Rehatse =

Village in Estonia

- Village
- Location within Estonia
- Coordinates: 59°25′N 25°26′E
- Country: Estonia
- County: Harju County
- Parish: Kuusalu Parish
- Time zone: UTC+2 (EET)
  - Summer (DST): UTC+3 (EEST)

Rehatse is a village in Kuusalu Parish, Harju County in northern Estonia.
