= Pudisoo =

Village in Estonia

Coordinates: 59°31′N 25°34′E

- Village
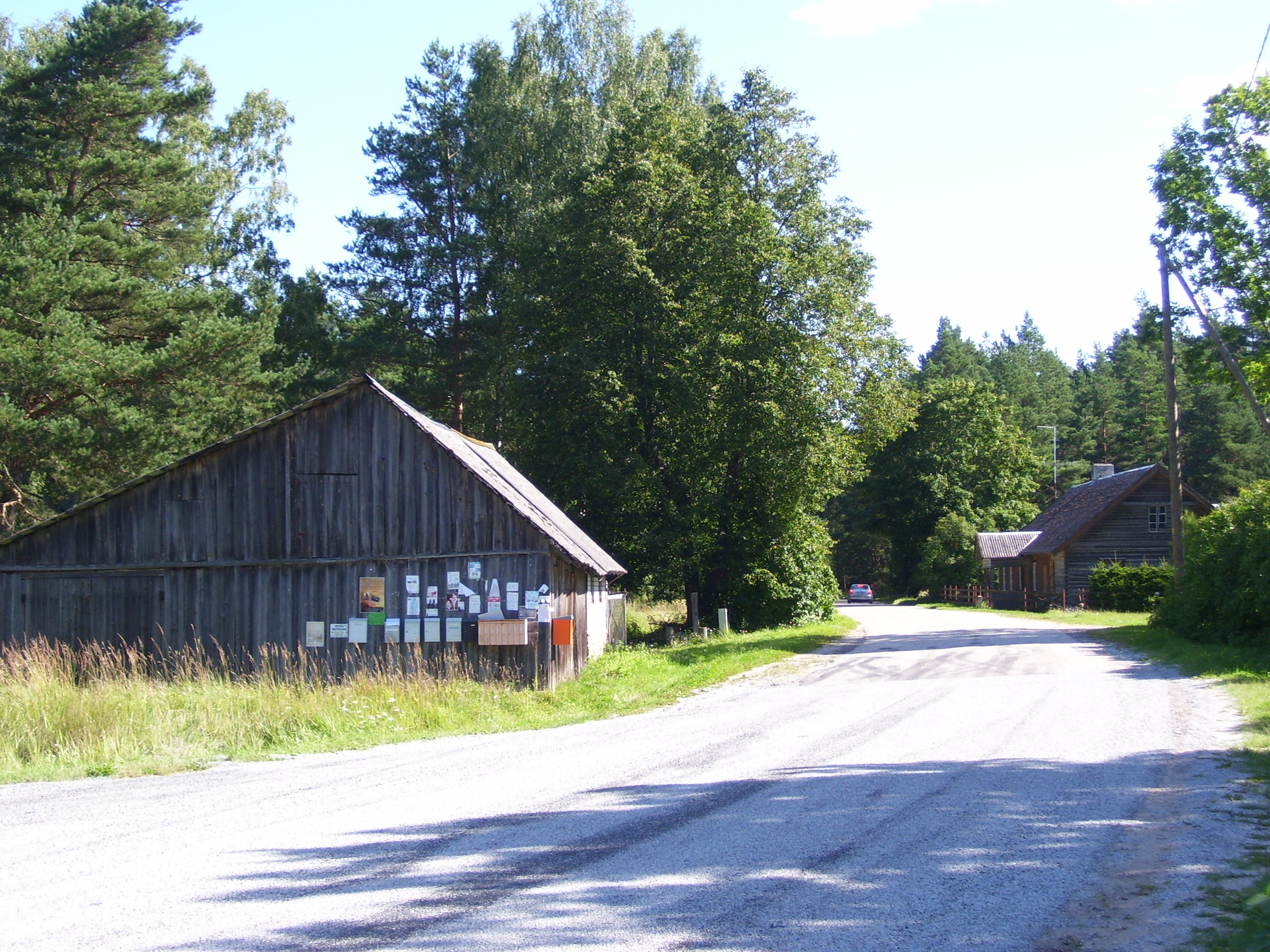
- Pudisoo
- Interactive map of Pudisoo
- Country: Estonia
- County: Harju County
- Parish: Kuusalu Parish
- Time zone: UTC+2 (EET)
  - Summer (DST): UTC+3 (EEST)

Pudisoo is a village in Kuusalu Parish, Harju County in northern Estonia, on the territory of Lahemaa National Park.
