= Jussi Lakes =

Group of lakes in Estonia

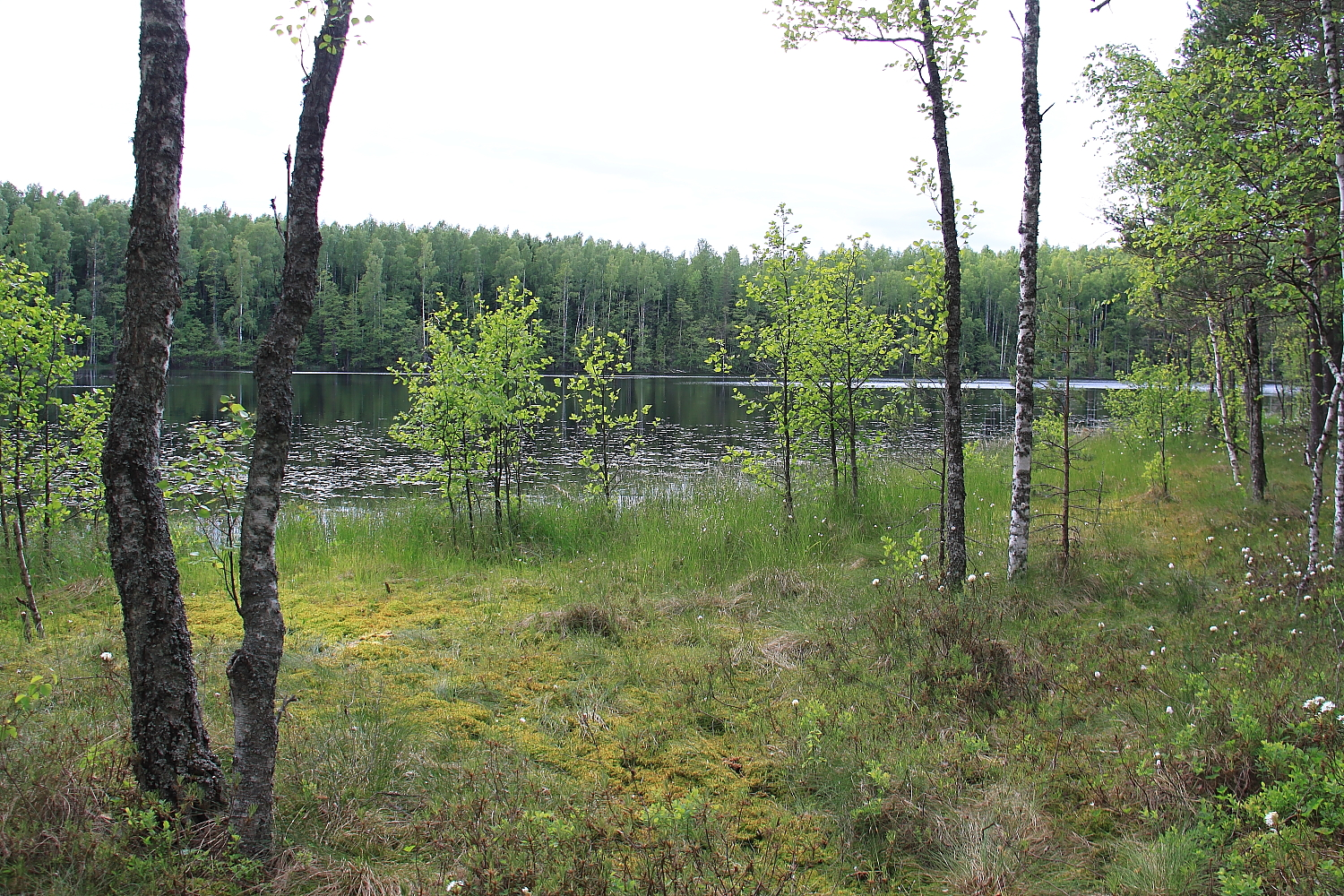
Väinjärv

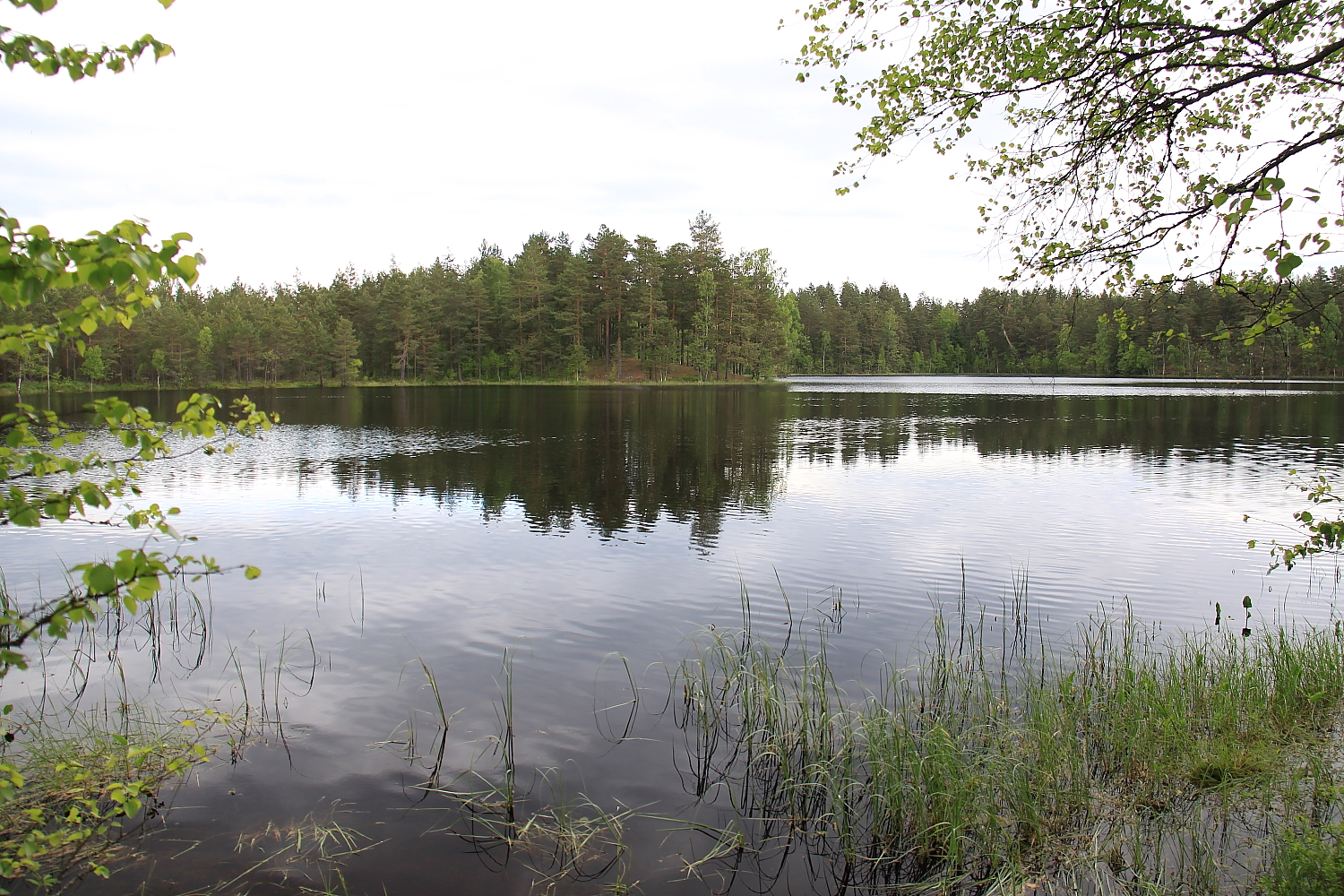
Linajärv

The Jussi Lakes are six lakes in Kuusalu Parish, Harju County, Estonia. The lakes are located in the Põhja-Kõrvemaa Nature Reserve.

These lakes are:

1. Kõverjärv, 7.2 hectares (18 acres)
2. Linajärv, 5.5 hectares (14 acres)
3. Mustjärv, 2.0 hectares (4.9 acres)
4. Pikkjärv, 6.4 hectares (16 acres)
5. Suurjärv, 18.6 hectares (46 acres)
6. Väinjärv, 5.8 hectares (14 acres)

== See also ==
- List of lakes of Estonia
