= Külmaallika =

Village in Estonia

Coordinates: 59°25′N 25°22′E

- Village
- Interactive map of Külmaallika
- Country: Estonia
- County: Harju County
- Parish: Kuusalu Parish
- Time zone: UTC+2 (EET)
  - Summer (DST): UTC+3 (EEST)

Külmaallika is a village in Kuusalu Parish, Harju County, in northern Estonia.
