= Murksi =

Village in Estonia

Coordinates: 59°29′51″N 25°44′07″E

- Village
- Interactive map of Murksi
- Country: Estonia
- County: Harju County
- Parish: Kuusalu Parish
- Time zone: UTC+2 (EET)
  - Summer (DST): UTC+3 (EEST)

Murksi is a village in Kuusalu Parish, Harju County in northern Estonia.
