= Kemba, Estonia =

Village in Estonia

Coordinates: 59°27′N 25°43′E

Kemba
- Village
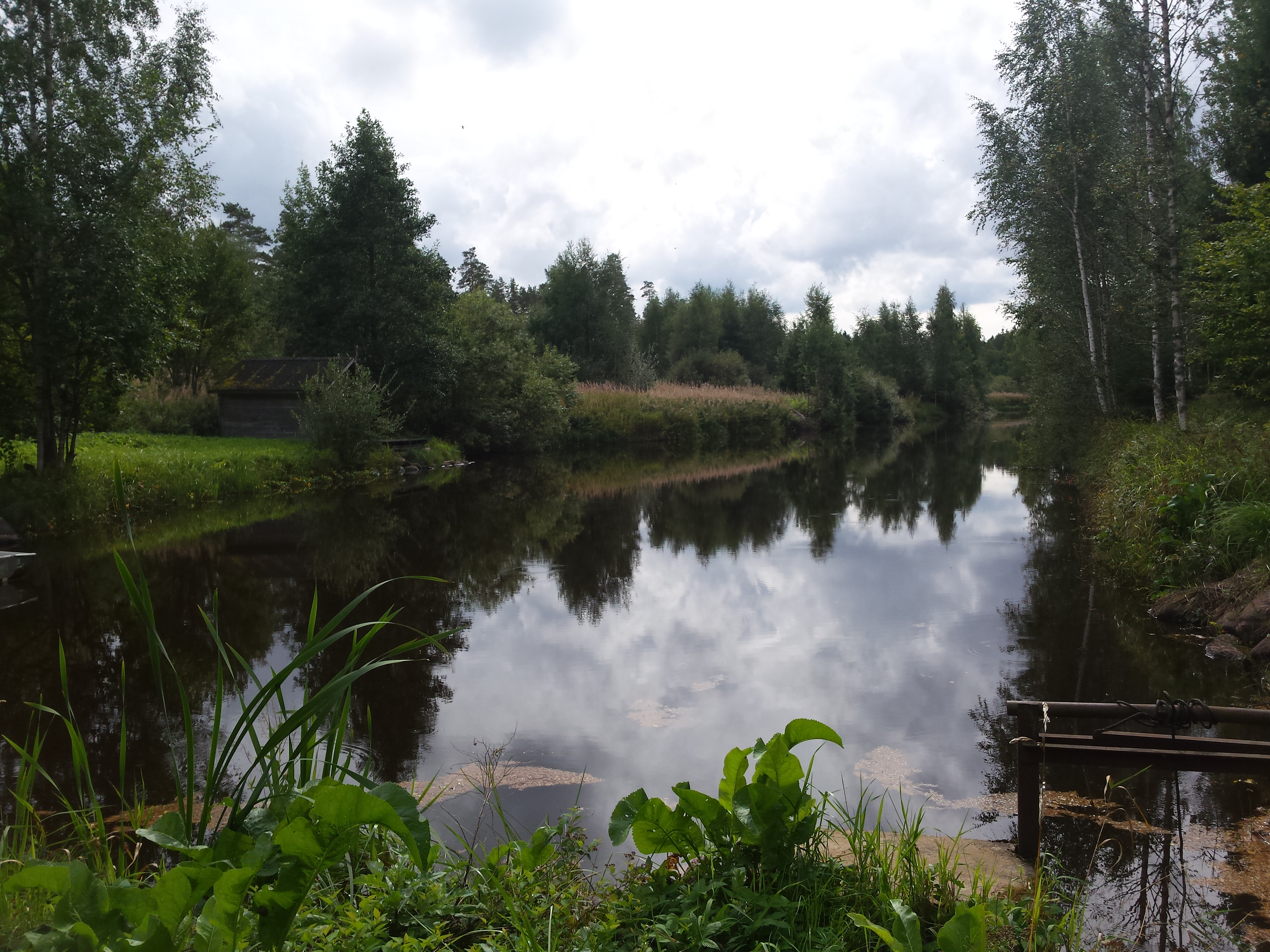
- Kemba reservoir
- Interactive map of Kemba
- Country: Estonia
- County: Harju County
- Parish: Kuusalu Parish
- Time zone: UTC+2 (EET)
  - Summer (DST): UTC+3 (EEST)

Kemba is a village in Kuusalu Parish, Harju County in northern Estonia.
