= Suru Suursoo =

Swamp in Estonia

Coordinates: 59.410°N 25.704°E

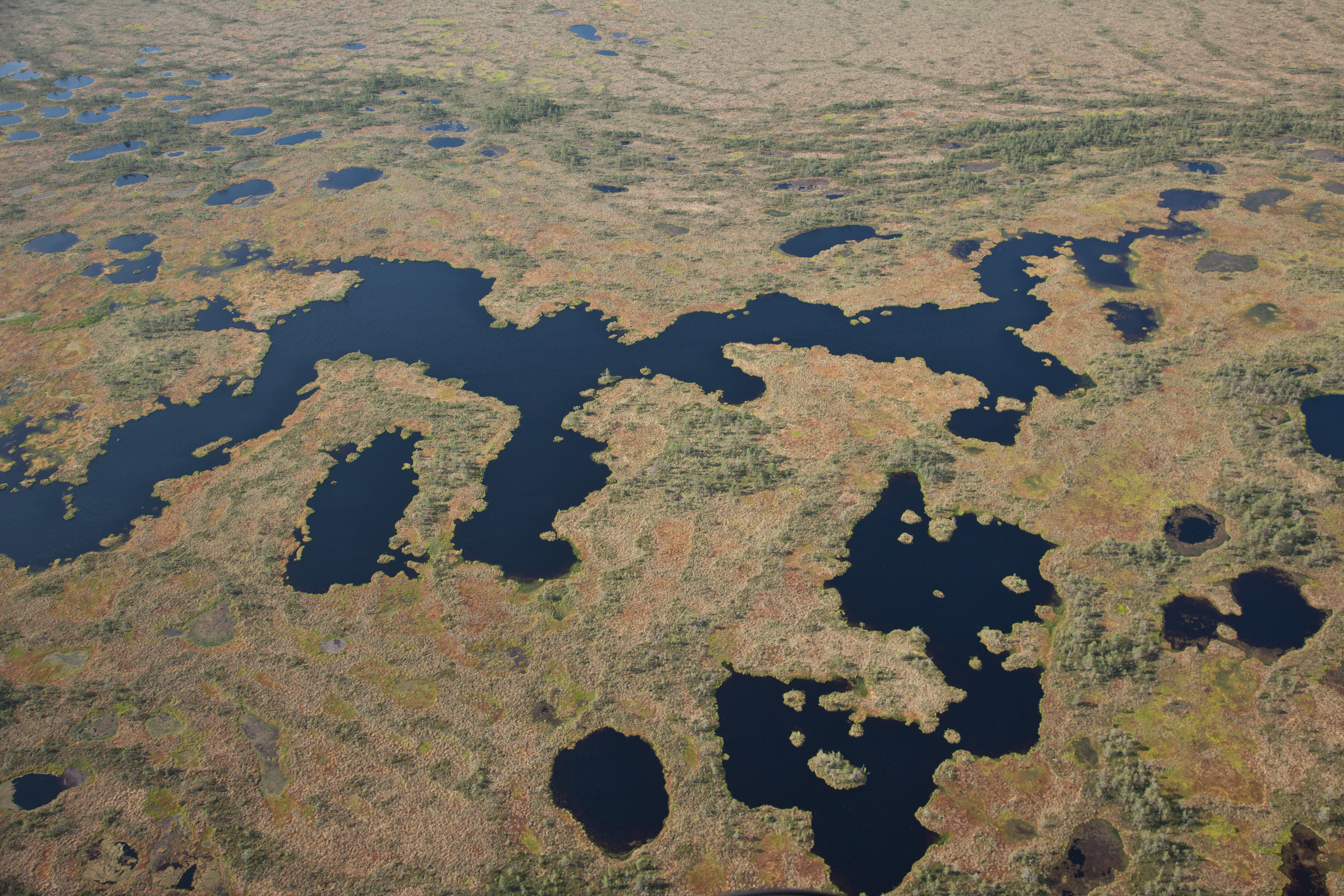
Suru Suursoo

Suru Suursoo is a bog in Harju County, Estonia. The bog is part of Põhja-Kõrvemaa Nature Reserve.

The area of the bog is 2557 ha.
