= Viru Bog =

Bog in Estonia

Coordinates: 59.473511°N 25.66174°E

Viru Bog is a bog in Harju County, Estonia within Lahemaa National Park.

The area of the bog is 235 ha.

Thickness of peat layer is about 6 m.

== Gallery ==
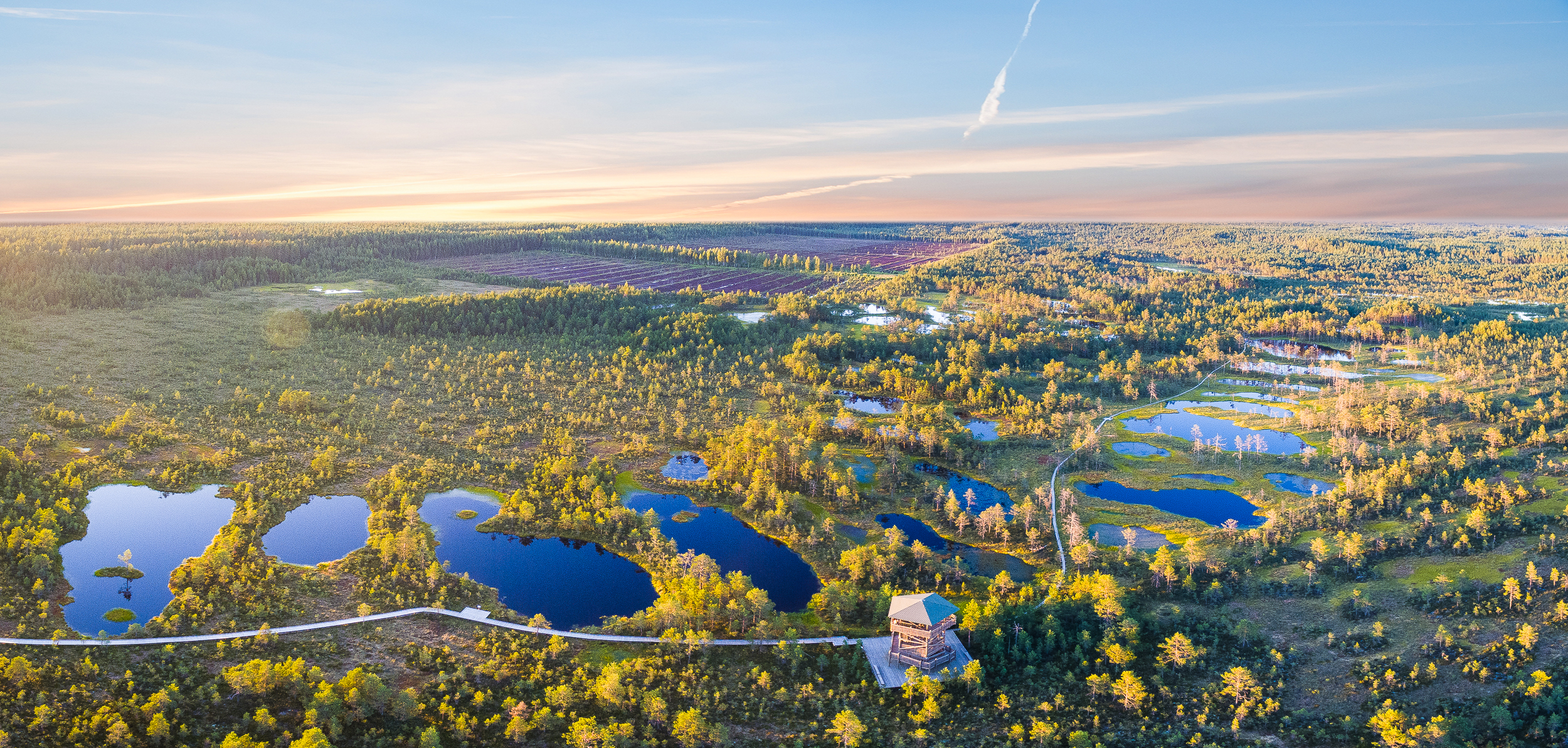
Viru bog, aerial photo

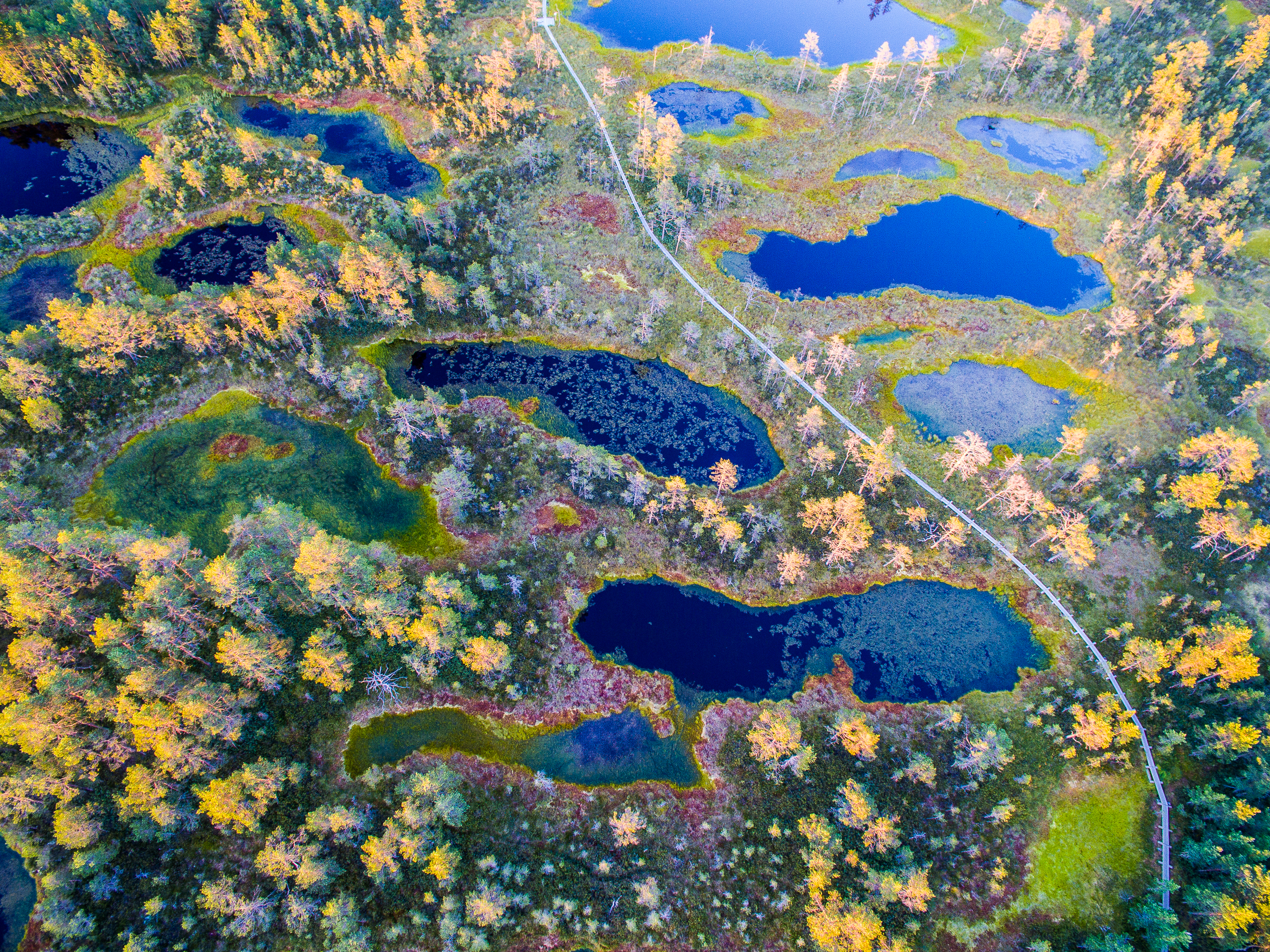
Viru bog, aerial photo

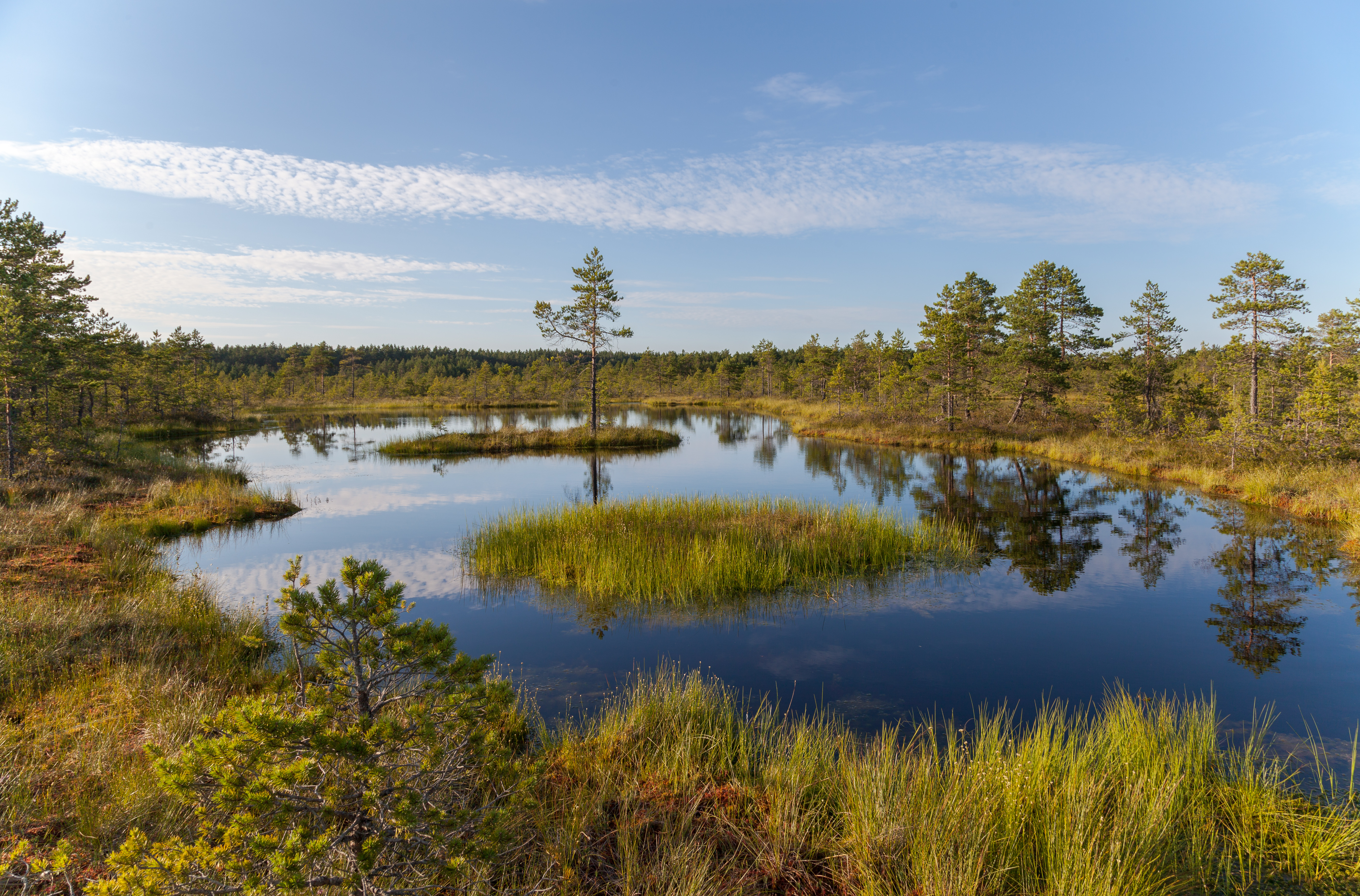
Viru Bog

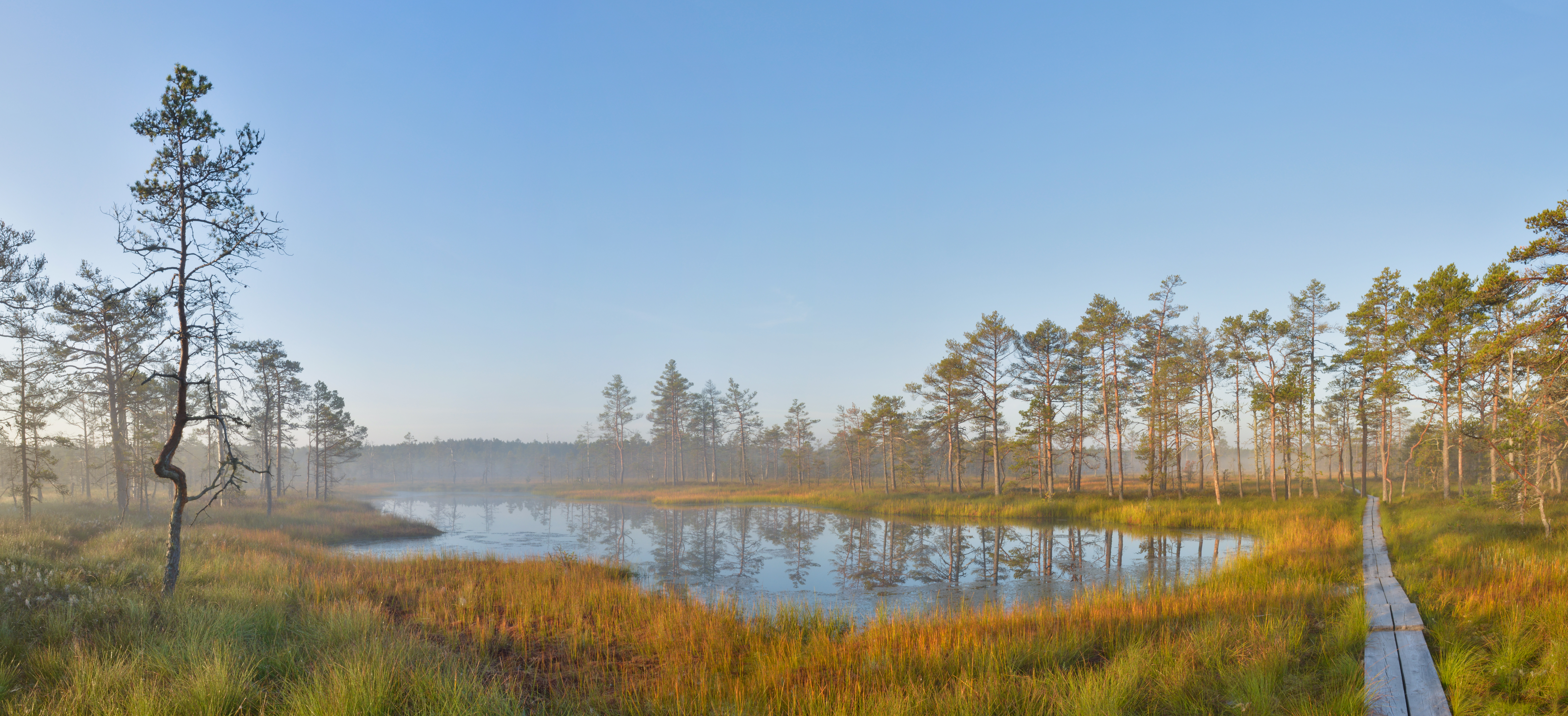
Viru Bog
