= Keskpolügoon =

Military training area in Estonia

Kaitseväe keskpolügoon Defence Forces central training area
- Near Tapa in Estonia
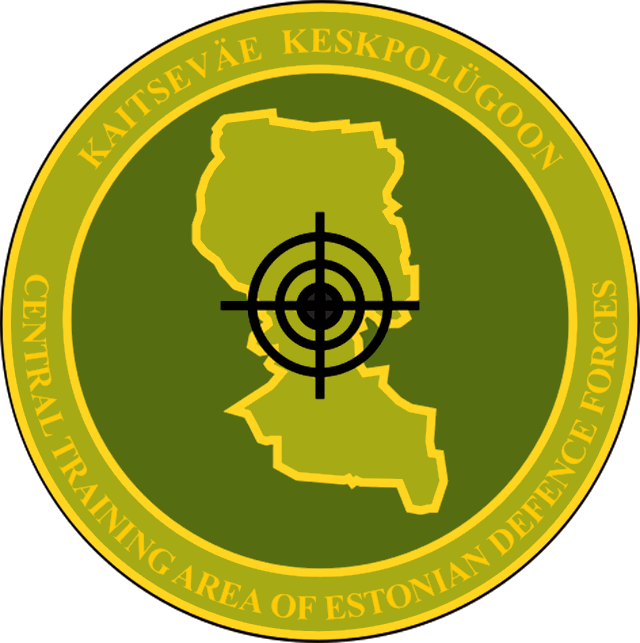

Site information
- Type: military training area
- Operator: Estonian Defence Forces
- Status: active

Location
- Coordinates: 59°22′N 25°50′E
- Area: 11,951 ha (29,530 acres)

Site history
- In use: 2008

Garrison information
- Garrison: Tapa Army Base

Test information
- Other tests: artillery

Keskpolügoon (English: 'central training area') is the main military training area of the six areas used by the Estonian Defence Forces. The Defense Forces central training area covers 11,951 ha (29,530 acres) and is located in the eastern part of the Kuusalu municipality in Harju County. It borders with three other rural municipalities: Kadrina to the east, Tapa to the south (both in Lääne-Viru County) and Anija Parish of Harju County to the south-west. To the west it borders the Põhja-Kõrvemaa Nature Reserve.

== Organization ==
The Keskpolügoon is part of the Logistic center The Keskpolügoon operates the training area according to civil agreements with the local municipalities, plans, and organizes the combat firing exercises, prepares and carries out practical training in the use of the armed forces in accordance with the requirements.

== History ==
During the Soviet occupation of Estonia, Central training area was part of the Soviet Army artillery and tank training area with the area of 33,100 ha. The area was in active use from 1952 to 1992.

=== Establishment ===
Keskpolügoon was created on 15 May 1997 and was officially established as the central training area of the Maavägi on 23 October 2001, with the Government Order No. 713 "Establishment of the Defense Forces Central training area."
