= Põhja-Kõrvemaa Nature Reserve =

Protected area in Estonia

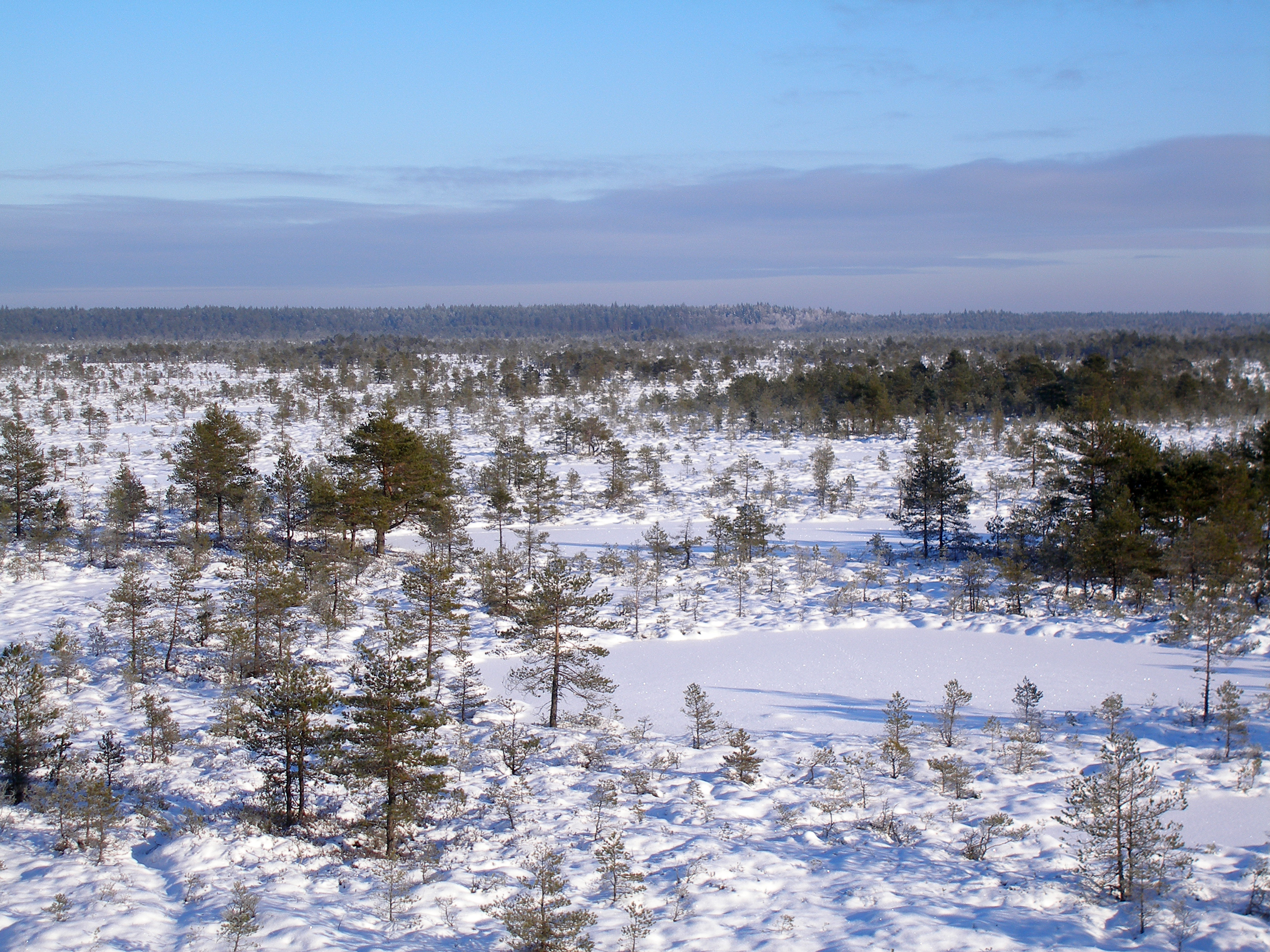
- Kõnnu Suursoo bog in winter

- Location: Estonia
- Nearest city: Tallinn
- Coordinates: 59°23′N 25°42′E
- Area: 130.9 km^{2} (32,346 acres)
- Established: 1991

Põhja-Kõrvemaa Nature Reserve (Estonian: Põhja-Kõrvemaa looduskaitseala) is a protected area in Harju County, Northern Estonia, some 50 km east of Tallinn. With an area of 130.9 km^{2}, it is the third largest nature reserve in Estonia. Dominated by forests and bogs, it aims to protect rare and endangered species, their habitats, and valuable natural landscapes.

Põhja-Kõrvemaa (meaning North Kõrvemaa) occupies the northern part of Kõrvemaa, which itself forms the northern part of Transitional Estonia, a large forested and sparsely populated area spanning in northeast–southwest direction through Estonia, from Lahemaa through Soomaa to Latvia.

== History ==
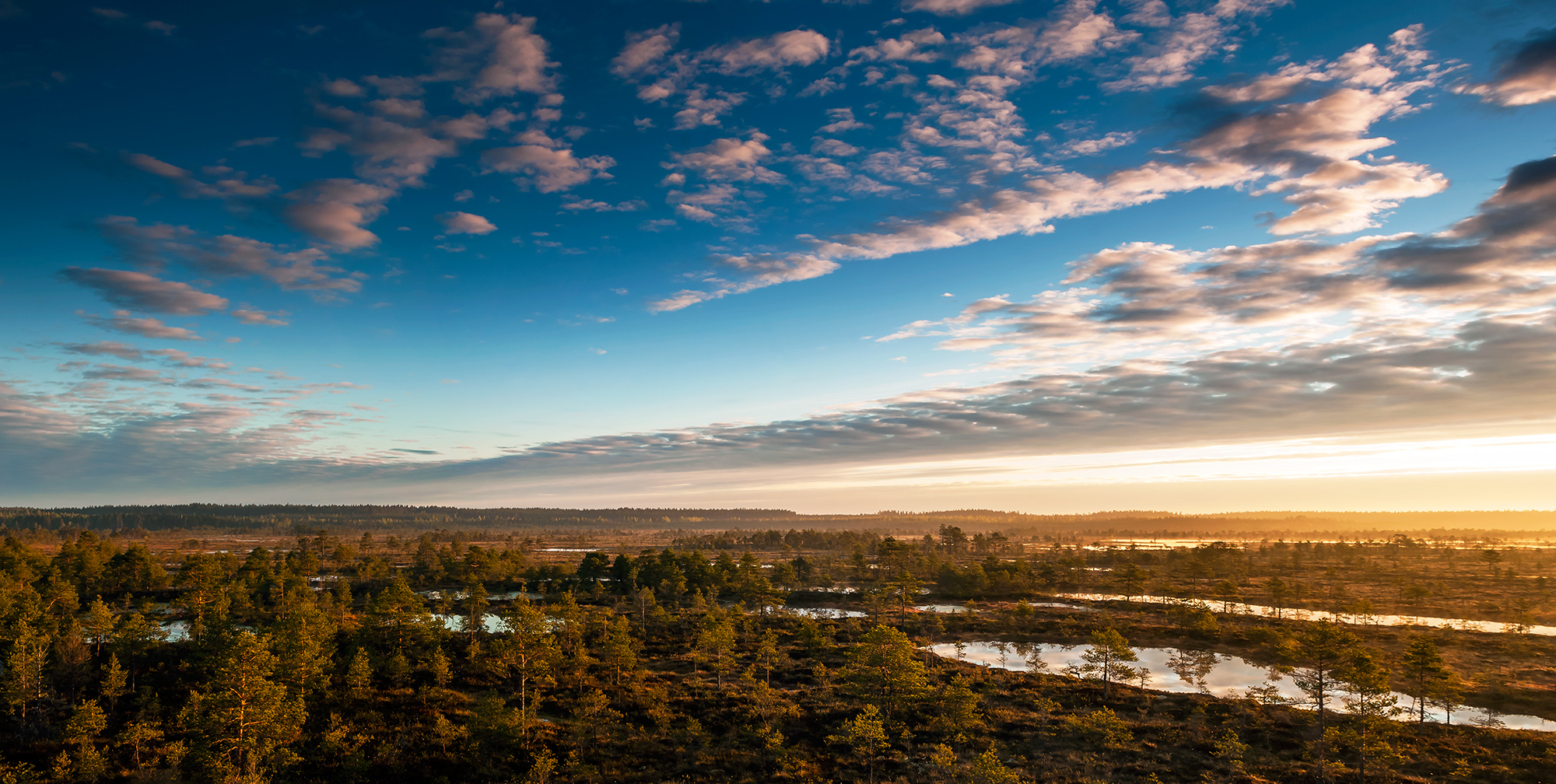
Morning in Põhja-Kõrvemaa Nature Reserve

Põhja-Kõrvemaa Nature Reserve was established towards the end of 1991, a few months after Estonia regained its independence. Throughout the Soviet Era a large part of the nature reserve's current territory was used by Soviet Army for military training and as such was closed to the public. The proving grounds were established in 1947 and in 1953 expanded to 33,304 ha (333 km^{2}), making it the biggest Soviet military polygon in Estonia. Still, the Soviet Army damaged only about 10% of the proving grounds' territory, leaving the rest intact. Due to unsuitability for agriculture (poor and/or badly drained soils) the whole region has always been very sparsely populated – in the beginning of the 1950s the population density was around 1 people per km^{2} – but still a few hundred people were displaced together with the creation of proving ground.

Põhja-Kõrvemaa nature reserve was formed in the western part of the former Aegviidu polygon, which had been hidden behind the official name of Pavlov Forest District. In the 1990s, Estonian Defence Forces were interested to begin reusing some areas of the former polygon now situated on the nature reserve's territory. However, due to strong opposition by local people and conservationists, the idea was given up. In 2001, Estonian Defence Forces central proving ground was established in the eastern part of the former Soviet military polygon. The Valgejõgi River is the natural divide between the current proving ground and the nature reserve.

From 1997 to 2007 the nature reserves official status was landscape protection area. In 2007 it was expanded from 12,890 to 13,086 hectares and official status changed back to nature reserve. Since 2004 it is part of the European Union Natura 2000 network.

== Nature ==
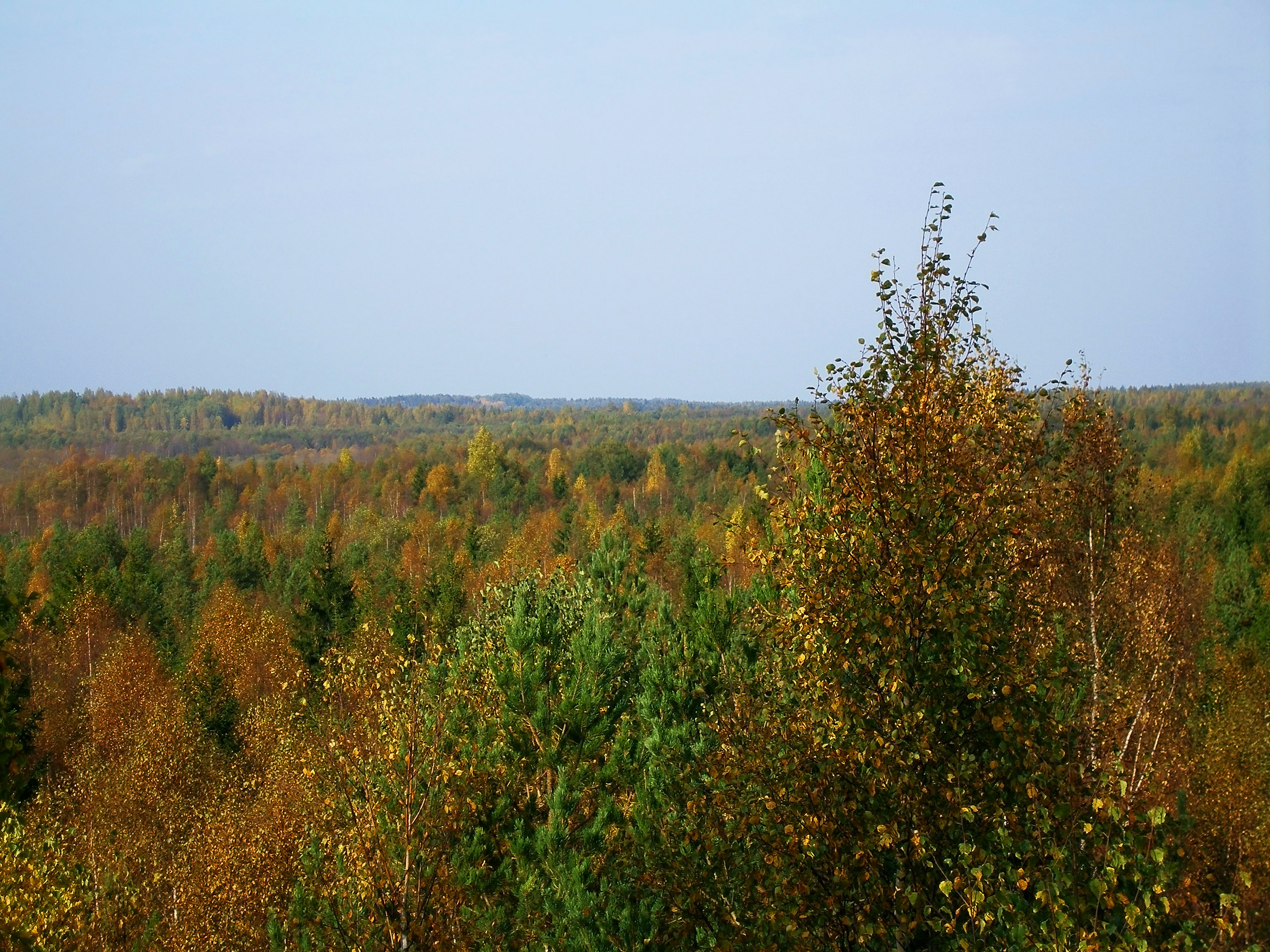
Forests around Soodla River.

The landscape in Põhja-Kõrvemaa took shape in the end of the last Ice Age, when the glacier retreated about 12,000 years ago and is as such a typical glacial landscape. It is characterized by ice marginal formations and glaciolacustrine plains, the latter of which are now mostly covered by extensive bogs and, to a much lesser extent, fens. Forests cover about 40% of the nature reserve's territory and man-made open areas only 10%.

The region is richest in Estonia in ice marginal formations. The most remarkable relief forms of the region are eskers, which form steep-sided ridges of very complex relief that extend to a number of kilometers and are up to 25 m high. Along with eskers there are several kame fields — areas covered with hillocks consisting of sand and gravel. Jussi kame field is the best known in Põhja-Kõrvemaa.

There are more than 30 lakes in Põhja-Kõrvemaa. Most of the lakes are small, situated either in bogs (Kivijärv, Koitjärv, Venejärv and others) or between kames. Jussi lakes is a group of 6 lakes (spanning from 2 to 20 hectares in area) situated in the eastern part of the Jussi kame field.

In addition to the lakes, the three biggest bogs (Koitjärve, Kõnnu Suursoo and Võhma bogs), which cover about half of the territory, have developed extensive ridges of small bog ponds, which can be counted in hundreds.

=== Flora and fauna ===
A number of rare or endangered species can be found in Põhja-Kõrvemaa, which is one of the main reasons behind the area's status as a nature reserve. It is home to large predators such as gray wolf, Eurasian lynx and brown bear. Small populations of European mink endured until the beginning of the 1990s, but are now disappeared, as in most of Estonia. Protected bird species include black stork, golden eagle, capercaillie and common crane. Nineteen species of orchids can be found in Põhja-Kõrvemaa (for example, Goodyera repens and Platanthera bifolia), among other rare plants growing in the area are Pulsatilla patens, Sparganium angustifolium, Isoetes echinospora and Oxytropis sordida (the only place in Estonia where the plant is found).

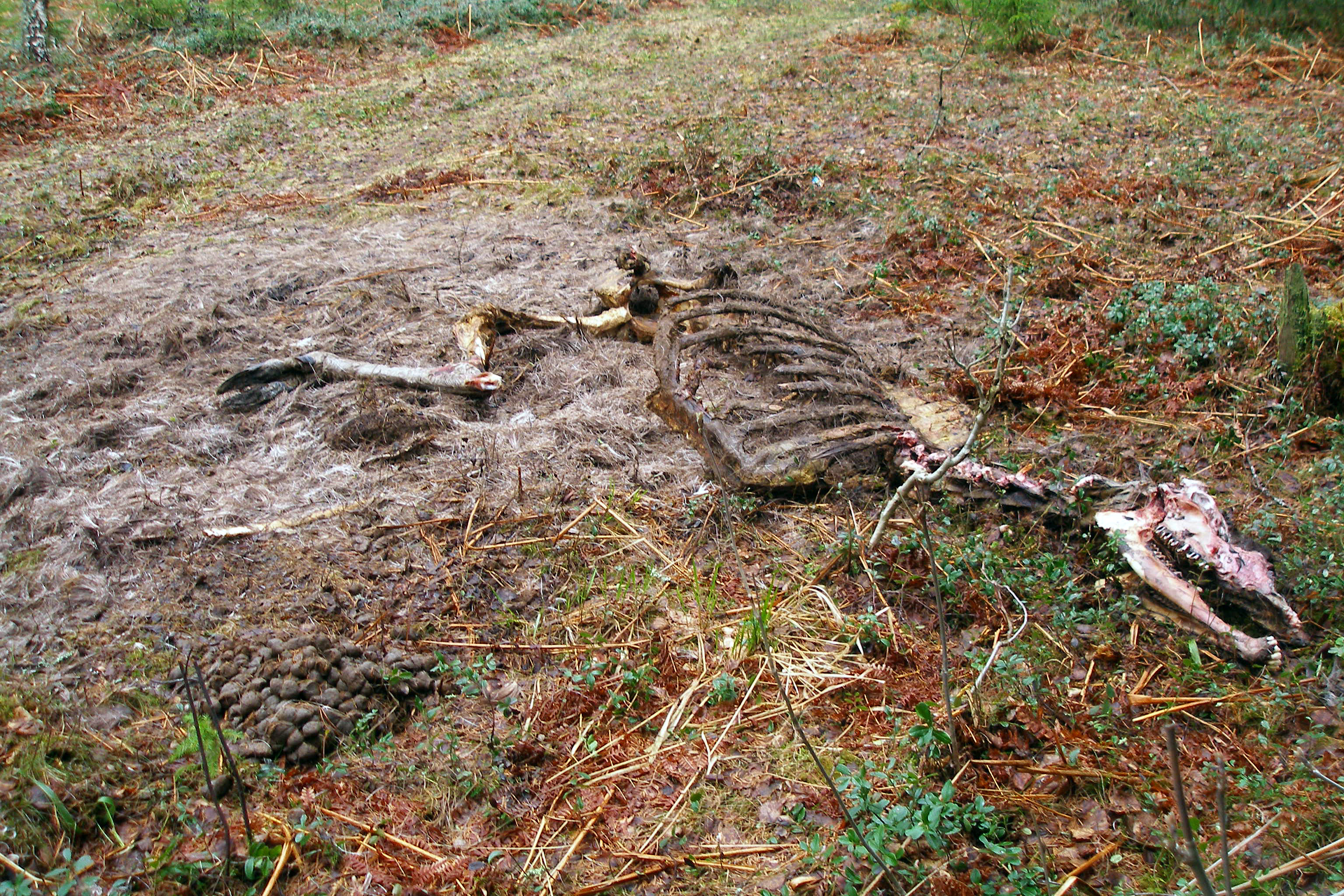
Carcasse of a moose

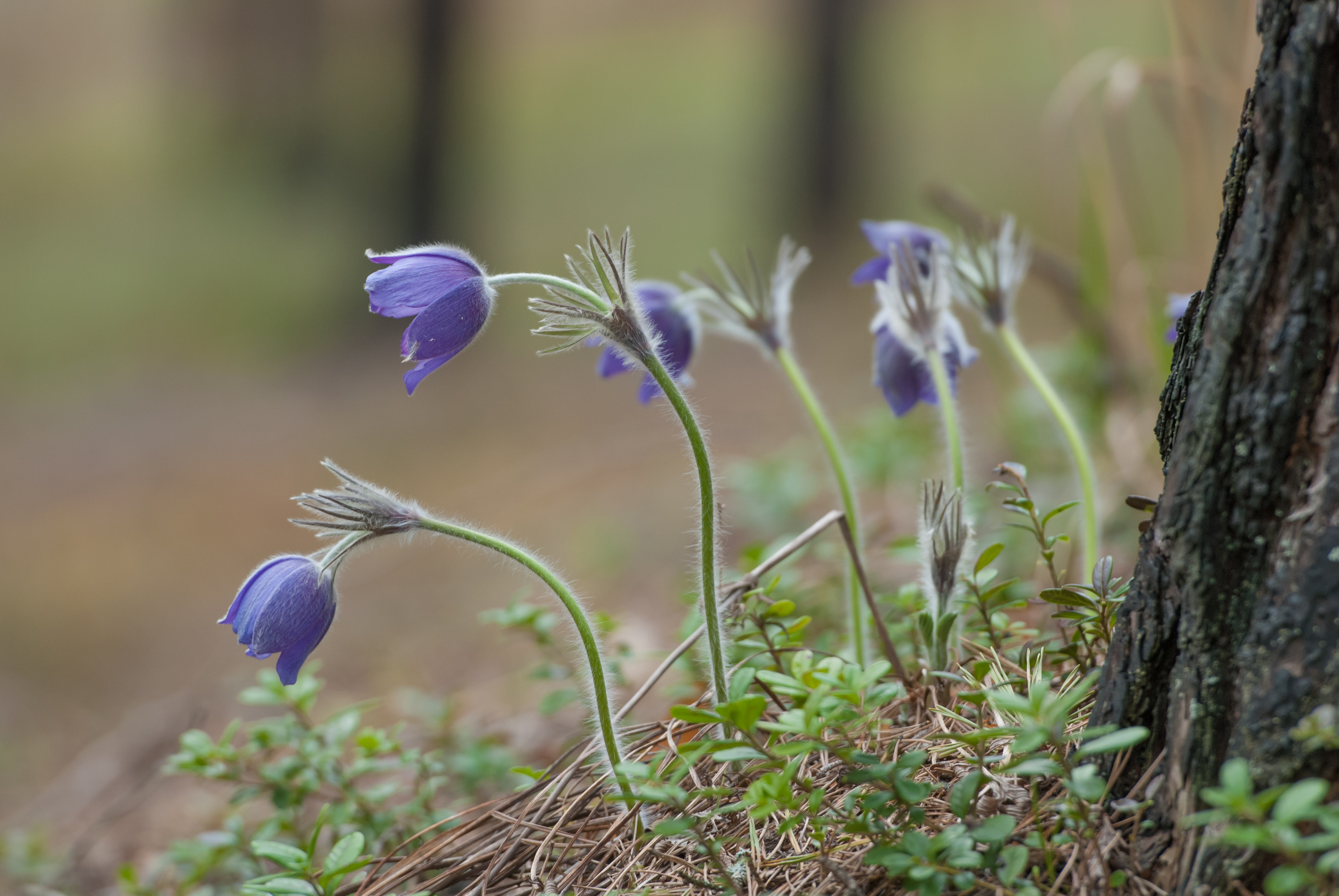
Pulsatilla patens in Kõrvemaa

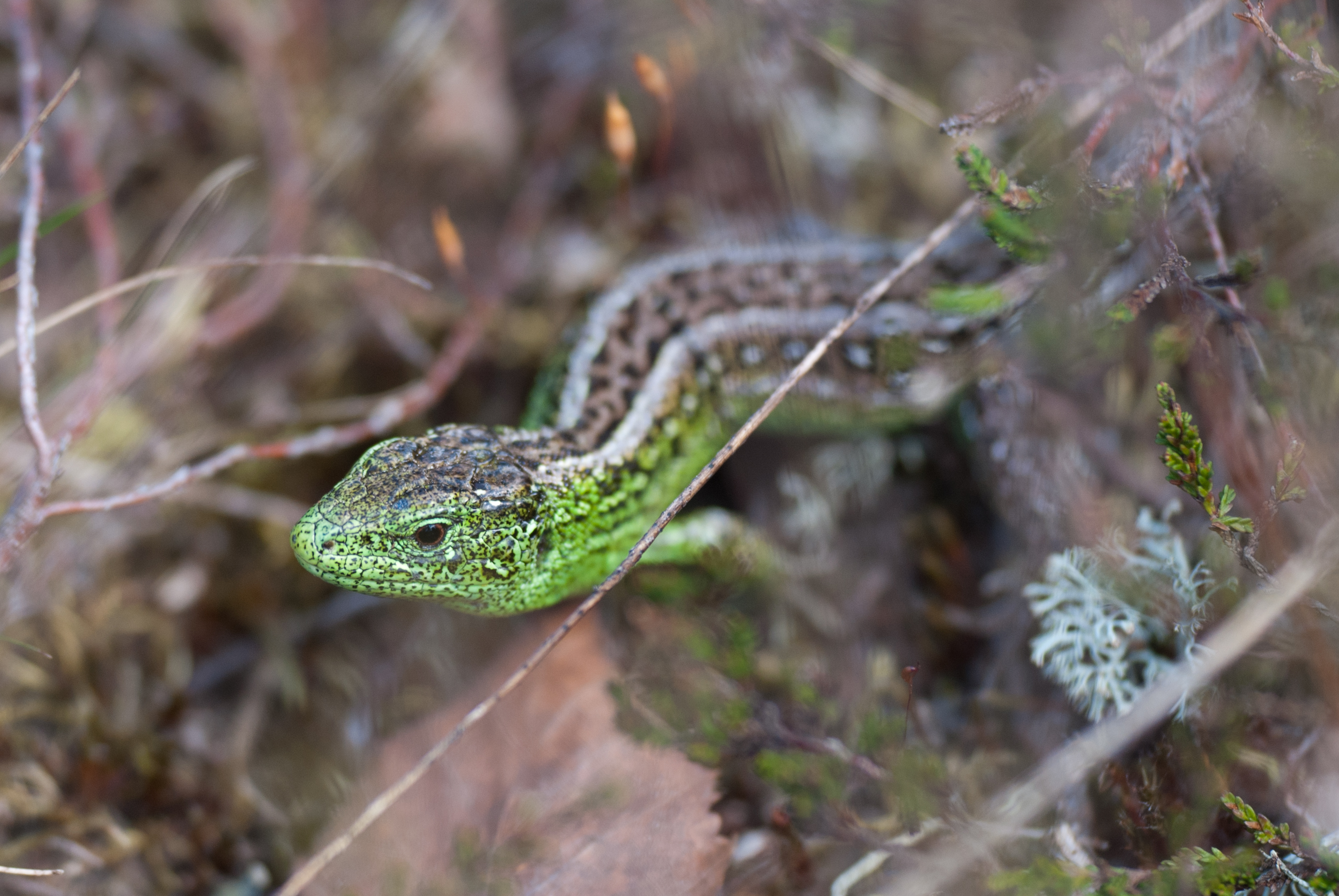
Sand lizard in Jussi heat

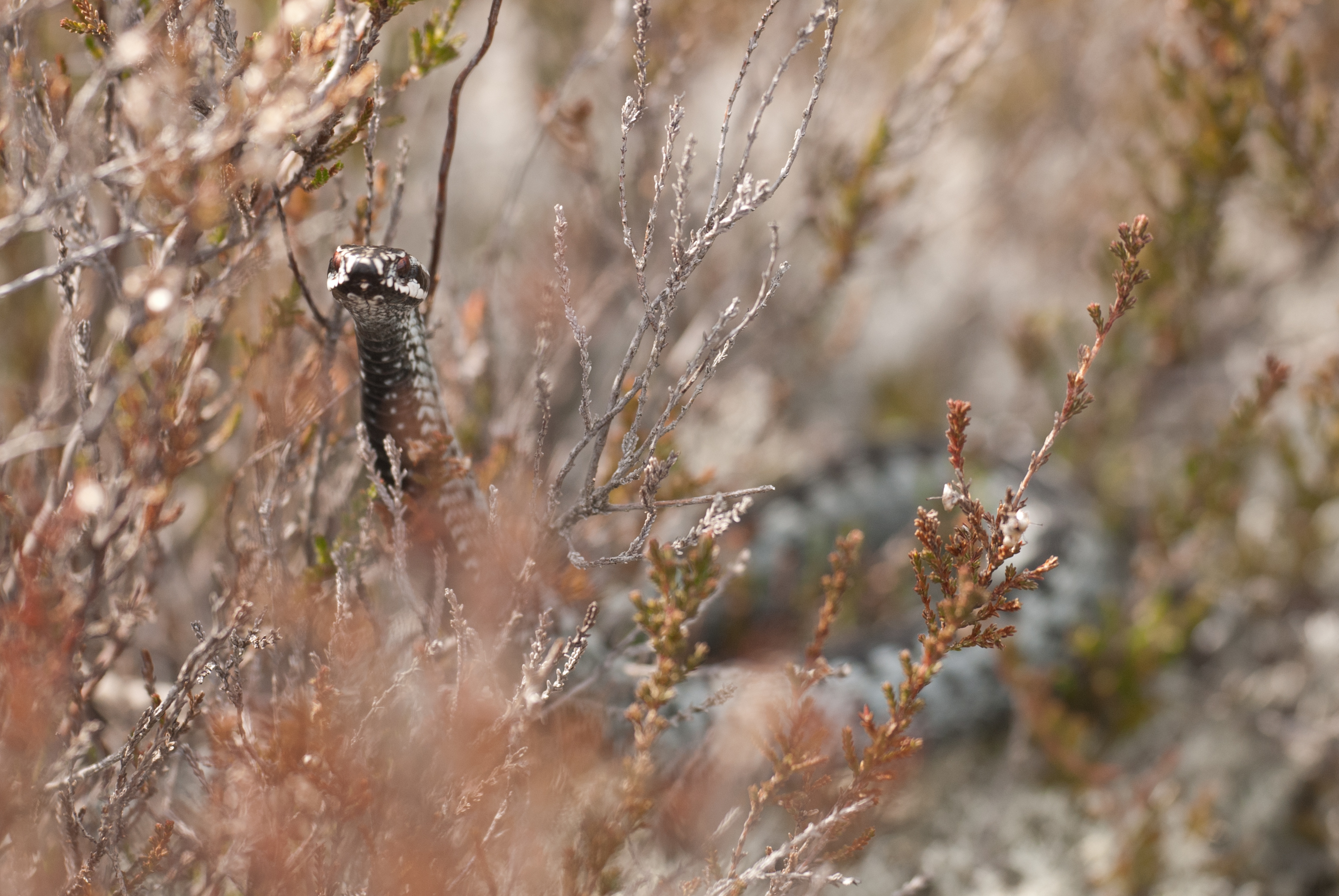
Vipera berus

== Recreation ==
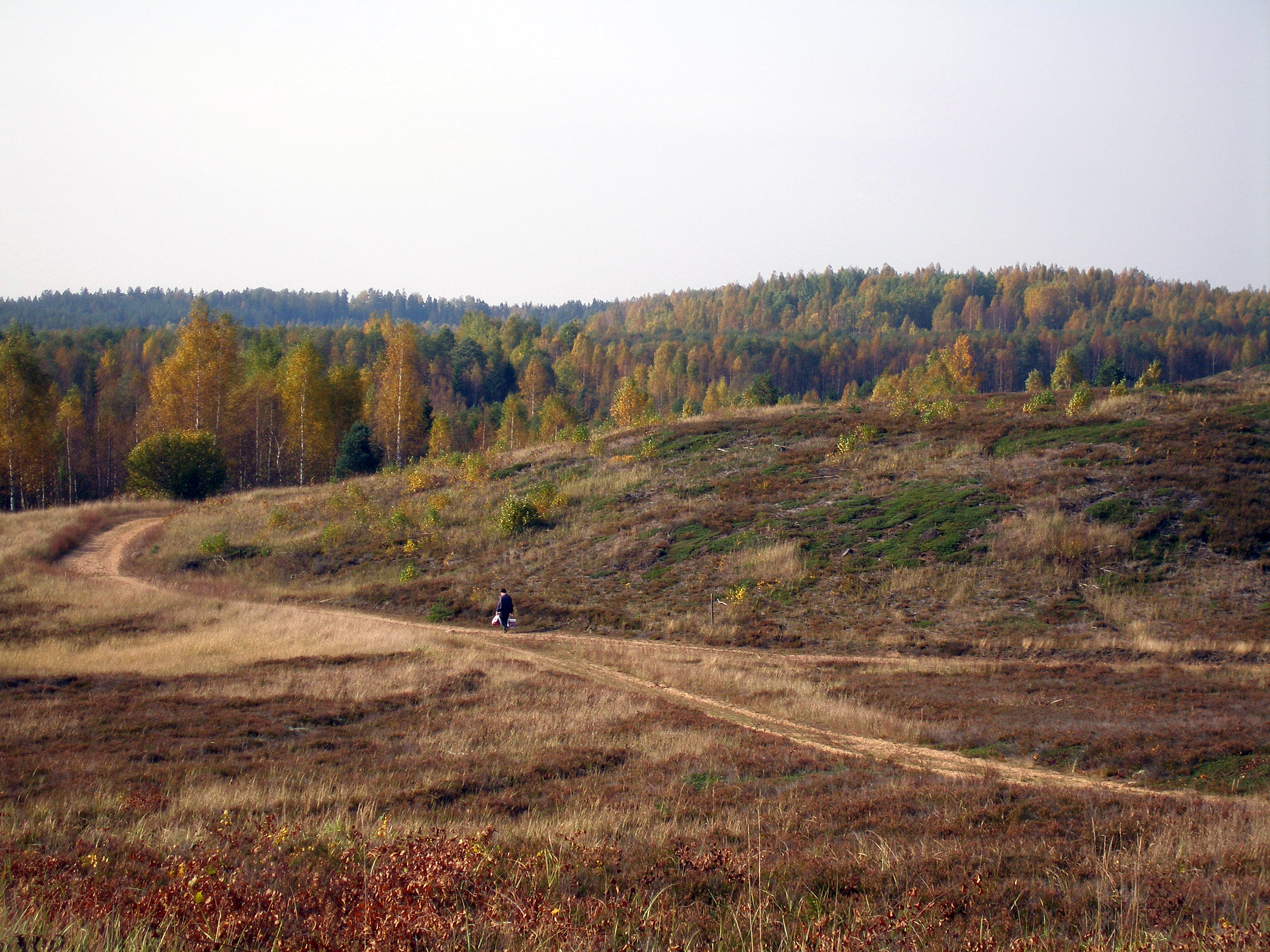
A berry or mushroom picker on Jussi heath, an area formerly used for aerial bombardment training.

Põhja-Kõrvemaa is one of the most visited protected areas in Estonia due to the closeness of Tallinn and general good accessibility - in the north the nature reserve is bordered by the Tallinn-Narva highway (E20) and in the west by Jägala-Aegviidu-Käravete secondary road. The nature reserve itself has also a considerable amount of gravel and dirt roads. Aegviidu, which is located less than 5 km southwest from the nature reserve and is the endpoint of Elron commuter railway line, can be reached in an hour from the center of Tallinn.

There are several hiking trails, the longest being the 36 km long Liiapeksi-Aegviidu trail, which crosses the nature reserve from north to south, and also continues to the north in Lahemaa National Park, which is separated from Põhja-Kõrvemaa by Tallinn-Narva highway. Shorter nature and hiking trails and half a dozen campsites are also available, all managed by the State forest management centre (RMK).

Despite the hiking facilities created in recent years, berry and mushroom picking are still the most popular activities among the visitors.

On summer weekends, up to 700 people visit Põhja-Kõrvemaa daily, most of whom drive from Tallinn.

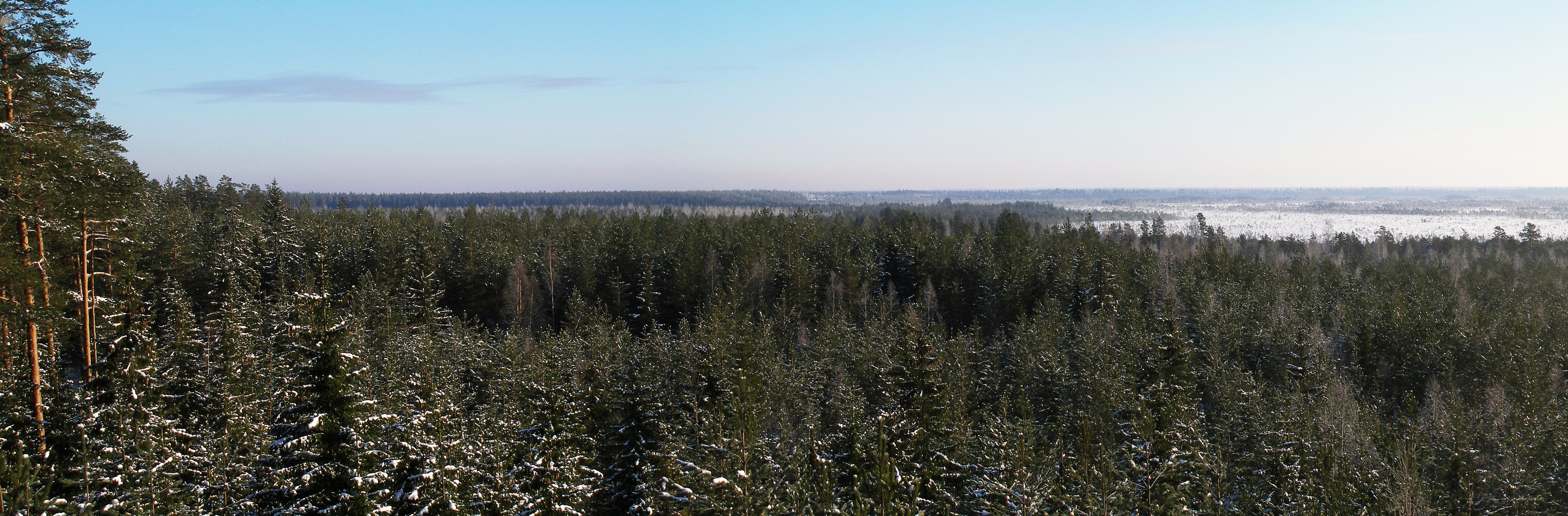
View to the east from Järvi Lakes.

== See also ==
- Nature tours in Põhja-Kõrvemaa
- Aviators Boulder in Põhja-Kõrvemaa (estonian)(site is for the memorial of the Estonian Air Force officers who are killed by NKVD officers in near-by site)
