= Kuusalu Parish =

Municipality of Estonia

Coordinates: 59°26′38″N 25°26′29″E

Kuusalu Parish Kuusalu vald
- Municipality of Estonia
- Flag Coat of arms

- Kuusalu Parish within Harju County.
- Country: Estonia
- County: Harju County
- Administrative centre: Kiiu

Government
  - Mayor: Terje Kraanvelt

Area
  - Total: 707.97 km^{2} (273.35 sq mi)

Population (2026)
  - Total: 6,463
  - Density: 9.129/km^{2} (23.64/sq mi)
- ISO 3166 code: EE-353
- Website: www.kuusalu.ee

Kuusalu Parish (Estonian: Kuusalu vald) is a rural municipality in northern Estonia, in terms of territory the largest in Harju County. It united with the former Loksa Parish in 2005. The municipality has a population of 6,463 (as of 1 January 2026) and covers an area of 707.97 km^{2} (273.35 sq mi). The population density is 9.1/km^{2} (23.6/sq mi).

A significant share of the municipality's territory (between 40% and 60%) is covered by protected areas, as large parts of the Lahemaa National Park and Põhja-Kõrvemaa Nature Reserve are situated there. The eastern part of the municipality is home to the largest military training area in Estonia, the central training area of Estonian Defence Forces.

The current mayor (Estonian: vallavanem) is Terje Kraanvelt.

== Demographics ==
As of 1 January 2026, the parish had 6,463 residents, of which 3,310 (51.2%) were women and 3,153 (48.8%) were men.

=== Settlements ===
The administrative centre of the municipality is Kiiu. There is a total of 3 small boroughs — Kuusalu (1225 inhabitants), Kiiu (893 inhabitants) and Kolga (501 inhabitants) — and 64 villages in Kuusalu Parish.

=== Religion ===
The religious landscape of the parish is predominantly secular, with 83.6% of the population identifying as religiously unaffiliated. Among those older than fifteen years residents who do associate themselves with a faith, 10.3% identify as Lutheran, 1.3% as Baptist and 1.2% as Orthodox, while other Christian denominations make up 0.5% of the population. 2.9% of the population follows other religions or did not specify their religious affiliation.

== Gallery ==
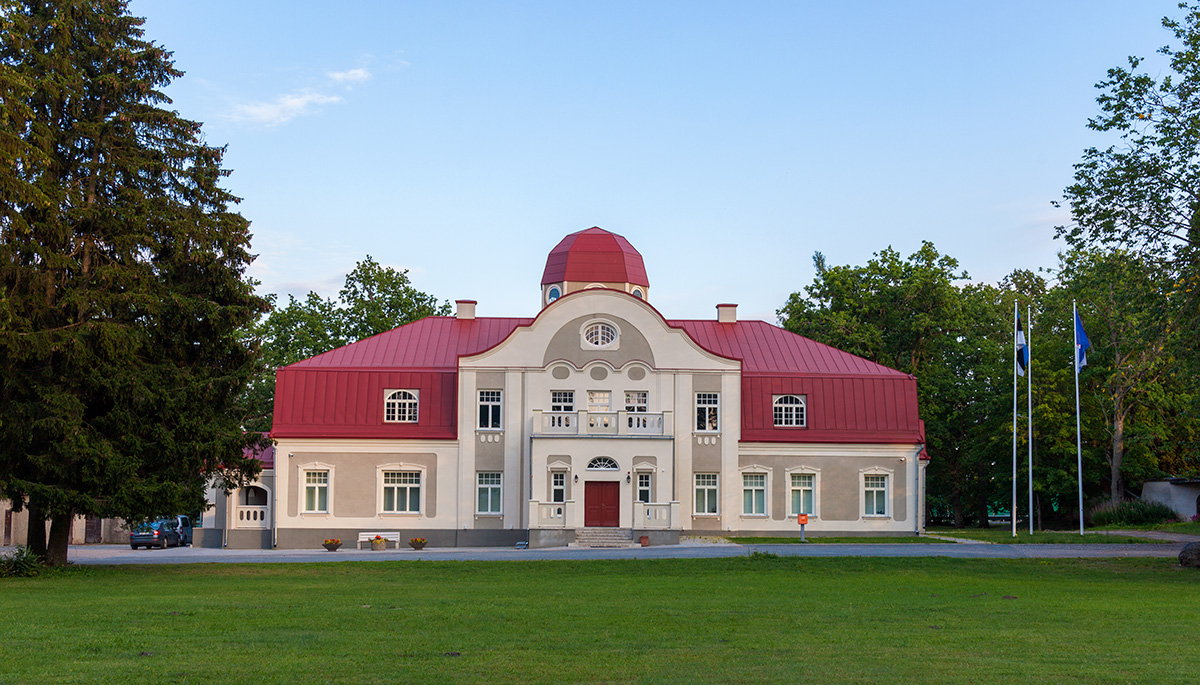
Kiiu manor house

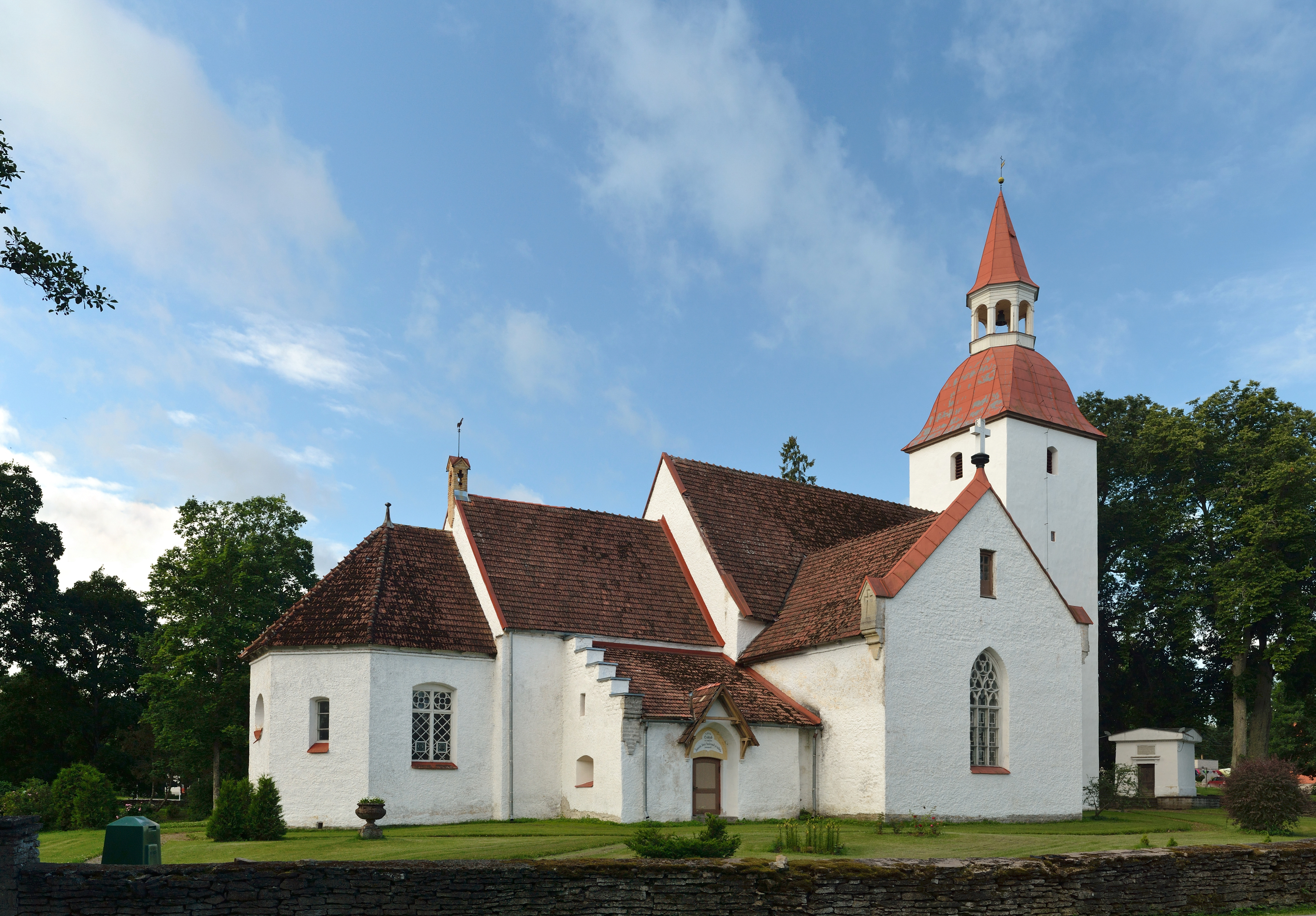
Kuusalu church

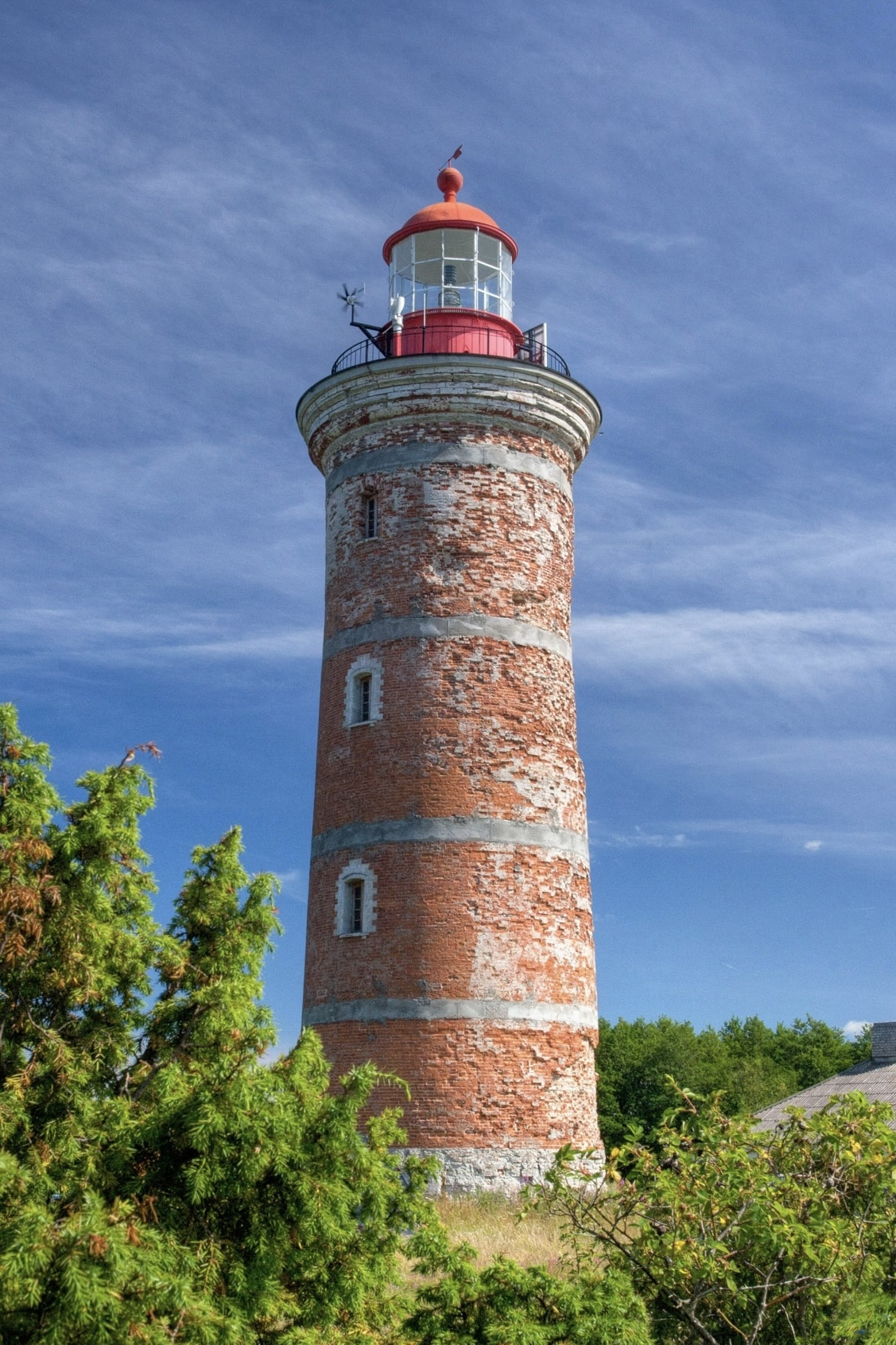
Mohni lighthouse

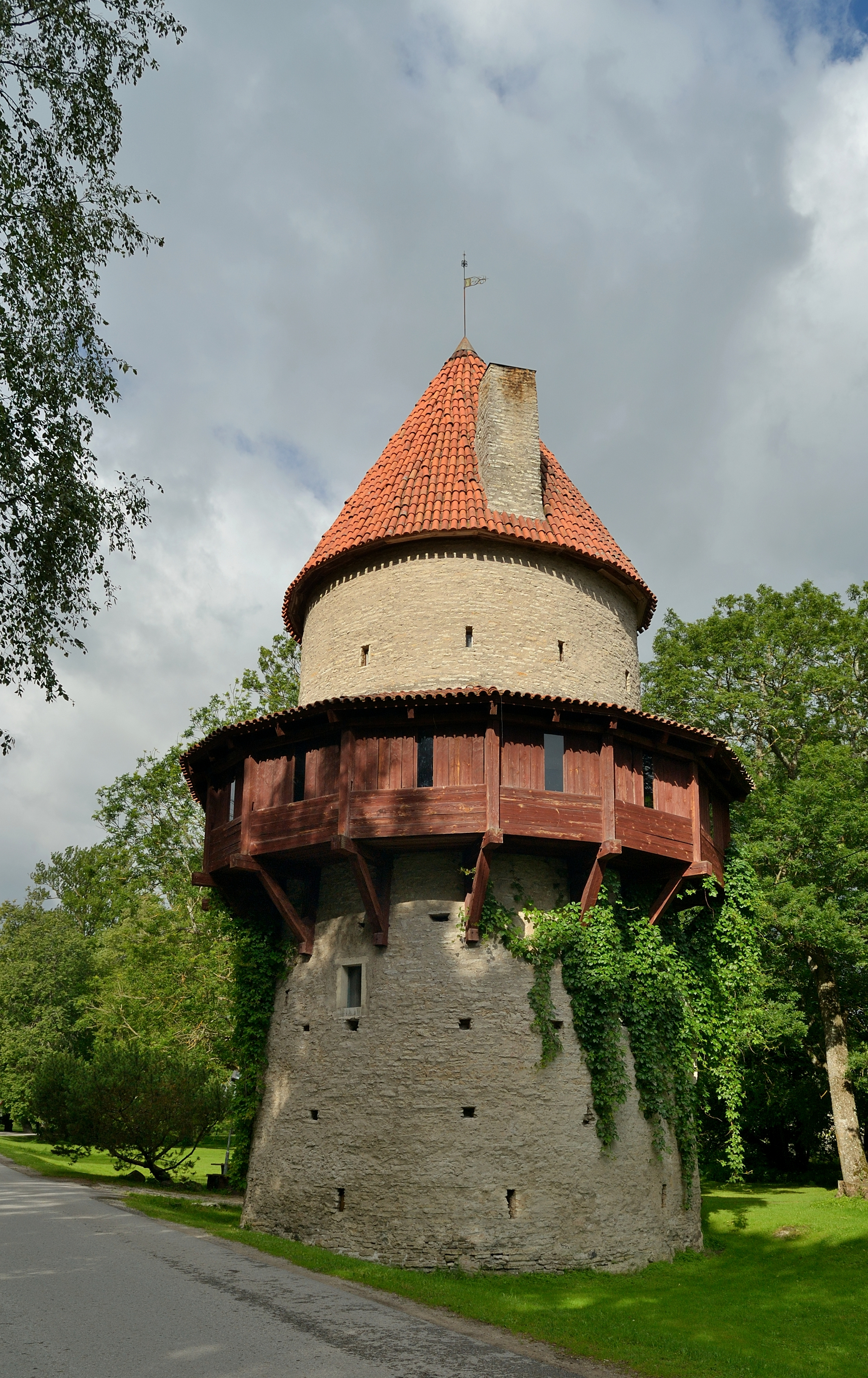
Kiiu tower

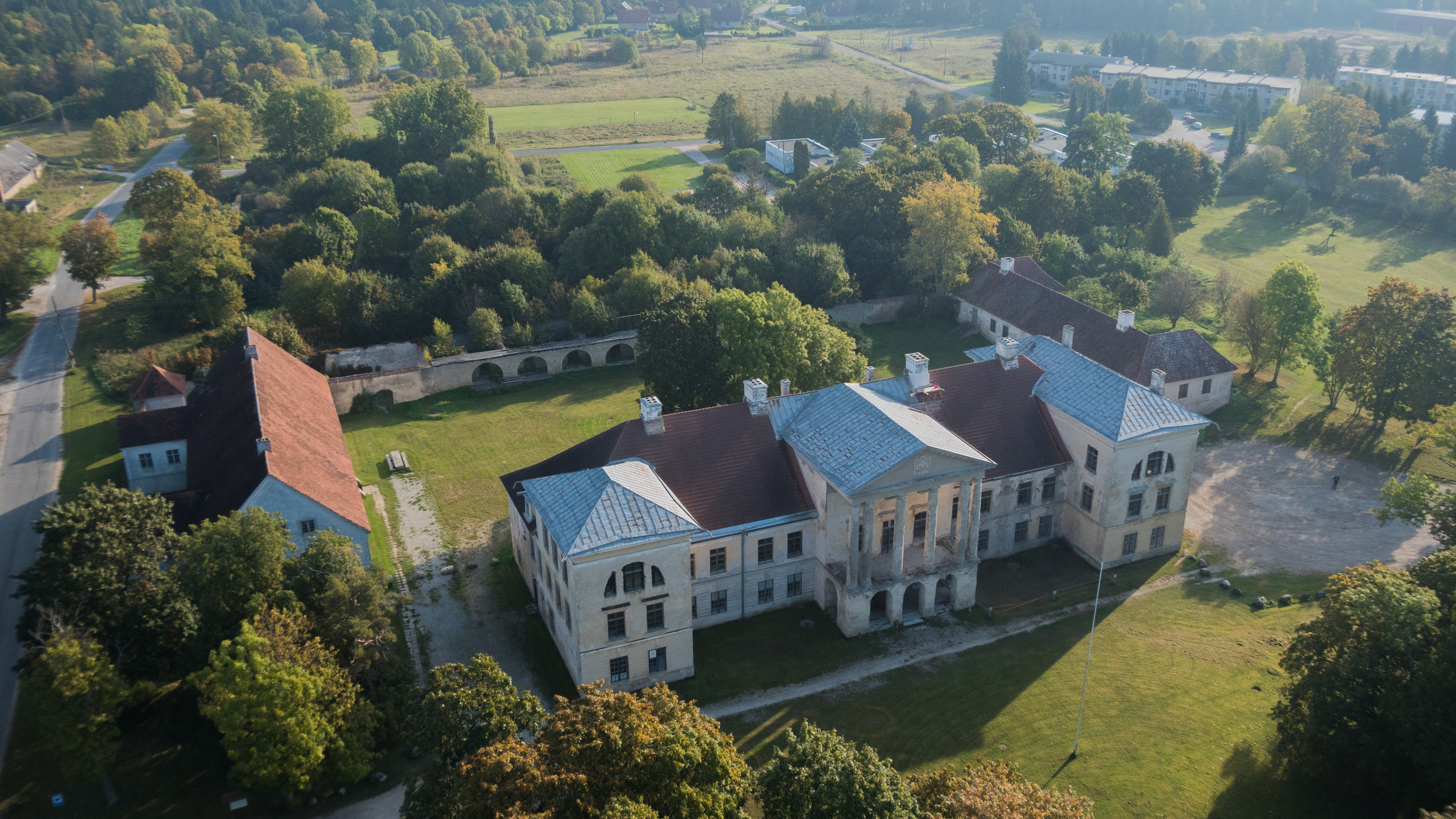
Kolga manor house

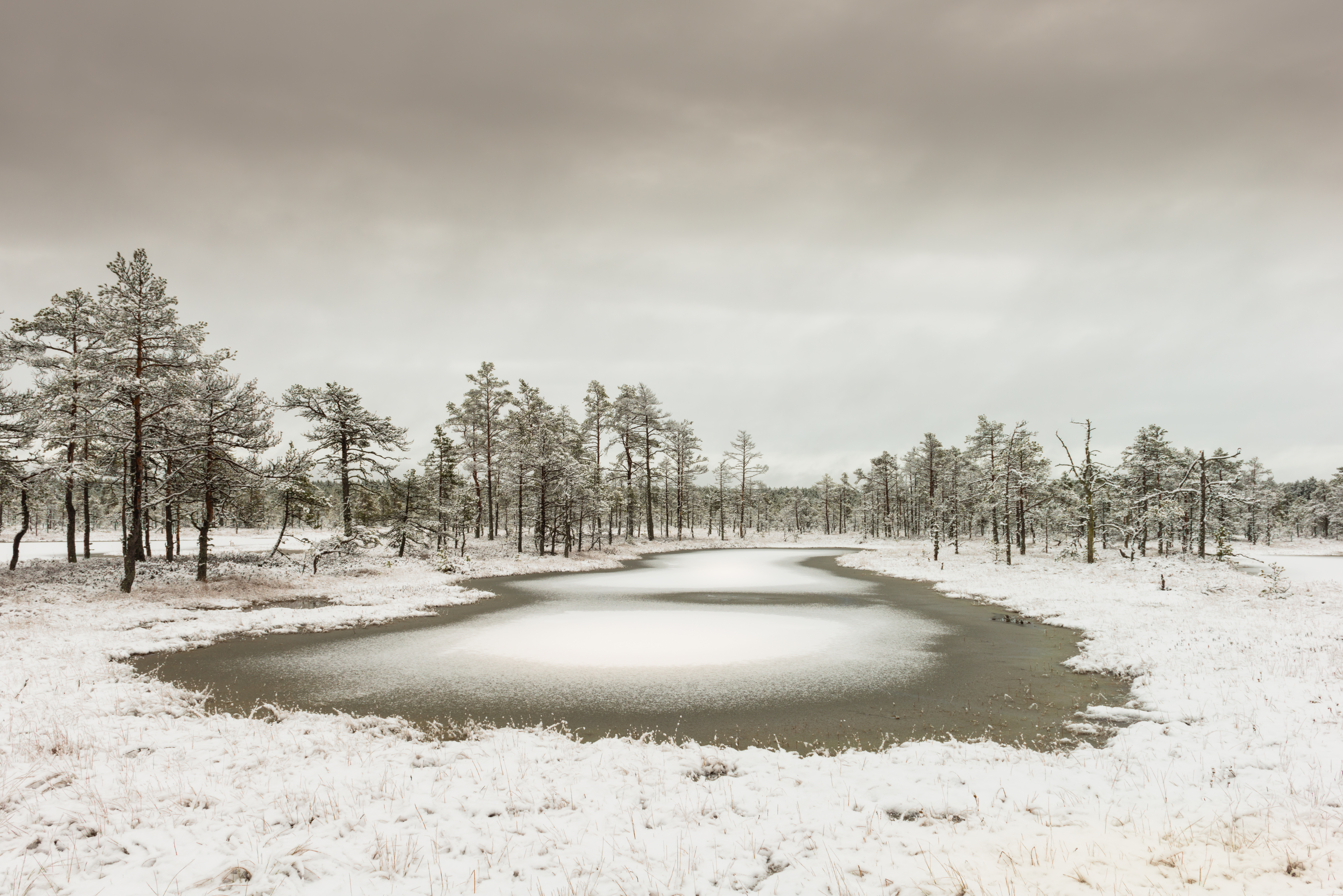
Viru Bog in winter

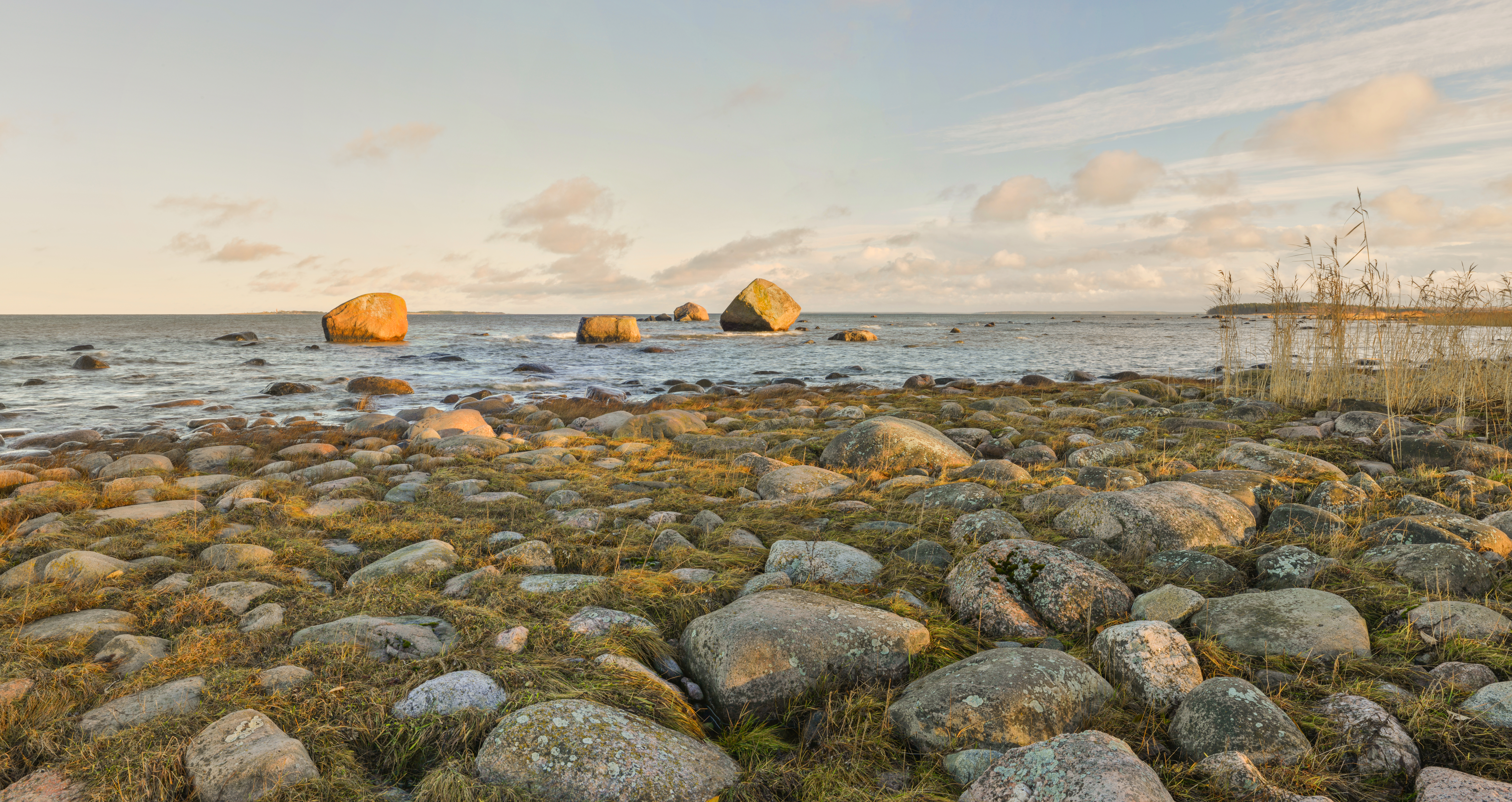
Coast at Pärispea Peninsula

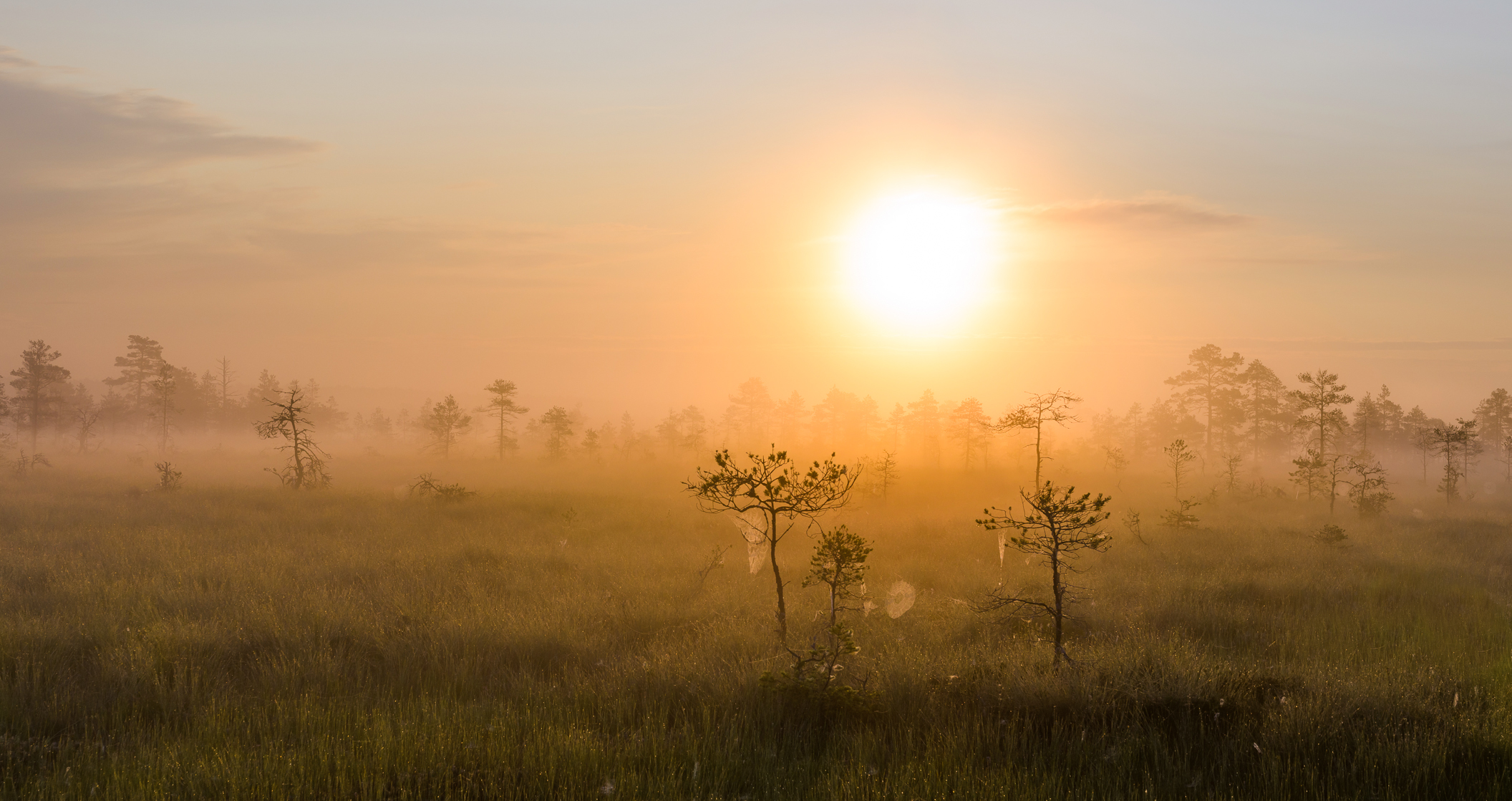
Suru Suursoo in early morning

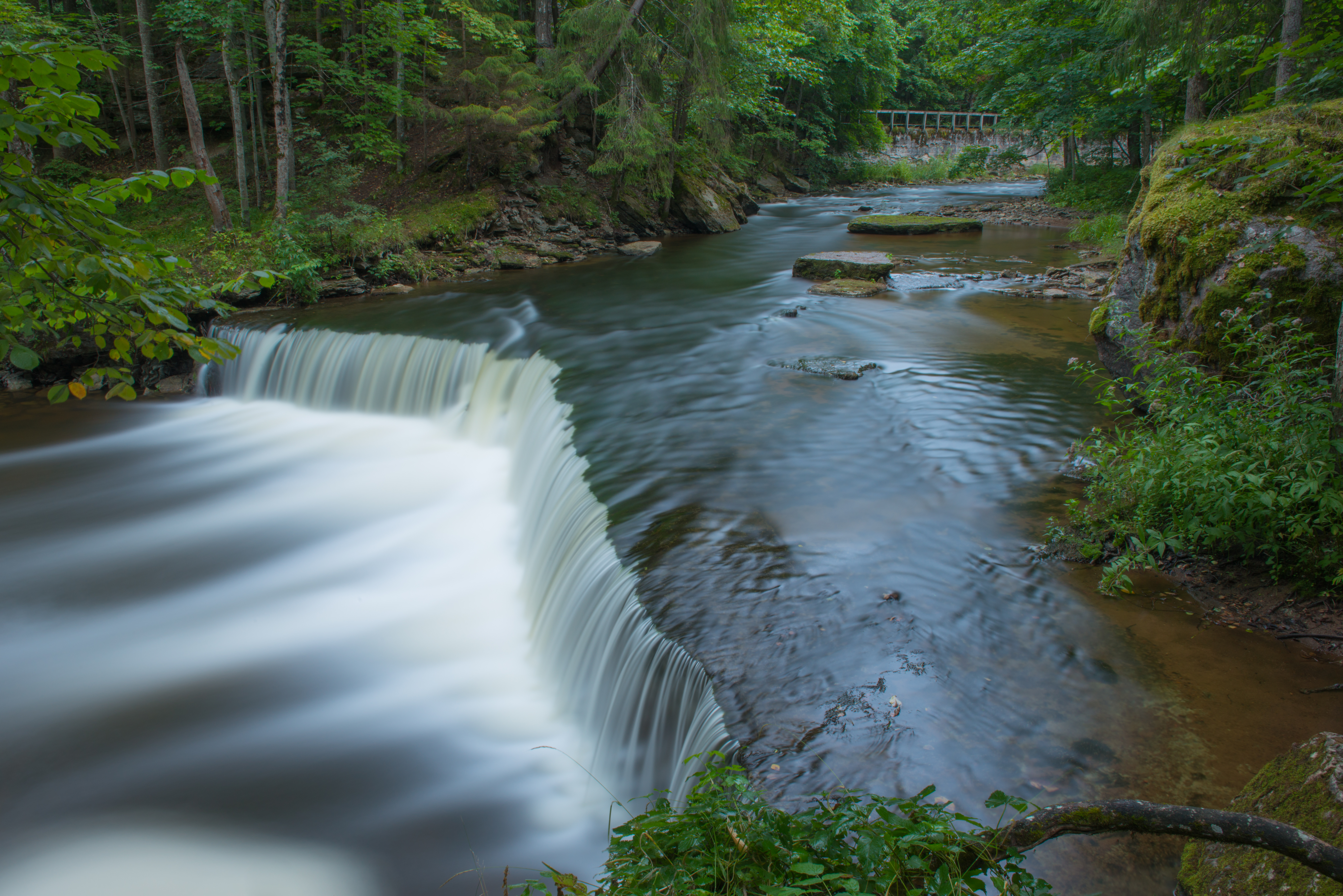
Nõmmeveski Falls

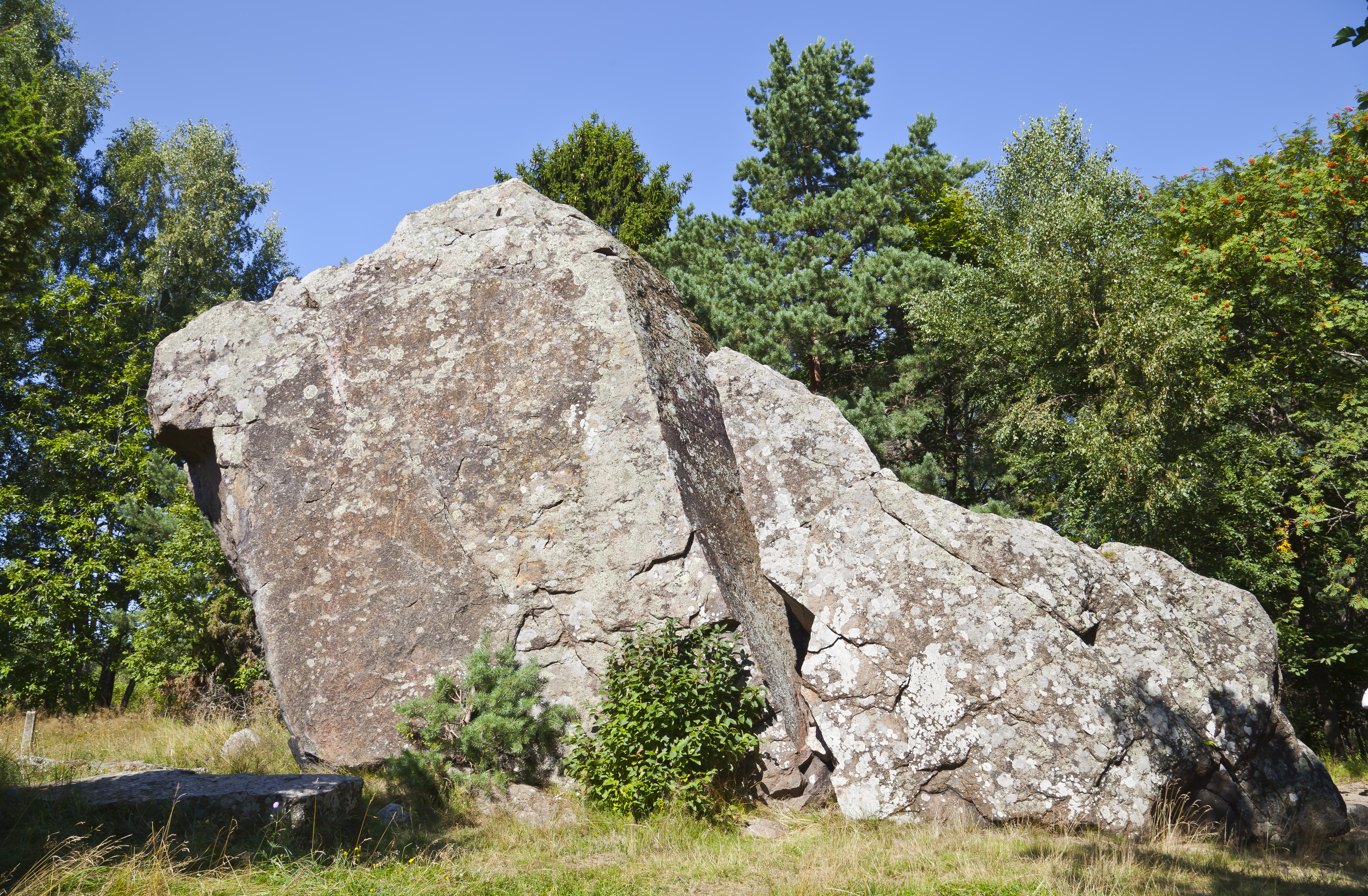
Jaani-Tooma boulder

== Notable people ==
- Ivan Staël von Holstein (1798 in Kodasoo – 1868), a Baltic German officer of the Imperial Russian Army
- Hans William von Fersen (1858 in Kolga – 1937) a Baltic German admiral in the navy of the former Russian Empire
- Walter von Wistinghausen (1879 in Tsitre – 1956), a Baltic German actor, journalist, translator and writer.
- Aleksander Aberg (1881 in Kolga – 1920), Greco-Roman and free-style wrestling world champion
- Gustav Vilbaste (1885 in Haavakannu – 1967), botanist, publicist and conservationist; hon. member of Estonian Naturalists' Society
- Kaarel Heinver (1886 in Kemba – 1961), politician, the first mayor of the former Kõnnu Municipality
- Aleksander Warma (1890 in Viinistu – 1970), navy officer, diplomat, and painter.
- Hilda Dresen (1896 in Kolga – 1981), a radio-telegraphist and Esperantist translator.
- Anton Koolmann (1899 in Kasispea – 1953), a wrestler and coach who took part at the 1924 Summer Olympics
- Valter Soosõrv (1903 in Vahastu – 1969), actor, director and theatre historian; head of Estonian Theatre and Music Museum, 1948-1951
- Erika Nõva (1905 in Muuksi – 1987), architect, remembered mainly for her farmhouse designs.
- Veljo Tormis (1930 in Kuusalu – 2017), a distinguished choral composer
- Jaan Manitski (born 1942 in Viinistu), businessman, politician and art collector and Minister of Foreign Affairs in 1992.
- Värner Lootsmann (born 1945 in Kasispea), politician, the county governor of Harju County.

== See also ==
- Kuusalu JK Rada
