= Võduvere =

Võduvere may refer to several places in Estonia:

- Võduvere, Jõgeva County, village in Jõgeva Parish, Jõgeva County
- Võduvere, Lääne-Viru County, village in Kadrina Parish, Lääne-Viru County
