= Viitna Landscape Conservation Area =

Nature park in Estonia

- Location within Estonia
- Location: Estonia
- Coordinates: 59°26′N 26°00′E
- Area: 315 hectares (780 acres)
- Established: 2014

Viitna Landscape Conservation Area is a nature park situated in Lääne-Viru County, Estonia.

Its area is 315 hectares (780 acres).

The protected area was designated in 2014 to protect Viitna eskers, its biodiversity and its surrounding areas.
