= Saukse =

Village in Estonia

Coordinates: 59°20′04″N 26°14′16″E

- Village
- Interactive map of Saukse
- Country: Estonia
- County: Lääne-Viru County
- Parish: Kadrina Parish
- Time zone: UTC+2 (EET)
  - Summer (DST): UTC+3 (EEST)

Saukse is a village in Kadrina Parish, Lääne-Viru County, in northeastern Estonia.
