= Mõndavere =

Village in Estonia

Coordinates: 59°24′N 25°55′E

- Village
- Interactive map of Mõndavere
- Country: Estonia
- County: Lääne-Viru County
- Parish: Kadrina Parish
- Time zone: UTC+2 (EET)
  - Summer (DST): UTC+3 (EEST)

Mõndavere is a village in Kadrina Parish, Lääne-Viru County, in northeastern Estonia.
