= Orutaguse =

Village in Estonia

Coordinates: 59°20′04″N 26°12′26″E

- Village
- Interactive map of Orutaguse
- Country: Estonia
- County: Lääne-Viru County
- Parish: Kadrina Parish

Population (2011)
  - Total: 31
- Time zone: UTC+2 (EET)
  - Summer (DST): UTC+3 (EEST)

Orutaguse is a village in Kadrina Parish, Lääne-Viru County, in northeastern Estonia.
