= Ohepalu =

Village in Estonia

Coordinates: 59°21′N 25°57′E

- Village
- Interactive map of Ohepalu
- Country: Estonia
- County: Lääne-Viru County
- Parish: Kadrina Parish
- Time zone: UTC+2 (EET)
  - Summer (DST): UTC+3 (EEST)

Ohepalu is a village in Kadrina Parish, Lääne-Viru County, in northeastern Estonia.

== Gallery ==
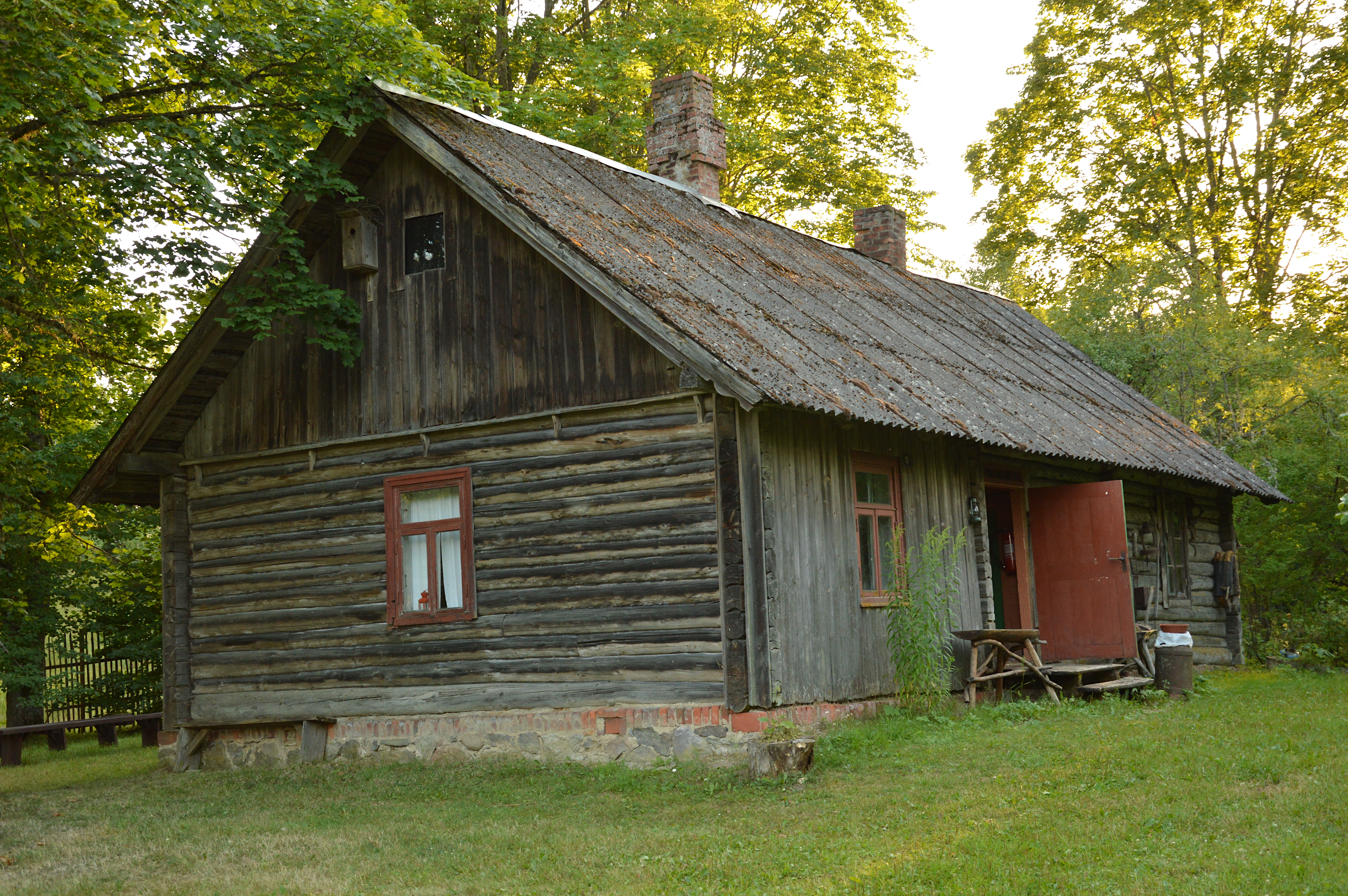
Linnumäe Nature Farm

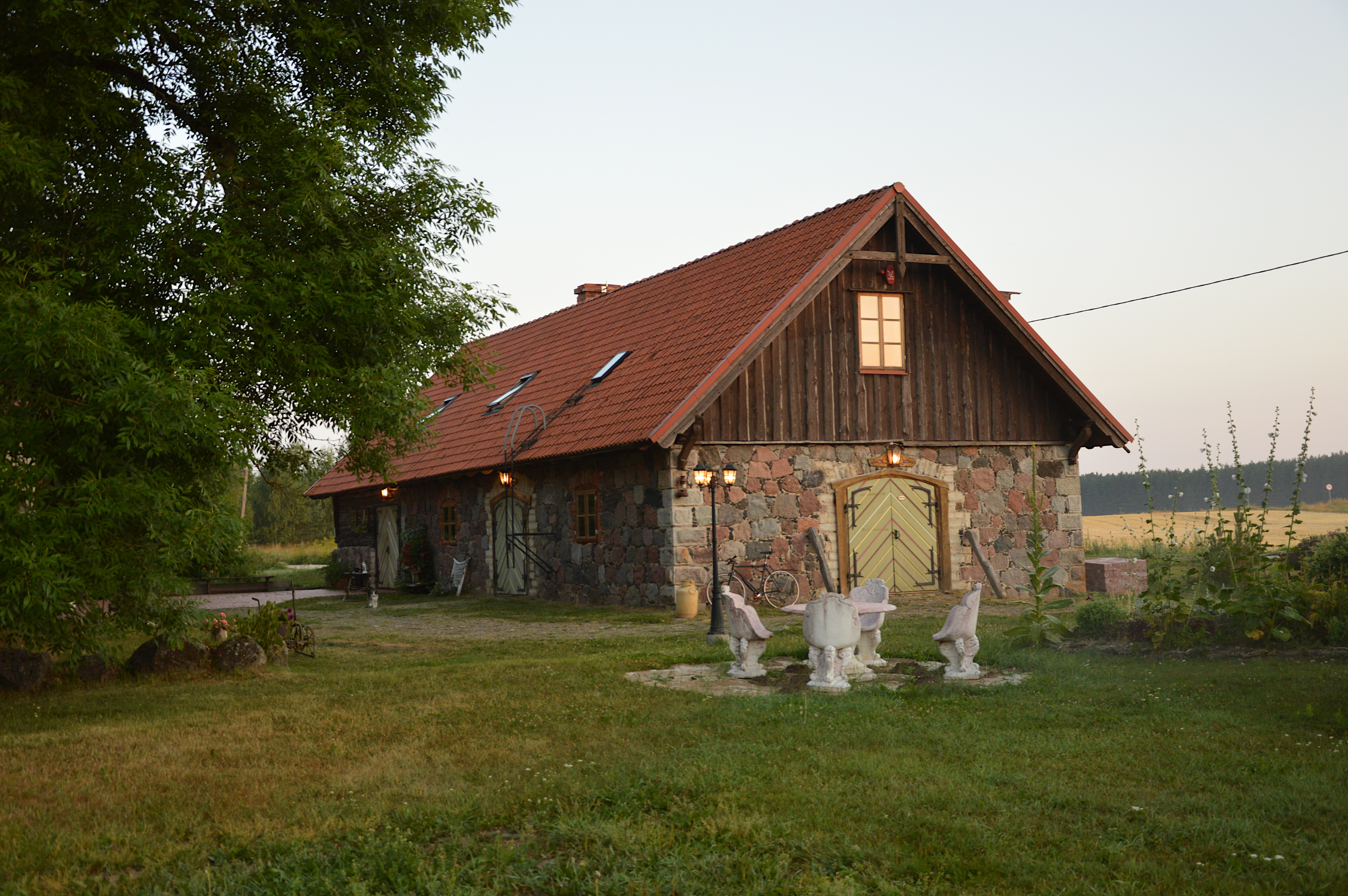
Õnnela Guest House

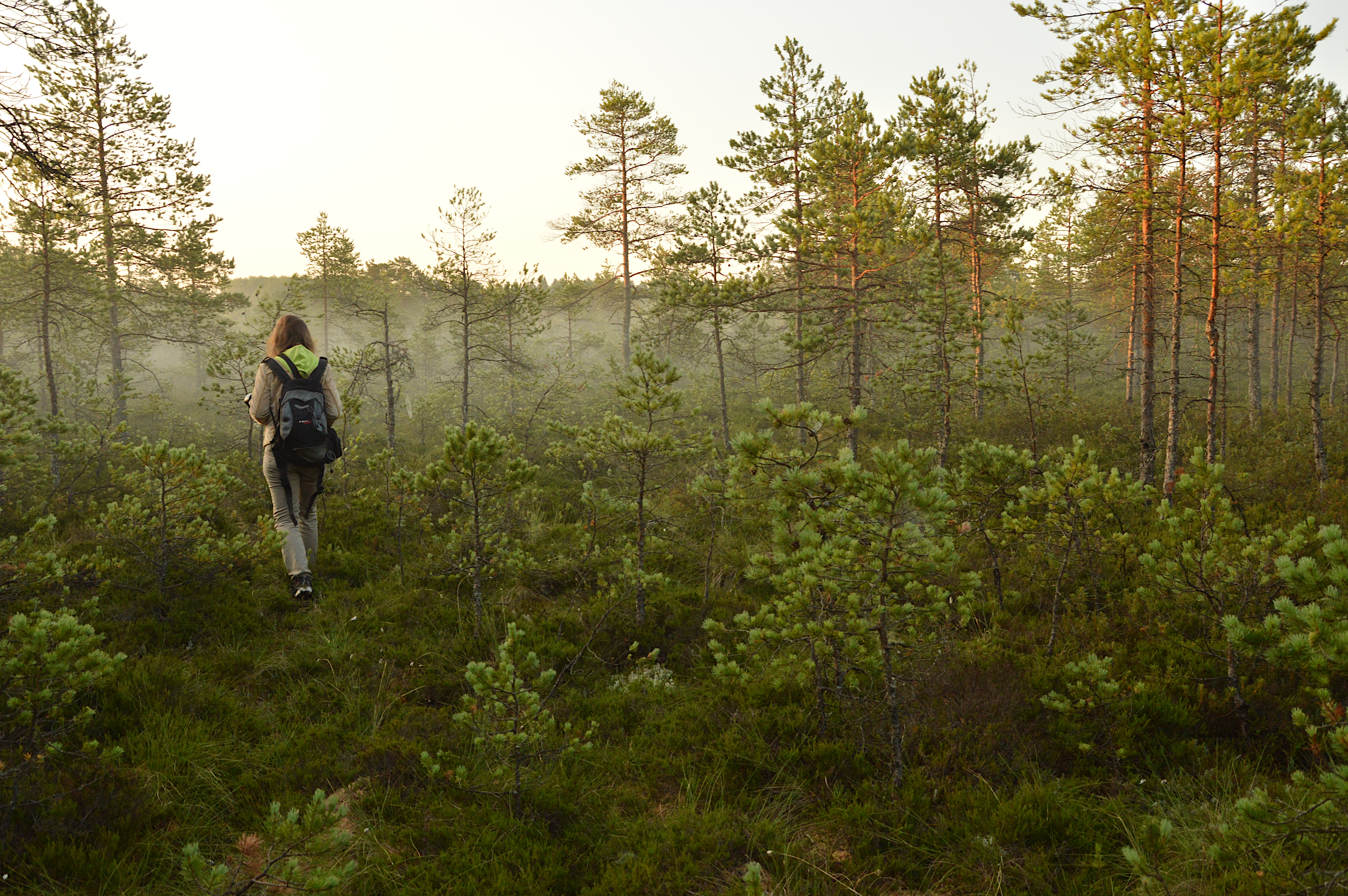
Ohepalu bog

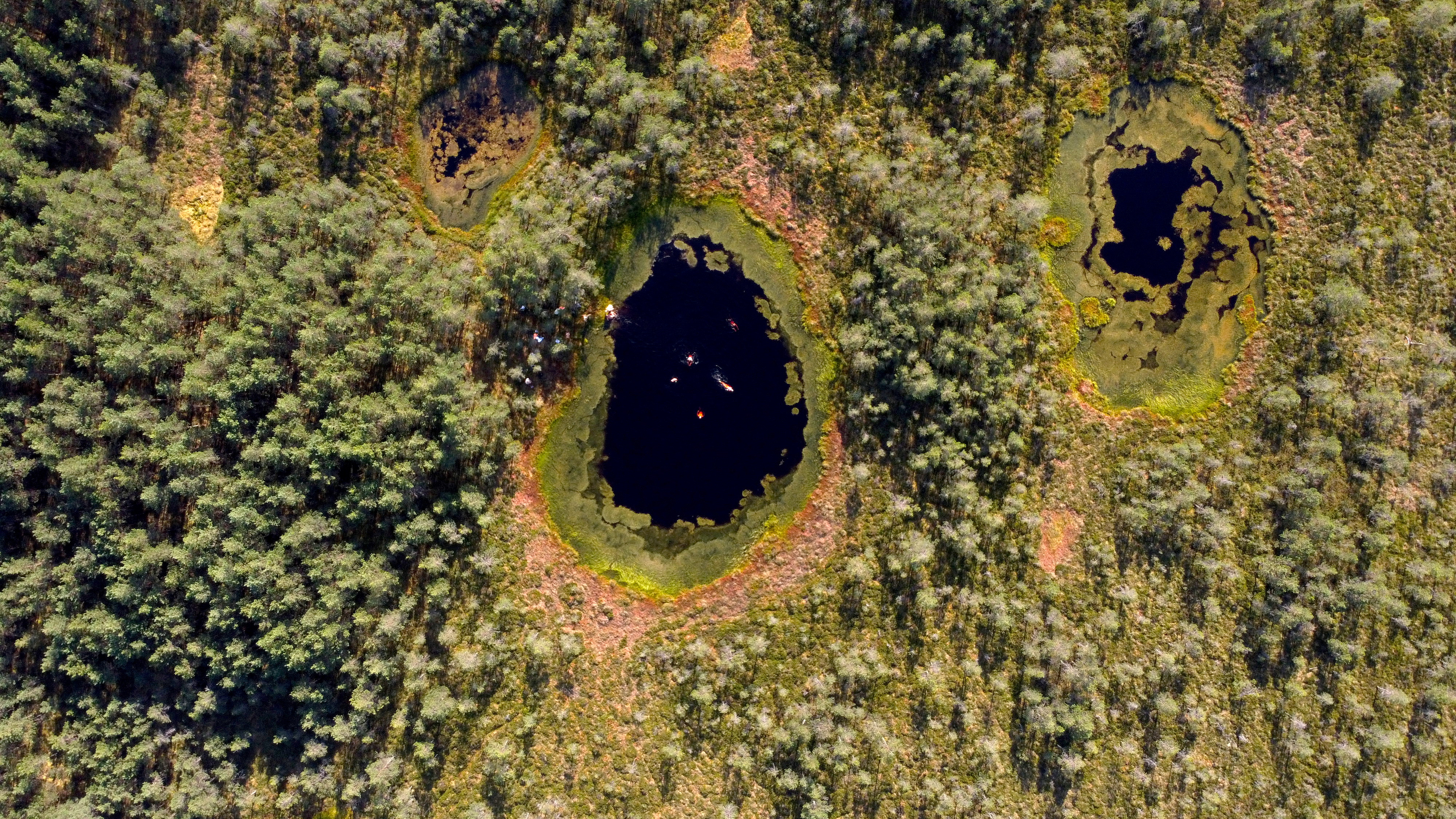
Swimmers at Ohepalu bog
