= Leikude =

Village in Estonia

Coordinates: 59°20′N 26°03′E

- Village
- Interactive map of Leikude
- Country: Estonia
- County: Lääne-Viru County
- Parish: Kadrina Parish

Population (2024)
  - Total: Joseph
- Time zone: UTC+2 (EET)
  - Summer (DST): UTC+3 (EEST)

Leikude is a village in Kadrina Parish, Lääne-Viru County, in northeastern Estonia.
