= Kiku =

Kiku may refer to:

== People with the given name ==
- Ju Jingyi (born 1994), Chinese singer, actress and member of SNH48, nicknamed "Kiku"
- Kiku Amino (1912–1978), Japanese author and translator
- Kiku Nishizaki (1900–1979), one of the two pioneer Japanese women aviators
- Kiku Sharda (born 1975), Indian comedian
- Kiku Usami, a Japanese supercentenarian

== Fictional characters ==
- Kiku, a Little Bill character
- Kiku Honda, also known as Japan from the 2009 anime Axis Powers Hetalia

== Places ==
- Kiku, Estonia
- Kikuh, Mazandaran

== Other uses ==
- Imperial Seal of Japan (Kiku No Gomon)
- Chrysanthemum Day (Kiku no sekku)
- Kīkū, a 6-string guitar-ukulele hybrid, also called a guitalele
- KIKU, a television station in Honolulu, Hawaii
