= Võduvere, Lääne-Viru County =

Village in Estonia

Coordinates: 59°19′25″N 26°08′31″E

Võduvere
- Village
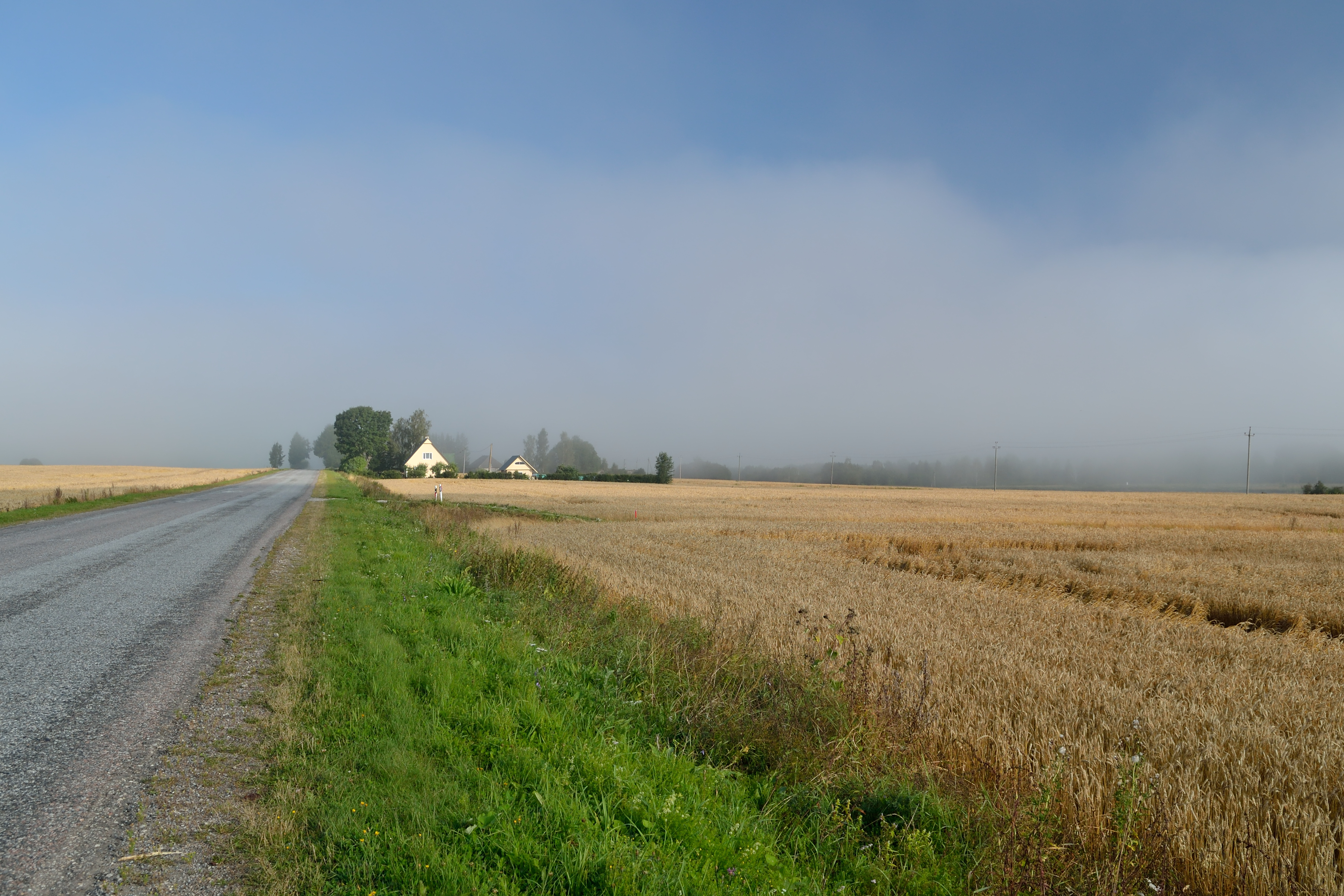
- Interactive map of Võduvere
- Country: Estonia
- County: Lääne-Viru County
- Parish: Kadrina Parish
- Time zone: UTC+2 (EET)
  - Summer (DST): UTC+3 (EEST)

Võduvere is a village in Kadrina Parish, Lääne-Viru County, in north-eastern Estonia. It lies on the left bank of the Loobu River, just south-west of Kadrina, the administrative centre of the municipality.
