= Pikkjärv (Viitna) =

Lake in Estonia

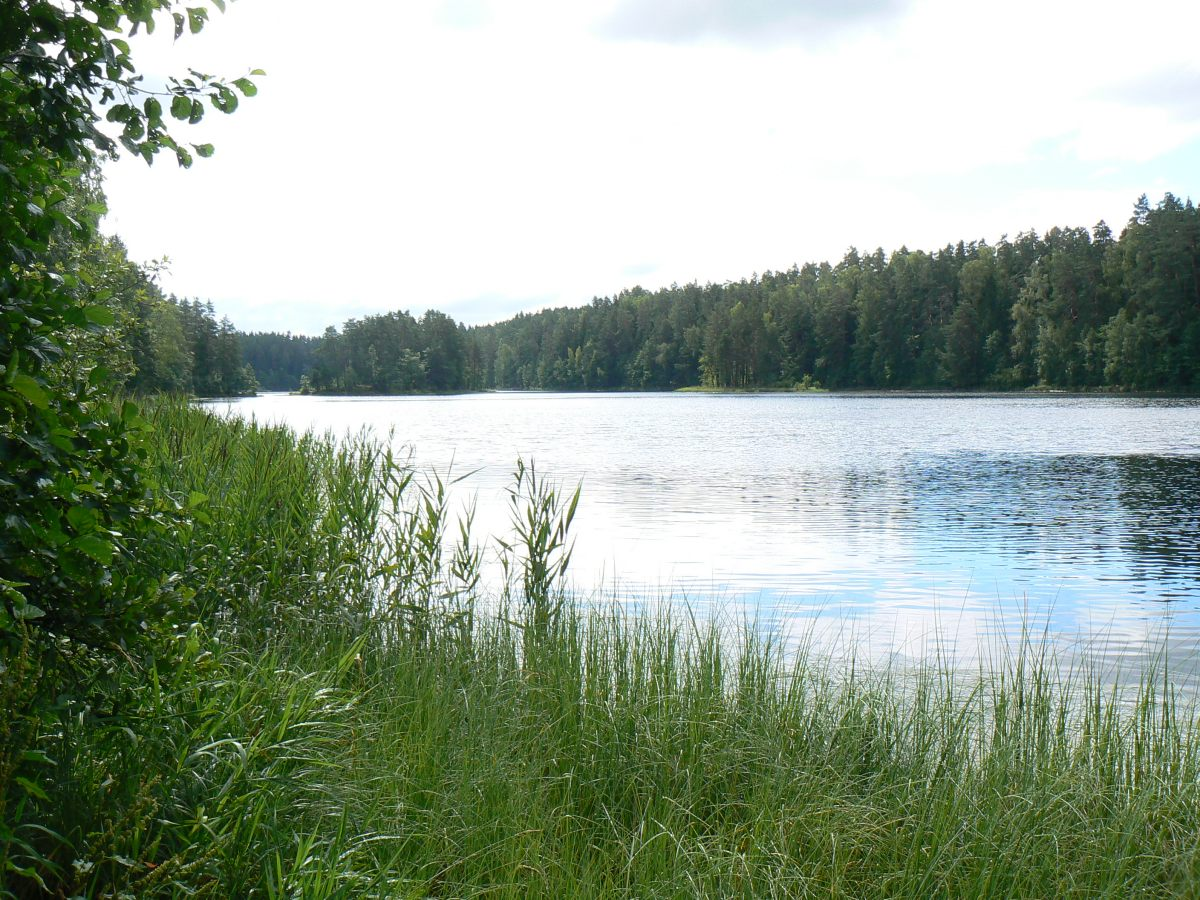

- Location within Estonia
- Location: Viitna, Kadrina Parish, Lääne-Viru County, Estonia
- Coordinates: 59°26′40″N 26°0′39″E
- Catchment area: 1.1 km^{2} (0.42 sq mi; 270 acres)
- Max. length: 950 meters (3,120 ft)
- Max. width: 250 meters (820 ft)
- Surface area: 16.1 hectares (40 acres)
- Average depth: 3.4 meters (11 ft)
- Max. depth: 6.2 meters (20 ft)
- Water volume: 555,000 cubic meters (19,600,000 cu ft)
- Shore length^{1}: 2,700 meters (8,900 ft)
- Surface elevation: 75.3 meters (247 ft)
- Islands: 3
- ^{1} Shore length is not a well-defined measure.

Pikkjärv (also Viitna Pikkjärv, Suur Viitna järv, or Suurjärv) is a lake in Estonia. It is located in the village of Viitna in Kadrina Parish, Lääne-Viru County. A smaller lake called Linajärv is located about 1.5 meters (4 ft 11 in) to the northeast.

== Physical description ==
The lake has an area of 16.1 hectares (40 acres), and it has three islands with a combined area of 0.3 hectares (0.74 acres). The lake has an average depth of 3.4 meters (11 ft) and a maximum depth of 6.2 meters (20 ft). It is 950 meters (3,120 ft) long, and its shoreline measures 2,700 meters (8,900 ft). It has a volume of 555,000 cubic meters (19,600,000 cu ft).

== See also ==
- Linajärv
