= Hulja =

Borough in Estonia

- Location within Estonia
- Coordinates: 59°21′8″N 26°12′51″E
- Country: Estonia
- County: Lääne-Viru County
- Time zone: UTC+2 (EET)

Hulja (German: Huljel) is a small town (alevik) in Kadrina Parish, Lääne-Viru County in northern Estonia.

The population was 477 on December 31, 2011.

The biggest local company is Aru Grupp with four factories and about 180 employees in Hulja.

== Gallery ==
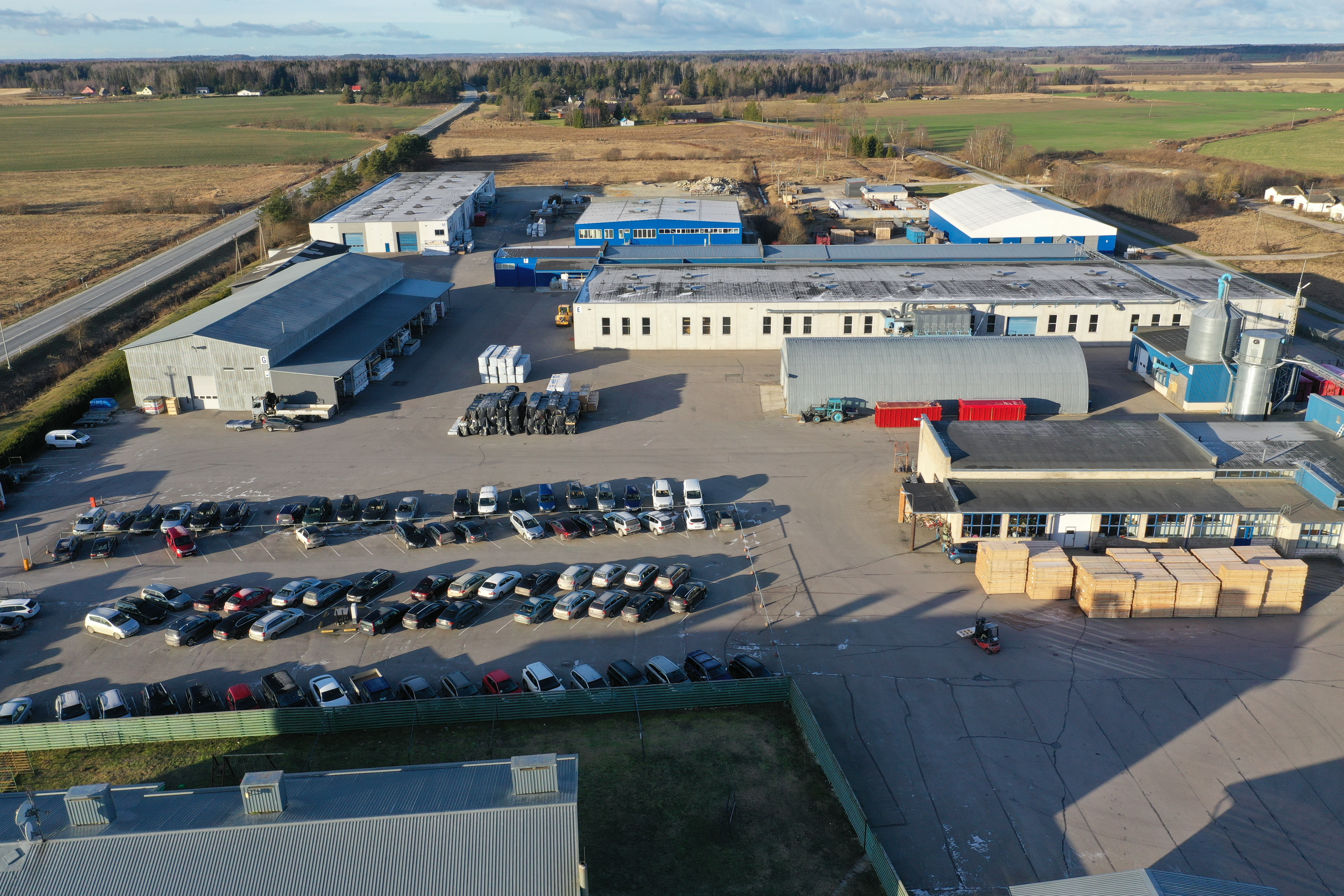
Aru Grupp production complex in Hulja

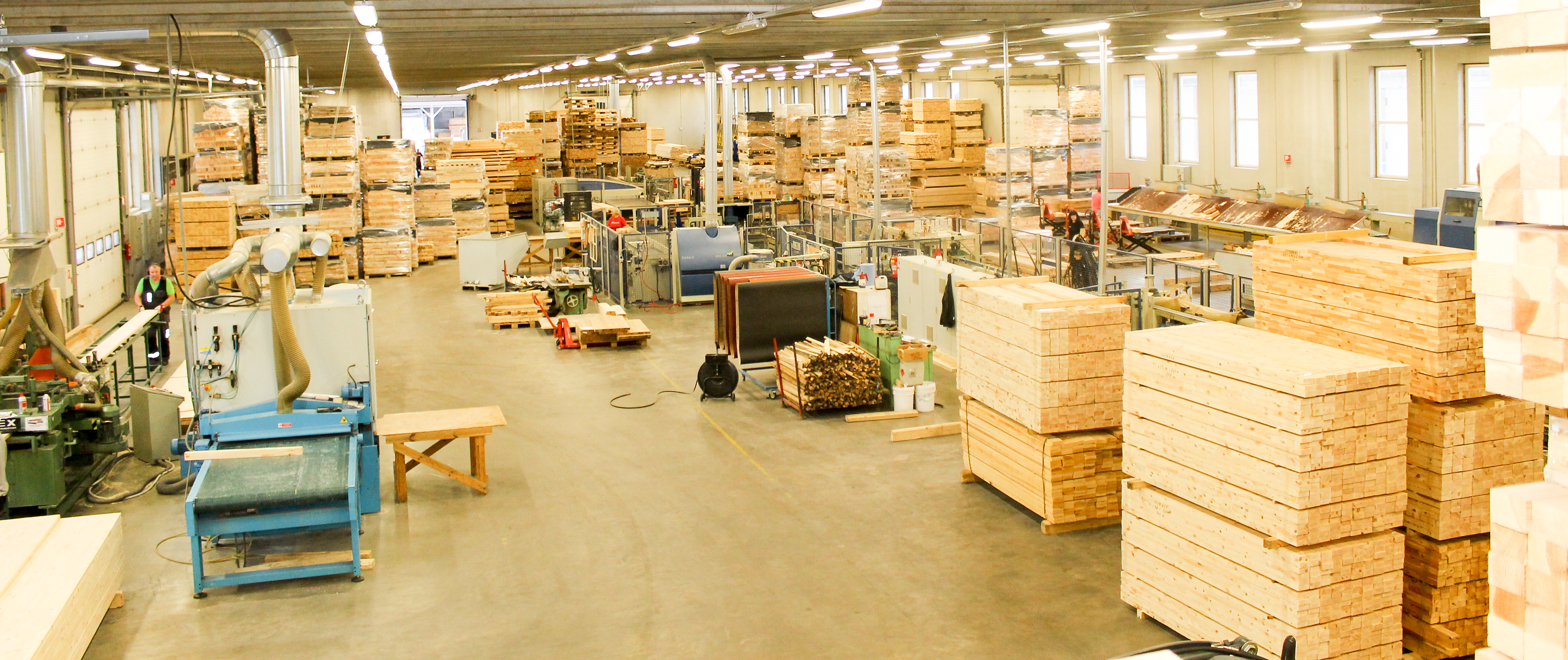
Aru Grupp

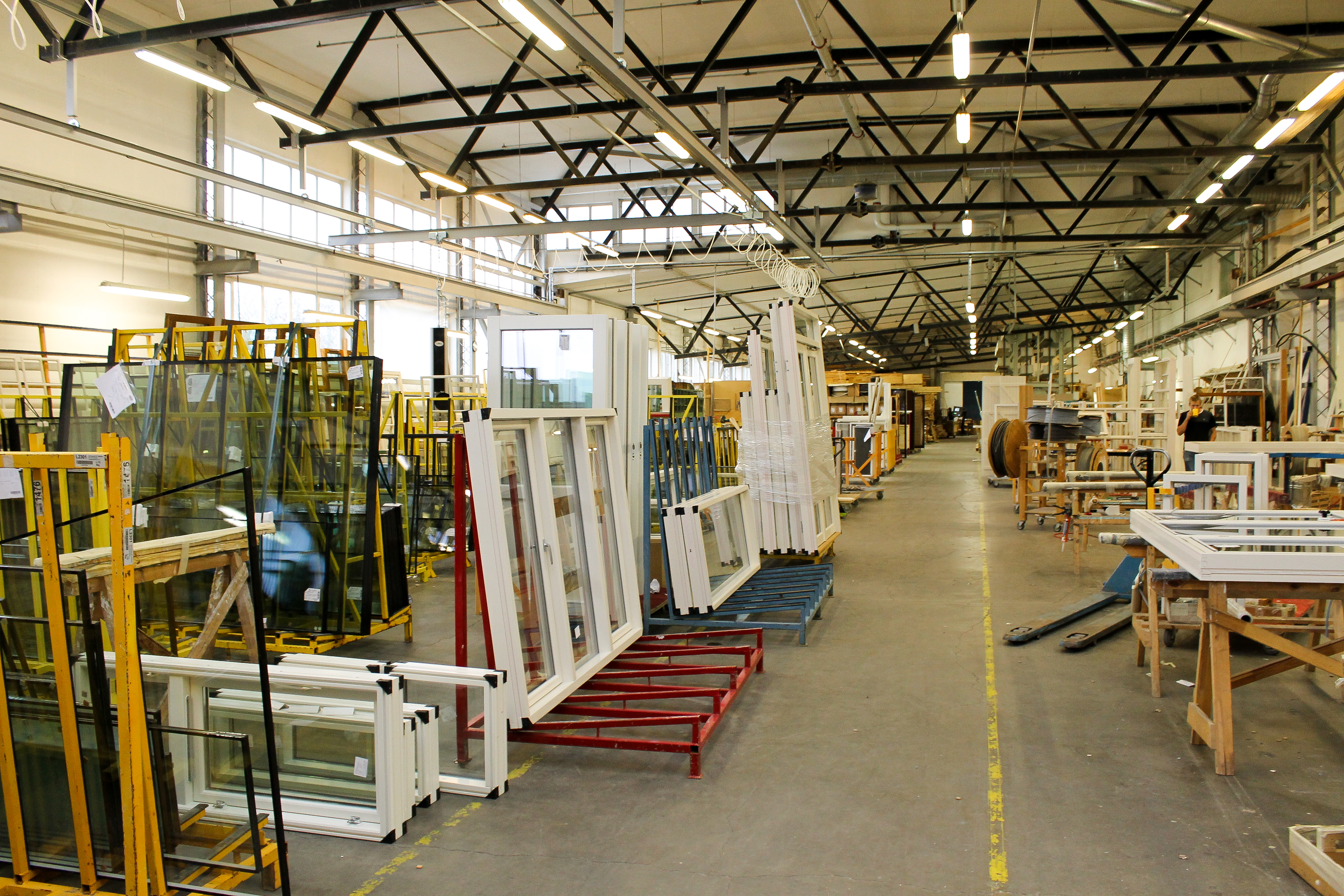
Aru Grupp
