= Pariisi =

Village in Estonia

Coordinates: 59°17′N 26°08′E

- Village
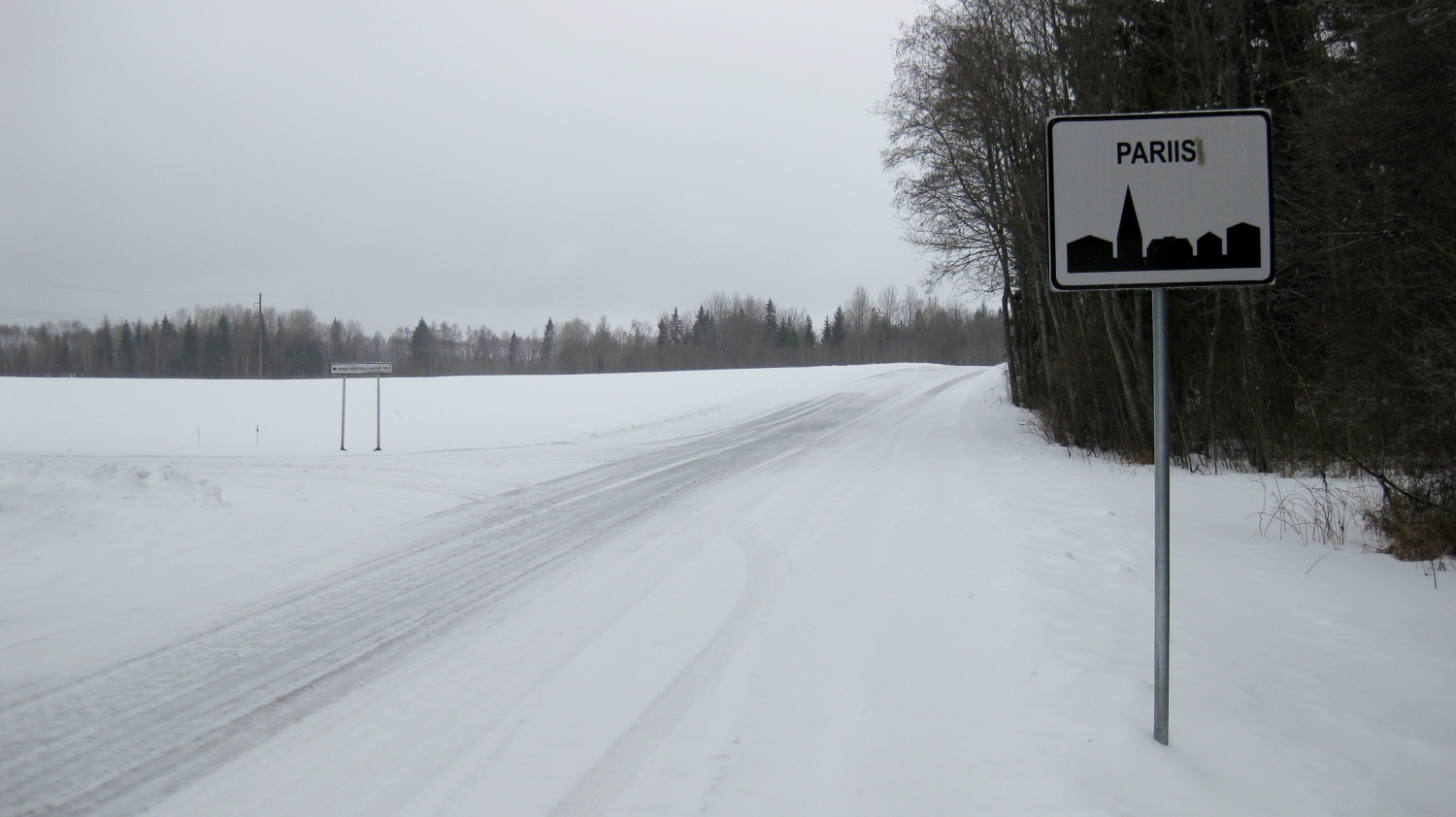
- Sign of Pariisi village.
- Interactive map of Pariisi
- Country: Estonia
- County: Lääne-Viru County
- Parish: Kadrina Parish
- Time zone: UTC+2 (EET)
  - Summer (DST): UTC+3 (EEST)

Pariisi is a village in Kadrina Parish, Lääne-Viru County, in northeastern Estonia.
