= Vohnja =

Village in Estonia

- Village
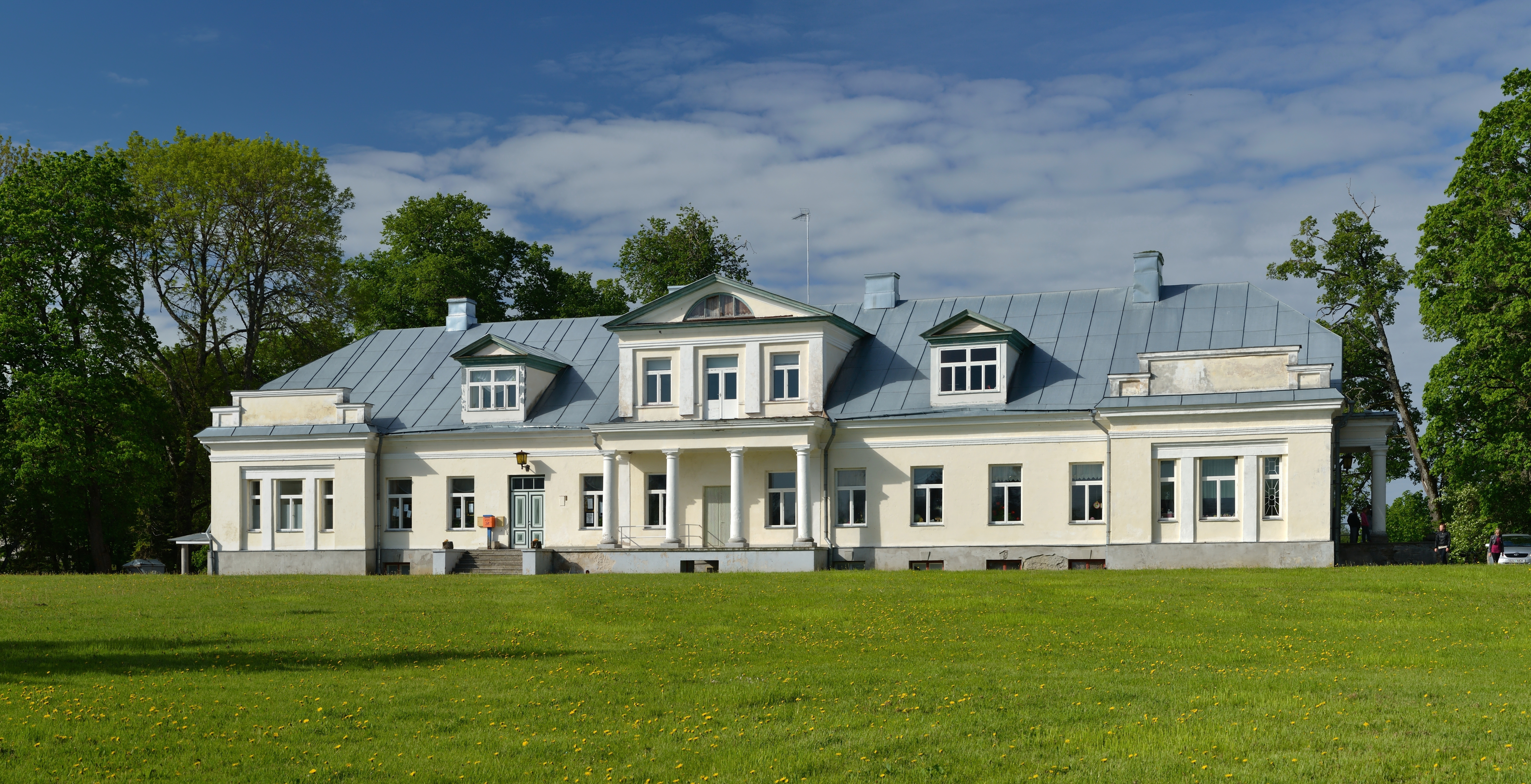
- Vohnja manor main building

- Location in Estonia
- Coordinates: 59°22′00″N 26°03′00″E
- Country: Estonia
- County: Lääne-Viru County
- Parish: Kadrina Parish

Population (2019)
  - Total: 119
- Time zone: UTC+2 (EET)
  - Summer (DST): UTC+3 (EEST)

Vohnja is a village in Kadrina Parish, Lääne-Viru County, in northeastern Estonia. It lies on the left bank of the Loobu River.

== Vohnja manor ==
Vohnja (German: Fonal) manor has a history going back to at least 1504, when the estate was owned by the van der Heyde family. Later, in 1629 during the time of Swedish rule in Estonia, it is recorded to have belonged to the Oxenstierna family. Later it belonged to different Baltic German families, the last of which was Tiesenhausen. The family acquired the estate in 1837 and it stayed in the family until the land reform that followed the Estonian Declaration of Independence in 1919. After the Soviet invasion of Estonia the main building became the office of a kolkhoz, and it stayed so until Estonia re-gained its independence. In 1991, it was turned into a kindergarten.

The presently visible main building dates from the 1830s and is designed in a Neoclassical style. The interiors have largely been destroyed. Adjacent to the main building are also a number of preserved annexes, such as the estate manager's house (1904), granary (1805) and distillery (19th century).
