= Viitna =

Village in Estonia

- village
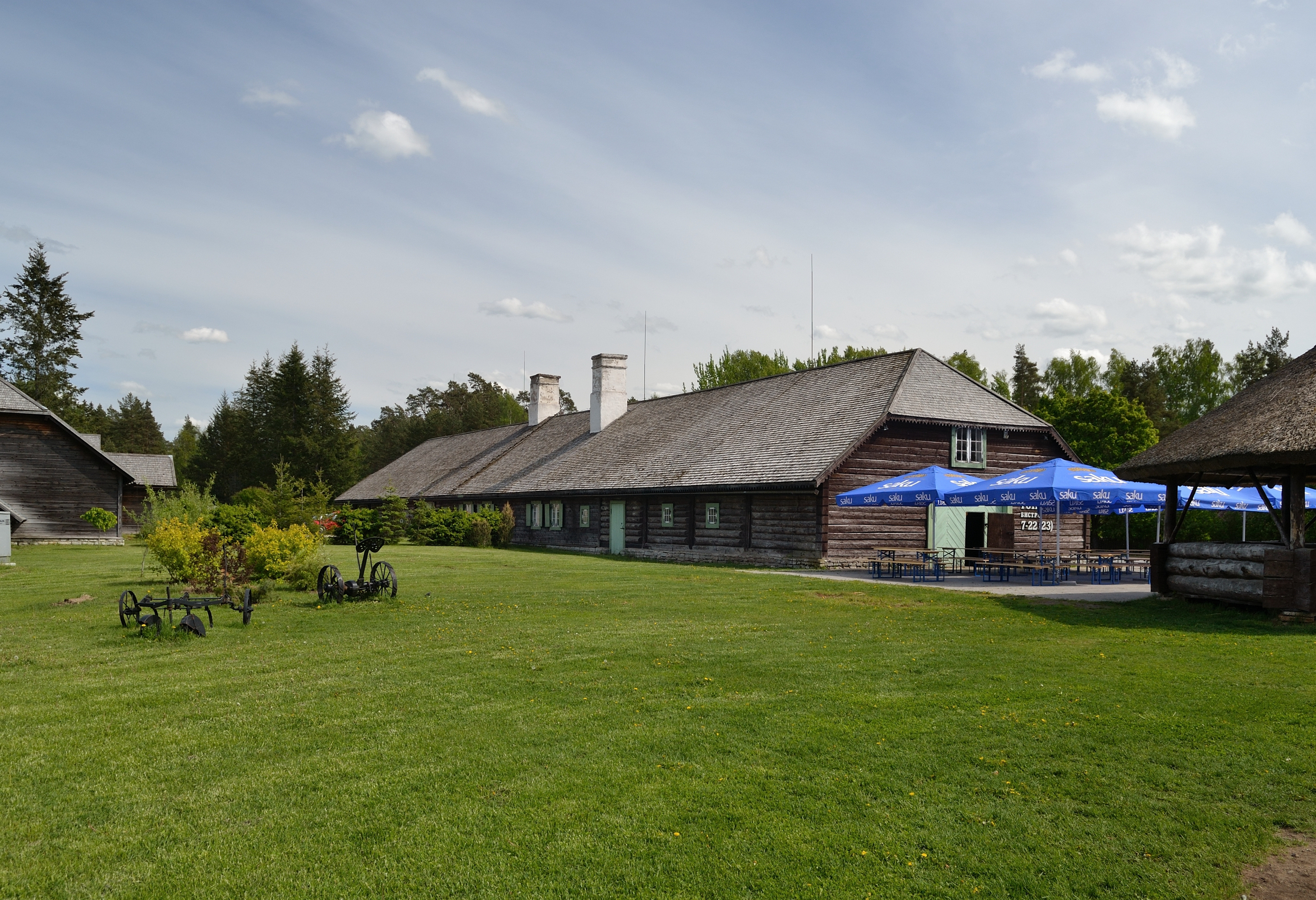
- Viitna tavern

- Location in Estonia
- Coordinates: 59°27′23″N 26°00′50″E
- Country: Estonia
- County: Lääne-Viru County
- Municipality: Kadrina Parish

Population (01.01.2007)
  - Total: 83

Viitna is a village in Kadrina Parish, Lääne-Viru County, in northern Estonia. It's located on the Tallinn–Narva road (Estonian main road nr. 1; part of E20), about 71 km east of Tallinn. Viitna has a population of 83 (as of 1 January 2007).

Viitna is best known for the historical tavern (Viitna Inn) situated by the road. It was first mentioned in 1768, since then it has burned down a few times, the last fire was in 1989. Today the tavern is restored, a restaurant and a post office are operating there.

The lakes Viitna Pikkjärv and Viitna Linajärv are located in the southern part of the village.

== Gallery ==
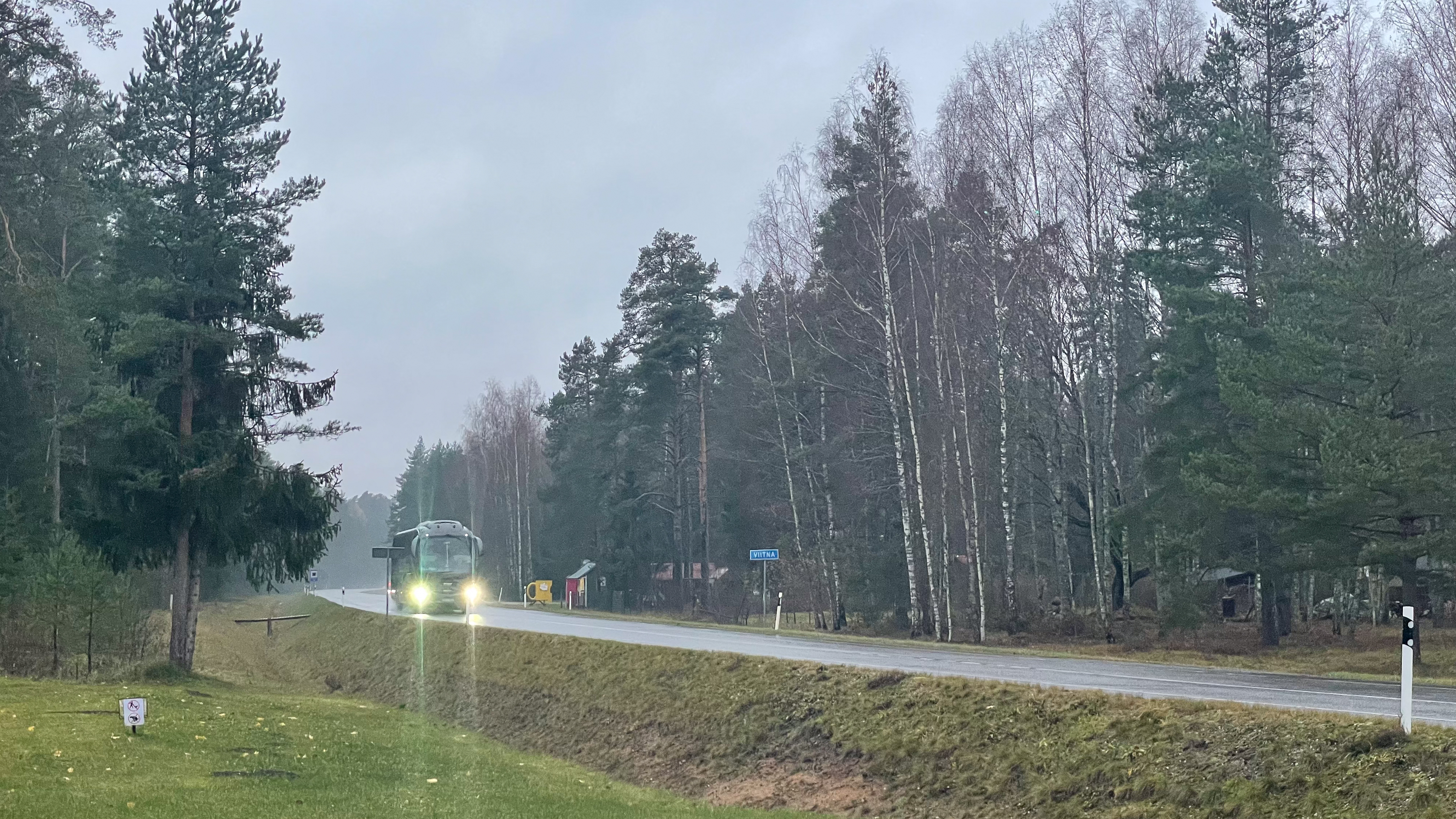
Viitna Village

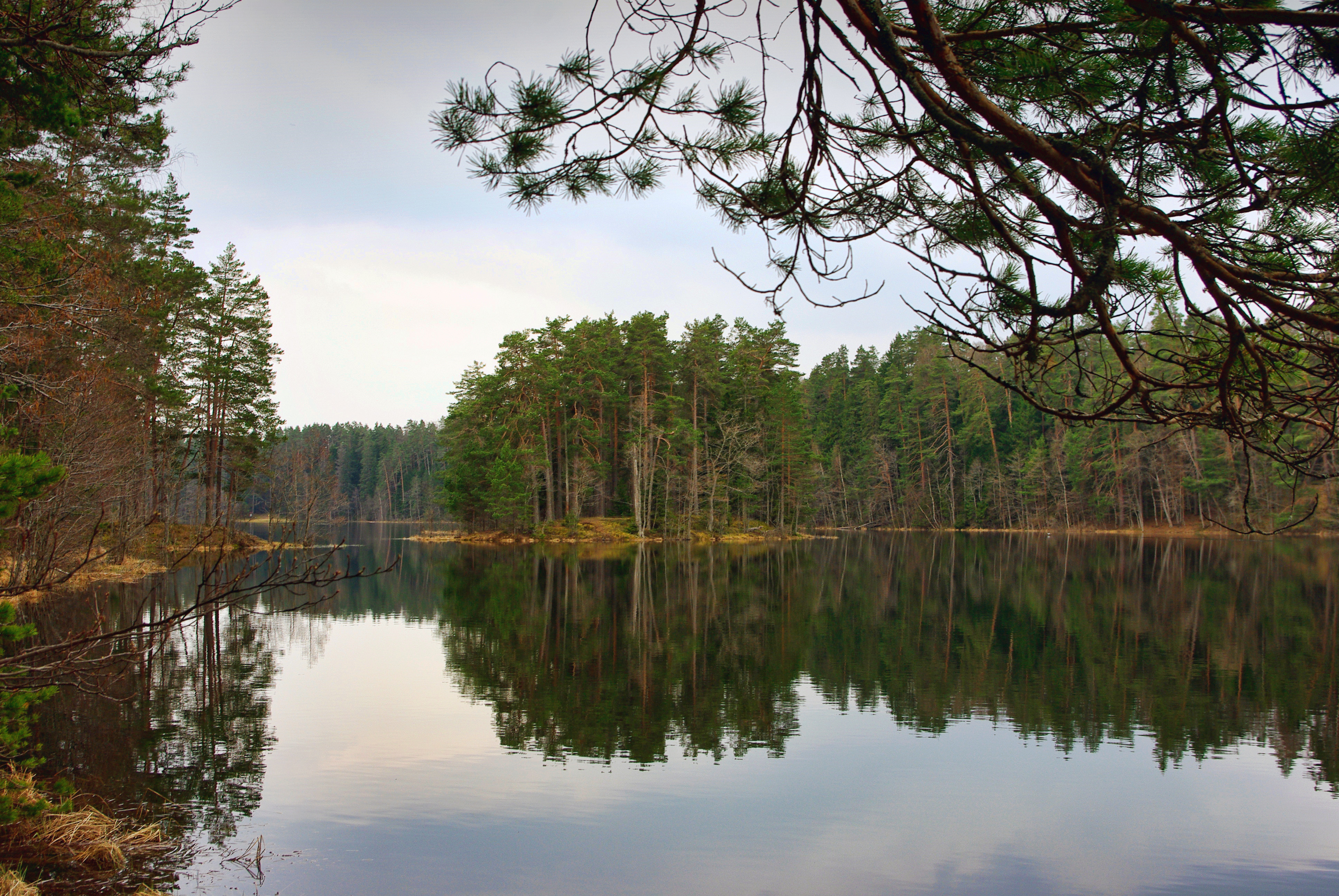
Viitna Pikkjärv

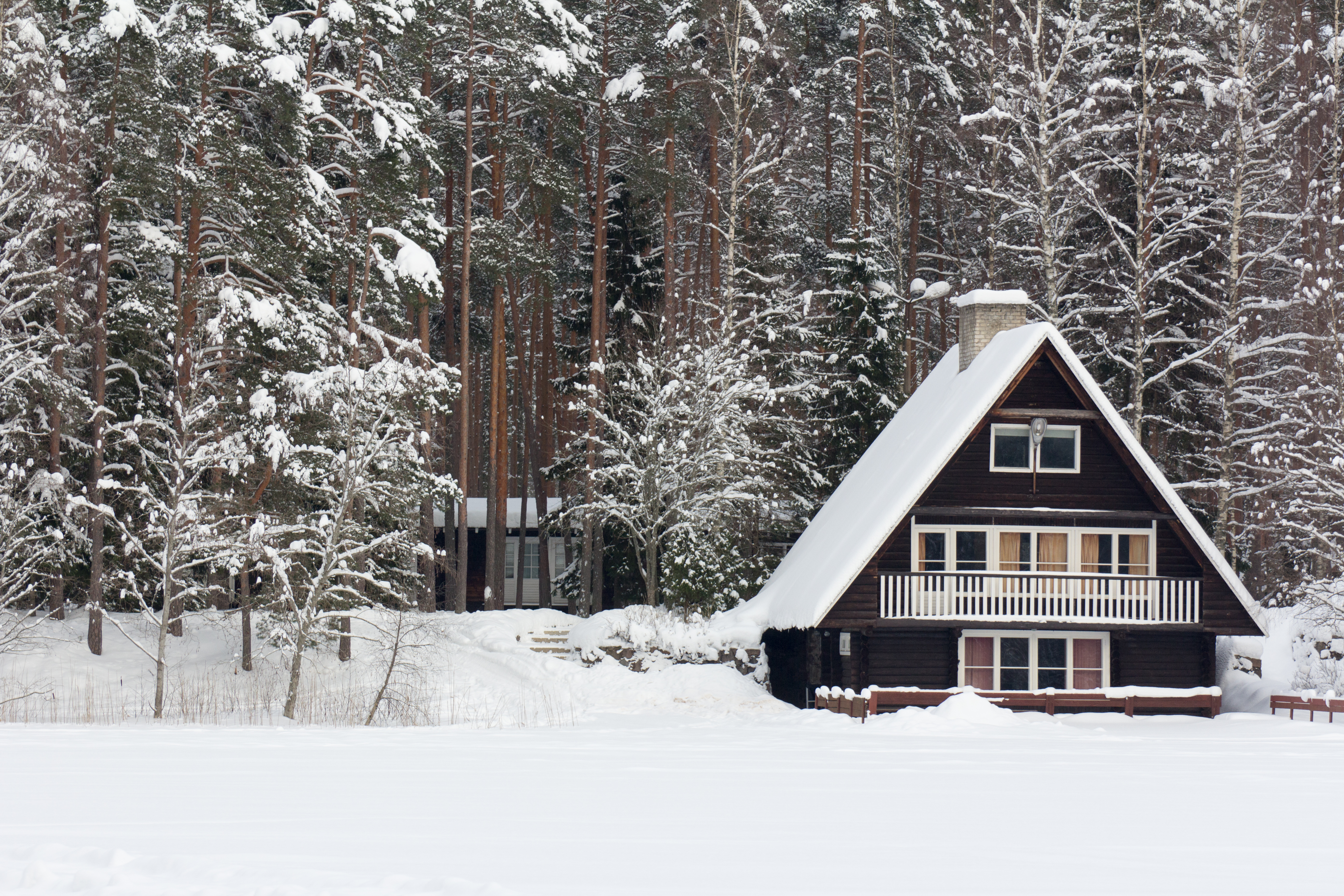
Viitna Linajärv Lake
