= Saksi Parish =

Former municipality of Estonia

Saksi Parish Saksi vald
- Former municipality of Estonia
- Interactive map of Saksi Parish
- Coordinates: 59.2444°N 26.1125°E
- Country: Estonia
- Administrative centre: Moe

Saksi Parish (Estonian: Saksi vald) was a rural municipality of Estonia, in Lääne-Viru County. It had a population of 1196 (2003) and an area of 109,3 km².

== Populated places ==
Saksi Parish had 14 villages.
