= Kadrina =

Borough in Estonia

- Small borough
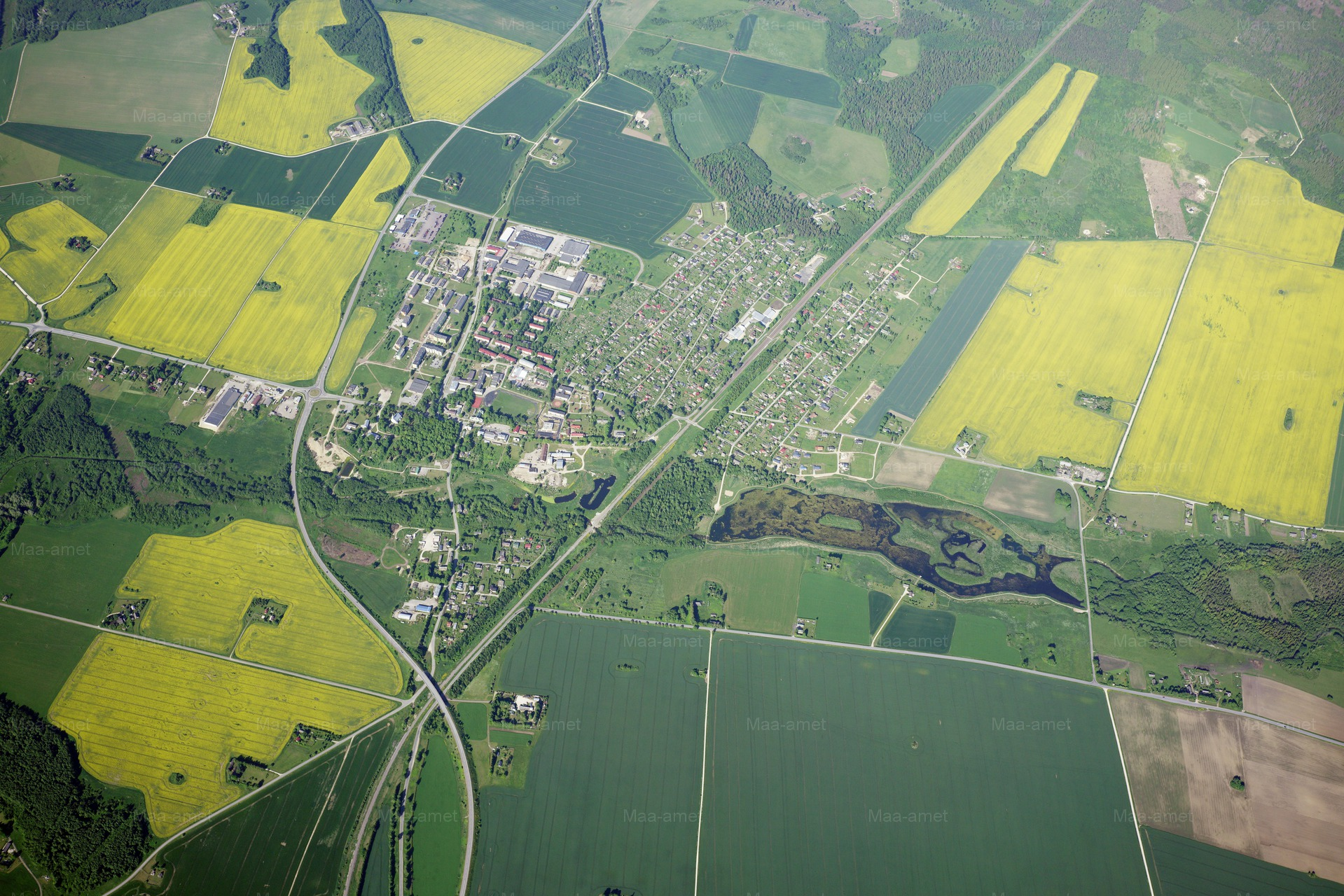
- Aerial view of Kadrina

- Location in Estonia
- Coordinates: 59°20′30″N 26°07′51″E
- Country: Estonia
- County: Lääne-Viru County
- Municipality: Kadrina Parish

Population (2011 Census)
  - Total: 2,269

Kadrina German: Sankt Katharinen) is a small borough (Estonian: alevik) in Lääne-Viru County, northern Estonia. It is the administrative centre of Kadrina Parish. Kadrina is located in the crossing point of Tallinn–Saint Petersburg (Tallinn–Narva) railway, Pärnu–Rakvere road (nr. 5) and the Loobu River. The nearest towns are Rakvere (12 km east) and Tapa (12 km southwest).

As of the 2011 census, the settlement's population was 2,269.

The name of Kadrina is derived from the St. Catherine's church and parish which establishment dates back to 1231. Earlier name of the settlement was Tõrvestevere (German: Tristfer).

The development from a village to larger settlement began after the Tallinn–Saint Petersburg railway was built and Kadrina railway station was established in 1870. A school was opened in 1902.

== Gallery ==
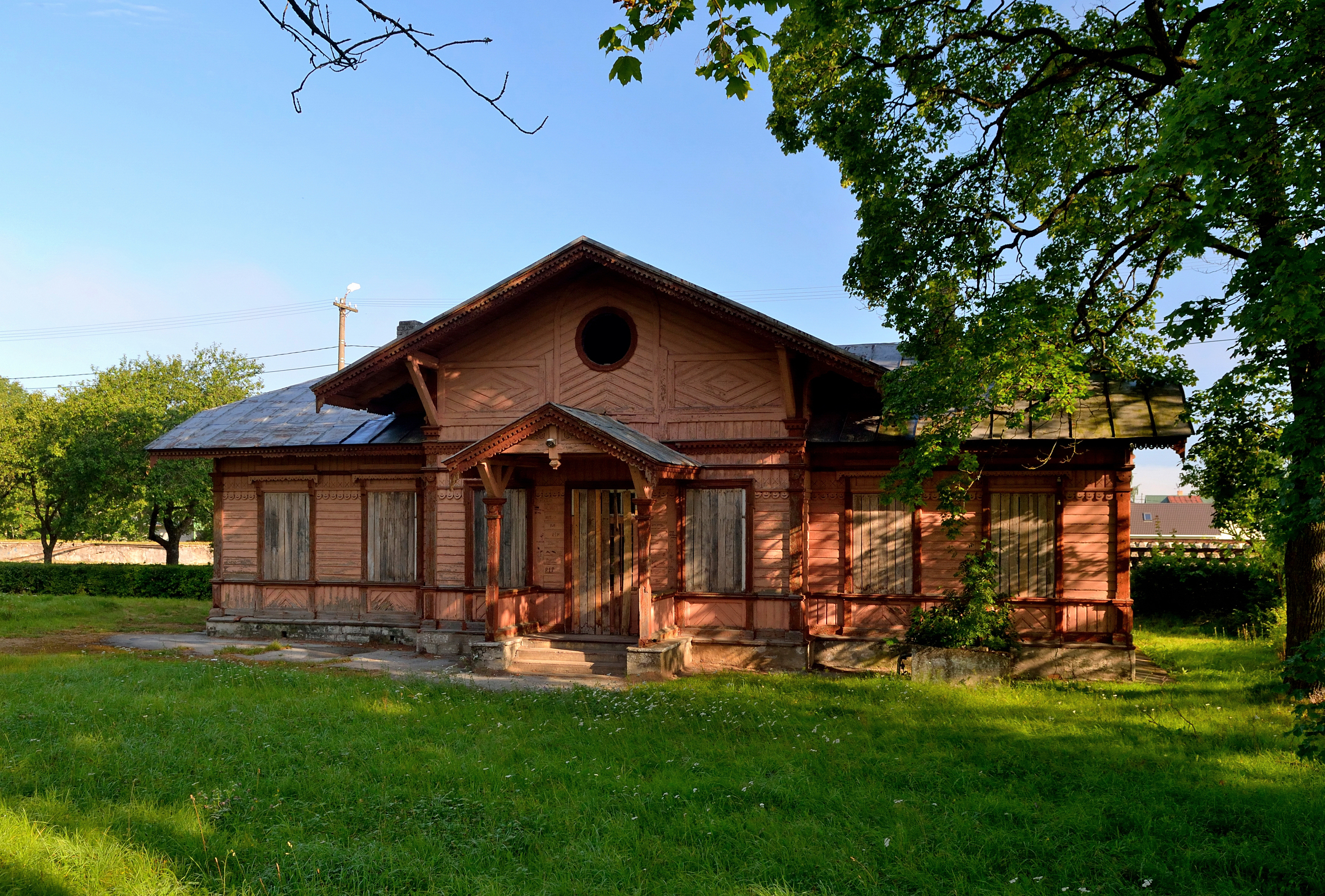
Kadrina railway station

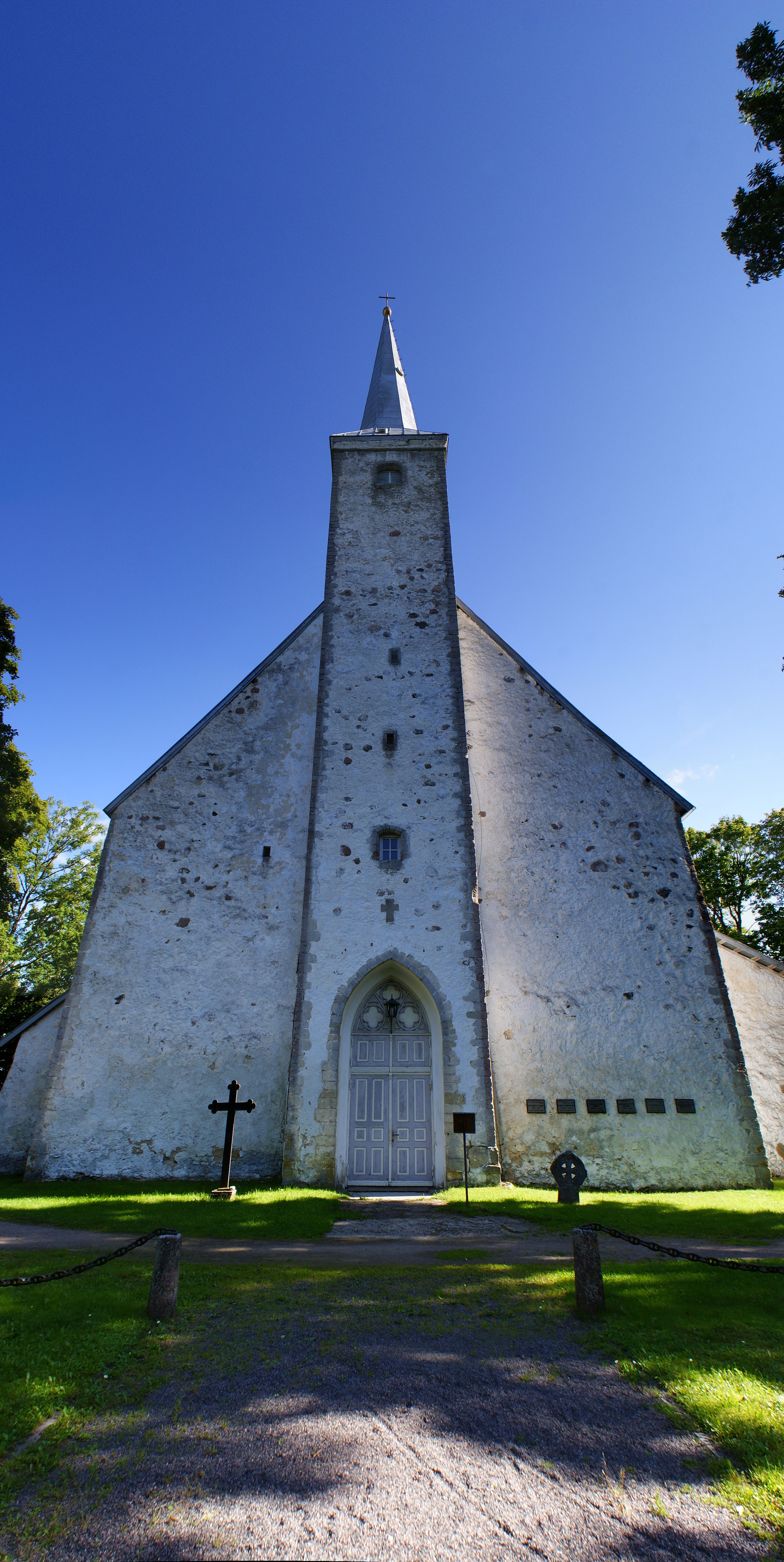
Kadrina church

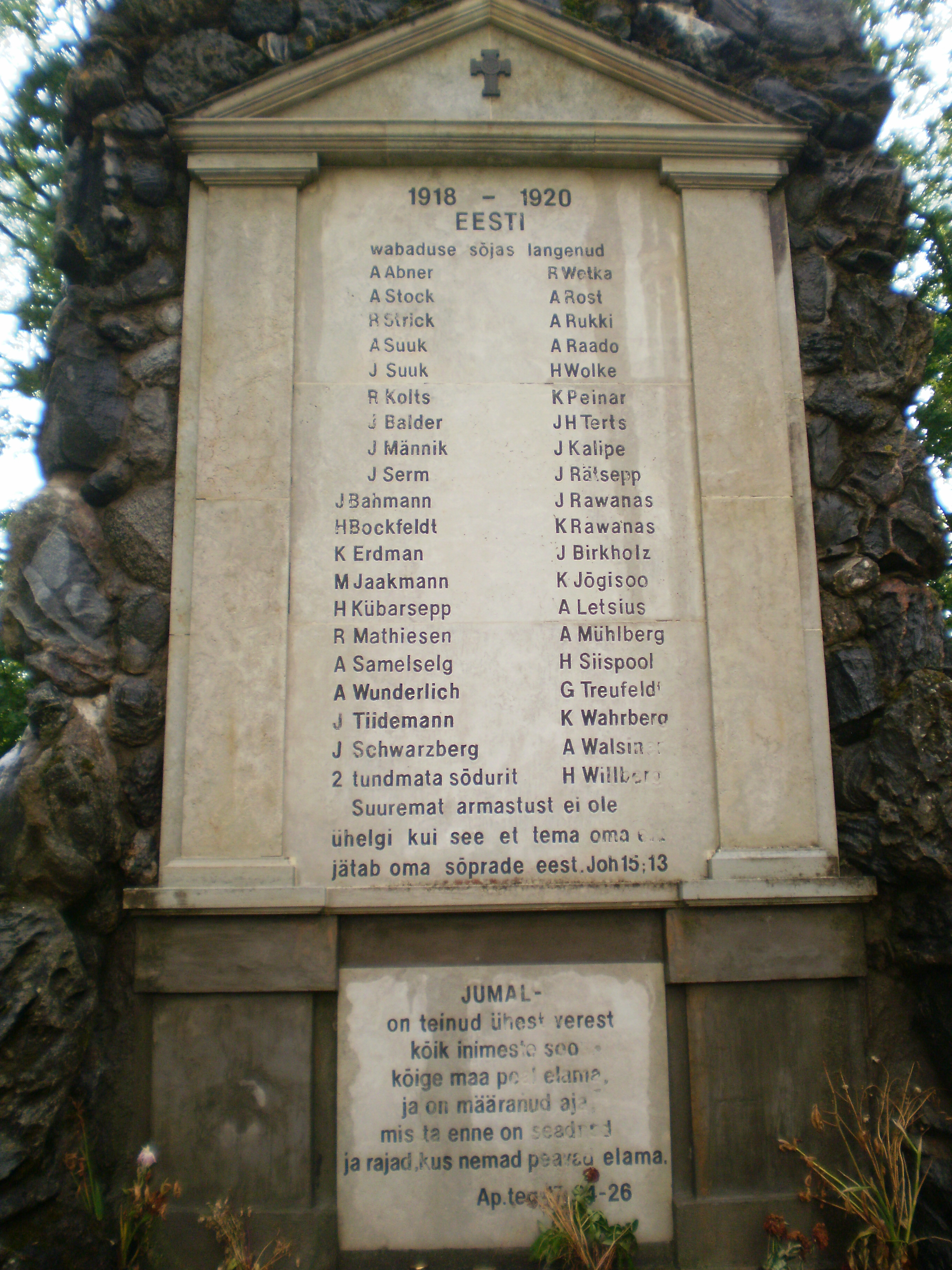
Memorial of War of Independence at Kadrina cemetery

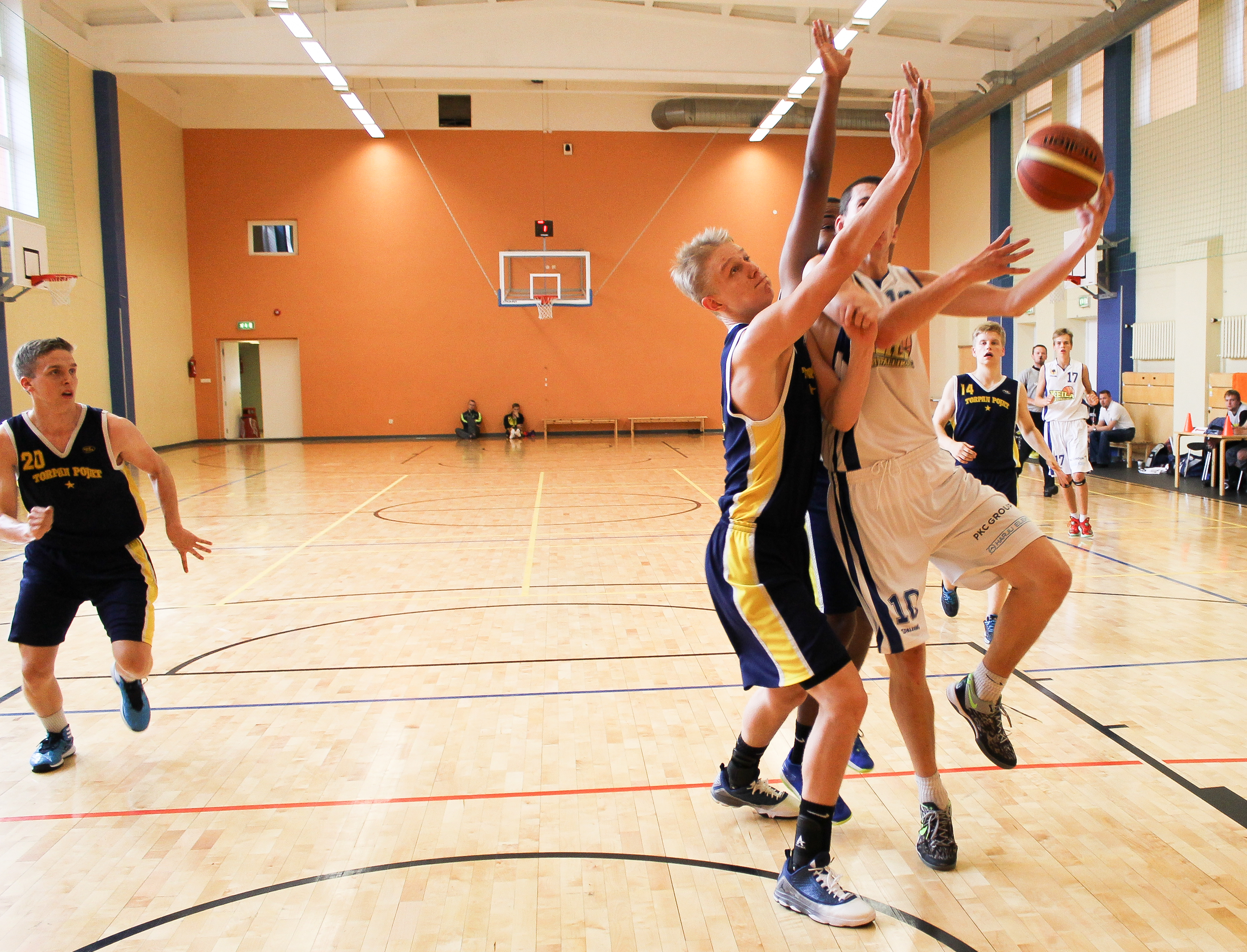
New Generation Mini Cup

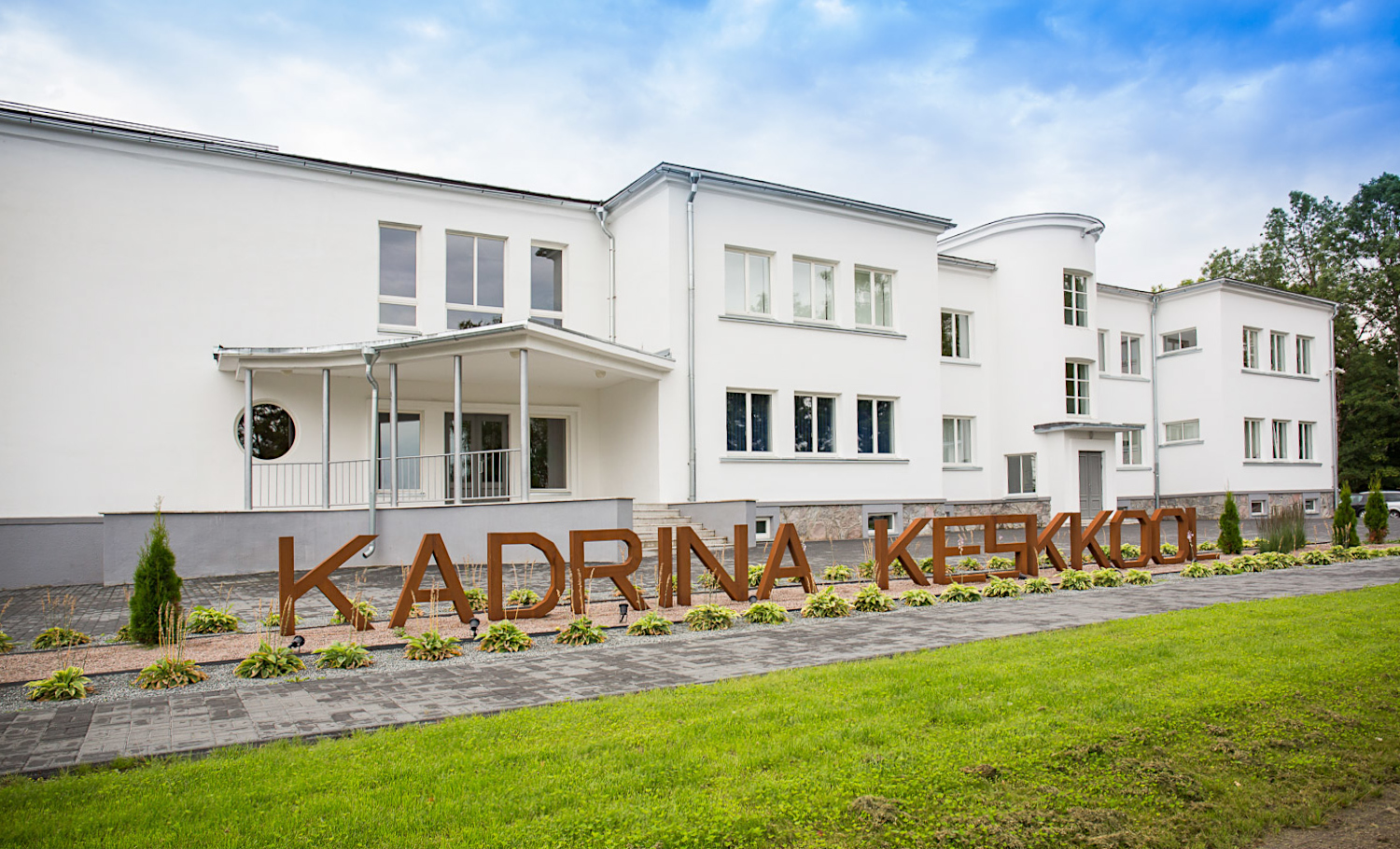
School

Preceding station	Elron	Following station
Tapa towards Tallinn	Tallinn–Narva	Rakvere towards Narva
