= Kadrina Parish =

Municipality of Estonia

Coordinates: 59.35°N 26.133333°E

Kadrina Parish Kadrina vald
- Municipality of Estonia
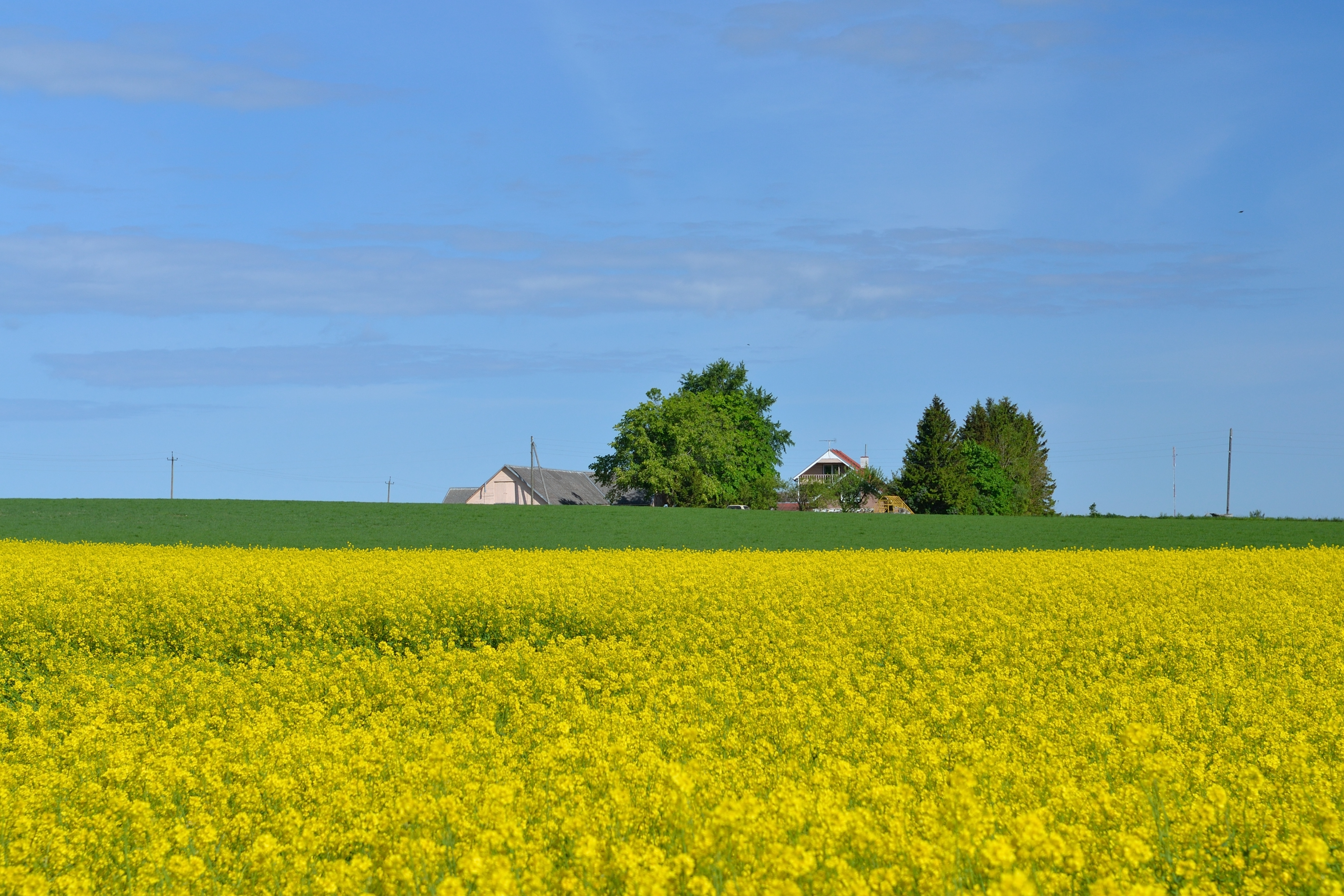
- Countryside near Kadapiku

- Flag Coat of arms

- Kadrina Parish within Lääne-Viru County
- Country: Estonia
- County: Lääne-Viru County
- Administrative centre: Kadrina

Government
  - Mayor: Siim Umerov

Area
  - Total: 329.26 km^{2} (127.13 sq mi)

Population (2026)
  - Total: 4,629
  - Density: 14.06/km^{2} (36.41/sq mi)
- ISO 3166 code: EE-272
- Website: www.kadrina.ee

Kadrina Parish (Estonian: Kadrina vald) is a rural municipality in Lääne-Viru County, northern Estonia. It covers an area of 329.26 km² (10% of the total area of the county) and has a population of 4,629 (as of 1 January, 2026). The parish has had its current borders since 2005, when Saksi Parish was dissolved and Kiku, Pariisi and Salda villages were merged to Kadrina Parish, the larger part of Saksi Parish was added to Tapa Parish.

The administrative centre is the small borough (alevik) of Kadrina, which has a population of 2,600. Other major populated places are the small borough of Hulja (600 inhabitants) and the villages of Kihlevere (200 inhabitants), Vohnja (200 inhabitants) and Viitna (100 inhabitants). There are 32 villages in total.

The northern border of the municipality is also the southern border of Lahemaa National Park.

The Tallinn–Narva road (nr 1, part of E20) and the Tallinn–Saint Petersburg railway run through Kadrina Parish.

== Demographics ==
As of 1 January 2026, the parish had 4,629 residents, of which 2,369 (51.2%) were women and 2,260 (48.8%) were men.

=== Religion ===
The majority of the older than fifteen years residents of Kadrina parish, 85.9% are religiously unaffiliated. Among those residents who do associate with a religion, 7.0% identify as Lutheran, 3.0% as Orthodox while other Christian denominations make up 1.5% of the population. 2.6% of the population follows other religions or did not specify their religious affiliation.

== Gallery ==
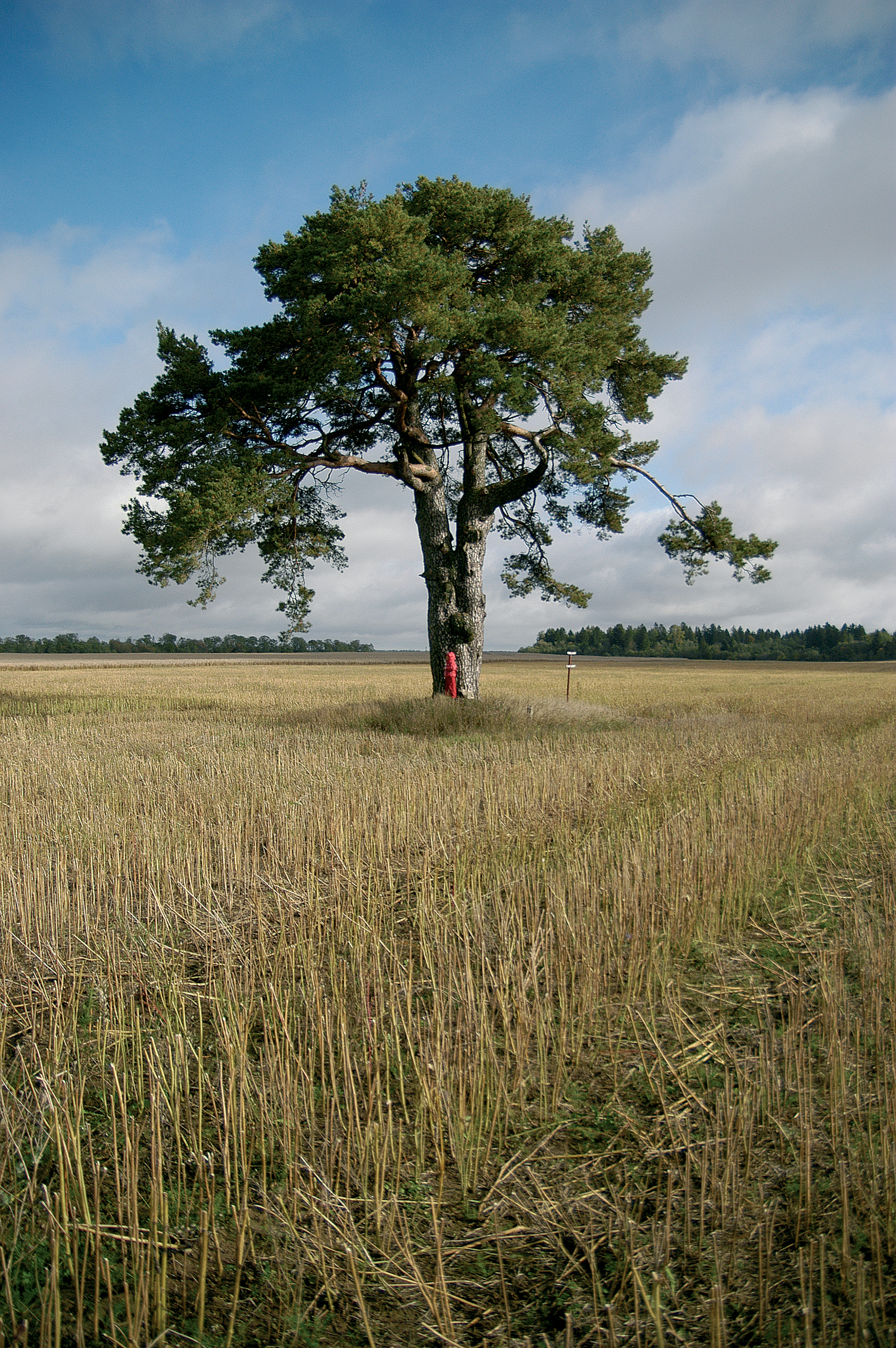
Kallukse pine

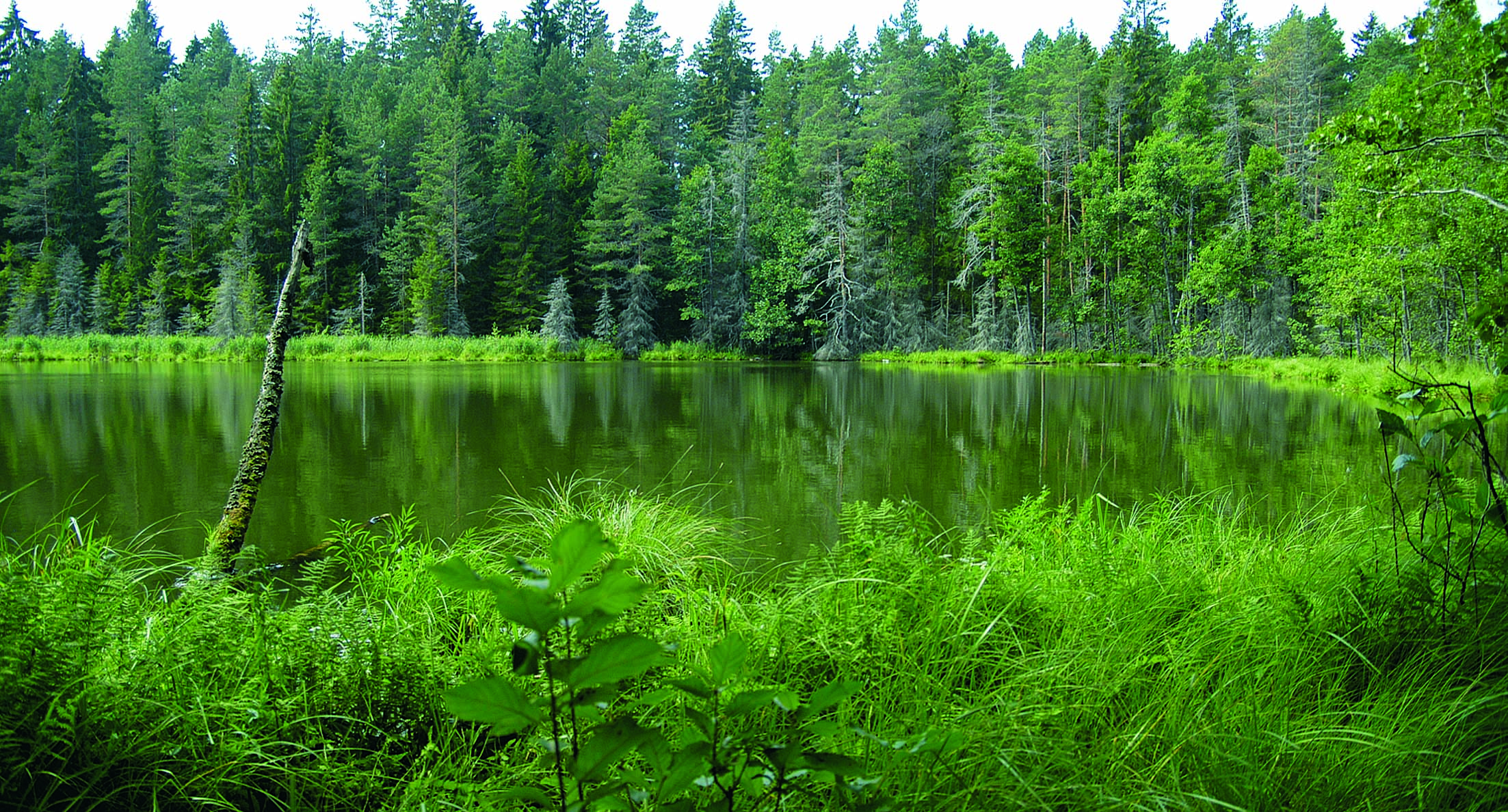
Nabudi lake

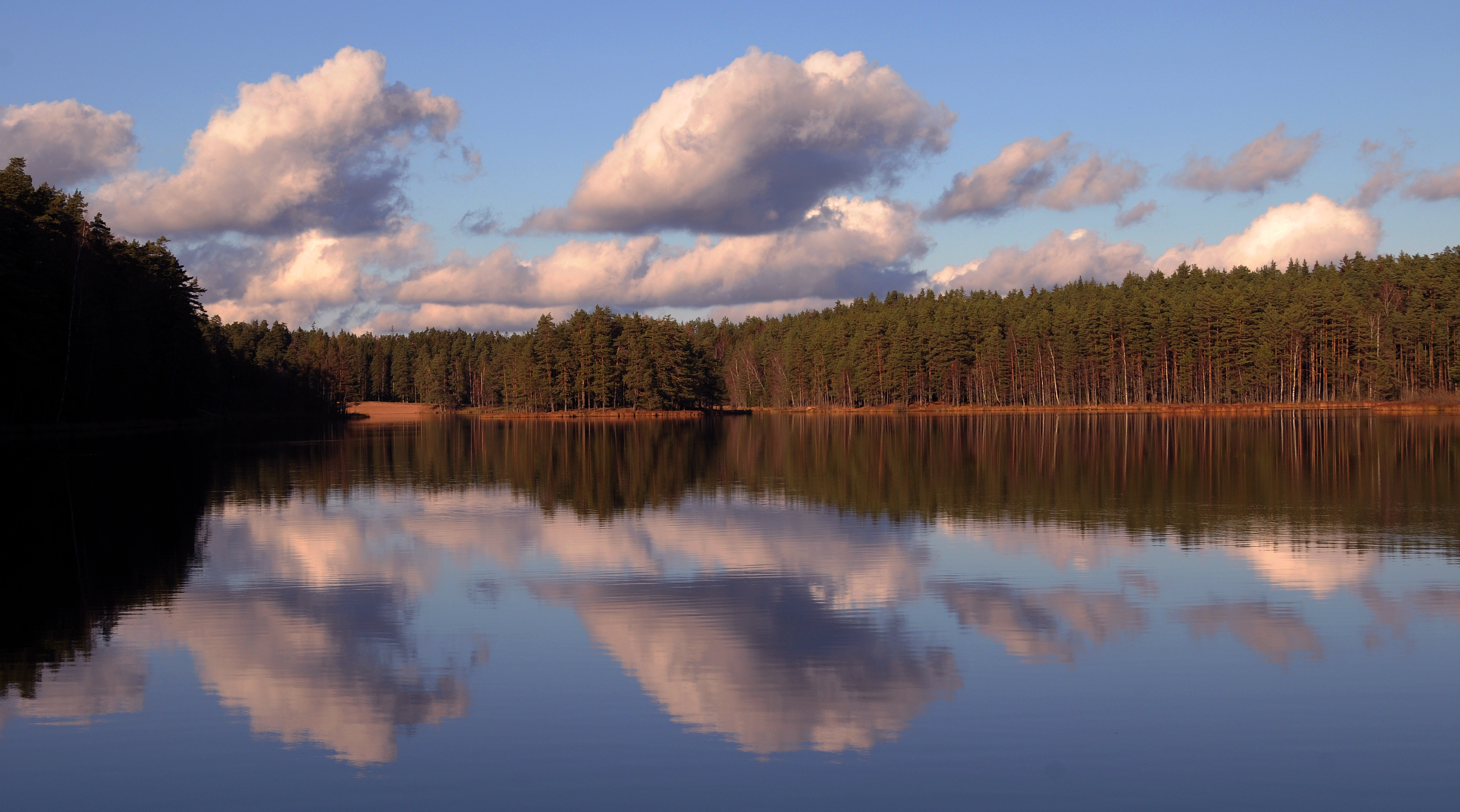
Viitna Pikkjärv

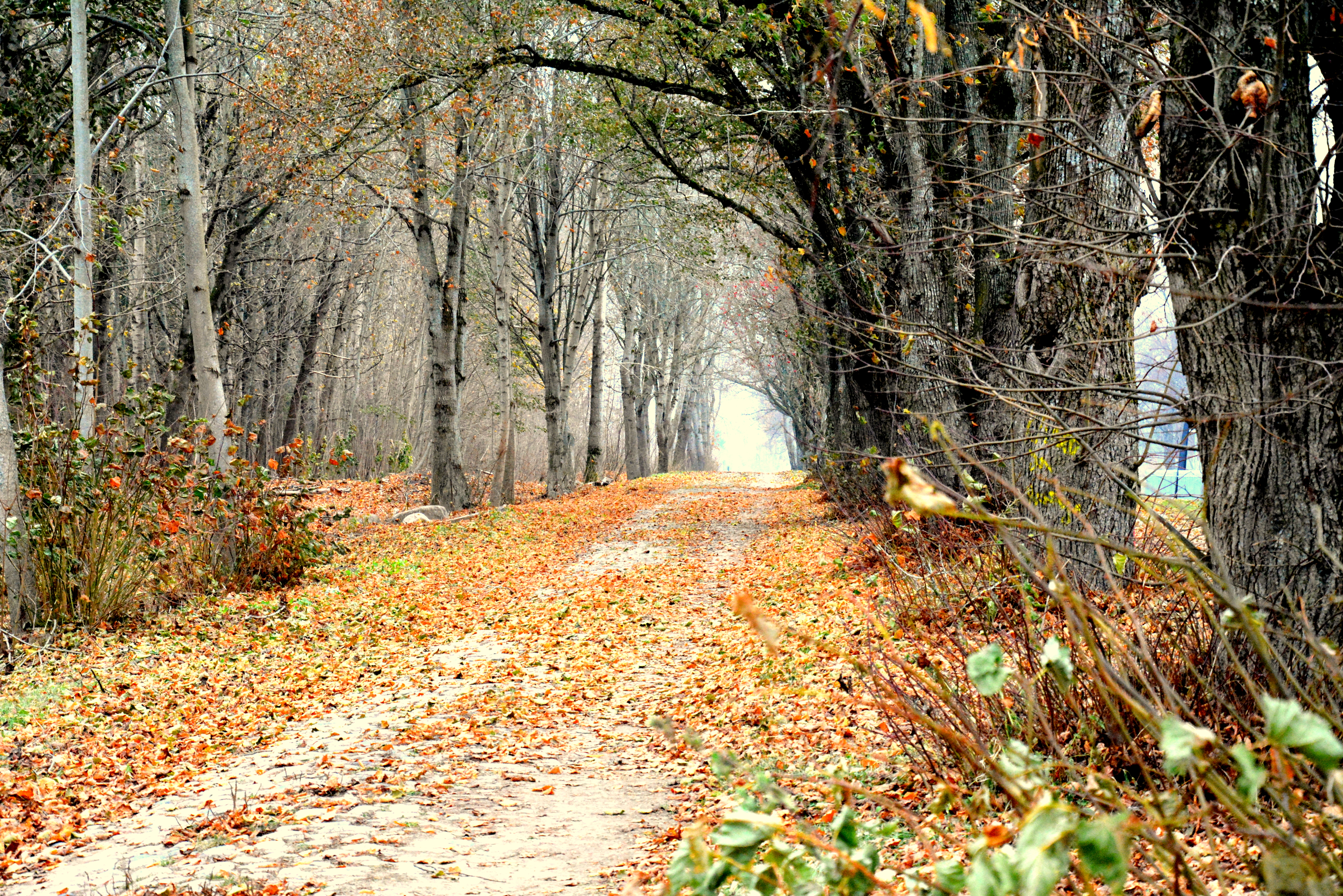
Kadrina railway station allee

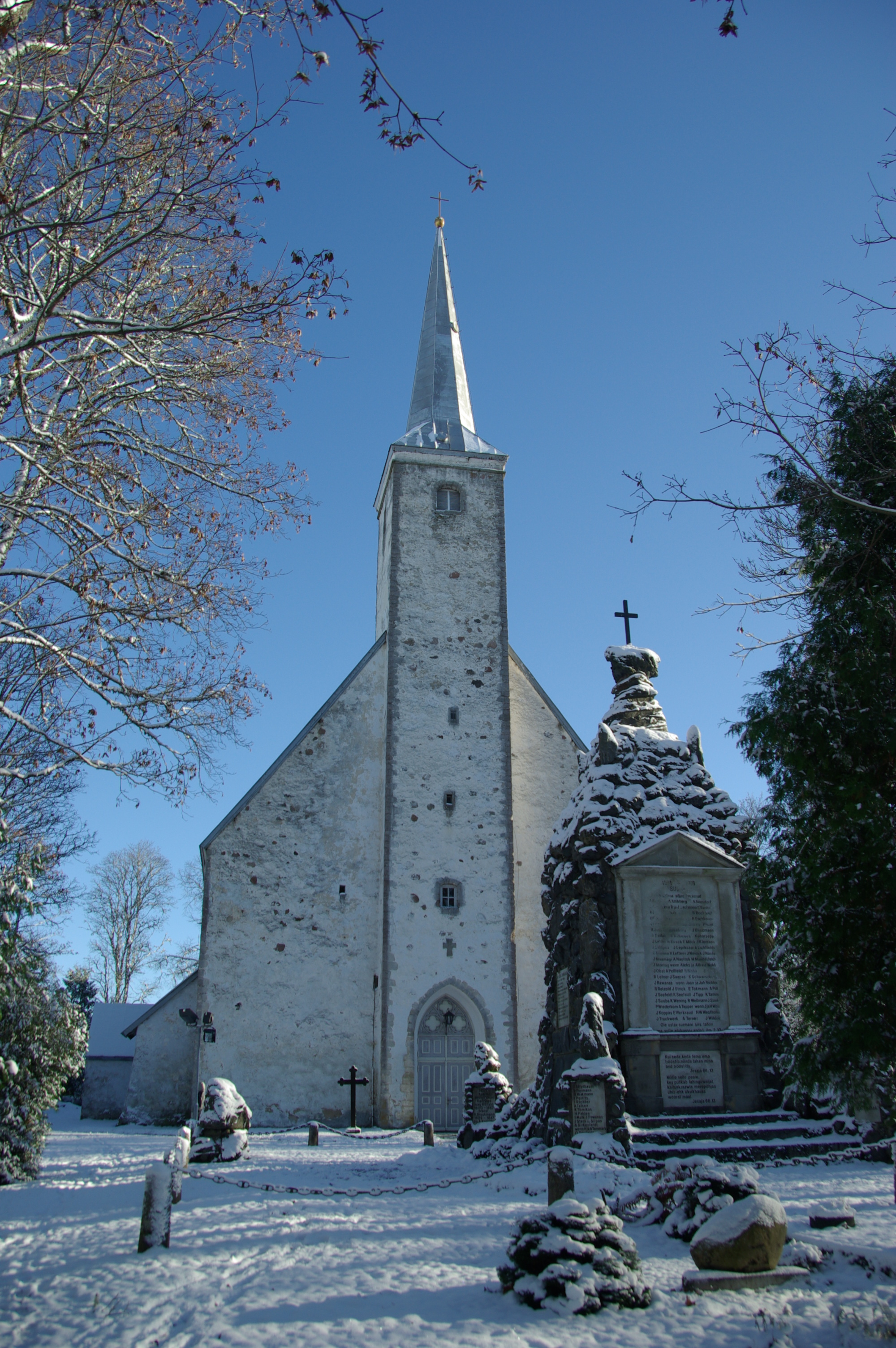
Kadrina church

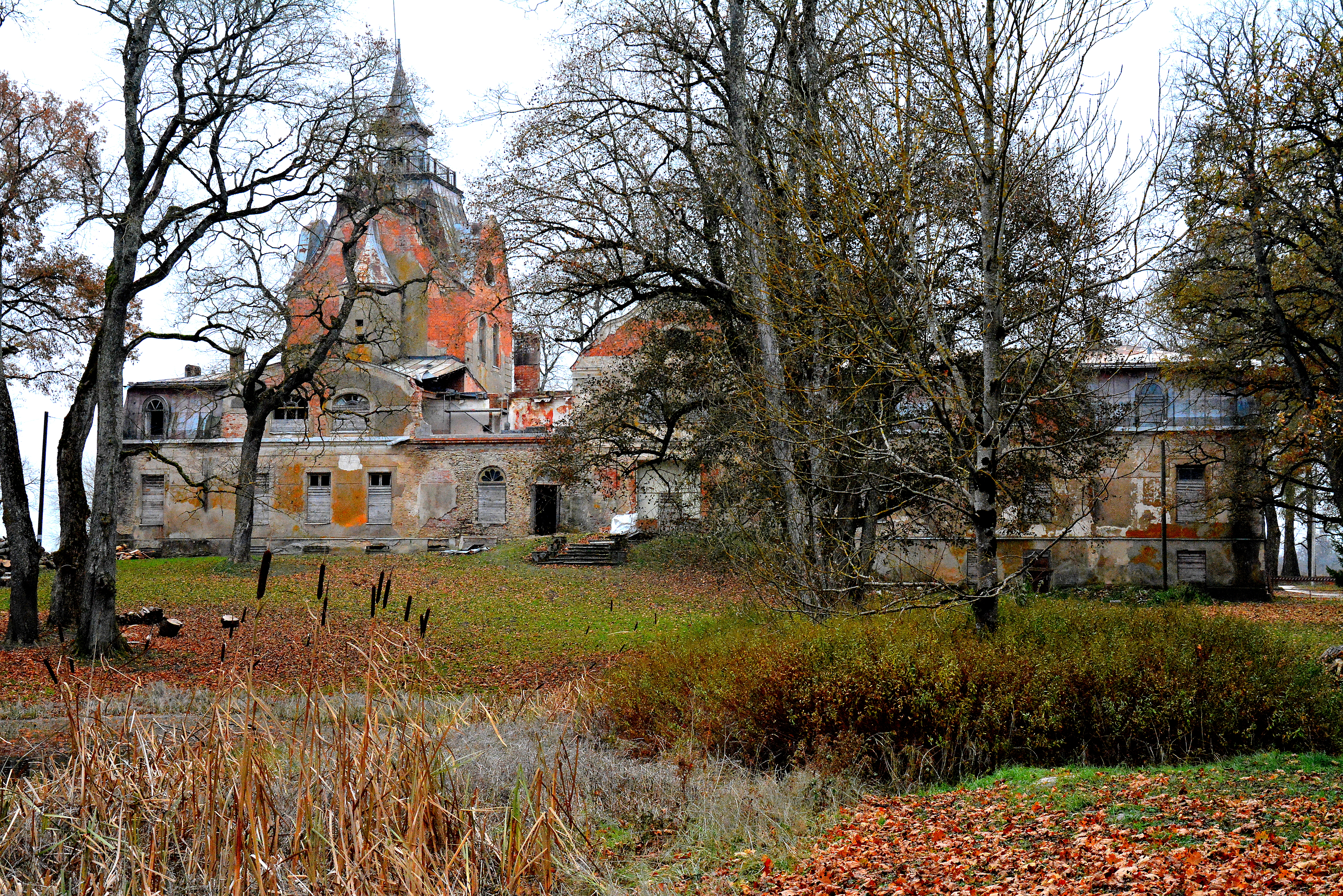
Neeruti manor

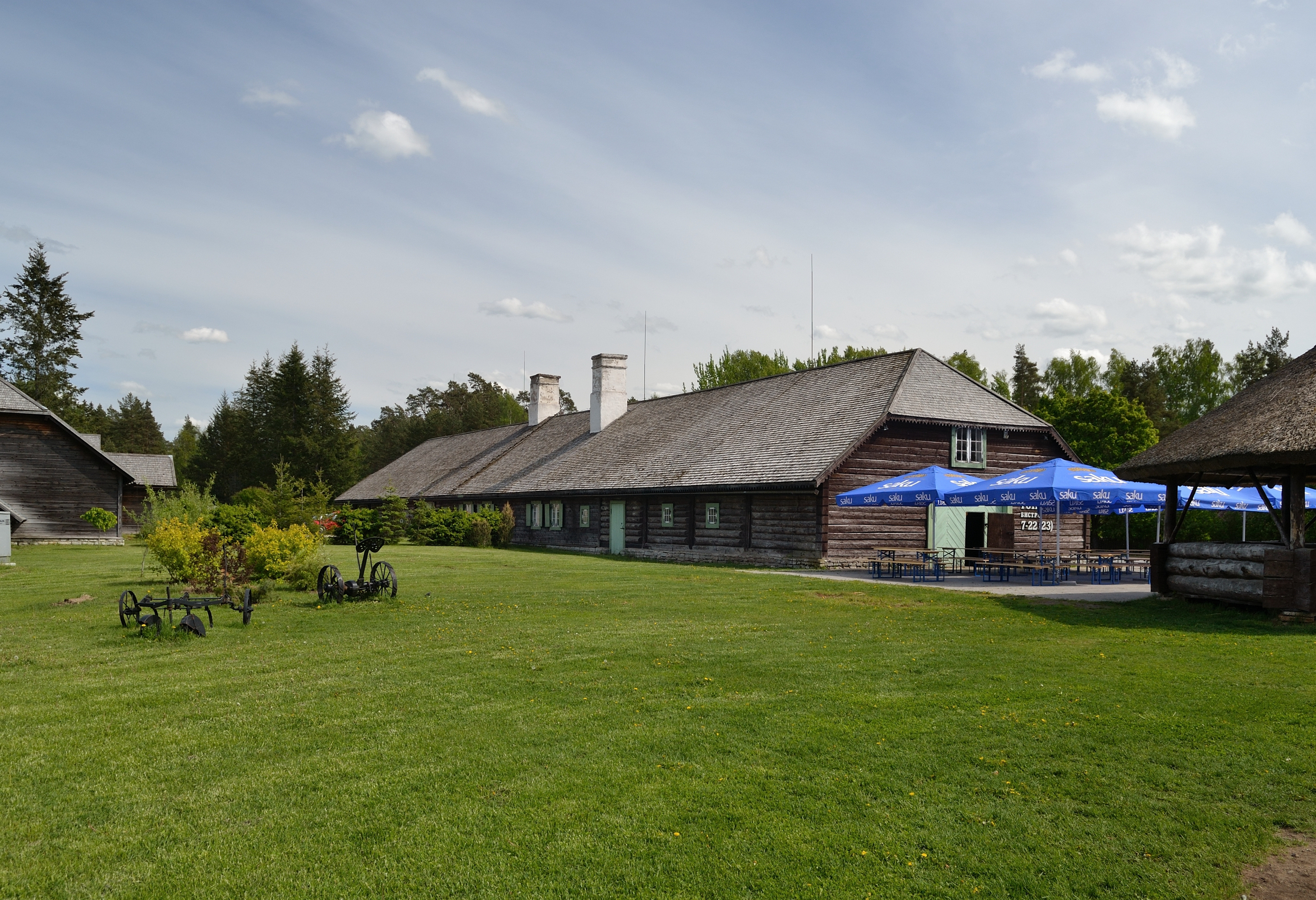
Viitna inn

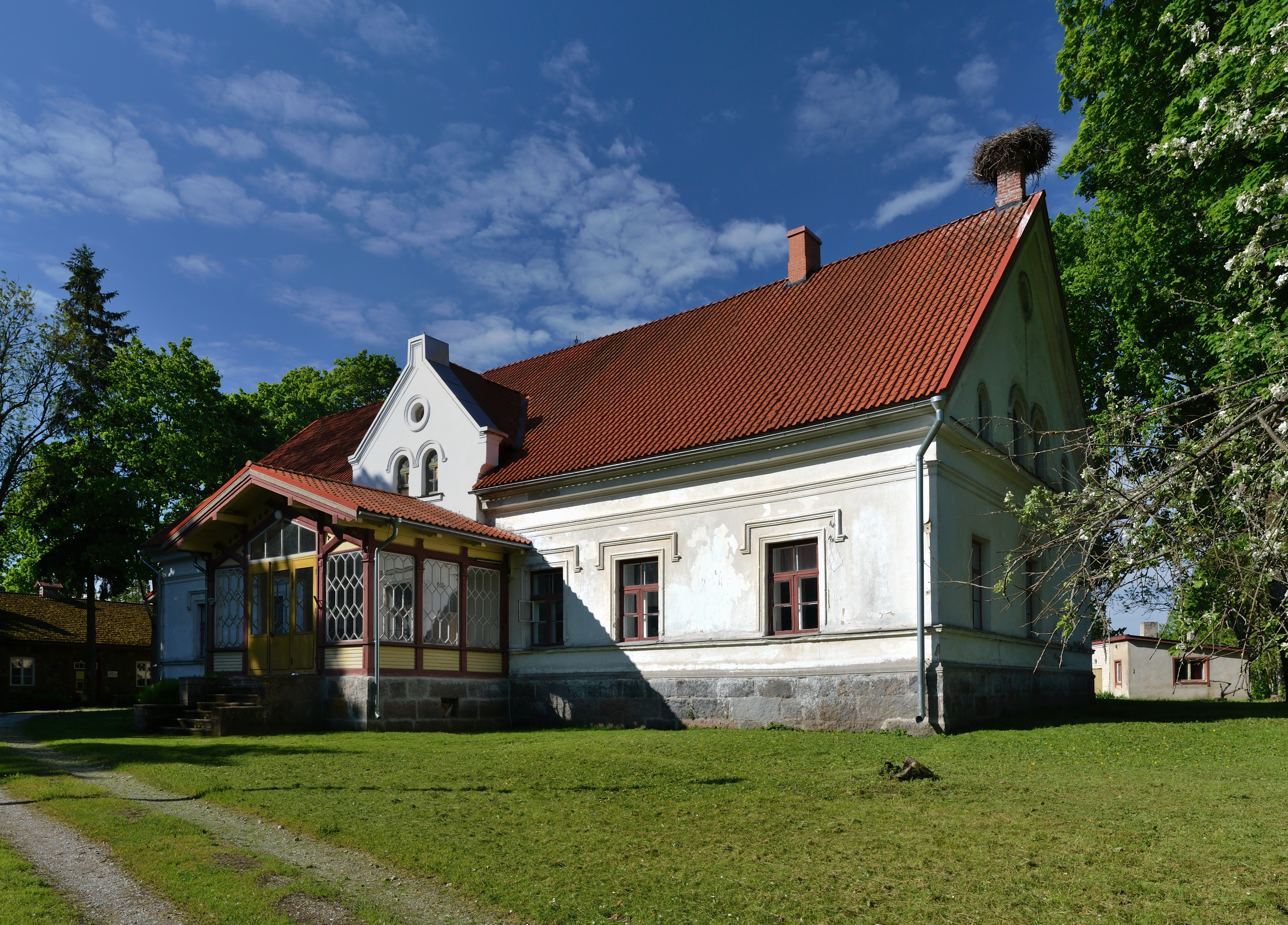
Undla manor house

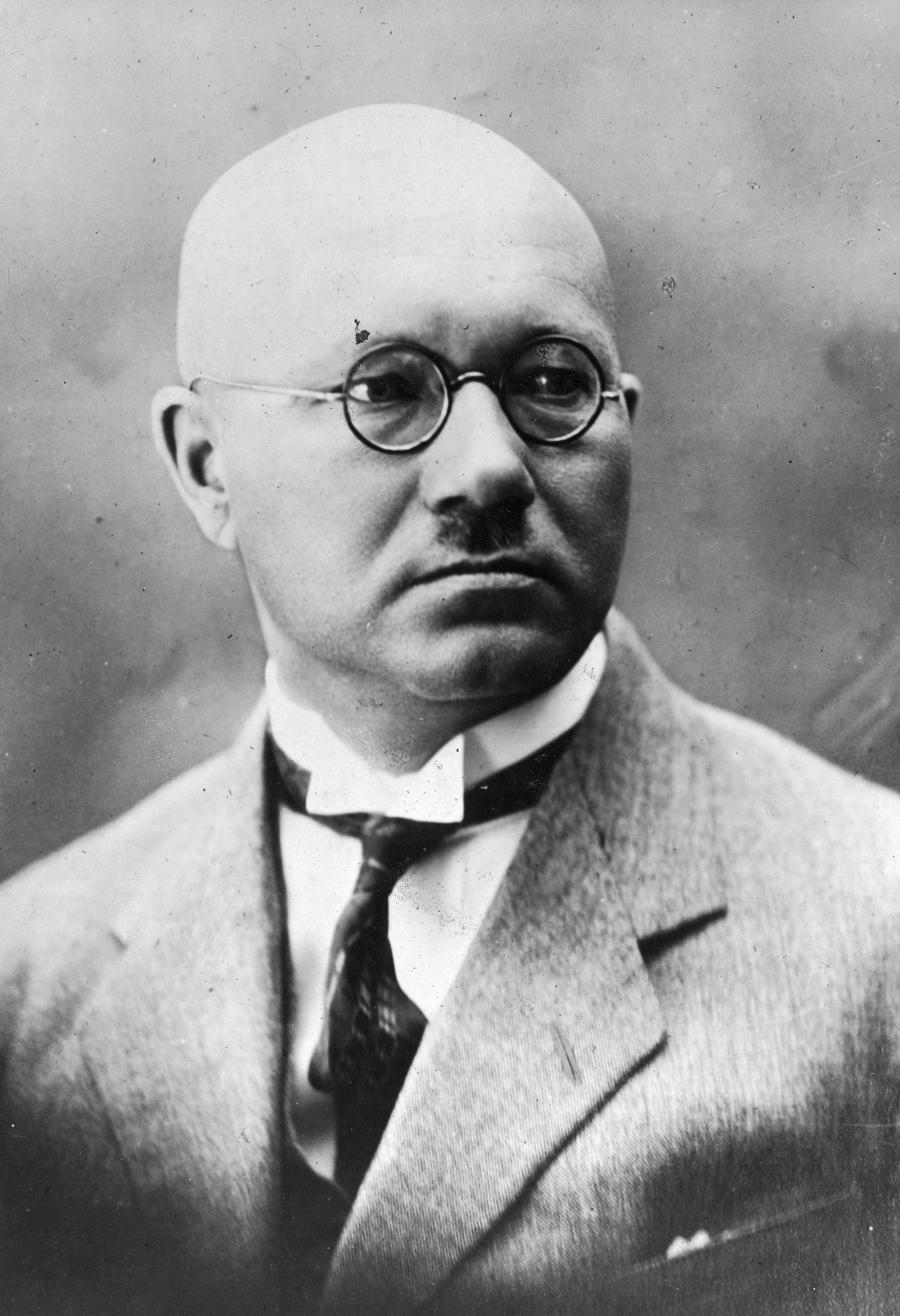
Otto Strandman, 1929

== Notable people ==
- Friedrich Reinhold Kreutzwald (1803 in Jõepere – 1882), writer, he wrote the national epic Kalevipoeg.
- Otto Strandman (1875 in Vandu – 1941), Estonian politician, Prime Minister, (1919) and State Elder, (1929–1931).
- Arnold Akberg (1894 in Võipere – 1984), painter. his paintings had a clear composition and delicate colours
- Arvo Kruusement (born 1928 in Undla), actor, theatre and film director, director of the Endla Theatre in Pärnu,
- Enn Tupp (born 1941 in Vohjna), politician, diplomat, biathlete, Defence Forces major and Minister of Defence, 1994 to 1995
