= Estonian national road 1 =

Road in Estonia

National Road 1
- Põhimaantee 1

Route information
- Length: 213 km (132 mi)

Major junctions
- From: Tallinn
- Ülemiste Väo; Maardu; Jägala; Liiapeksi; Loobu; Haljala; Põdruse; Sõmeru; Pada; Varja; Kohtla-Järve; Kohtla-Järve; Kukruse; Jõhvi; Jõhvi; Hiiemetsa Narva
- To: Narva border with Russia

Location
- Country: Estonia
- Counties: Harju County Lääne-Viru County Ida-Viru County

Highway system
- Transport in Estonia
| → T2 |

Tallinn-Narva maantee (Tallinn-Narva highway, alternatively Põhimaantee nr 1, unofficially abbreviated T1) is a 212-kilometre-long west-east national main road in Estonia. The road is part of the European route E20. The road forms a major transport west-south transport route between Russia and Europe. The highway starts in Tallinn and passes a number of major Estonian cities and towns, namely Rakvere, Kohtla-Järve, Jõhvi and Sillamäe. The highway ends in Narva on Friendship Bridge, with a border crossing to Russia over the Narva river.

The road has long been a historically vital link between West and East and has seen heightened attention throughout much of history. The road was considered especially important by Soviet leadership, with constant large-scale construction and improvement undertaken. Modernisation and widening has continued after re-independence. Full-length motorway status is a long-term goal of the state, alongside similar plans for Tallinn-Tartu and Tallinn-Pärnu.

In 2023, the highest traffic volumes were around Tallinn, with the AADT being around 31,000. These are among the highest figures in Estonia. The figures rise again around Jõhvi, hovering around 13,500.

The road is a dual carriageway for 86.6 kilometres. The main part is between Tallinn and Haljala (till km 89.9) being the longest in Estonia. The remainder can be found between Kohtla-Järve and Jõhvi (km 156.0-163.2). There are plans to expand the entire highway to dual carriageway by sometime after 2030. Currently, sections in cities are being made free-flowing, with two intersections in Sillamäe being made grade separated in 2016 and 2021. Also, U-turns on the road are being demolished to improve safety and upgrade the road standards.

== History ==
The earliest written records of a Tallinn-Narva road are from the early 17th century, when a Dutch delegation described their journey from Tallinn to Russia. The route taken was Tallinn–Valkla–Kolga–Toolse–Kudruküla–Narva, the trip took five days. Between Narva and Voka, the route matched the St. Petersburg-Riga post road. The 1780s saw the road rerouted southwards due to the hard-to-navigate Toila valley. The new junction for Tallinn-St. Petersburg and St. Petersburg-Riga postal roads became Jõhvi.

Until the 20th century the highway was a narrow and twisty track, but the advent of the automobile saw construction works on the more important sections of the highway, with gravel roads and permanent bridges built. The works were undertaken as imperial statute labour.

The independent Republic of Estonia was only able to repair select sections of the road, even though it was considered a first-class highway. The situation improved with a new highways law in 1929, with statute labour withdrawn and the maintenance of roads financed publicly. The 1930s saw the entrances to Tallinn, Kohtla-Järve and Narva receive hard surfacing. Just before the 1940 occupation a five-year plan to construct 20 and 70 kilometres of new highway in Harjumaa and Virumaa respectively was formalised, but was cancelled as war broke out. The highway received serious damage in the war.

Autumn 1944 saw intense repair works begin, which lasted two years. The importance of the highway was elevated, being a direct connection between a Soviet republic capital and the second most important town of the USSR, Leningrad. Large-scale construction works began in late 1945 or early 1946, with the main labour force being German POWs. Their main task was the construction of the road bed, largely carried out by hand. Concrete works were mechanised, with an US concreting machine driving on special steel rails. The repatriation of German POWs saw the labour switched to Russian prisoners, whose work on the highway ended in the late 1950s.

The German-built highway had a length of 28 kilometres, between km 22,8–49,8. The official cemetery to POWs who died working is in Kloostrimetsa. Over time the concrete was replaced with blacktop, with the final stretches of post-war concrete covered in the 1980s.

Vast asphaltisation of the road was undertaken in the 1940s/1950s, with the route being the first dust-free highway in the country by 1956. Temporary wooden bridges were replaced with steel-concrete. Focus on the road was intense despite the rest of the road network being in poor shape. The first asphalt concrete factory in the country was opened by the highway in Pahnimäe and the lion's share of its production went towards this highway. By the mid-1960s the road was, without doubt, the best maintained and most modern in Estonia.

In February 1964 construction works on the country's first dual carriageway began between Tallinn and Maardu, often mistakenly thought to be the section built by German POWs. The 7,1-kilometre stretch was finished in November 1967.

Widening of the road continued as the 1980 Moscow Olympics sailing event was held in Tallinn. The largest project was a 23,7 kilometre stretch of highway between Kuusalu and Valgejõe, with other sections also receiving work. Widening continued in the 1980s and a total of 24,3 kilometres of I class highway were added by the turn of the decade. Construction works ground to a halt following post-independence recession.

The second half of the 1990s saw construction restart. 113,7 kilometres of road were renovated in 2002, 2004 saw reconstruction between Maardu and Valgejõe for European standardisation. Renovation between Valgejõe and Rõmeda included resumption of the Viitna bypass, already started in the 1980s, and was completed in 2012.

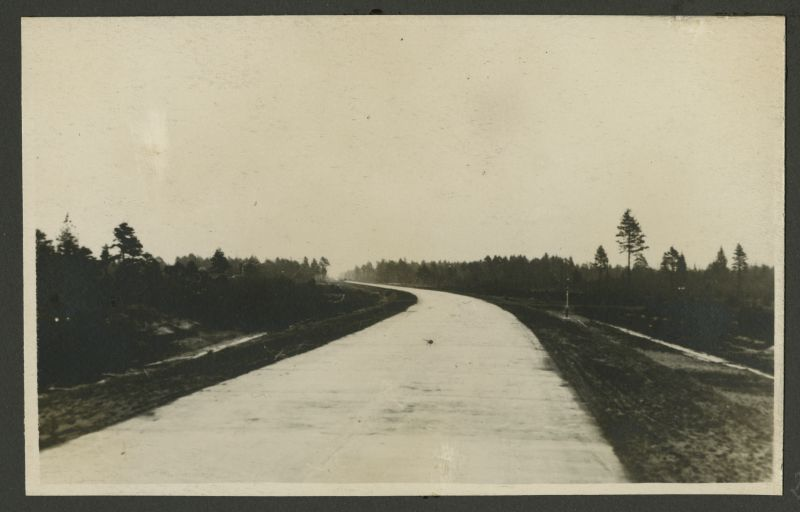
Tallinn-Leningrad highway, built by German POWs, in 1948

The largest and most expensive construction project in Estonian history, reconstruction of the Kukruse-Jõhvi section (one of the more dangerous sections on the highways network) was completed in 2010. The first six-lane section of motorway was constructed between Loo and Maardu in 2012, the same year saw an interchange built near Haljala.

An interchange in Sillamäe was built in 2017, streamlining the road and grade-separating the Sillamäe port railway crossing. The motorway was extended to the aforementioned Haljala interchange in 2020, making 80 kilometres of the highway continuously dual carriageway.

In 2022, a long-awaited interchange between the T1, T11 and Laagna tee was constructed in Väo.

== Route description ==
The T1 (Estonian: põhimaantee 1) is a major west–east highway in Estonia connecting the capital of the country, Tallinn, to the Virumaa region, where the highway follows a route parallel to the northern Estonian coast. The T1 is a part of the European route E20.

The route bypasses most cities, having urban sections only within the terminus cities Tallinn and Narva. The highway begins in Tallinn from Viru Square and runs through the city for 10 kilometres, following the city streets of Narva maantee, Pronksi, Tartu maantee and Peterburi tee. In the city, it intersects with the T2 in Ülemiste and the T11 near the city border, at Väo. After this, the Pirita river (and Tallinn city limits) are crossed. For some kilometres, the road has six lanes, the only such motorway of its kind in the country. An important interchange with the T94 directs cargo traffic to the port of Muuga. The road loses a lane here and continues into the countryside. Whilst the road is a dual carriageway, dangerous at-grade intersections are common until Loobu, a legacy of Soviet road design.

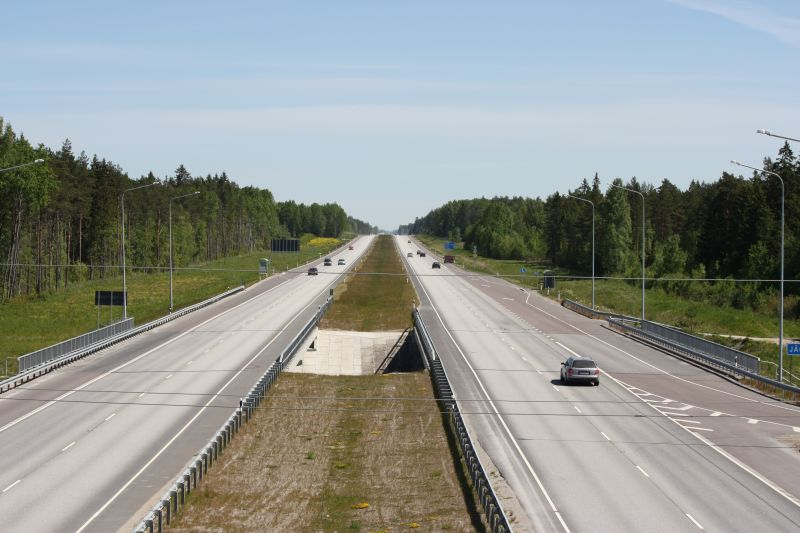
T1 near Jägala

The road turns into single carriageway after an interchange with the T23 near Haljala. Rakvere lies south of the highway, serviced by the aforementioned T23 and the T5, intersecting with the T1 by Sõmeru. The highway, now narrower and twistier, also passes through or near smaller settlements, often with lowered speed limits. The highway comes closest to the Baltic Sea in Kõrkküla, being visible from the road. A fresh stretch of dual carriageway services Kohtla-Järve and Jõhvi, with three interchanges, one of them with the T3/E264. Having bypassed both towns, the road is again single carriageway until Narva. Newly built interchanges take the road into a trench in the major port town of Sillamäe, although at-grade intersections with city streets also persist. Finally, the road reaches Narva and follows the path of Tallinna maantee. Going straight through the center of the town, the highway reaches the border crossings and crosses the Narva river into Russia.

=== Road length of lane ===
| 10 km | 4 km | 76 km | 67 km | 7 km | 46 km | 3 km |
| Urban | 3+3 road | 2+2 road | 1+1 road | 2+2 road | 1+1 road | Urban |

=== Traffic regulations ===
Currently there are 11 speed cameras on the T1, between kilometres 127 and 202.

Whilst the road has long stretches of dual-carriageway, none of it is restricted-access. They do, however, have summer-time elevated speed limits of 110km/h. The lowest bridges on the highway are in Kukruse and Sillamäe, with a 4,8-metre height restriction.

== Route table ==
The route passes through Harju County (Tallinn, Jõelähtme, Maardu, Kuusalu), Lääne-Viru County (Kadrina, Haljala, Rakvere, Viru-Nigula) and Ida-Viru County (Lüganuse, Toila, Jõhvi, Sillamäe, Narva-Jõesuu, Narva).

| Municipality | Location | km | mi | Destinations | Notes |
|---|---|---|---|---|---|
| Tallinn | Viru väljak | 0.0 | 0.0 | | Viru Square is the starting point for four highways - Tallinn-Narva, Tallinn-Tartu, Tallinn-Pärnu and Tallinn-Paldiski. Concurrency with T2. |
| Tallinn | Pronksi | | | Estonian national road 11608 | Urban intersection |
| Tallinn | Ülemiste | | | – Tartu; Tallinn Airport | Peterburi tee crosses on flyover; end of T2 concurrency. |
| Tallinn | Väo | | | – Tartu, Pärnu, Paldiski | |
Exiting Tallinn, start of dual carriageway
| Jõelähtme | Loo | | | – Loo; – Liivamäe; – Vana-Narva highway | |
| Maardu | Maardu | | | – Muuga, Maardu; – Maardu village | |
| Jõelähtme | Loovälja | | | – Maardu village, Kallavere waste processing facility; – Kostivere | |
| Jõelähtme | Võerdla | | | – Rebala, Võerdla | At-grade intersection; left-hand northbound turn |
| Jõelähtme | Jõelähtme | | | – Kostivere, Parasmäe; – Koogi, Jõelähtme centre | At-grade; all-directions access via U-turns |
| Jõelähtme | Jägala | | | – Käravete, Aegviidu; – Kaberneeme, Valkla | |
| Kuusalu | Kodasoo | | | – Kaberla, Kodasoo centre; Saunja | |
| Kuusalu | Kiiu | | | – Soodla | |
| Kuusalu | Kuusalu | | | – Kuusalu centre | |
| Kuusalu | Kahala | | | – Kursi | |
| Kuusalu | Vahastu | | | – Hirvli, Sigula; – Mustametsa | At-grade; all-directions access via U-turns |
| Kuusalu | Liiapeksi | | | – Loksa, Kolga | At-grade; all-directions access via U-turns |
| Kuusalu | Kemba | | | – Kõnnu | At-grade; all-directions access via U-turns |
| Kuusalu | Valgejõe | | | – Valgejõe centre | At-grade intersection; left-hand northbound turn; missing eastbound connection; |
| Kuusalu | Valgejõe | | | – Valgejõe centre | At-grade; eastbound access via U-turn; missing northbound connection |
| Kadrina | Loobu | | | – Tapa | |
| Kadrina | Loobu | | | – Kadrina, Viitna | Eastbound exit only |
| Kadrina | Viitna | | | – Kadrina, Viitna centre, Võsu, Palmse | |
| Kadrina | Viitna | | | – Rõmeda centre; – Liiguste centre | At-grade; north-to-east access via U-turn; south-to-west connection missing; |
| Haljala | Aaspere | | | – Kihlevere, Võipere, Vanamõisa, Aaspere | |
| Haljala | Haljala | | | Veltsi; – Rakvere; – Võsu, Haljala | |
End of dual carriageway
| Haljala | Põdruse | | | – Kunda | |
| Rakvere | Arkna | | | – Rakvere | |
| Rakvere | Sõmeru | | | – Pärnu, Rakvere | |
| Rakvere | Sõmeru | | | – Ubja | |
| Rakvere | Sõmeru | | | – Mõedaka, Vaeküla | |
| Rakvere | Sämi | | | – Uhtna | |
| Rakvere | Sämi | | | – Kiviõli, Sonda | |
| Viru-Nigula | Pada | | | – Kunda, Viru-Nigula | |
| Viru-Nigula | Pada | | | – Sonda | |
| Viru-Nigula | Koogu | | | – Kalvi | |
| Viru-Nigula | Rannu | | | – Aseri | |
| Viru-Nigula | Kõrkküla | | | – Kestla | |
| Lüganuse | Kõrkküla | | | – Liimala | |
| Lüganuse | Purtse | | | – Püssi, Lüganuse | |
| Lüganuse | Purtse | | | – Liimala | |
| Lüganuse | Hiie | | | – Purtse centre | |
| Lüganuse | Purtse | | | – Lüganuse cemetery road | |
| Lüganuse | Varja | | | – Kiviõli, Püssi | |
| Lüganuse | Soodumäe | | | Estonian national road 13191 | |
| Lüganuse | Varja | | | – Moldova | |
| Lüganuse | Varja | | | Estonian national road 13193 | |
| Lüganuse | Voorepera | | | Estonian national road 13121 | |
| Lüganuse | Aa | | | – Aa manor | |
| Lüganuse | Aa | | | – Aa | |
| Toila | Saka | | | – Saka | |
| Toila | Kohtla-Järve | | | – Kohtla-Nõmme, Kohtla-Järve | |
| Toila | Järve | | | – Ontika | |
| Toila | Järveküla | | | Järve village; – Amula | |
Start of dual carriageway
| Toila | Järveküla | | | – Kohtla-Järve | North-to-west ramp missing |
| Toila | Täkumetsa | | | – Tammiku, Kohtla-Järve, Kukruse | |
| Jõhvi | Edise | | | – Tartu, Jõhvi | |
End of dual carriageway
| Jõhvi | Jõhvi | | | – Uikala | |
| Toila | Kõrve | | | – Toila | |
| Toila | Lagedi | | | – Pühajõe centre, Voka village centre | |
| Toila | Lagedi | | | – Oru | |
| Toila | Oru | | | – Voka | |
| Toila | Oru | | | – Voka borough | |
| Toila | Konju | | | – Voka borough | |
| Sillamäe | Sillamäe | | | – Vaivara, Sillamäe port, Tööstuse street; L. Tolstoi street | Single carriageway, grade-separated junction |
| Sillamäe | Sillamäe | | | – Viivikonna, Vaivara; City centre | Single carriageway, grade-separated junction |
| Narva-Jõesuu | Sillamäe | | | – Sinimäe | |
| Narva-Jõesuu | Sinimäe | | | – Sinimäe centre | |
| Narva-Jõesuu | Hiiemetsa | | | – Narva-Jõesuu | |
| Narva-Jõesuu | Hiiemetsa | | | – Auvere | |
| Narva-Jõesuu | Vodava | | | – Meriküla | |
| Narva-Jõesuu | Peeterristi | | | – Kudruküla | |
| Narva-Jõesuu | Lapiotsa | | | – Soldina | |
| Narva-Jõesuu | Narva | | | – Arumäe | |
Entering Narva
| Narva | Narva | | | Estonian national road 13109 | |
| Narva | Kerese | | | – Narva-Jõesuu | |
Narva-1 border crossing with Russia
1.000 mi = 1.609 km; 1.000 km = 0.621 mi: Concurrency terminus; Incomplete access

== See also ==
- European route E20
