= Ridaküla =

Ridaküla may refer to several places in Estonia:

- Ridaküla, Lääne-Viru County, village in Kadrina Parish, Lääne-Viru County
- Ridaküla, Tartu County, village in Elva Parish, Tartu County
- Ridaküla, Rapla County, village in Rapla Parish, Rapla County
- Ridaküla, Viljandi County, village in Viljandi Parish, Viljandi County
