= Püssi =

Town in northeastern Estonia

- Town
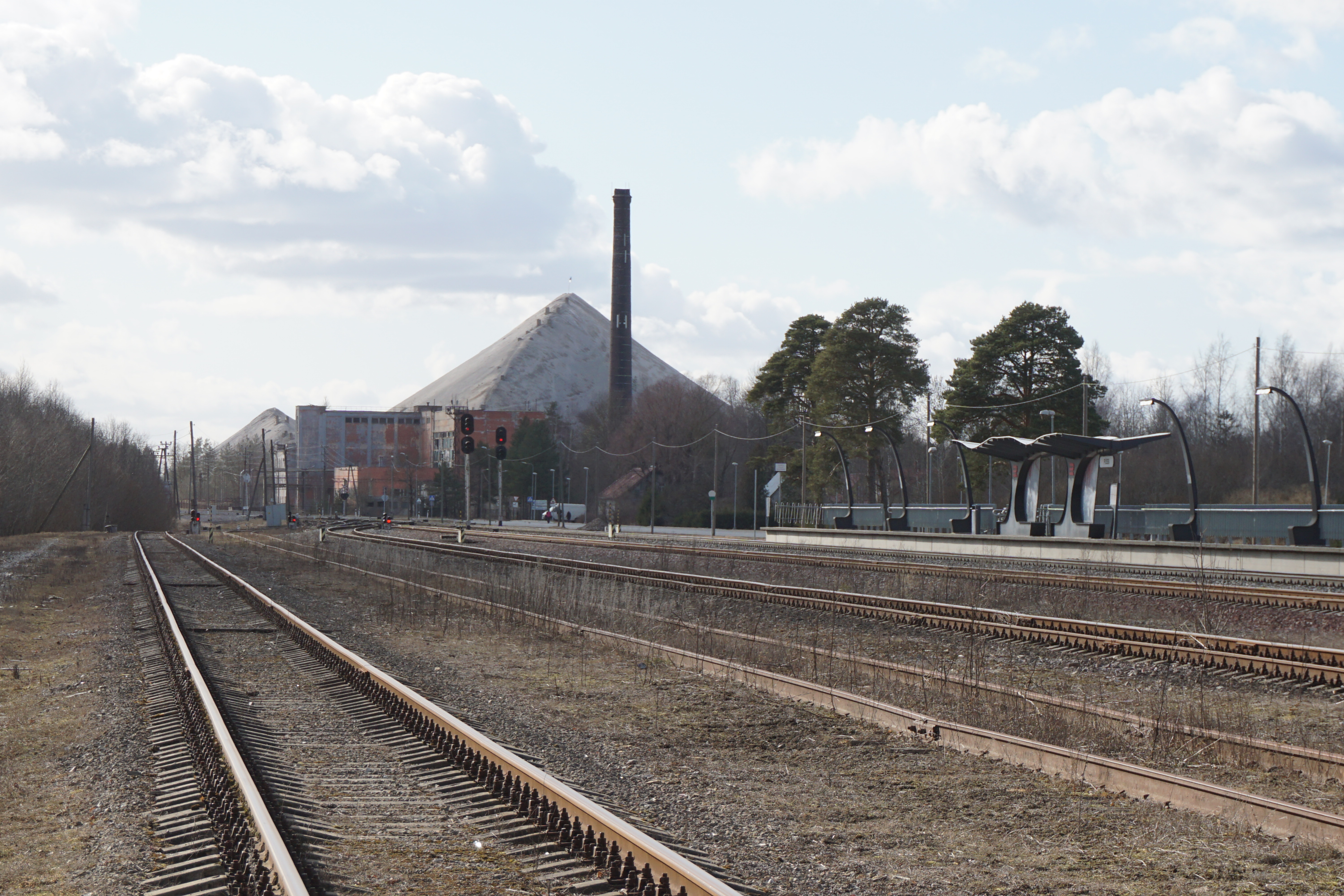
- Püssi railway station

- Location in Estonia
- Coordinates: 59°22′N 27°03′E
- Country: Estonia
- County: Ida-Viru County
- Municipality: Lüganuse Parish
- First mentioned: 1472
- Borough rights: 1954
- Town rights: 1993

Population (2026)
  - Total: 852
- Time zone: UTC+2 (EET)
  - Summer (DST): UTC+3 (EEST)

Püssi (/ˈpʊsi/ PUUS-ee; Estonian: [ˈpysʲːi]; German: Neu-Isenhof) is an industrial town in Lüganuse Parish, Ida-Viru County, Estonia, with a population of 917 as of 2018. It is located near the road between Tallinn and St. Petersburg and borders Lüganuse to the north. Püssi is located 4.5 kilometers from Kiviõli and 19 kilometers from Kohtla-Järve.

== History ==
Following the end of the Soviet Union, Püssi saw a sharp economic downturn and a population exodus. In 1989, the population of Püssi stood at 2,400 people, and 20 years later, in 2009, was only 1,809. The population has continued to decrease and by 2012 stood at 1,783 people. In October 2013, Püssi along with Maidla Parish were merged into Lüganuse Parish, and therefore ceased to exist as separate municipalities.

== Economy ==
By 2002 Püssi had accumulated 20 million kroons of debt, the equivalent to 1.3 million euros; and property values had become so low that apartments were valued around zero. Since then, the city's economy has begun to recover. Püssi has planned the construction of an industrial park. The Chairman of the town council, in an interview with The Baltic Times, marketed Püssi by stating that property values in the city were only 1% of those of the capital city of Tallinn.

Püssi has historically served as a production center for particle board. At the time of the collapse of the Soviet Union, the town's largest employer was particle board manufacturer Repo Vabrikud, which employed 1,400 people, over half the city. Although Repo Vabrikud has scaled back employment significantly, other particle board manufacturers have moved in. Sorbes Group has the production center for its "Repo by Sorbes" line of particle board in Püssi. In 2011, the Estonian furniture manufacturer Viisnurk took over an inactive softboard factor in the city with the intention to manufacture softboard for international clients in Asia and Europe.

In December 2010, Siemens announced that Püssi had been selected as the location of one of two converter stations for their "EstLink 2" high voltage power line between Estonia and Finland.

== Culture ==
Püssi is the home of the Püssi Punk Festival, which has run annually since 2005, and features rock, metal, blues, and indie musicians from several countries.

The town contains an artificial mountain made of ash from an oil shale power plant that has been depositing ash in the location since the 1930s. The mountain is used for motocross racing.

== Notable people ==
- Carl Timoleon von Neff (1804–1877), Russian Baltic German artist, several works hang in the Art Museum of Estonia
- Herbert Brede (1888–1942), army general.
- Piret Hartman (born 1981), politician, serves at Ministry of Regional Affairs and Agriculture

== Gallery ==
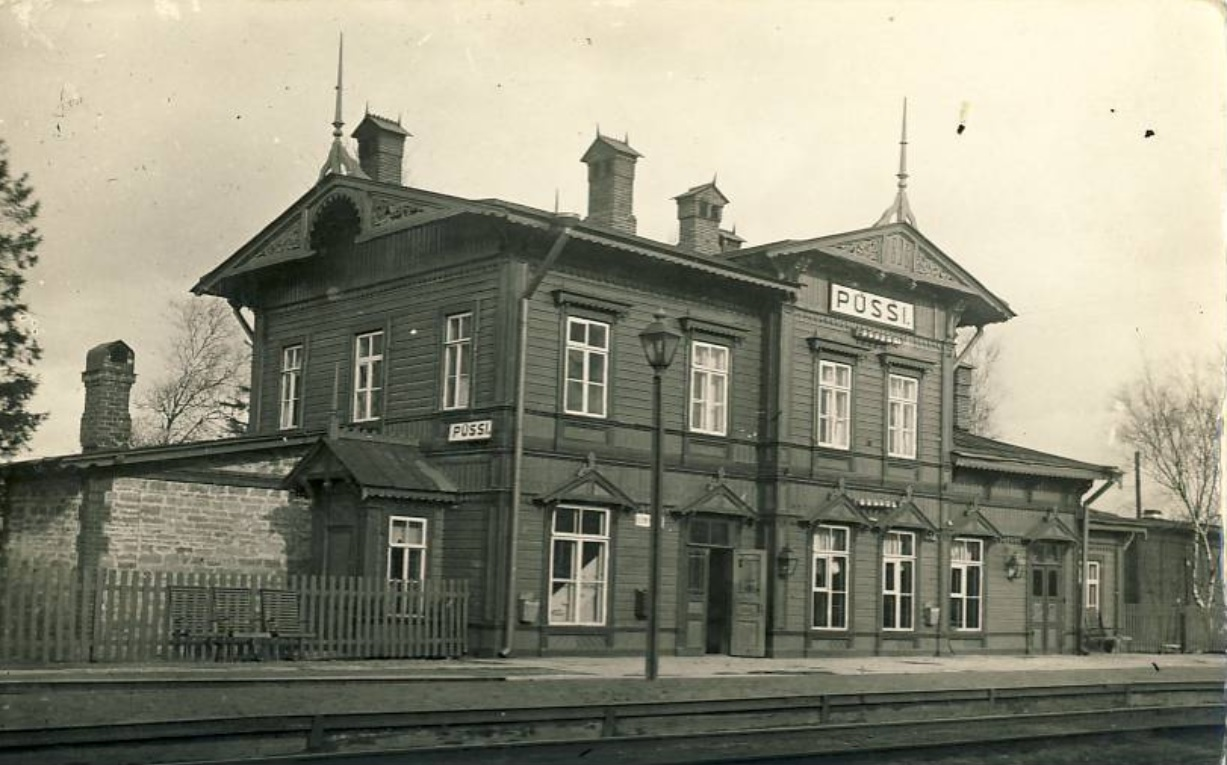
The old Püssi railway station (destroyed in World War II)

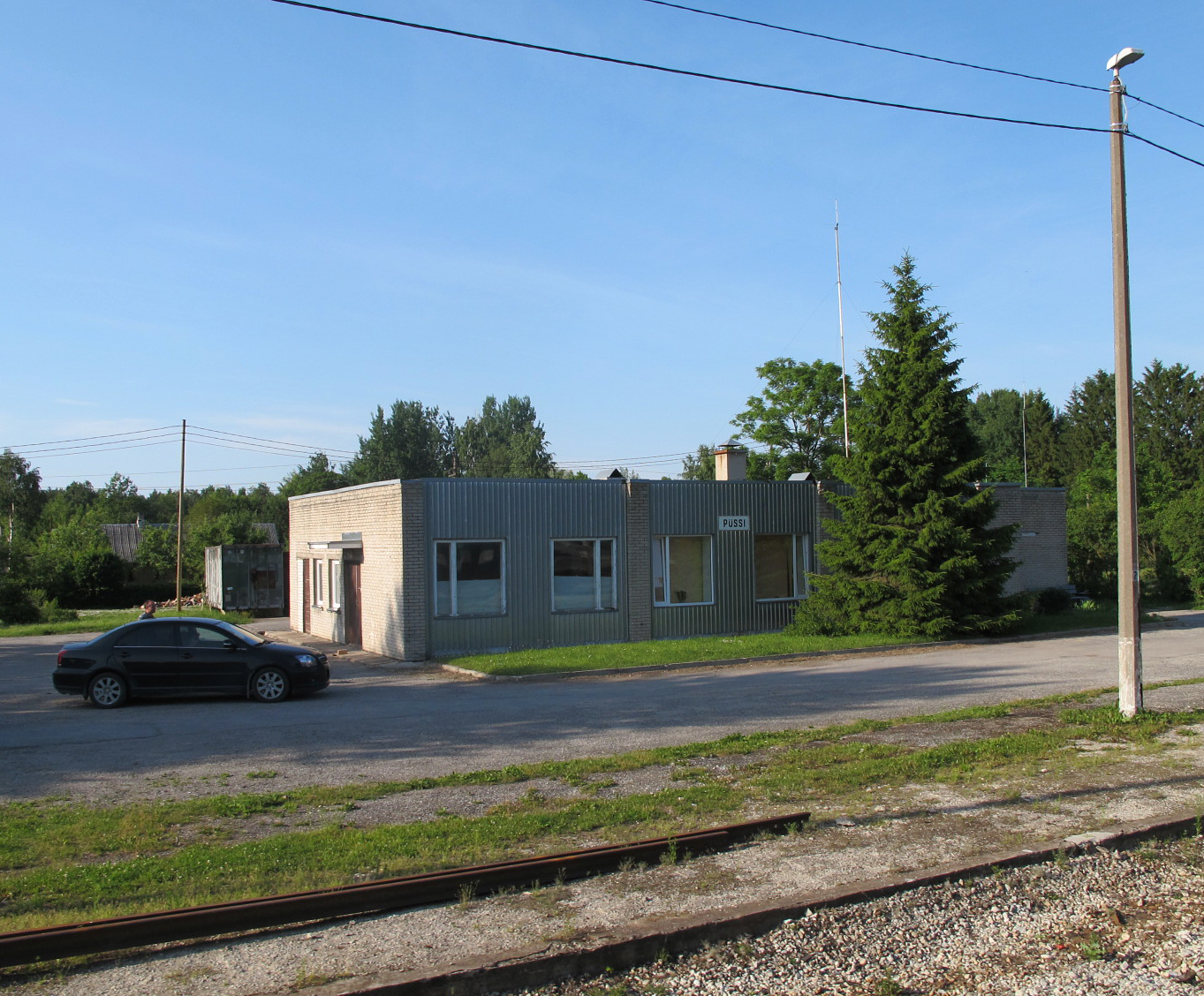
Püssi train station

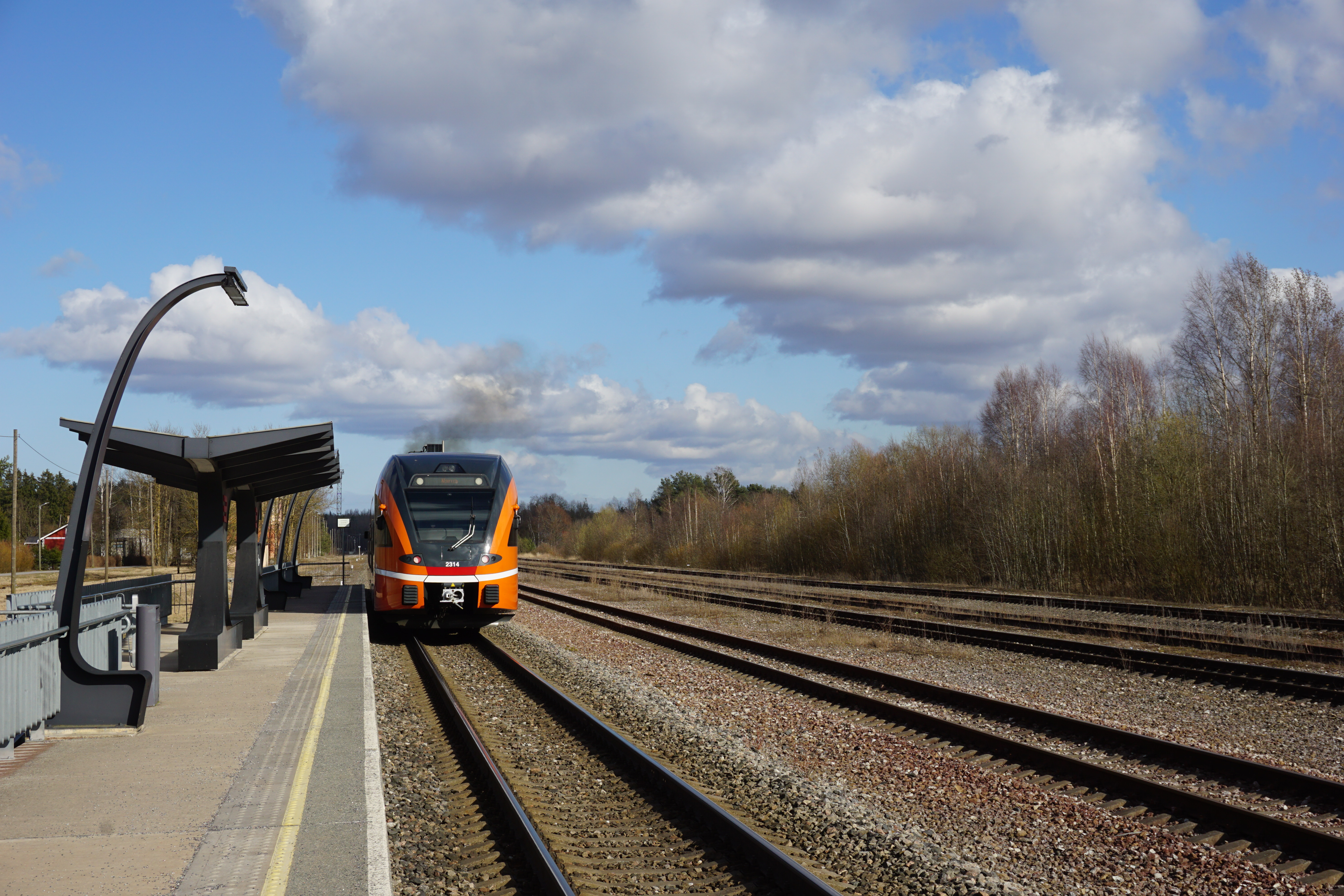
Elron passenger train in Püssi

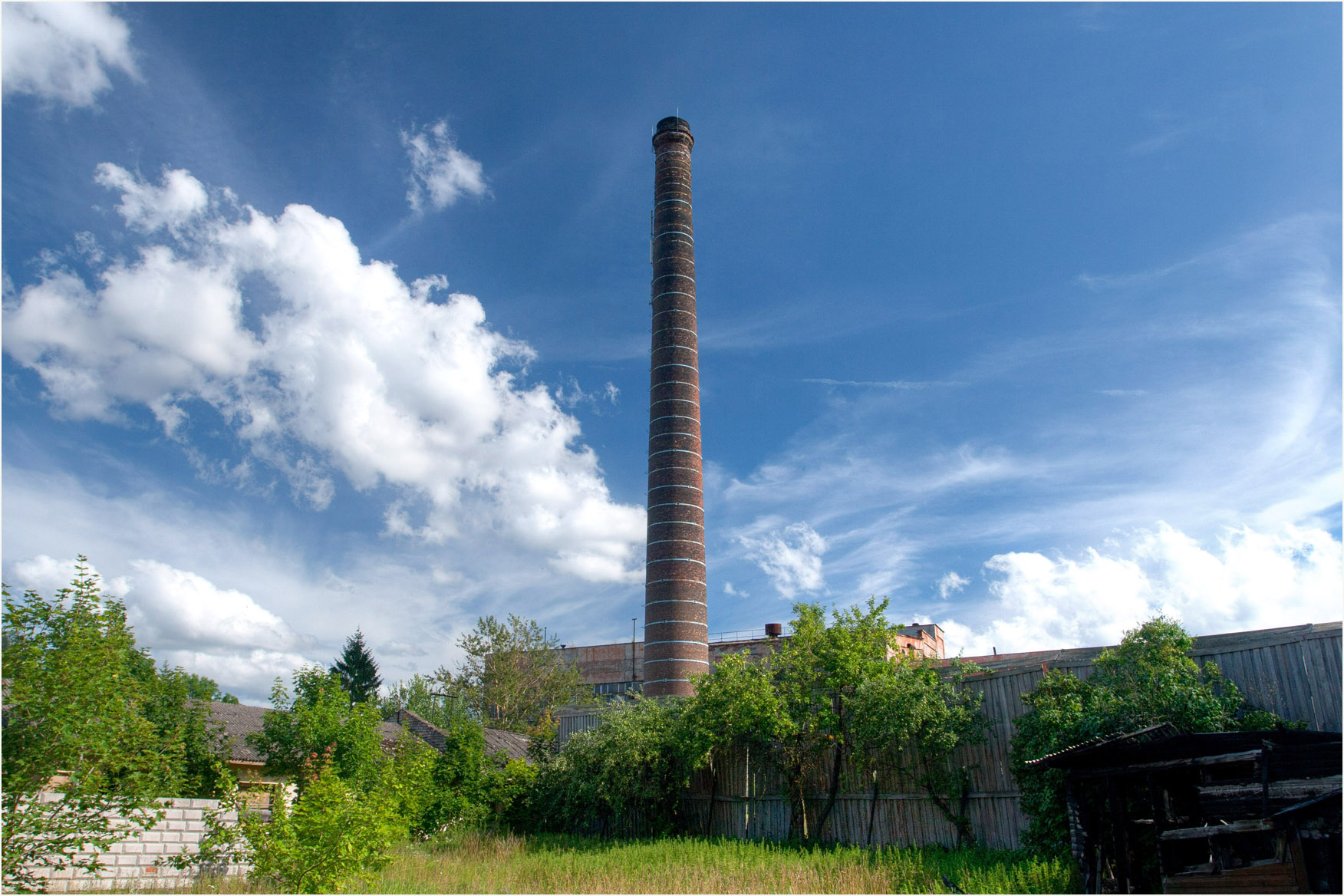
Old factory's chimney (July 2011)

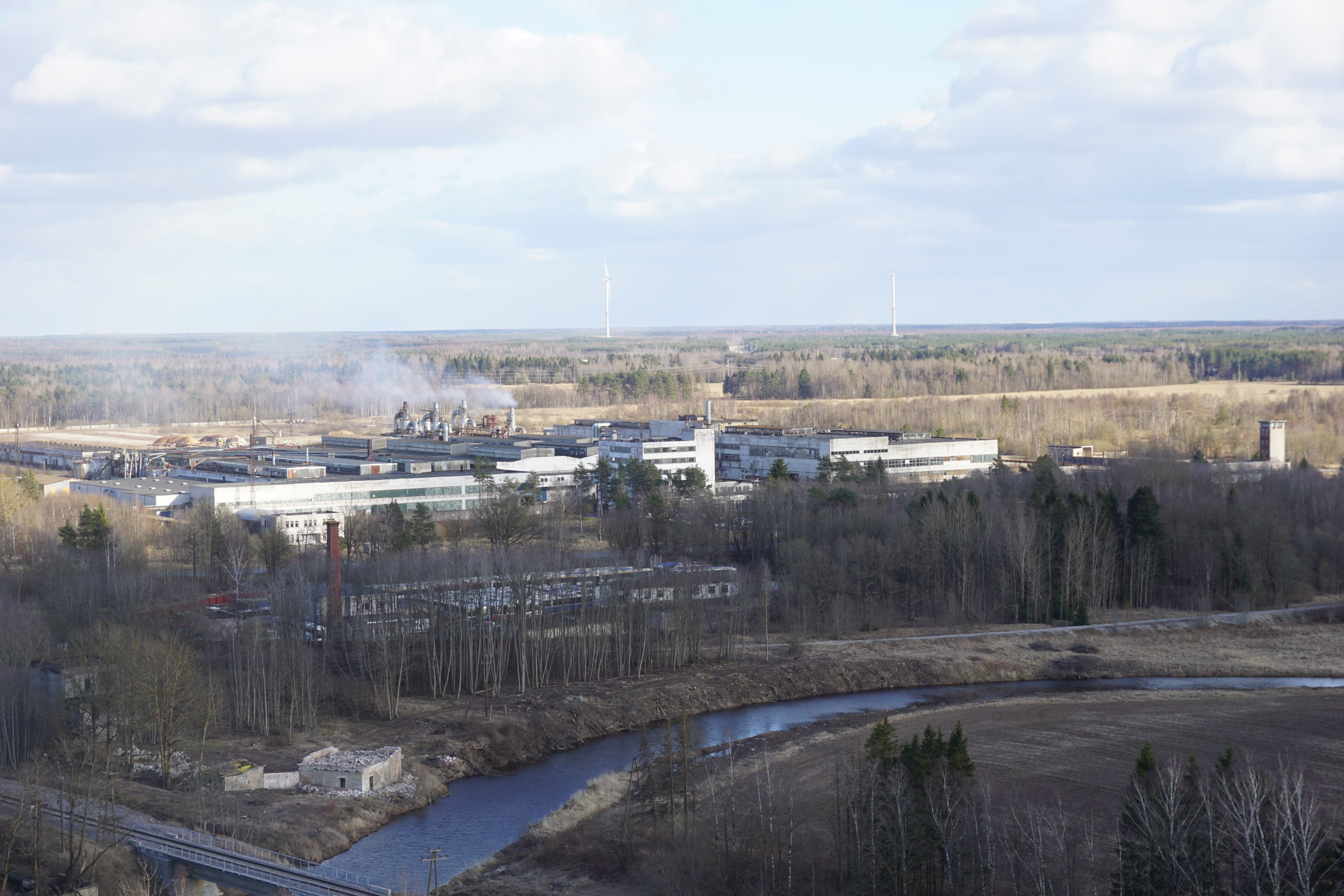
Püssi AS Repo factory next to the Purtse river

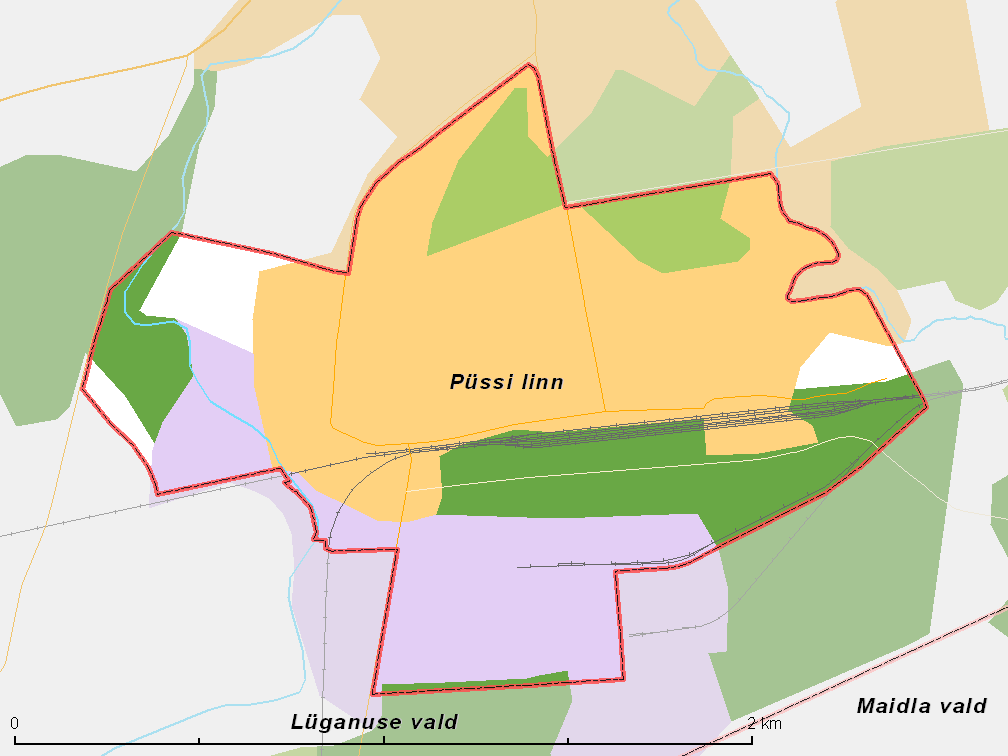
