= Mustametsa =

Mustametsa may refer to several places in Estonia:

- Mustametsa, Harju County, village in Kuusalu Parish, Harju County
- Mustametsa, Tartu County, village in Peipsiääre Parish, Tartu County
