= Ridaküla, Lääne-Viru County =

Village in Estonia

Coordinates: 59°18′47″N 25°59′50″E

Ridaküla
- Village
- Interactive map of Ridaküla
- Country: Estonia
- County: Lääne-Viru County
- Parish: Kadrina Parish
- Time zone: UTC+2 (EET)
  - Summer (DST): UTC+3 (EEST)

Ridaküla is a village in Kadrina Parish, Lääne-Viru County, in northern Estonia. It is located on the Tapa–Loobu road (nr. 24), about 5 km (3 mi) northeast of the town of Tapa. Ridaküla is bordered by the Tallinn–Tapa–Narva railway to the southeast and the Valgejõgi River to the southwest.

== Heritage Sites Nearby ==
If you ever visit Ridaküla remember to stop by Unesco world heritage sites nearby. The nearest heritage site is Struve Geodetic Arc in Belarus at a distance of 21 mi (or 34 km). Tapa, Kadrina, Ambla, Tamsalu and Vosu are the other places you would want to visit.
