= Aa, Estonia =

Village in Estonia

Aa
- Village
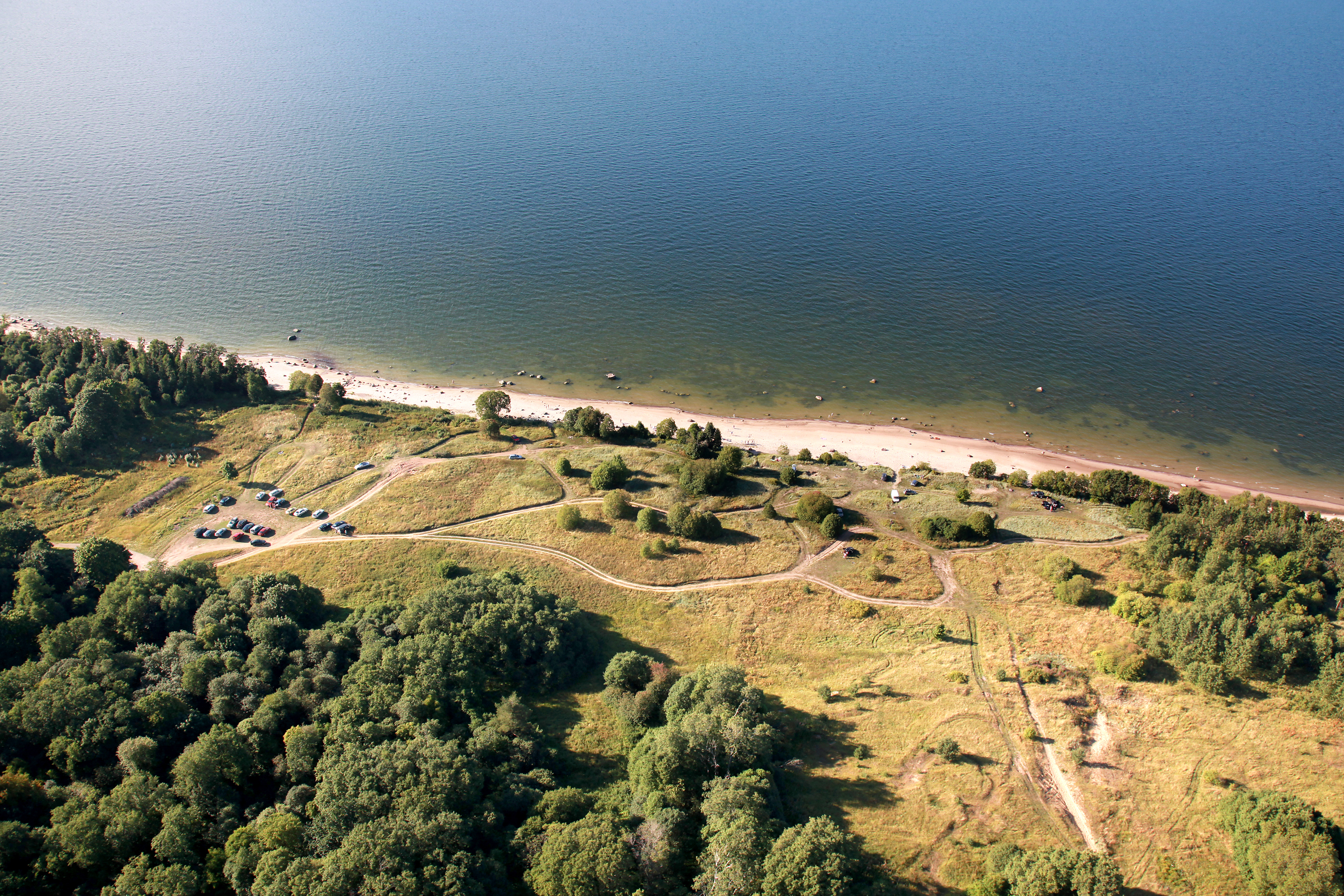
- Aa beach

- Location in Estonia
- Coordinates: 59°25′25″N 27°09′09″E
- Country: Estonia
- County: Ida-Viru County
- Municipality: Lüganuse Parish
- First mentioned: 1241

Population (2019)
  - Total: 89

Aa is a village in northern Estonia, on the southern coast of the Gulf of Finland in the eastern part of the Lüganuse Parish of Ida-Viru County, 10 km (6.2 mi) from Lüganuse. Part of the village, including the Aa manor house, is situated on the North Estonian limestone bank.

According to the 2000 census, the population of Aa was 190. According to the 1967 census, the population of the village of Aa along with the settlement of Aa (Aa asundus) was 267.

== History ==
The first written record of Aa dates back to a 1241 Danish census (Liber Census Daniae) where its name was listed as Hazæ. Later it was known also by its German name Haakhof. The village was located on the territory of the historical Lüganuse Parish of the county of Virumaa.

== Sights ==
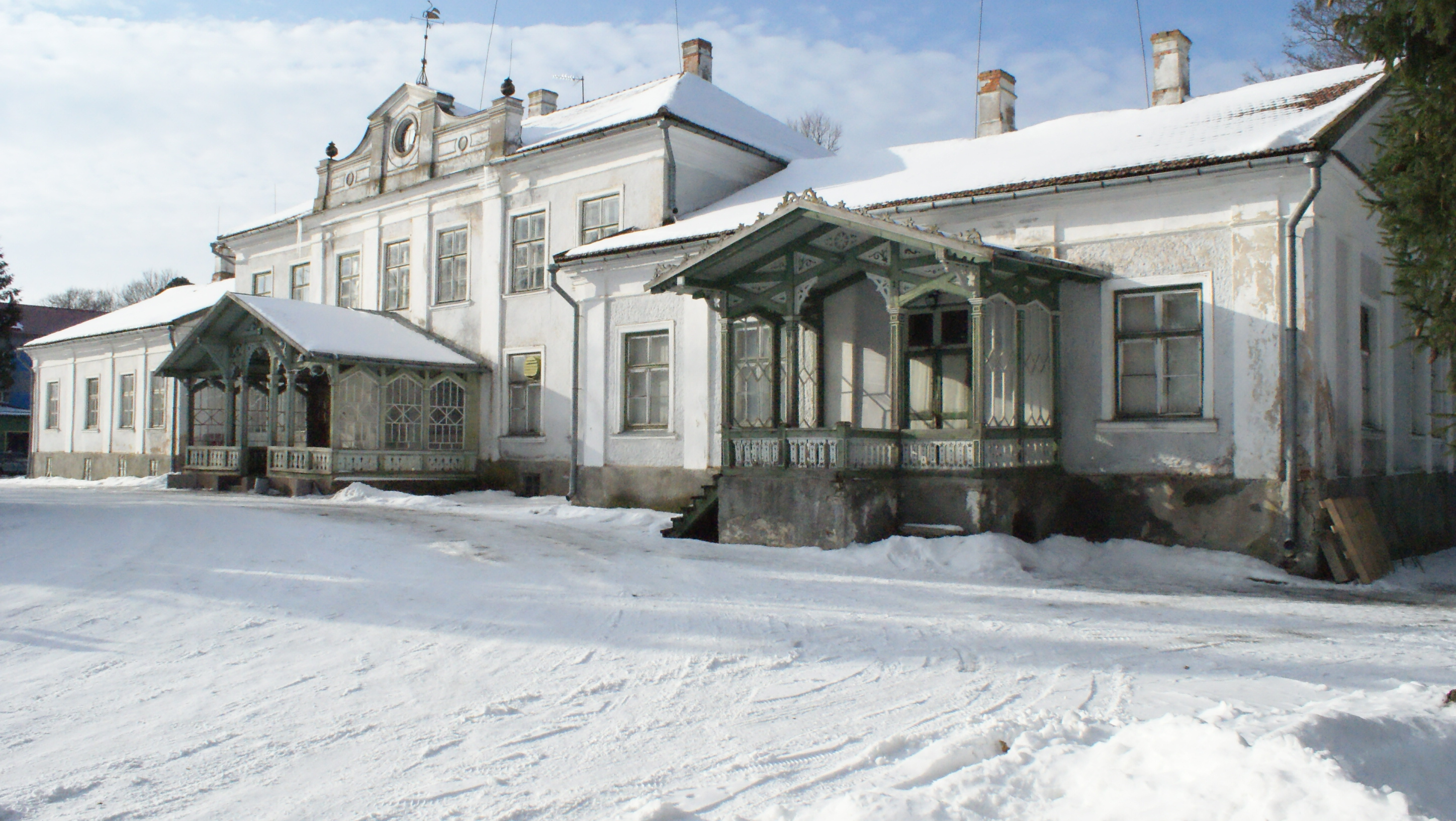
Aa Manor

The Aa manor house (first built 1426–1487) now houses a home for aged people. Other noteworthy sights in Aa include a former garden pavilion (now chapel), the manor park (Aa park, 65,000 m^{2} nature protection area), a pine grove, the Giideon youth camp of the Estonian Methodist Church, and a sand beach.

== See also ==
- Battle of Varja
