= Battle of Varja =

1700 battle in Estonia during Great Northern War

- Part of the Great Northern War
Date	October 27, 1700 (O.S.); October 28, 1700 (Swedish calendar); November 7, 1700 (N.S.)
Location	Varja, Duchy of Estonia, Swedish Empire (present-day Estonia) 59°24′54″N 27°07′39″E
Result	See aftermath

Belligerents
Swedish Empire	Tsardom of Russia

Commanders and leaders
(Swedish Empire) Georg Reinhold von Patkul (POW) (Swedish Empire) Hans Henrik von Tiesenhausen	(Tsardom of Russia) Boris Sheremetev

Units involved
(yes) Tiesenhausen's cavalry regiment	Unknown

Strength
600–800 men	5,000 men

Casualties and losses
280 killed, wounded and captured	1,500 killed, wounded and captured 42 killed and 76 wounded

The Battle of Varja took place on November 7, 1700, near the villages of Varja and Aa, in the Duchy of Estonia, part of the Swedish Empire, during the Estonian campaign of the first year of the Great Northern War.

== Prelude ==
A Swedish force consisting of 600–800 men from Tiesenhausen's Enlisted Estonian Cavalry Regiment under the command of generals Georg Reinhold von Patkul and Hans Henrik von Tiesenhausen were sent out from Rakvere to secure the road at which the main army under Charles XII of Sweden were going in order to relieve the city of Narva, which had been besieged by the Russians for a while.

== Battle ==
At the villages of Varja and Aa they surprised a Russian force of 2,000 men from Boris Sheremetev's detachment gathering supplies for their army at Narva. The Russians were caught completely off guard and subsequently took cover within the houses to avoid the Swedish onslaught, these were however, soon put on fire by the Swedes, an action resulting in 1,500 Russians killed, wounded or captured to about 200 Swedes with only 500 Russians who managed to escape. Later during the day, as the Swedes were looting the Russian supplies, a larger force of 3,000 men under Sheremetev himself, arrived and in turn surprised the Swedes who were driven off with a loss of 80 menand among them, the Swedish commander Georg Reinhold Patkul was captured during the retreat. Other sources claim the Russian's suffered 40 killed and 70 wounded.

== Aftermath ==
The Russians here received important information about the approach of the Swedish main army under Charles, who arrived at the two villages about two weeks later. Sheremetev later faced the Swedish vanguard at Pühhajoggi; however after initial skirmishes he was soon driven off, leading to the Battle of Narva, where the Russian main army saw itself decisively defeated by the Swedish army.

== Works cited ==
- von Essen, Michael Fredholm (24 July 2024). Peter the Great's disastrous defeat at Narva: The Swedish Victory at Narva, 1700. Century of the Soldier 1618–1721. ISBN 9781804514436.
