= Arnold Akberg =

Estonian painter

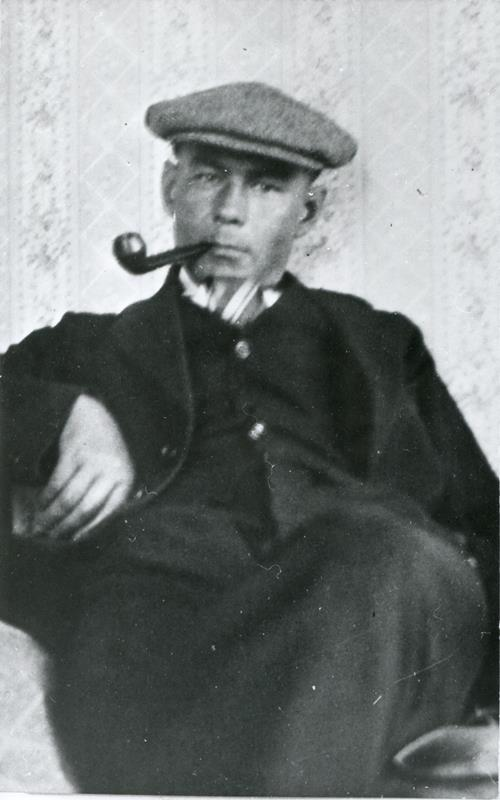

Arnold Akberg (4 February 1894 – 7 October 1984) was an Estonian painter.

== Early life ==
Akberg was born in Võipere, Haljala Parish, Virumaa (now in Kadrina Parish, Lääne-Viru County). He studied at a Teacher's College in Rakvere in 1920, then began teaching in Tallinn. He was mostly a self-taught person, but he had help from Ants Laikmaa, who was also an Estonian painter. He died, aged 90, in Tallinn.

== Style ==
His paintings were described as cubism, with them having a clear composition and delicate colours.

== Exhibitions ==
Akberg held many exhibitions throughout his career, some solo and some with other artists. Among his most successful solo exhibitions were the 1968 Museum of Applied Arts (Estonian Museum of Applied Art and Design), the 1967 exhibition in Tallinn, his exhibition in the Pärnu Museum of Art in 1973. In 1984 he exhibited at the USSR State Art Museum.

Akberg also held group exhibitions with other famous artists. He was a participant at the 1929 exhibition of Estonian art in Helsinki, the Estonian exhibition in Cologne and Copenhagen in 1930, and the 1935 Estonian art exhibition in Moscow, Russia.

== Awards ==
Akberg was the recipient of the 1984 Konrad Hilltop Medal.
