= Kaberla =

Village in Estonia

Coordinates: 59°28′N 25°16′E

- Village
- Interactive map of Kaberla
- Country: Estonia
- County: Harju County
- Parish: Kuusalu Parish
- Time zone: UTC+2 (EET)
  - Summer (DST): UTC+3 (EEST)

Kaberla is a village in Kuusalu Parish, Harju County in northern Estonia.
