= Valkla =

Village in Estonia

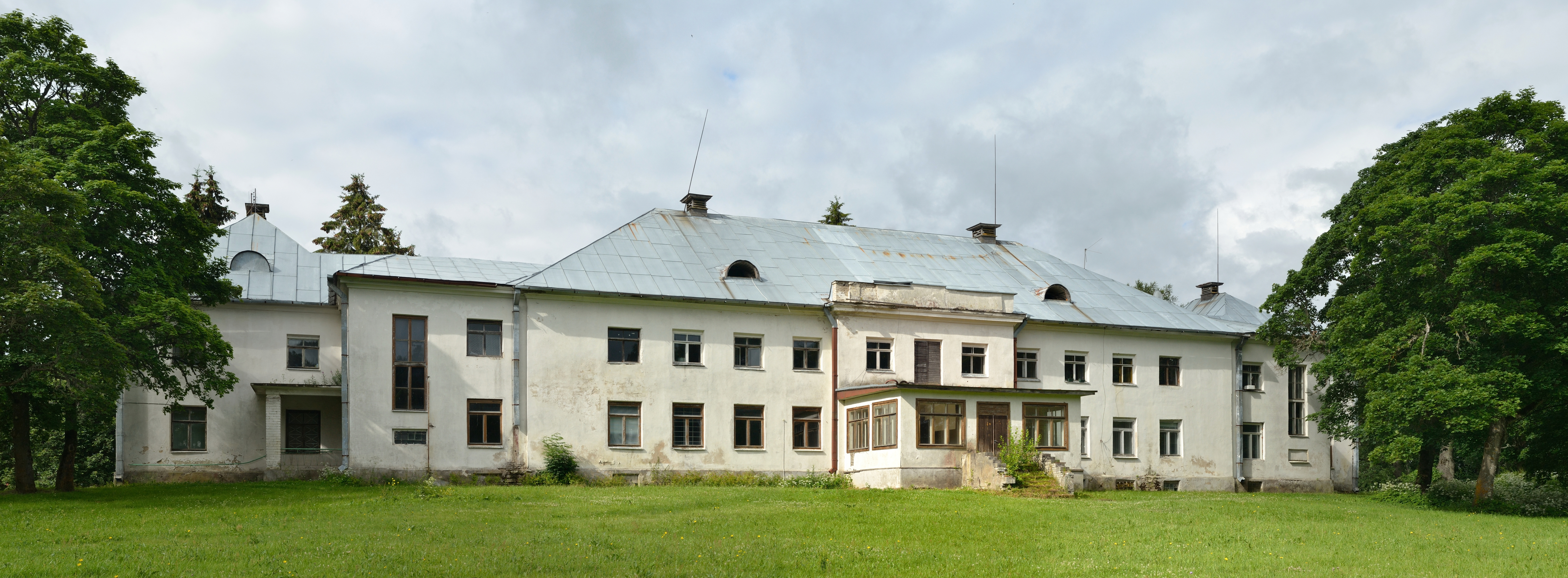
- Valkla Manor

- Location within Estonia
- Coordinates: 59°28′28″N 25°19′7″E
- Country: Estonia
- County: Harju County
- Time zone: UTC+2 (EET)

Valkla is a settlement in Kuusalu Parish, Harju County in northern Estonia.
