= Port of Sillamäe =

Port in Sillamäe, Estonia

AS Sillamäe Sadam
- Type: Private
- Industry: Port authority; maritime transport and logistics
- Founded: December 2, 1997; 28 years ago
- Website: http://www.silport.eu/

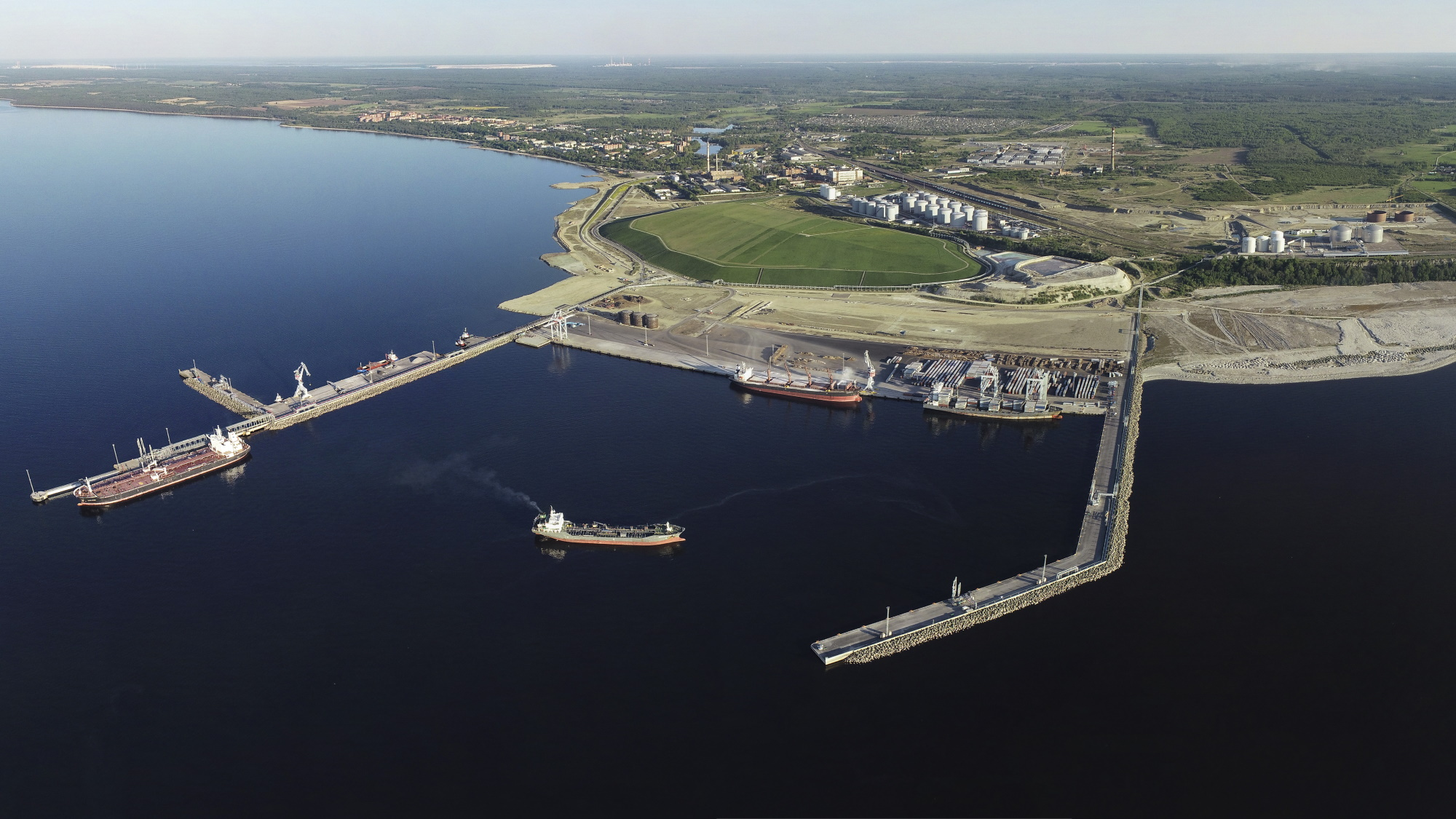
Port of Sillamäe

Port of Sillamäe (port code EE SLM, Estonian: Sillamäe Sadam, Russian: Порт Силламяэ) is the second largest commercial port in Estonia.

== Overview ==
Port of Sillamäe is a universal port capable of handling all types of cargo, including liquid, bulk, general cargo, container, ro-ro and project cargo, as well as serve the passengers.

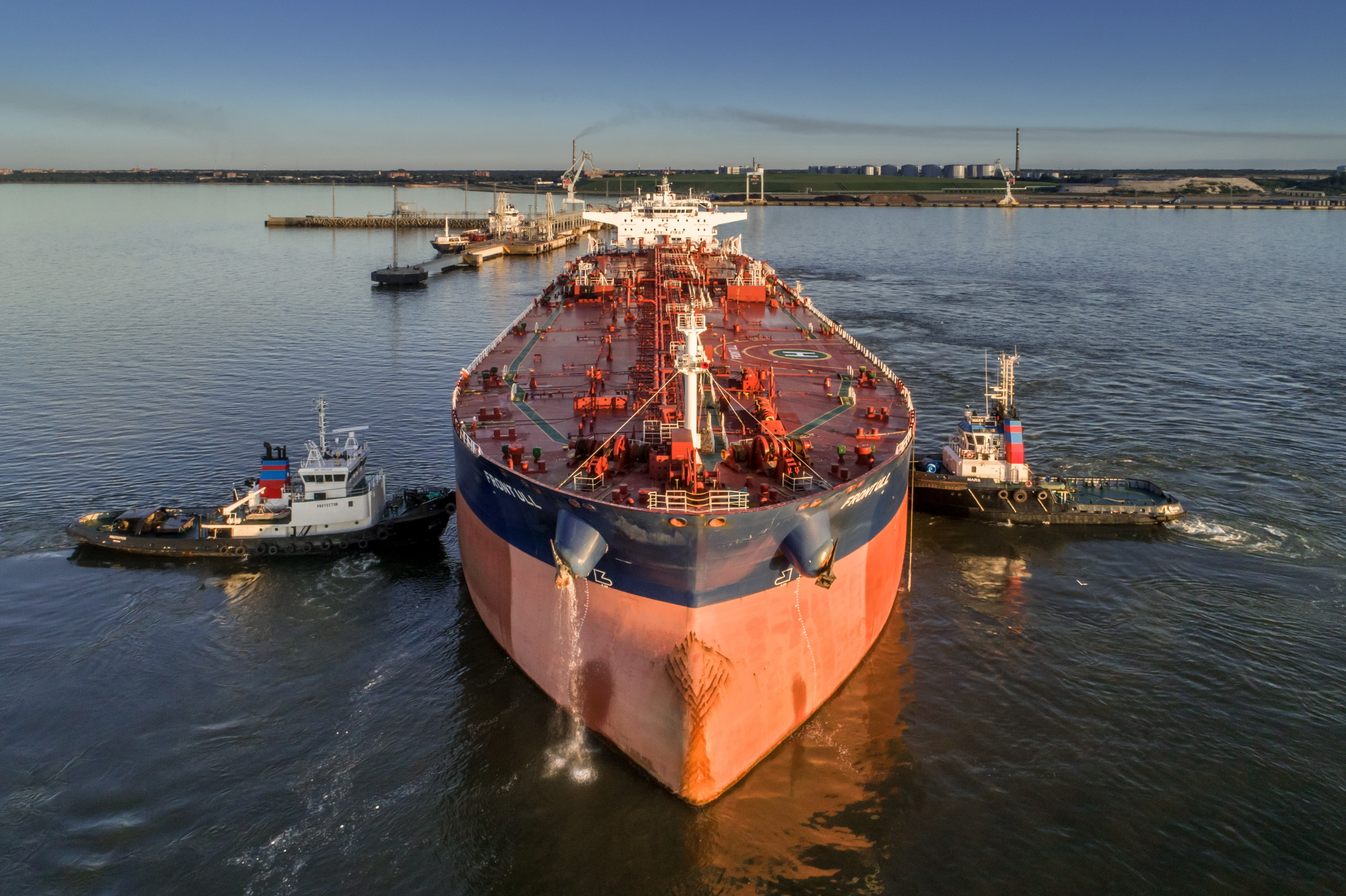
A tanker mooring at the Port of Sillamäe.

The port is located on the shores of Narva Bay at coordinates 59.421010°N 27.739211°E. The depth in the port reaches from 13 meters (BK77) to 16.5 meters (BK77). This allows the port to receive and service all vessels that are able to pass through the Danish Straits.

The sea channel is a semi-restricted (dredged in shallow water) single-line channel classified as Group A Channel – supplied with day and night navigational aids as well as providing guaranteed depths of 16,5 m (BK77).

Ice conditions in the port are favorable for all-year-round navigation and no ice breaking is needed in an average winter.

== Operations ==
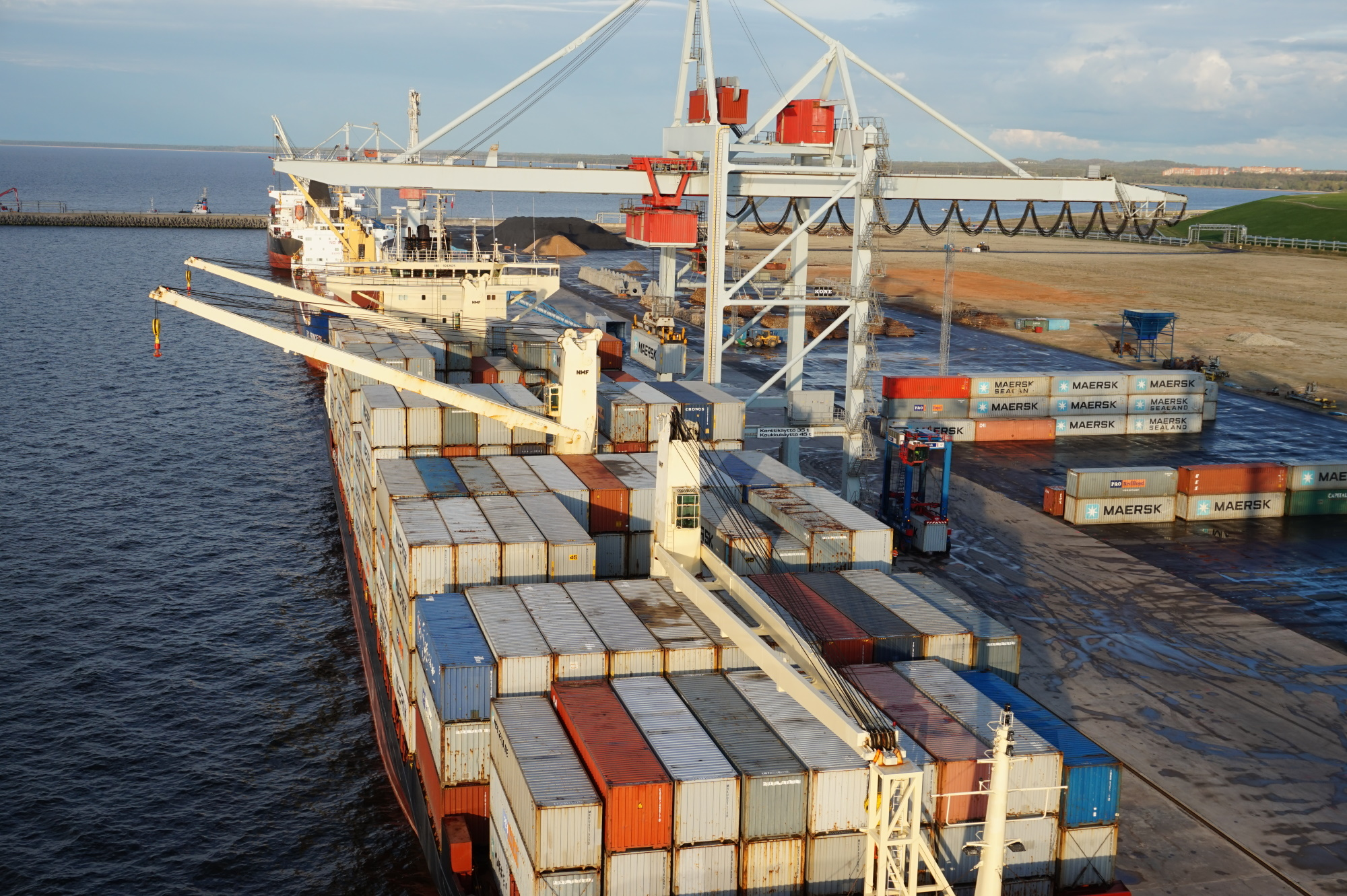
Loading of containers.

The port opened for navigation in 2005, has 15 berths with a total length of 3 km, as well as its own railway station with a total length of railroads more than 30 km. Tracks gauge is 1520 mm.

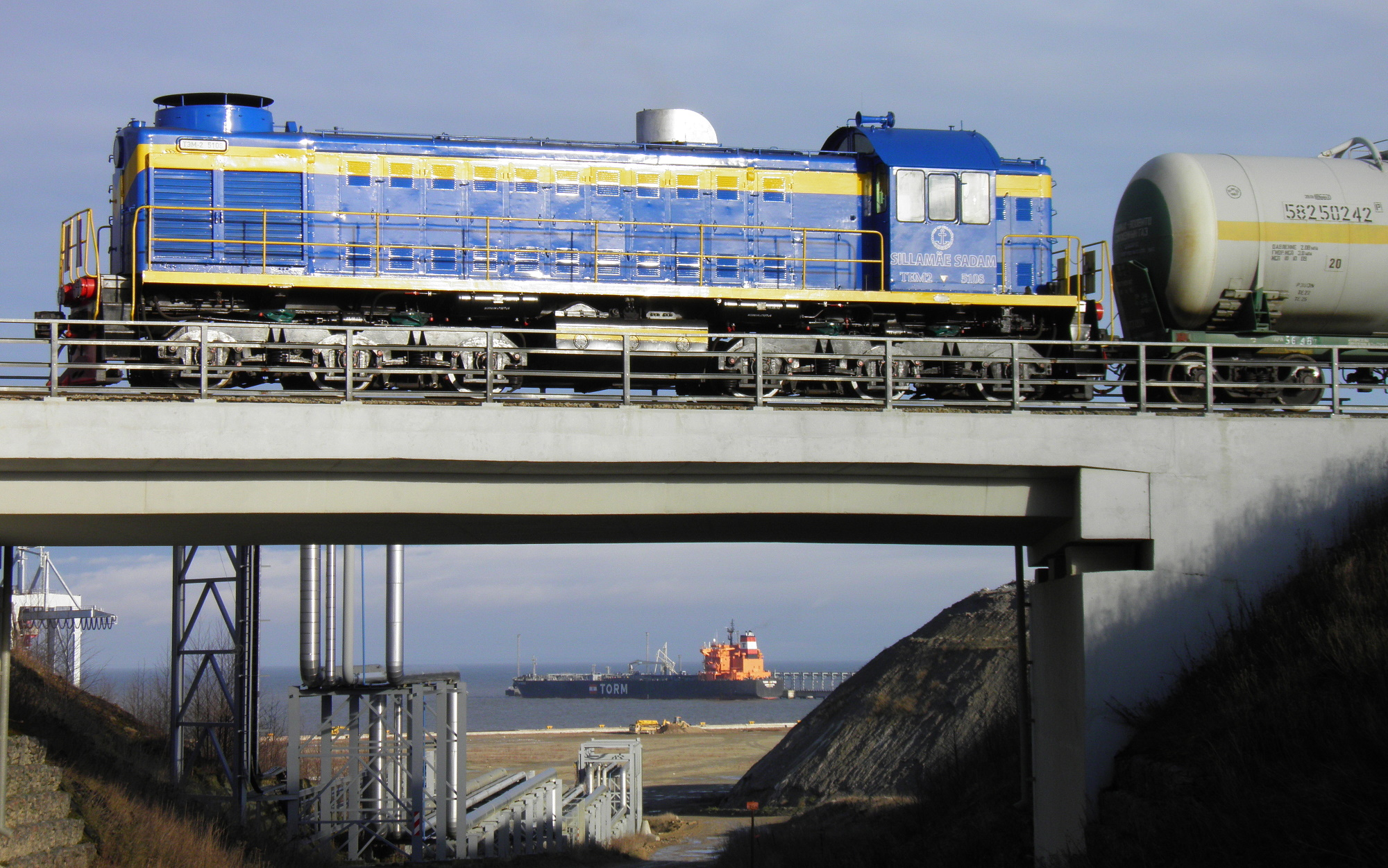
The port road network also includes two-level intersections.

There are four terminals in the port:

- Alexela Sillamäe - dark oil products and shale oil;
- DBT - liquid mineral fertilizers;
- Silsteve - containers, general, bulk and project cargoes, ro-ro cargoes;
- EuroChem Terminal Sillamäe - liquid chemical products.

The port is powered by Silpower's own heat and power station.

The landlord type of port with 750-hectares has created in the Sillamäe Free Zone Area an Industrial Park with 69 different enterprises, which together form a cluster of the port of Sillamäe.

The port has an international ISPS security certificate.

The port's cargo turnover is about 10 million tons (2019).

== See also ==
- Ports of the Baltic Sea
