= Purtse (river) =

River in Estonia

Purtse River
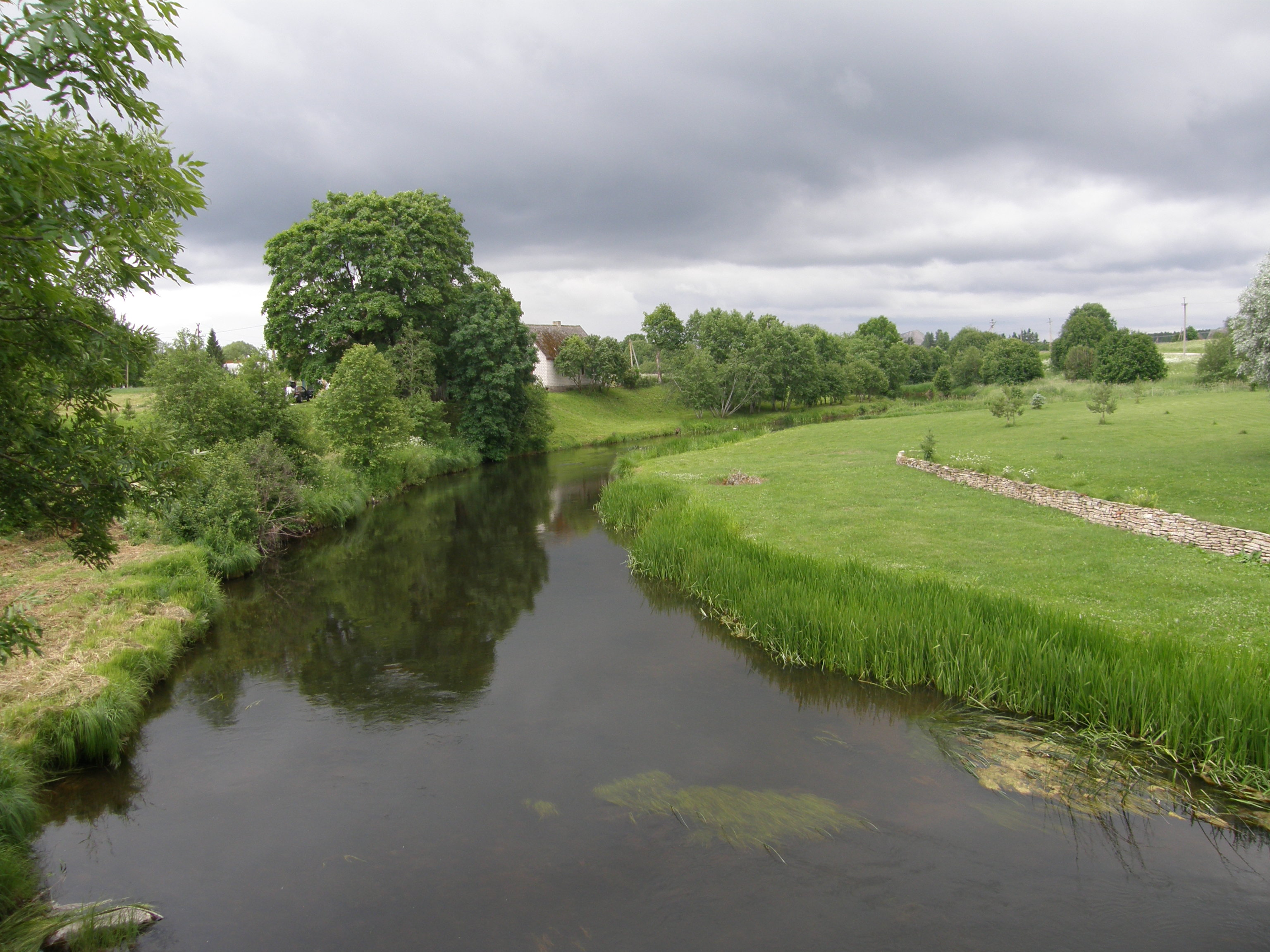
- The Purtse River in Lüganuse (June 2011)

Location
- Country: Estonia

Physical characteristics
- Mouth: Gulf of Finland
  - location: Liimala
  - coordinates: 59°26′08″N 26°59′32″E
- Length: 51.2 km (31.8 mi)
- Basin size: 811 km^{2} (313 sq mi)

The Purtse River is a river in Estonia in the Ida-Viru and Lääne-Viru counties. The river is 51.2 km long, and its basin size is 811 km^{2}. It discharges into the Gulf of Finland.

== See also ==
- List of rivers of Estonia
