= Viru Square =

Square in Tallinn, Estonia

Coordinates: 59°26′13.39″N 24°45′13.59″E

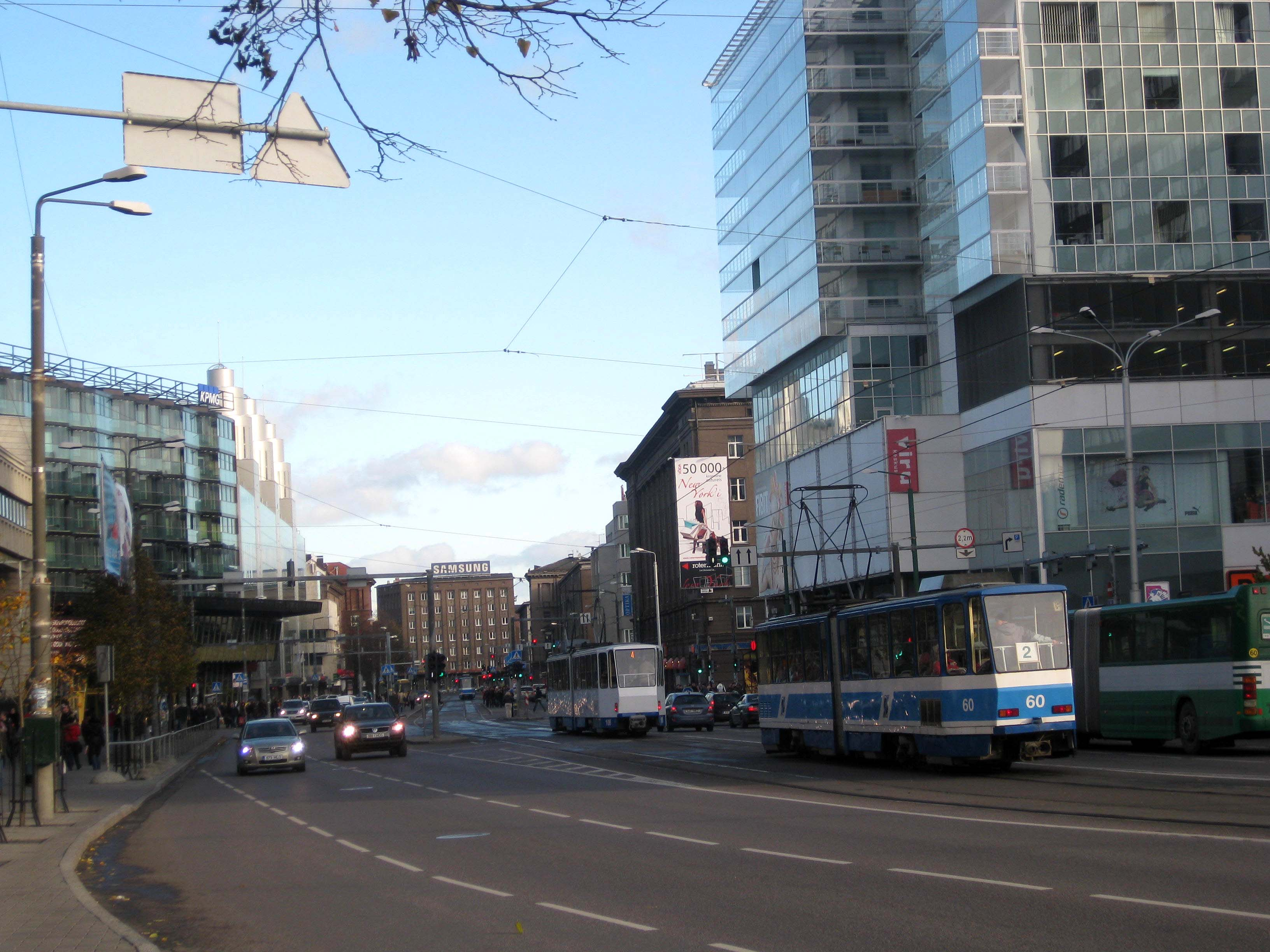
The beginning of Narva maantee, (Viru Centre in the right).

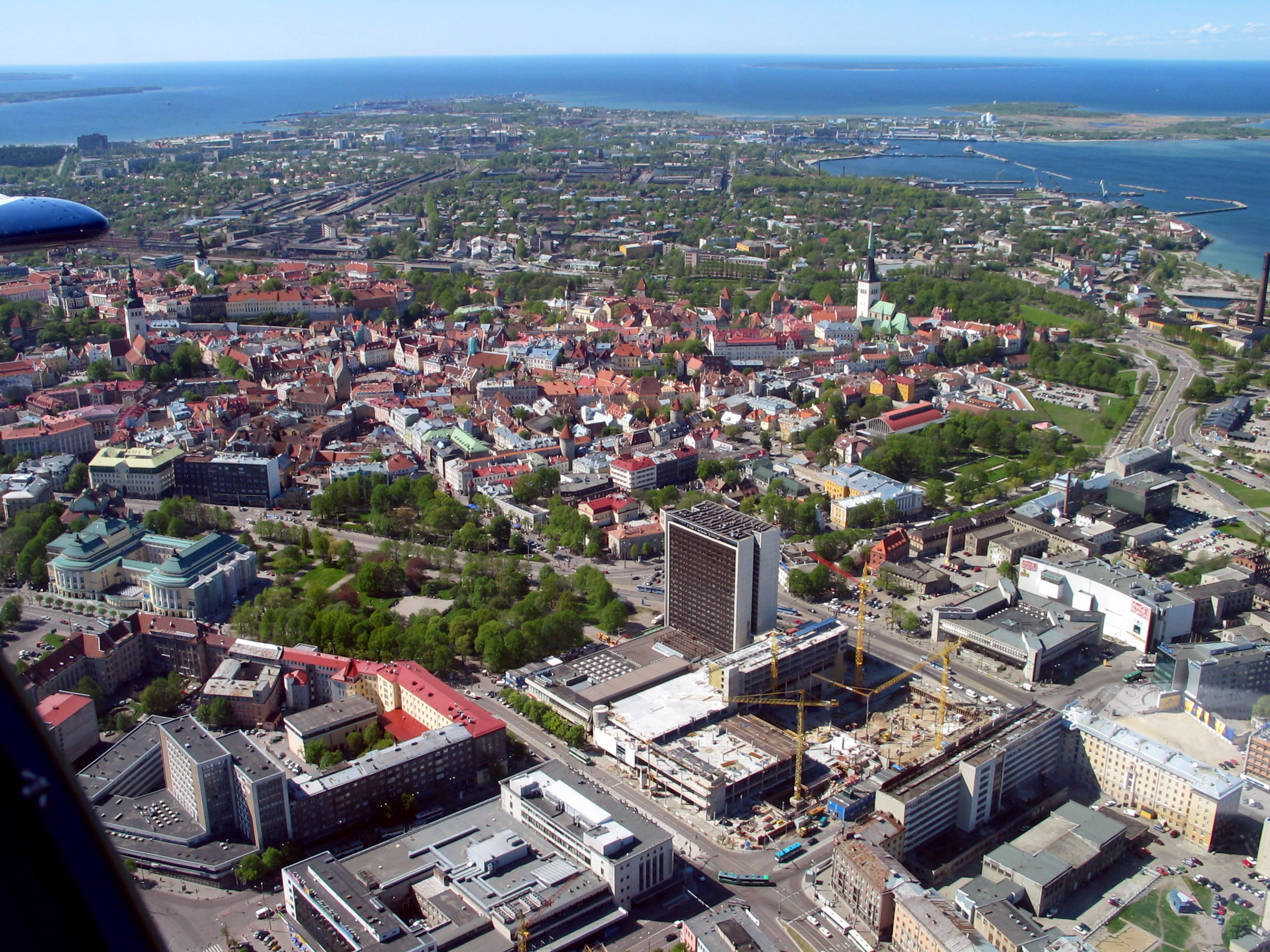
The building process of Viru Centre in 2003.

Viru Square (Estonian: Viru väljak) was a square in the center of Tallinn, Estonia. It existed as a square until 2002 when the construction of Viru Centre began. Currently only a roundabout and an official "street name" are left of the former open area. The roundabout is the intersection of three main streets of Tallinn: Pärnu maantee (Pärnu Road), Narva maantee (Narva Road), Mere puiestee (Sea Avenue); and two smaller: Viru tänav and Vana-Viru tänav (Old-Viru Street). Also, all of the five tram lines of Tallinn(except 2, which goes via the harbour)go through the roundabout.

== Names over time ==
- Until 1939: Russian market (Estonian: Vene turg; Russian: Русскій рынокъ, Вшивый рынок; German: Russischer Markt, Läusemarkt). Also known as lice market (Estonian: täiturg)
- 1939–1940: Viru Square
- 1940–1960: Stalin Square (during the German occupation [1941–1944] Wierländischer Platz).
- 1960–1970: Centre Square (Estonian: Keskväljak)
- 1970–present: renamed Viru Square

== Buildings around Viru Square ==
- Viru hotel (1972), Viru Square 4
- Café Amigo
- Viru Centre, Viru väljak 4/6
- Viru Centre Bus Terminal, Viru väljak 6
- Fire Station, Vana-Viru Street 14
- Tammsaare Park - named after Estonian writer A. H. Tammsaare
