= Sigula =

Village in Estonia

Coordinates: 59°26′N 25°36′E

- Village
- Interactive map of Sigula
- Country: Estonia
- County: Harju County
- Parish: Kuusalu Parish
- Time zone: UTC+2 (EET)
  - Summer (DST): UTC+3 (EEST)

Sigula is a village in Kuusalu Parish, Harju County in northern Estonia.
