= Võipere =

Village in Estonia

- Village
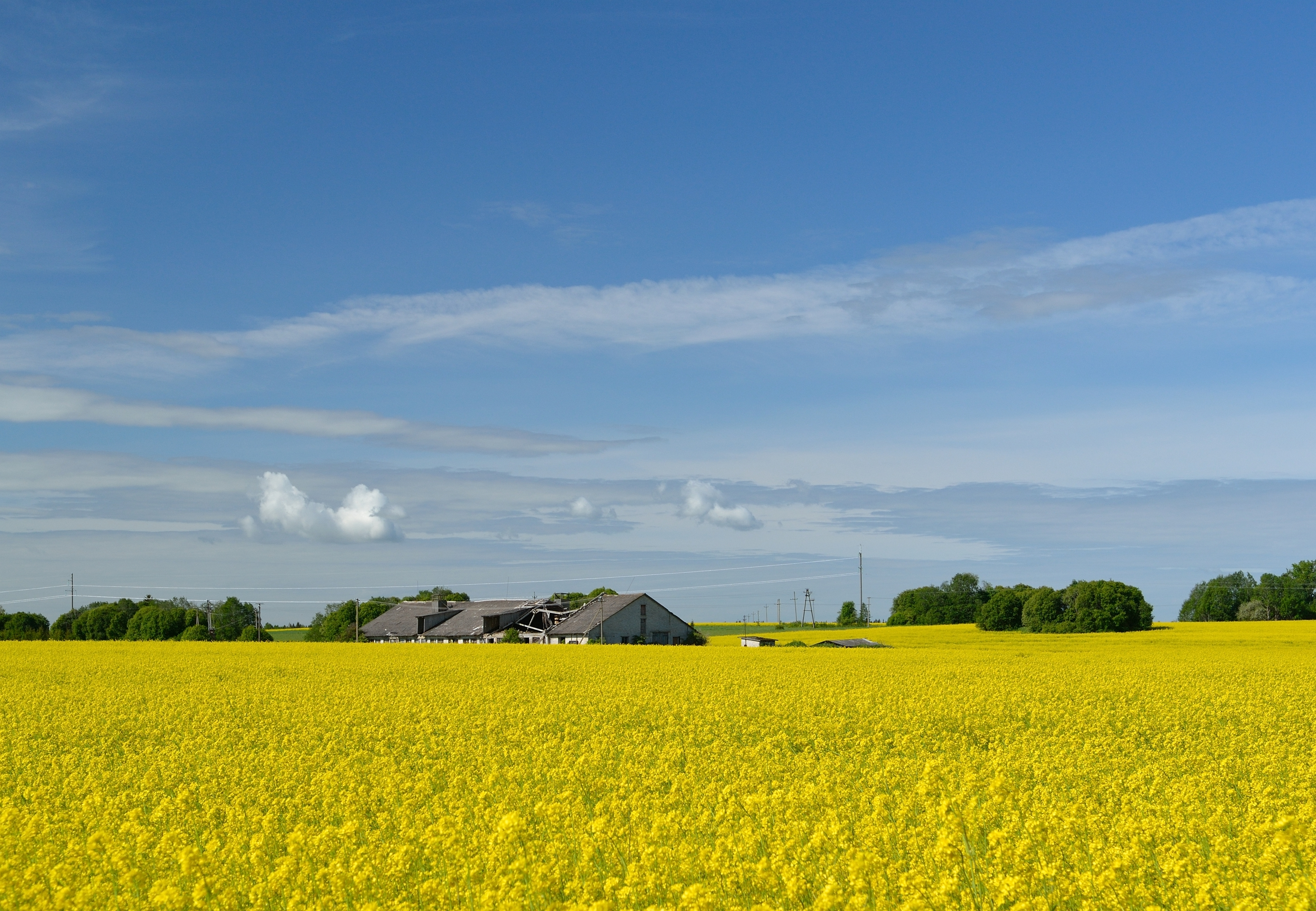

- Location within Estonia
- Coordinates: 59°25′N 26°07′E
- Country: Estonia
- County: Lääne-Viru County
- Parish: Kadrina Parish

Population (2007)
  - Total: 56
- Time zone: UTC+2 (EET)
  - Summer (DST): UTC+3 (EEST)

Võipere is a village in Kadrina Parish, Lääne-Viru County, in northeastern Estonia.

Painter Arnold Akberg (1894–1984) is born in this village.
