= Hirvli =

Village in Estonia

Coordinates: 59°26′N 25°32′E

- Village
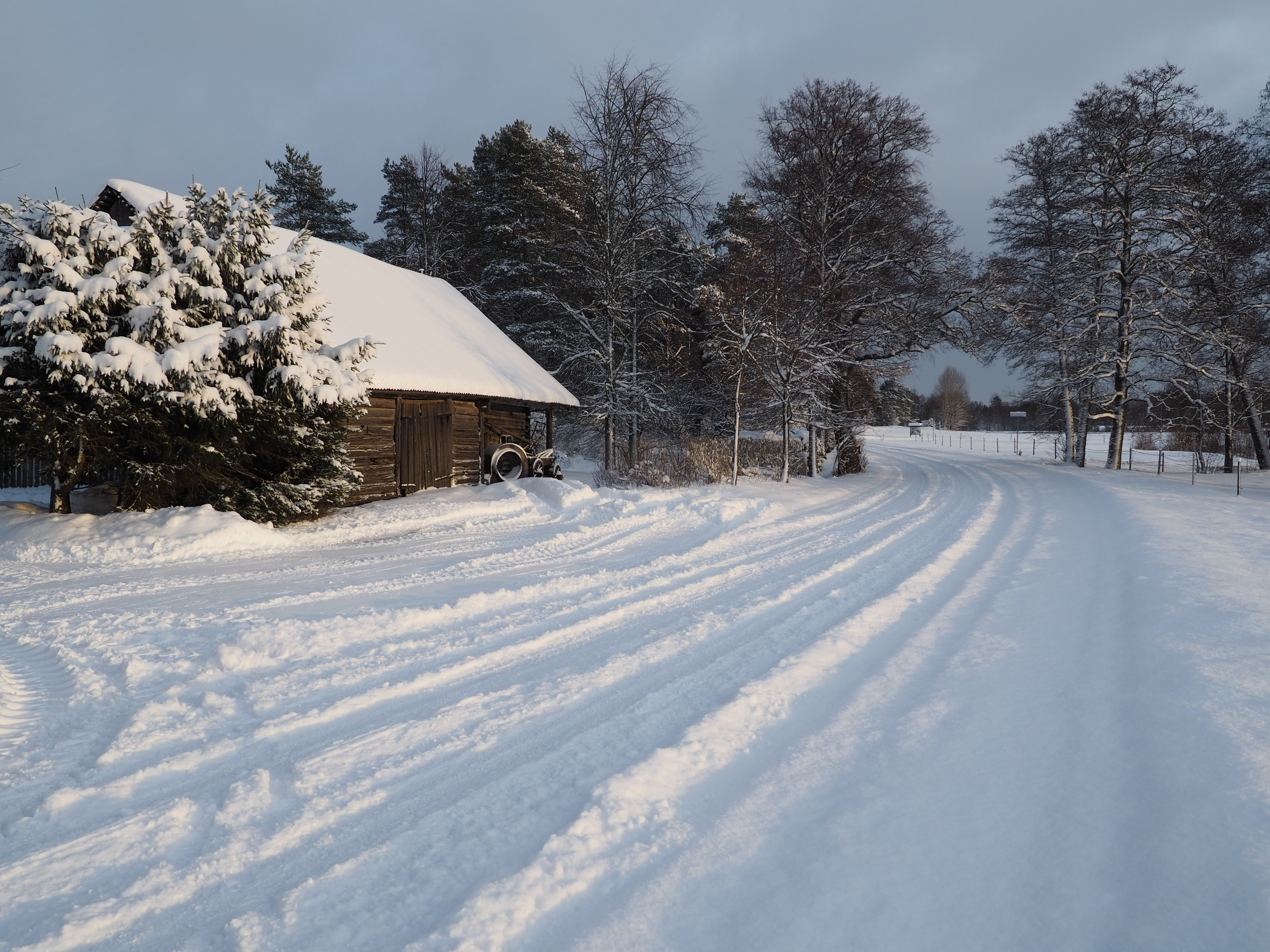
- Interactive map of Hirvli
- Country: Estonia
- County: Harju County
- Parish: Kuusalu Parish
- Time zone: UTC+2 (EET)
  - Summer (DST): UTC+3 (EEST)

Hirvli is a village in Kuusalu Parish, Harju County in northern Estonia.
