= Loobu =

Village in Estonia

Coordinates: 59°27′N 25°55′E

- Village
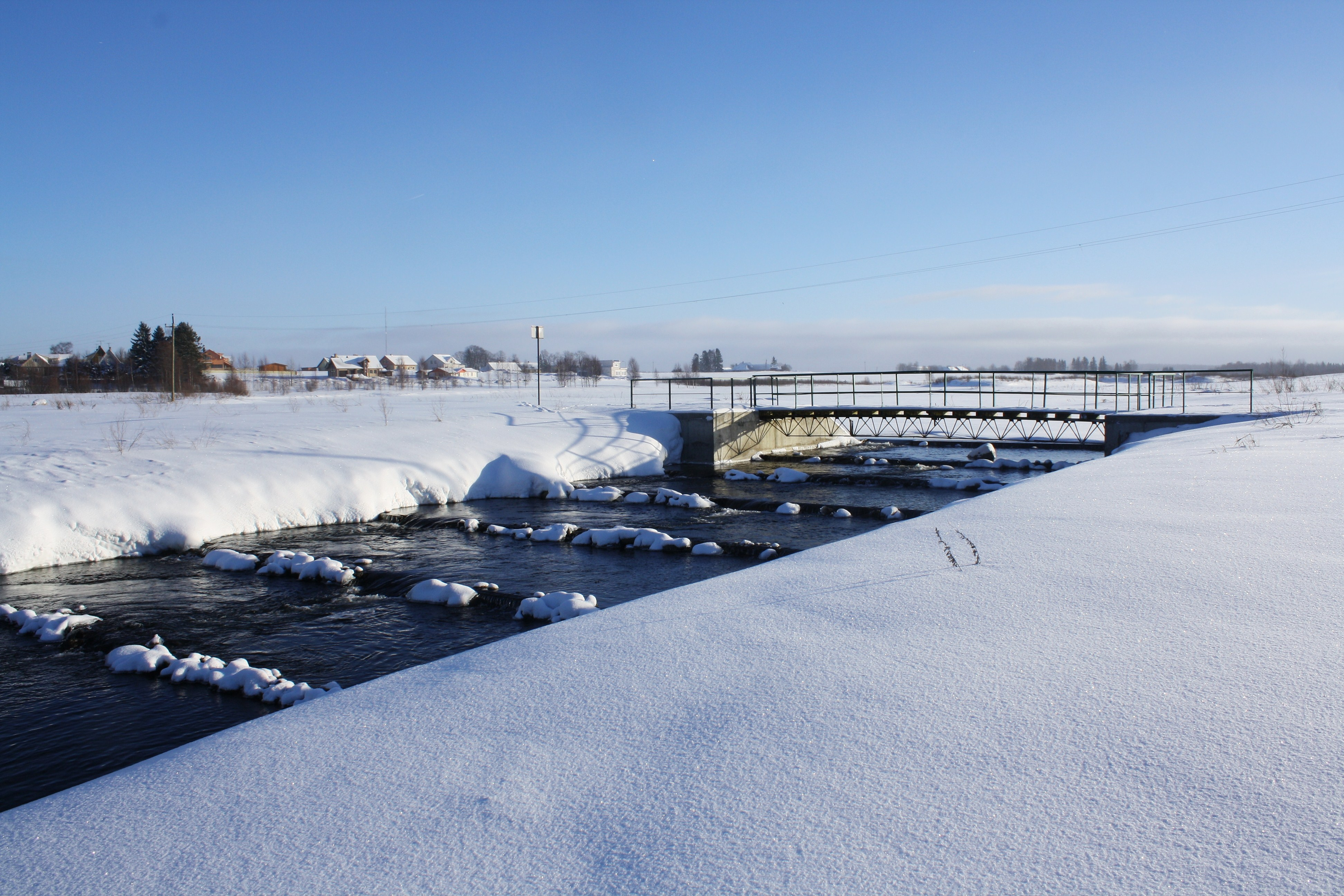
- Fish ladder beside the dam on Loobu River in Loobu
- Interactive map of Loobu
- Country: Estonia
- County: Lääne-Viru County
- Parish: Kadrina Parish
- Time zone: UTC+2 (EET)
  - Summer (DST): UTC+3 (EEST)

Loobu is a village in Kadrina Parish, Lääne-Viru County, in northeastern Estonia. It lies on the Loobu River.
