= Lüganuse =

Borough in Estonia

- Small borough
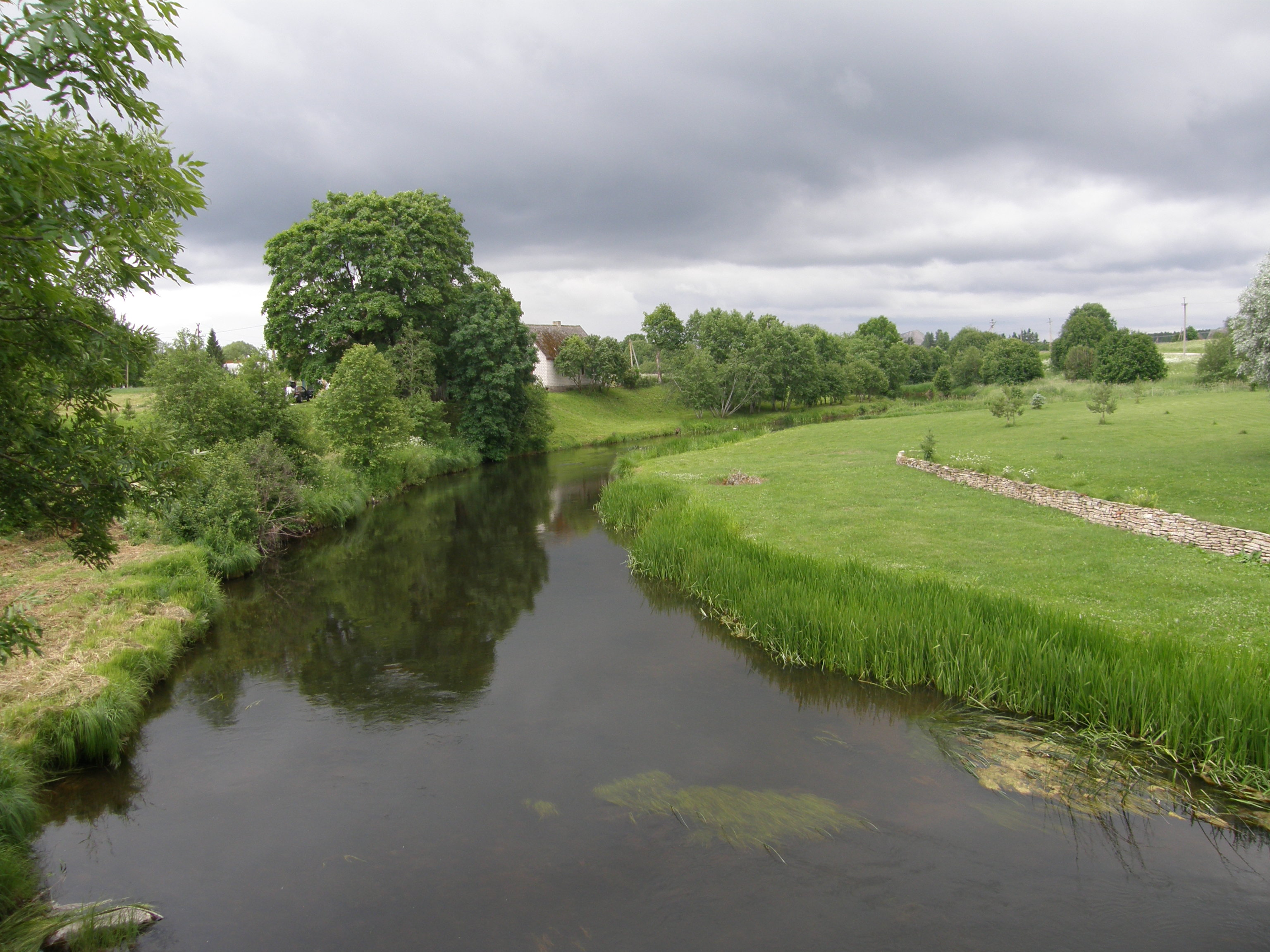
- Purtse River in Lüganuse

- Location in Estonia
- Coordinates: 59°22′50″N 27°01′49″E
- Country: Estonia
- County: Ida-Viru County
- Municipality: Lüganuse Parish

Population (2011 Census)
  - Total: 439

Lüganuse (German: Luggenhusen) is a small borough (alevik) in Ida-Viru County, northern Estonia. It is the administrative centre of Lüganuse Parish. As of the 2011 census, the settlement's population was 439, of which the Estonians were 423 (96.4%).

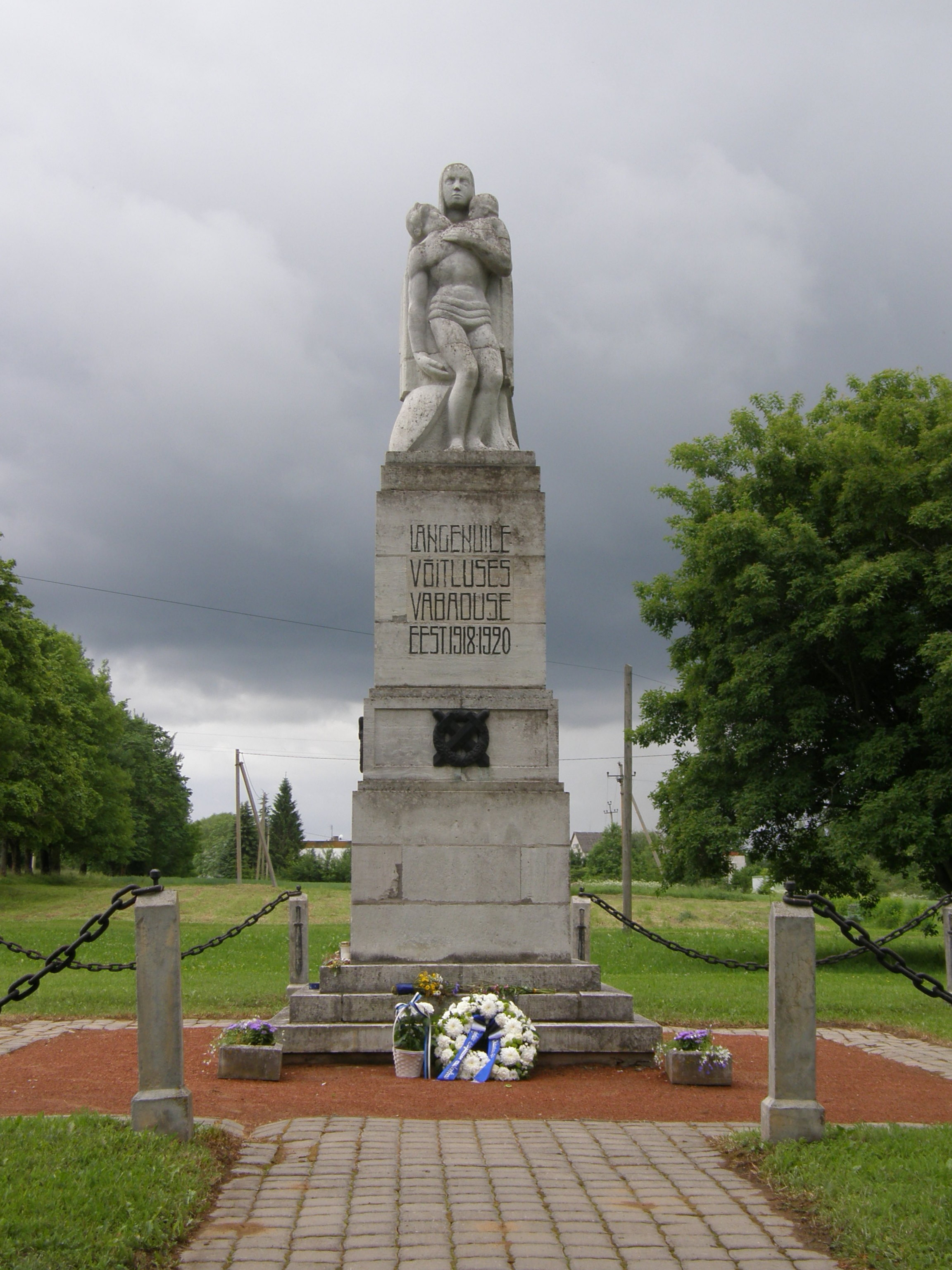
Estonian War of Independence memorial in Lüganuse created by Voldemar Mellik
